= List of companies of the United Arab Emirates =

Location of the United Arab Emirates

The United Arab Emirates is a country at the southeast end of the Arabian Peninsula on the Persian Gulf.

The economy is the second largest in the Arab world (after Saudi Arabia), with a gross domestic product (GDP) of US$570 billion (DH 2.1 trillion) in 2014. Though, the United Arab Emirates has been successfully diversifying its economy, the country remains extremely reliant on oil. With the exception of Dubai, most of the UAE is dependent on oil revenues. Petroleum and natural gas continue to play a central role in the economy, especially in Abu Dhabi. More than 85% of the UAE's economy was based on oil exports in 2009. While Abu Dhabi and other UAE emirates have remained relatively conservative in their approach to diversification, Dubai, which has far smaller oil reserves, was bolder in its diversification policy. In 2011, oil exports accounted for 77% of the UAE's state budget.

== Notable firms ==
This list includes notable companies with primary headquarters located in the country. The industry and sector follow the Industry Classification Benchmark taxonomy. Organizations that have ceased operations are included and noted as defunct.

Notable companies Status: P=Private, S=State; A=Active, D=Defunct
| Name | Industry | Sector | Headquarters | Founded | Notes | Status | |
|---|---|---|---|---|---|---|---|
| Aabar Investments | Financials | Real estate holding & development | Abu Dhabi | 2005 | Real estate and project investments, ADX: AABAR | S | A |
| Abu Dhabi Aviation | Consumer services | Airlines | Abu Dhabi | 1975 | Airline, ADX: ADAVIATION | P | A |
| Abu Dhabi Commercial Bank | Financials | Banks | Abu Dhabi | 1985 | ADX: ADCB | S | A |
| Abu Dhabi Islamic Bank | Financials | Banks | Abu Dhabi | 1997 | ADX: ADIB | P | A |
| Abu Dhabi Media | Consumer services | Publishing | Abu Dhabi | 2007 | Publishing and broadcasting | S | A |
| Abu Dhabi National Energy Company (TAQA) | Oil & gas | Exploration & production | Abu Dhabi | 2005 | State-owned, ADX: TAQA | S | A |
| Abu Dhabi National Hotels | Consumer services | Hotels | Abu Dhabi | 1976 | ADX: ADNH | S | A |
| Abu Dhabi National Insurance Company | Financials | Full line insurance | Abu Dhabi | 1972 | Insurance | P | A |
| Abu Dhabi National Oil Company (ADNOC) | Oil & gas | Exploration & production | Abu Dhabi | 1971 | State-owned | S | A |
| Abu Dhabi Ports | Industrials | Transportation services | Abu Dhabi | 2006 | Ports | P | A |
| Air Arabia | Consumer services | Airlines | Sharjah | 2003 | Airline, DFM: AIRARABIA | P | A |
| Ajman Bank | Financials | Banks | Ajman | 2007 | DFM: AJMANBANK | P | A |
| Al Dahra Agricultural Company | Consumer goods | Farming & fishing | Abu Dhabi | 1995 | Animal feed, farming, food products | P | A |
| Al Ghurair Group | Conglomerates | - | Dubai | 1960 | Industrials, real estate, investments | P | A |
| Al Tayer Group | Conglomerates | - | Dubai | 1979 | Automotive, retail, industrials | P | A |
| Aldar Properties | Financials | Real estate holding & development | Abu Dhabi | 2001 | ADX: ALDAR | P | A |
| Aqaar | Financials | Real estate holding & development | Ajman | 2016 | State-owned | S | A |
| Arab Center for Consultancy & Economic Studies | Financials | Consultancy and feasibility studies | Abu Dhabi | 2006 | Economic feasibility studies | P | A |
| Aramex | Industrials | Delivery services | Dubai | 1982 | DFM: ARMX | P | A |
| Armada Group | Conglomerates | - | Dubai | 1974 | Investment, engineering, construction, real estate | P | A |
| Dana Gas | Oil & gas | Exploration & production | Sharjah | 2005 | ADX: DANA | P | A |
| Dar Al Khaleej Printing and Publishing | Consumer services | Publishing | Sharjah | 1970 | Newspaper, magazines | P | A |
| DP World | Industrials | Transportation services | Dubai | 2005 | Maritime, ports | S | A |
| du | Telecommunications | Mobile telecommunications | Dubai | 2005 | Emirates integrated telecommunications company, DFM: DU | S | A |
| Dubai Bank | Financials | Banks | Dubai | 2002 | Islamic bank, merged into Emirates NBD | P | D |
| Dubai Financial Market | Financials | Investment services | Dubai | 2000 | Stock exchange, DFM: DFM | S | A |
| Dubai Holding | Conglomerates | - | Dubai | 2004 | Hospitality, financial services, real estate, healthcare, media | P | A |
| Dubai Islamic Bank | Financials | Banks | Dubai | 1975 | Islamic bank, DFM: DIB | P | A |
| Dubai Media Incorporated | Consumer services | Broadcasting & entertainment | Dubai | 2003 | State-owned | S | A |
| Edutech | Industrials | Support services | Dubai | 1991 | Education and technology | P | A |
| Emaar Properties | Financials | Real estate holding & development | Dubai | 1997 | DFM: EMAAR | P | A |
| Emirates | Consumer services | Airlines | Dubai | 1985 | Airline, part of The Emirates Group | S | A |
| Emirates Global Aluminium | Industrials | Aluminium | Abu Dhabi | 1979 | Aluminium conglomerate | P | A |
| The Emirates Group | Consumer services | Airlines | Dubai | 1985 | Airline holding | S | A |
| Emirates Trading Agency | Financials | Real estate holding & development | Dubai | 1973 | Holding and investments | P | A |
| Etihad Airways | Consumer services | Airlines | Abu Dhabi | 2003 | Airline | S | A |
| Etihad Rail | | Railroad | Abu Dhabi | 2009 | | P | A |
| Etisalat | Telecommunications | Fixed line telecommunications | Abu Dhabi | 1976 | Telecom, ISP | P | A |
| First Gulf Bank | Financials | Banks | Abu Dhabi | 1979 | ADX: FGB | P | A |
| International Holding Company | Conglomerates | Investments | Abu Dhabi | 1998 | Investment holding | P | A |
| Julphar | Health care | Pharmaceuticals | Ras Al Khaimah | 1980 | ADX: JULPHAR | P | A |
| Jumeirah Group | Consumer services | Hotels | Dubai | 1997 | Hotels | P | A |
| LuLu Group International | Conglomerates | - | Abu Dhabi | 2000 | Retail | P | A |
| KOI Technologies | Transportation | Transportation services | Dubai | 2015 | B2B ground transportation platform, airport transfers, limousine services | P | A |
| Mara Group | Conglomerates | - | Dubai | 1996 | Financial services, real estate, infrastructure, technology | P | A |
| Mashreqbank | Financials | Banks | Dubai | 1967 | Private bank, DFM: MASQ | P | A |
| Musafir | Travel | Travelling | Sharjah | 2007 | Travel Agency | P | A |
| National Bank of Abu Dhabi | Financials | Banks | Abu Dhabi | 1968 | ADX: NBAD | S | A |
| National Bank of Dubai | Financials | Banks | Dubai | 2007 | DFM: ENDB | P | A |
| NewBoy | Consumer goods | Toys | Dubai | 1999 | Dolls | P | A |
| Noor Islamic Bank | Financials | Banks | Dubai | 2008 | Islamic bank | P | A |
| Opontia | Consumer goods | E-commerce | Dubai | 2021 | E-commerce | P | A |
| RAKBANK | Financials | Banks | Ras Al Khaimah | 1970 | ADX: RAKBANK | S | A |
| Sharjah Islamic Bank | Financials | Banks | Sharjah | 1976 | Islamic bank, ADX: SIB | P | A |
| SHUAA Capital | Financials | Asset managers | Dubai | 1979 | DFM: SHUAA | P | A |
| Shipa Delivery | Logistics | Last-mile delivery service | Dubai | 2016 | | P | A |
| Sorouh Real Estate | Financials | Real estate holding & development | Abu Dhabi | 2003 | ADX: SOROUH | P | A |
| Souq.com | Consumer services | Broadline retailers | Dubai | 2005 | | P | A |
| Spacetoon | Consumer services | Broadcasting & entertainment | Dubai | 2000 | Animation and children's television | P | A |
| Spinneys | Consumer services | Food retailers & wholesalers | Dubai | 1924 | Grocery | P | A |
| Tamweel | Financials | Real estate holding & development | Abu Dhabi | 2000 | DFM: TAMWEEL | P | A |
| Techlink | Consumer services | Retail | Dubai | 2000 | Electronics and appliance stores | P | A |
| Thuraya | Telecommunications | Mobile telecommunications | Abu Dhabi | 1997 | Satellite communications | P | A |
| Unibeton Ready Mix | Industrials | Building materials & fixtures | Abu Dhabi | 1980 | Concrete | P | A |
| Union National Bank | Financials | Banks | Abu Dhabi | 1982 | ADX: UNB | P | A |
| Ureed | Service marketplace | Freelance | Dubai | 2017 | Privately held | P | A |

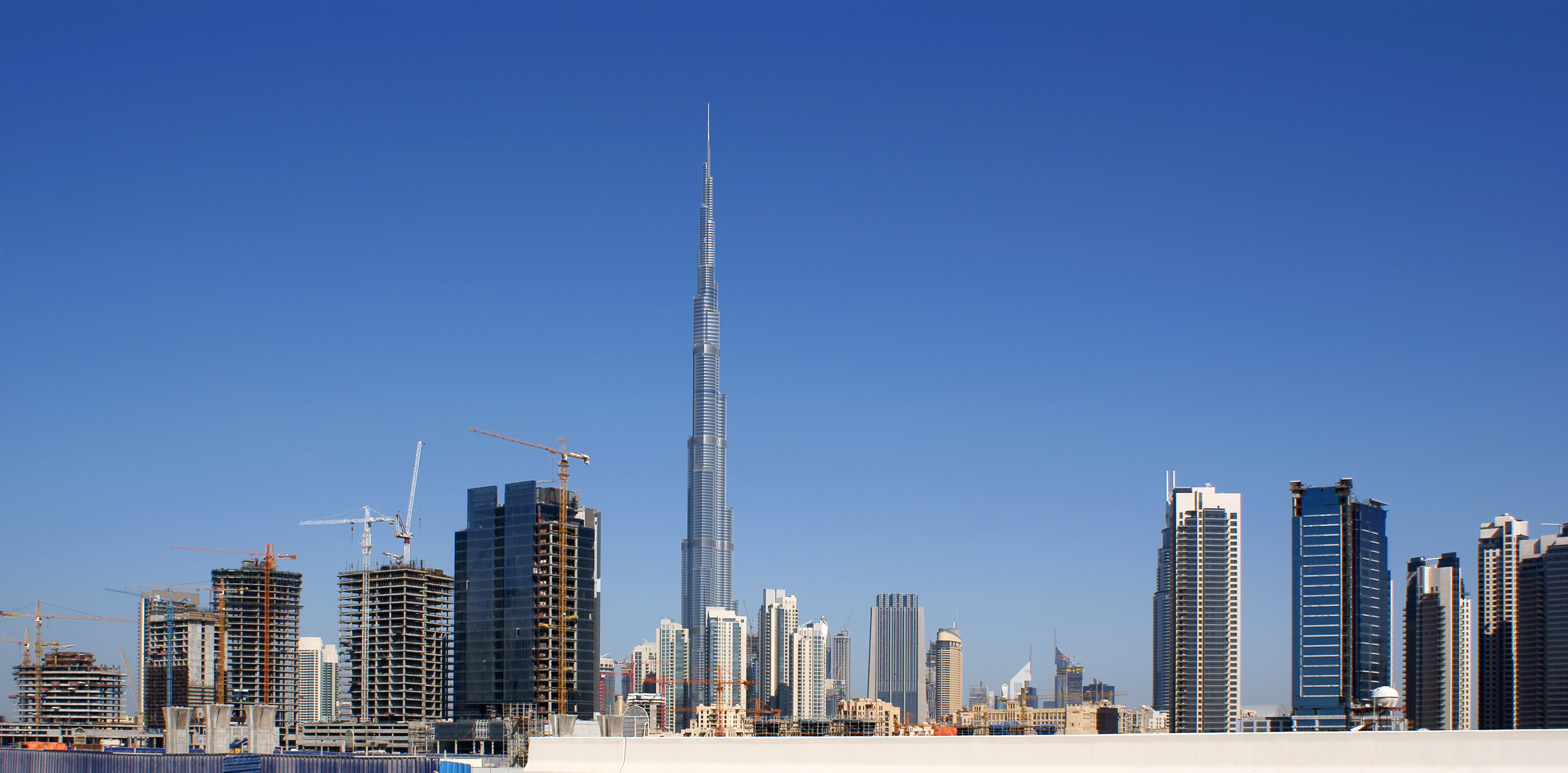
Dubai skyline and world's tallest building, Burj Khalifa

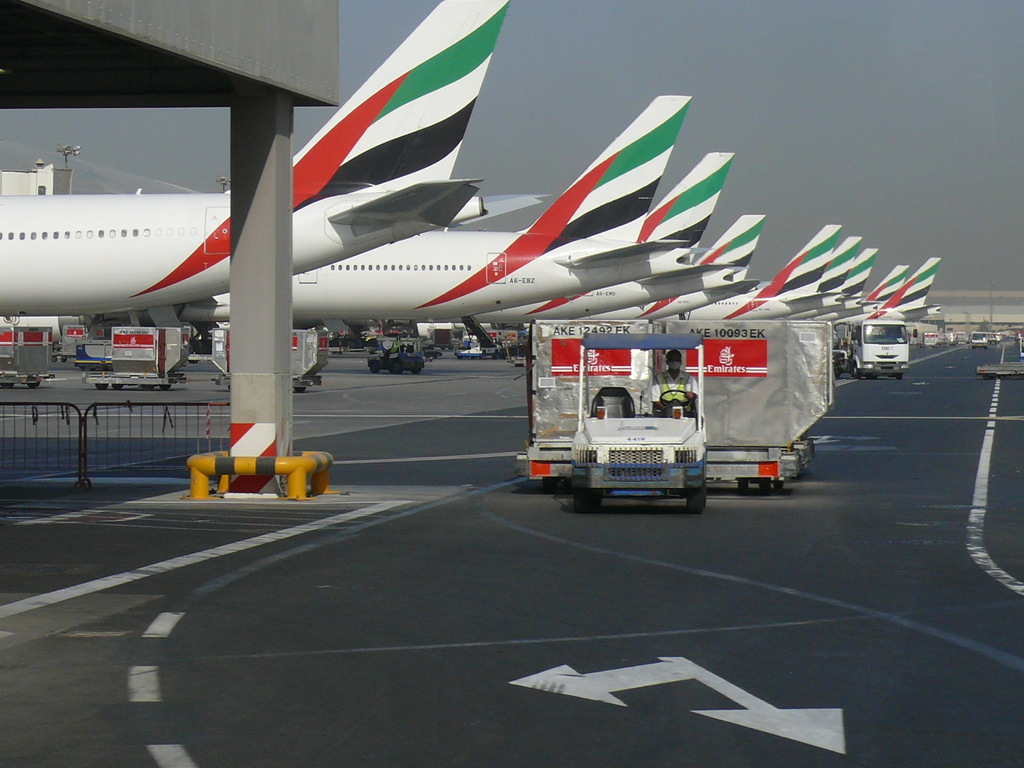
Airplanes from Emirates at Dubai International Airport

== See also ==
- Economy of the United Arab Emirates
- List of largest companies of the United Arab Emirates
