= List of banks in the United Arab Emirates =

This is a list of banks in the United Arab Emirates.

== List of National Banks ==
Bank Name	Bank name (in Arabic)	Headquarters	Stock code
Abu Dhabi Commercial Bank	بنك أبوظبي التجاري	Abu Dhabi	ADX: ADCB
Abu Dhabi Islamic Bank	مصرف أبوظبي الإسلامي	Abu Dhabi	ADX: ADIB
Ajman Bank	مصرف عجمان	Ajman	DFM: AJMANBANK
Al Hilal Bank	مصرف الهلال	Abu Dhabi	Acquired by ADCB group
Al Maryah Community Bank (Mbank)	بنك المارية المحلي	Abu Dhabi	Private Company
Bank of Sharjah	بنك الشارقة	Sharjah	ADX: BOS
Commercial Bank International	البنك التجاري الدولي	Dubai	ADX: CBI
Commercial Bank of Dubai	بنك دبي التـجاري	Dubai	DFM: CBD
Dubai Islamic Bank	بنــك دبي الإســلامي	Dubai	DFM: DIB
Emirates Investment Bank	بنك الإمارات للاستثمار	Dubai	DFM: EIBANK
Emirates Islamic	الإمارات الإسلامي	Dubai	DFM: EIB
Emirates NBD	بنك الإمارات دبي الوطني	Dubai	DFM: EMIRATESNBD
First Abu Dhabi Bank	بنك أبوظبي الأول	Abu Dhabi	ADX: FAB
Invest Bank	بنك الاستثمار	Sharjah	ADX: INVESTB
Mashreq	بنك المشرق	Dubai	DFM: MASQ
National Bank of Fujairah	بنك الفجيرة الوطني	Fujairah	ADX: NBF
RAKBANK	بنك رأس الخيمة الوطني	Ras Al Khaimah	ADX: RAKBANK
National Bank of Umm Al-Qaiwain	بنك أم القيوين الوطني	Umm Al Quwain	ADX: NBQ
Ruya Community Islamic Bank	مصرف رويا المحلي الإسلامي	Ajman	Private Company
Sharjah Islamic Bank	مصرف الشارقة الإسلامي	Sharjah	ADX: SIB
United Arab Bank	البنك العربي المتحد	Sharjah	ADX: UAB
Wio Bank	ويو بنك	Abu Dhabi	Private Company
Zand Bank	زاند بنك	Dubai	Private Company

== List of Foreign Banks (including wholesale banks) ==
Bank Name	Bank name (in Arabic)	Head Office (in UAE)	Country	Stock code
National Bank of Bahrain	بنك البحرين الوطني	Abu Dhabi	Bahrain	BSB: NBB
Gulf International Bank	بنك الخليج الدولي	Abu Dhabi	Bahrain	
Janata Bank Limited		Abu Dhabi	Bangladesh	
Bank of China Limited		Abu Dhabi	China	
Agricultural Bank of China Ltd.		Dubai	China	
Banque Misr	بنك مصر	Dubai	Egypt	
Arab African International Bank	البنك العربي الافريقي الدولي	Dubai	Egypt	
Credit Agricole		Dubai	France	
BNP Paribas		Abu Dhabi	France	
Banque Banorient France		Dubai	France	
Deutsche Bank		Abu Dhabi	Germany	
Bank of Baroda	بنك برودا	Dubai	India	NSE: BANKBARODA
Bank Melli Iran		Dubai	Iran	TSE: BANK1
Bank Saderat Iran		Dubai	Iran	TSE: BSDR1
Rafidain Bank	مصرف الرافدين	Abu Dhabi	Iraq	
Intesa Sanpaolo		Abu Dhabi	Italy	
Arab Bank	البنك العربي	Abu Dhabi	Jordan	ASE: ARBK
Al Ahli Bank of Kuwait	بنك الاهلي	Dubai	Kuwait	
National Bank of Kuwait		Dubai	Kuwait	
National Bank of Oman	البنك الوطني العماني	Abu Dhabi	Oman	MSX: NBOB
Habib Bank	حبيب بنك المحدود	Dubai	Pakistan	PSX: HBL
United Bank		Dubai	Pakistan	PSX: UBL
MCB Bank		Dubai	Pakistan	PSX: MCB
Bank Alfalah	بنك الفلاح	Dubai	Pakistan	
Al Khaliji	الخليجي	Dubai	Qatar	
Doha Bank		Dubai	Qatar	
Saudi National Bank		Dubai	Saudi Arabia	TADAWUL:SNB
KEB Hana Bank		Abu Dhabi	South Korea	
BOK International Bank		Abu Dhabi	Sudan	
Habib Bank A.G Zurich		Dubai	Switzerland	
HSBC Bank Middle East		Dubai	United Kingdom	LSE: HSBA NYSE: HSBC
Standard Chartered		Dubai	United Kingdom	LSE: STAN
NatWest Markets		Dubai	United Kingdom	
Barclays		Dubai	United Kingdom	
Citibank N. A.	سيتي بنك	Dubai	United States	NYSE: C
American Express	أمريكان إكسبريس	Abu Dhabi	United States	NYSE: AXP
El Nilein Bank	بنك النيلين	Abu Dhabi		

== See also ==
- List of banks in the Arab world
