= Abdul Rahman Saif Al Ghurair =

Emirati businessman

- Born: 1959 (age 66–67)
- Occupation: Businessman
- Title: Chairman, Al Ghurair Group
- Parent: Saif Ahmad Al Ghurair (father)
- Family: Al Ghurair family
- Awards: Lifetime Achievement Award, Middle East Business Leadership Awards (2011)

Abdul Rahman Saif Al Ghurair (born 1959) is an Emirati businessman. He is the chairman of the Al Ghurair Group, one of the oldest and largest diversified family-owned conglomerates in the United Arab Emirates.

== Career ==
Al Ghurair has chaired the Al Ghurair Group since 2008.

He has been a board member of Mashreq Bank, the UAE’s oldest privately held bank, since 2003, and also serves on the boards of the Commercial Bank of Dubai, Oman Insurance Company, Masafi Mineral Water, the National Cement Company, and Otis Elevator Company (Middle East).

He is also the chairman of Al Ghurair Exchange.

From 2008 to 2015, Al Ghurair was chairman of the Dubai Chamber of Commerce and Industry, where he helped launch the Dubai: Capital of the Islamic Economy initiative. He has also been a member of the Dubai Economic Council since 2003.

== Personal life ==
Al Ghurair is the son of Emirati businessman Saif Ahmad Al Ghurair, the founder of the Al Ghurair Group. He has five brothers.

In 2011, he received the Lifetime Achievement Award at the Middle East Business Leadership Awards.
