= Abu Dhabi Investment Council =

Investment arm of the government of Abu Dhabi

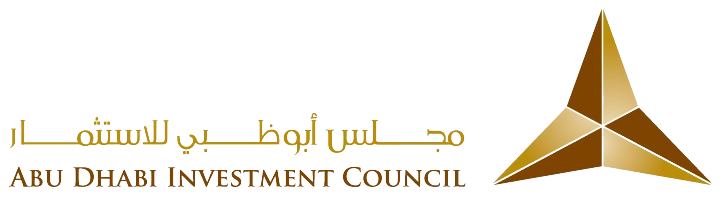
- Type: Subsidiary
- Industry: Institutional investor
- Founded: 2007; 19 years ago
- Headquarters: Abu Dhabi, United Arab Emirates
- Key people: Khaldoon Al Mubarak (chairman); Saeed Al Mazrouei (managing director & ceo)
- Number of employees: 450 (2026)
- Parent: Mubadala Investment Company
- Website: adcouncil.ae/

The Abu Dhabi Investment Council (Arabic: مجلس أبوظبي للاستثمار; ADIC or the "Council") is one of the investment arms of the government of Abu Dhabi. It started operations in April 2007, as a spin-off of the Abu Dhabi Investment Authority (ADIA). ADIC is responsible for investing the government's surplus, targeting positive capital returns through diversified asset classes and active investments. In March 2018, Abu Dhabi Executive Council issued a law reorganising ADIC under the ownership of Mubadala.

== History ==
The Abu Dhabi Investment Council was splintered off from ADIA in 2007 and took over all local subsidiaries previously owned by ADIA including Abu Dhabi Commercial Bank, National Bank of Abu Dhabi and Abu Dhabi Investment Company (Invest AD). Since 2013 the council has been based at Al Bahr Towers. In March 2018, Abu Dhabi Executive Council issued a law reorganising ADIC under the ownership of Mubadala.

== Investment strategy ==
The investment strategy the council is to deliver superior long-term risk-adjusted returns while preserving capital. Although the council invests globally, there is a strong focus of investing in Abu Dhabi's economy. Some of its significant past investments have included:

- National Bank of Abu Dhabi
- Abu Dhabi Commercial Bank
- Union National Bank
- Al Hilal Bank
- Abu Dhabi National Insurance Company
- Abu Dhabi Aviation Company
- Abu Dhabi Investment Company (Invest AD)
- Abu Dhabi National Chemicals Company

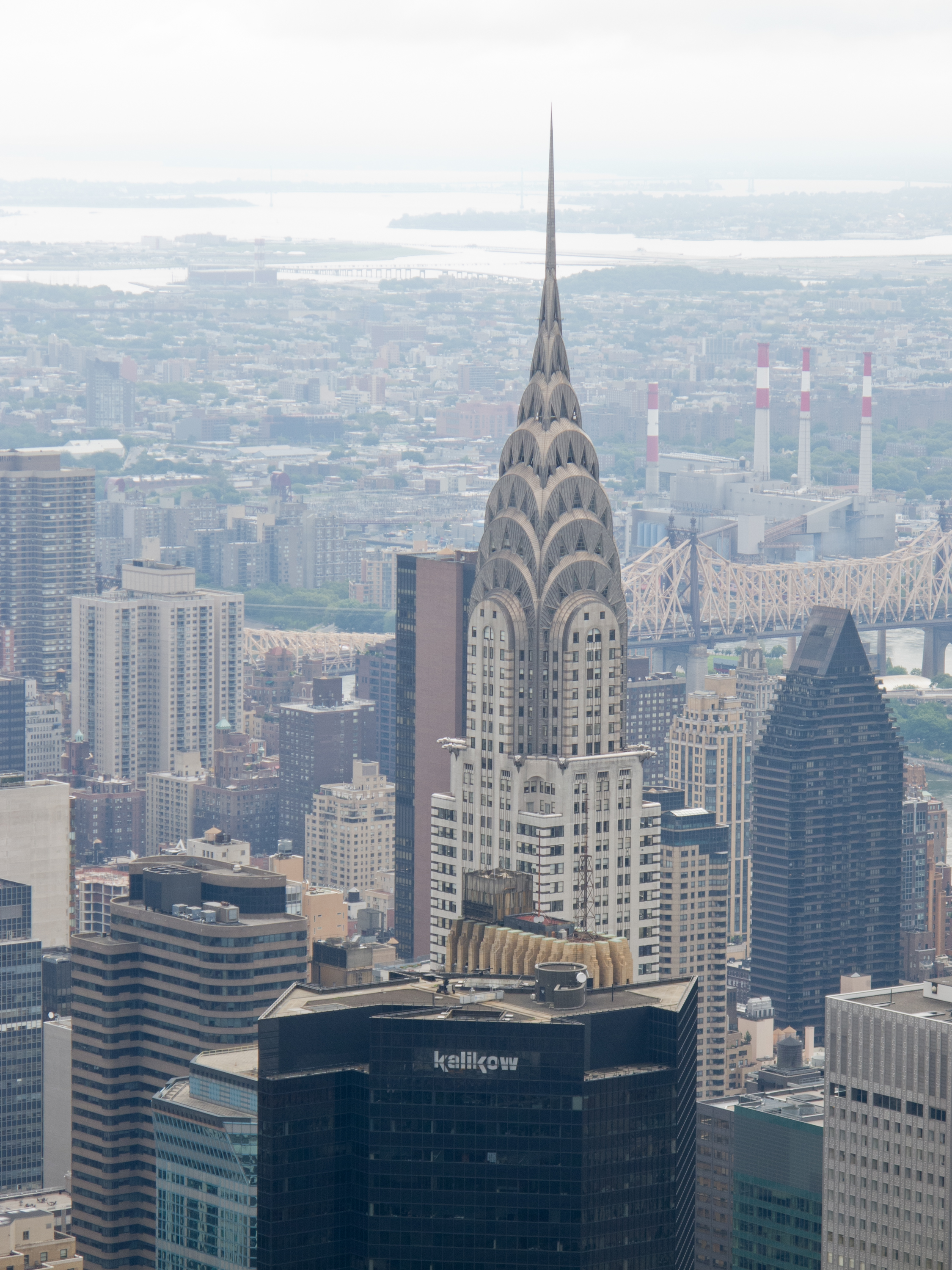
Chrysler Building - By Carlos Delgado

Notably in 2008, the Council acquired 90% ownership of New York's landmark Chrysler Building.

== Business functions ==
=== Active Investment Strategies ===
The active investment strategies department aims to generate superior risk adjusted returns by investing in hedge funds and similar active trading mandates globally.

=== Direct Investments ===
The direct investments department focuses on investing directly in listed and unlisted companies across the globe, with a special emphasis on the Middle East and North Africa. It is also responsible for monitoring and optimizing the value of the council's legacy portfolio.

=== Equities and Fixed Income ===
The equities and fixed income department manages listed portfolios that include global, regional and emerging market equities; and fixed income securities that include sovereign and global inflation-linked securities.

=== Global Special Situations ===
The Special Situations Unit invests in one-off opportunities that may not fit in any of the council's asset classifications yet generate a higher return than other asset classes. These investments are placed both directly and through managed funds.

=== Infrastructure Investments ===
The Infrastructure Investments Department is responsible for building a portfolio of global infrastructure investments and contributing to the growth of the local economy through participation in local developments. Its investments target large-scale public systems including transportation, communication, utilities and power grids. The investments are primarily made by externally managed funds, but also includes the possibility of co-investments in infrastructure projects.

=== Private Equity ===
The private equity department places funds in global private equity markets and invests directly primarily alongside its managers.

== Board of directors ==
The board of directors is the highest authority within the council and is composed of a chairman, managing director and other board members, all of whom are senior government officials appointed by decree from the ruler of Abu Dhabi.

- Chairman of the Board:
- Sheikh Mohammad Bin Zayed Al Nahyan
- Members of the Board:
- Eissa Mohamed Al Suwaidi (managing director)
- Sheikh Sultan Bin Zayed Al Nahyan
- Sheikh Mansour Bin Zayed Al Nahyan
- Sheikh Hamed Bin Zayed Al Nahyan
- Mohammed Bin Habroush Al Suwaidi
- Younis Haji Khoori

== See also ==
- Abu Dhabi Fund for Development
