= List of largest companies of the United Arab Emirates =

This article lists the Largest companies of the United Arab Emirates in terms of their revenue, net profit and total assets, according to the American business magazines Fortune and Forbes, as well as insights provided by Global Database, a UK-based B2B data provider.

== 2024 Global Database list ==
This list ranks the Top 7 companies in the United Arab Emirates by profit for 2024, based on data from Global Database, a UK-based B2B data provider.

The figures below are given in millions of US dollars. The list includes company headquarters, net profit, number of employees worldwide, and industry sector.

Rank	Name	Industry	Revenue (USD millions)	Profits (USD millions)	Employees	Headquarters
1	Emirates Group	Airline	32,600	3,200	100,000+	Dubai
2	Etihad Airways	Airline	6,800	544	20,000	Abu Dhabi
3	TAQA	Energy	13,500	1,500	5,000+	Abu Dhabi
4	ADNOC Distribution	Fuel	7,800	1,200	10,000+	Abu Dhabi
5	First Abu Dhabi Bank	Banking	9,500	3,400	6,000+	Abu Dhabi
6	Emirates NBD	Banking	8,860	3,100	14,000+	Dubai
7	DP World	Logistics	18,250	1,030	50,000+	Dubai

== 2024 Fortune list ==
This list displays all UAE companies in the Fortune Global 500, which ranks the world's largest companies by annual revenue. The figures below are given in millions of US dollars and are for the fiscal year 2023. Also listed are the headquarters location, net profit, number of employees worldwide and industry sector of each company.

Rank	Fortune 500 rank	Name	Industry	Revenue (USD millions)	Profits (USD millions)	Employees	Headquarters
1	492	Emirates Group	Airline	32,638	4,692	112,406	Dubai

== 2024 Forbes list ==
This list is based on the Forbes Global 2000, which ranks the world's 2,000 largest publicly traded companies. The Forbes list takes into account a multitude of factors, including the revenue, net profit, total assets and market value of each company; each factor is given a weighted rank in terms of importance when considering the overall ranking. The table below also lists the headquarters location and industry sector of each company. The figures are in billions of US dollars and are for the year 2023. All 9 companies from the United Arab Emirates are listed.

Rank	Forbes 2000 rank	Name	Headquarters	Revenue (billions US$)	Profit (billions US$)	Assets (billions US$)	Value (billions US$)	Industry
1	215	International Holding Company	Abu Dhabi	17.3	8.1	92.2	239.5	Conglomerate
1	242	First Abu Dhabi Bank	Abu Dhabi	20.8	4.3	336.3	36.6	Banking
3	260	Emirates Group	Dubai	20.2	5.7	234.9	28.6	Airline
4	395	TAQA	Abu Dhabi	14.2	2.0	58.0	88.8	Oil and gas
5	473	Etisalat	Abu Dhabi	15.0	2.8	40.2	38.1	Telecommunication
6	577	Abu Dhabi Commercial Bank	Abu Dhabi	9.9	2.2	161.9	16.7	Banking
7	720	Emaar Properties	Dubai	7.8	3.1	38.9	18.2	Real estate
8	900	Dubai Islamic Bank	Dubai	5.4	1.7	85.6	10.9	Banking
9	927	Mashreq	Dubai	5.2	2.3	65.3	10.3	Banking
10	1002	Abu Dhabi Islamic Bank	Abu Dhabi	3.9	1.4	53.0	11.8	Banking
11	1334	Borouge	Abu Dhabi	5.7	1.1	9.2	20.0	Chemicals
12	1581	Commercial Bank of Dubai	Dubai	2.2	0.7	35.1	5.3	Banking

== See also ==
- List of companies of the United Arab Emirates
- List of largest companies by revenue
