= Abdulla Al Ghurair =

Emirati businessman

- Born: 1929 or 1930 (age 96–97)
- Occupations: Founder and chairman, Mashreqbank
- Spouse: Married
- Children: 4, including Abdul Aziz Al Ghurair
- Relatives: Saif Ahmad Al Ghurair (brother)

Abdulla bin Ahmad Al Ghurair (Arabic: عبد الله الغرير; born c. 1930) is an Emirati billionaire businessman, the founder and chairman of Mashreq, an Emirati bank.

He has, according to Forbes, a net worth of $4.8 billion in 2025.

== Early life and career ==
Al Ghurair is a member of a prominent Emirati business family. His brother Saif Ahmad Al Ghurair (1924–2019), was a fellow billionaire and head of the Al Ghurair Group.

In 1967, Al Ghurair founded Mashreqbank. In October 2019 he stepped down as Chairman, but remained as a board member. Under the Jenan brand, his company Al Ghurair Food sold pasta.

His construction company was involved in building the Dubai Metro. It is also the constructor of the exterior cladding of the world´s tallest building, Burj Khalifa.

Al Ghurair was considered to be the richest person in the United Arab Emirates (UAE) and the 809th richest in the world as of 17 February 2021.

According to Forbes, Al Ghurair has a net worth of $3.1 billion as of January 2022.

In 1975, Oman Insurance was launched by Abdullah Al Ghurair. On 6 October 2022, Oman Insurance has rebranded to Sukoon.

== Philanthropy ==
=== Abdulla Al Ghurair Foundation ===
Before the foundation was founded in 2015, Al Ghurair was a supporter of the development of the educational sector in the UAE, where he built several schools in the early 1960's. The Abdulla Al Ghurair Foundation (AGF) is a non-profit, philanthropic organization dedicated to provide educational opportunities to students in the Arab region.

In June 2021, AGF announced the launch of the Abdulla Al Ghurair Hub for Digital Teaching and Learning. This will be a partnership with the American University of Beirut (AUB) and be based out of the Maroun Semaan Faculty of Engineering and Architecture (MSFEA) providing improved access to online education to thousands of Arab students across the region.

== Personal life ==
Al Ghurair lives in Dubai. He is married, with four children. His son Abdul Aziz Al Ghurair is CEO of Mashreqbank and chairman of Al Ghurair Investment.

== Awards ==
Ghurair was appointed the first Goodwill Ambassador for education in the Arab world in 2016 by the Arab League Educational, Cultural and Scientific Organization (ALECSO).
