= Smartbond =

Smartbond may refer to:

- Smartbond (monetary system), a non-governmental, independent monetary system
- Smart bond (finance), a financial bond instantiated in a smart contract
