= Emirates Islamic =

Sharia-compliant bank in Dubai

- Native name: الإمارات الإسلامي
- Type: Public bank
- Traded as: DFM: EIB
- ISIN: AEE000501016
- Industry: Banking
- Founded: 2004; 22 years ago
- Headquarters: Dubai, United Arab Emirates
- Number of locations: 36 (2025)
- Key people: Hesham Abdulla Al Qassim (Chairman); Farid AlMulla (CEO)
- Revenue: AED 3,34 billion (2025) (USD 910 million)
- Operating income: AED 5,96 billion (2025) (USD 1,62 billion)
- Total assets: AED 145 billion (2025) (USD 39,75 billion)
- Total equity: AED 17,7 billion (2025) (USD 4,83 billion)
- Number of employees: 1610 (2025)
- Website: www.emiratesislamic.ae

Emirates Islamic (formerly known as Emirates Islamic Bank; Arabic: الإمارات الإسلامي) is one of the four Islamic banks in Dubai, United Arab Emirates. The bank was established in 2004 to provide banking services in line with Shari'a principles. It offers products designed for individuals and small businesses as well as large corporations.

By 2025 the bank had more than 860,000 bank accounts.

== History ==
In March 2019, Emirates Islamic received the "Most Innovative Islamic Bank" award from Islamic Finance News.

In October 2019, Emirates Islamic was named "Best Islamic Bank in the U.A.E." at the Global Industry Awards.

In April 2019, Emirates Islamic announced it had launched banking via WhatsApp, saying it was the first Islamic bank to do so.

As of December 2024, Emirates Islamic operated 40 branches in the U.A.E.

In May 2025, Euromoney named Emirates Islamic "world’s best Islamic digital bank" for 2025.

In June 2025, Emirates Islamic announced it was delisting from the Dubai Financial Market (DFM), after Emirates NBD acquired all remaining shares.

Emirates Islamic was ranked 41st on Forbes Middle East's Top 100 Listed Companies 2025 list.

In April 2026, Emirates Islamic launched the U.A.E.'s first digital investment service that would let customers invest in certified physical gold and silver bars through a mobile app.

In May 2026, Islamic Bank helped Middle East Specialised Cables Company (MESC) secure Sharia-compliant banking facilities worth 110 million UAE dirhams ($30 million).

== See also ==
- List of banks in the United Arab Emirates
