= Al Bahr Towers =

Coordinates: 24.4566°N 54.4009°E

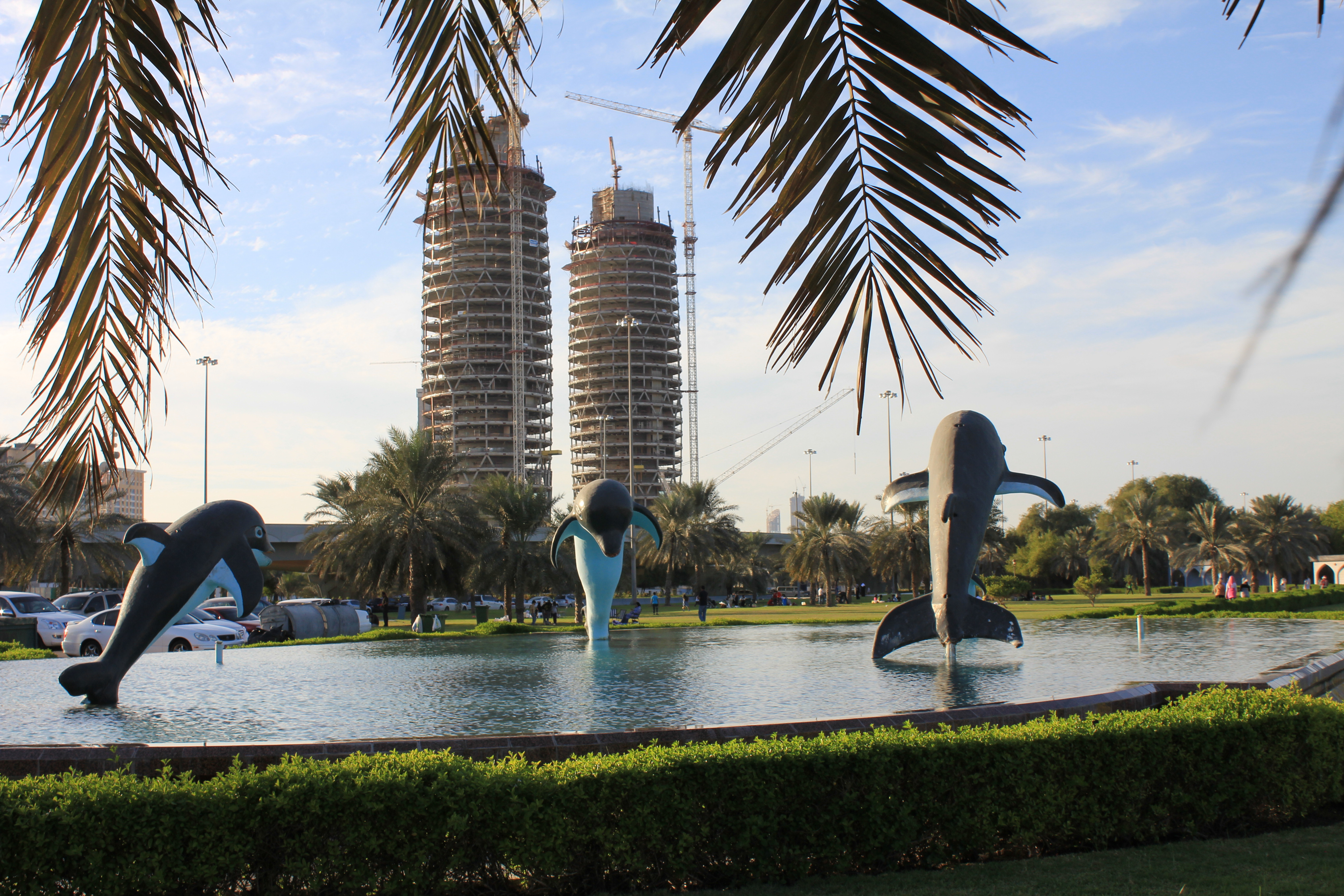
- Al Bahr Towers under construction

- Location within United Arab Emirates

General information
- Type: Offices
- Architectural style: Islamic architecture
- Location: Abu Dhabi, United Arab Emirates
- Client: Abu Dhabi Investment Council

Height
- Height: 145 m (476 ft)

Technical details
- Floor count: 25
- Floor area: 70,000 sq m

Design and construction
- Architecture firm: AHR
- Main contractor: Al-Futtaim Carillion

Al Bahr Towers is a development in the emirate of Abu Dhabi consisting of two 29-storey, 145m–high towers. It is located at the intersection of Al Saada and Al Salam Street in Abu Dhabi City, the capital of the United Arab Emirates, at the eastern entrance. One tower houses the new headquarters of the Abu Dhabi Investment Council (ADIC), an investment arm of the Government of Abu Dhabi. The other serves as the head office of Al Hilal Bank, a progressive and innovative Islamic Bank.

== Description ==
The distinguishing aspect of the towers is their protective skin of 2,000 umbrella-like glass elements that automatically open and close depending on the intensity of sunlight. Inspired by the 'mashrabiya', geometrically-designed wooden lattice screens that have been used to fill windows of traditional Arabic architecture since the 14th century, the 'intelligent' façade of the Al Bahr Towers is dynamically controlled by a building management system. The adjustable shades help reduce interior heat gains caused by sunlight by around 50 percent. The eco-friendly towers are one of the first buildings in the Persian Gulf region to receive the Leadership in Energy and Environmental Design (LEED) Silver rating. They were placed second at the Emporis Skyscraper Award – the world's premier honorary event for high-rise architecture – for projects completed in 2012. The development has also been featured on the Chicago-based Council on Tall Buildings and Urban Habitat's "Innovative 20" list of buildings that "challenge the typology of tall buildings in the 21st century". Al Bahr Towers is designed by AHR (formerly Aedas UK), and constructed by Al-Futtaim Carillion, a Dubai-based provider of integrated solutions for infrastructure, building, and services.
