= Arab Center for Consultancy & Economic Studies =

Emirati organization headquartered in Abu Dhabi

- المركز العربي للاستشارات والدراسات الاقتصادية
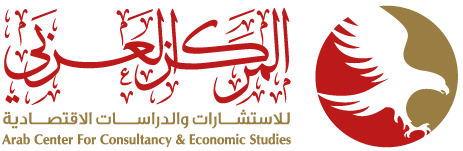
- Formation: November 1, 2006; 20 years ago
- Founder: Atef Elromhe
- Founded at: Abu Dhabi
- Type: Private organization
- Purpose: Feasibility Studies Center
- Headquarters: Al Yasmeen Tower, Airport Road, Abu Dhabi, United Arab Emirates
- Coordinates: 24.4651368°N 54.3728729°E
- Region served: Middle East
- Official languages: Arabic and English
- Chief Executive Officer: Atef Elromhe
- Website: drassat.com/home/index.php/en/

Arab Center for Consultancy & Economic Studies (Arabic: المركز العربي للاستشارات والدراسات الاقتصادية) is an Emirati organization headquartered in Abu Dhabi and specialized in preparation of economic feasibility studies. Its primary aim is to support the economic development of UAE, and to improve the environment for investment in UAE as well as the Middle East. It was founded by Atef Elromhe in November 2006.

== History ==
Arab Center for Consultancy & Economic Studies was founded by Atef Elromhe in November 2006 in Abu Dhabi, United Arab Emirates.

== Objectives ==
The objectives of the organization are:

1. To conduct economic feasibility studies for both public and private sector projects in accordance with high economic and international standards.
2. To support the economic development and to improve the environment for investment in UAE as well as the Middle East through detailed feasibility studies of ideas, operations and financing of a project.
3. To contribute in achieving the Emirati government's UAE Vision 2021, which aims to achieve an overall social, economic and educational development of the Emirate.
4. To contribute significantly in achieving the Emirati government's Abu Dhabi Economic Vision 2030, which aims to diversify the economy of the Emirate by increasing the contribution of non-oil sector.
5. To cooperate with domestic and regional organizations to provide consultancy and expertise for public and private sector institutions.
6. To support and develop the Small & Medium Enterprises (SME) program through advisory and assistance package for entrepreneurs.
7. To provide business development consultation, to reorganize public and private institutions and companies, to plan the efficient use of human resources and to develop the organizational structures.

== Products and services ==
Arab Center for Consultancy & Economic Studies is a service-based organization with large and diverse portfolios of products and services. It primarily specializes in preparation of feasibility studies of the Economic, Operational and Human Resource aspects of a project idea. As of 2019, these offerings fall into the categories of:

1. Feasibility study - It consists of a wide and diverse range of fields for which feasibility studies are conducted such as Economic, Commercial, Industrial, Healthcare, Tasheel, Tadbeer, Tawjeeh, Tawafoq and Amer
2. Consultancy reports on management of resources
3. Devising Strategic Work Plans to execute and implement an idea.
4. Negotiations management of a project with banks for new loans or refinancing of existing loans.
5. Land allotment assistance for both commercial and industrial projects.
6. PESTLE Analysis :- A concept of marketing policies.
7. Restructuring of insolvent companies.
8. Devise and develop risk management strategies.
9. Conducting tests for Non-Ignorance and Due-Diligence.
10. Operational (OP) and financial planning (FP) of the goals of an organization.

== Region served ==
Services and consultancy of Arab Center for Consultancy & Economic Studies are available primarily in its home country of United Arab Emirates, Gulf Cooperation Council countries and the Middle East region. All major cities of the emirate Abu Dhabi, Dubai, Sharjah, Ras al-Khaimah, Ajman, Fujairah and Umm Al Quwain are served by the organization.

== See also ==
- UAE Vision 2021
- Abu Dhabi Economic Vision 2030
- List of companies of the United Arab Emirates
- Economy of the United Arab Emirates
- List of largest companies of the United Arab Emirates
