= Charman =

Charman is an English surname. Notable people with the surname include:

- Jamie Charman (born 1982), Australian football player
- Janet Charman (born 1954), New Zealand poet
- John Charman (born 1953), English businessman
- Luke Charman (born 1997), English footballer
- Matt Charman (born 1979), British screenwriter and playwright
- Roy Charman (1930–1990), English sound engineer
- Terry Charman (1950–2019), English historian
- William Charman (1850–1924), English cricketer
