= Saif Ahmad Al Ghurair =

Emirati businessman

- Born: 1924; Dubai
- Died: 27 August 2019 (aged 94–95); Dubai
- Resting place: Qusais Cemetery, Dubai
- Occupation: Businessman
- Title: Chairman, Al Ghurair Group
- Children: 6
- Relatives: Abdulla Al Ghurair (brother), Abdul Aziz Al Ghurair (nephew) Mohamed Saif Al Ghurair (son)

Saif Ahmad Al Ghurair (Arabic: سيف أحمد الغرير; 1924 – 27 August 2019) was an Emirati billionaire businessman, CEO of the Dubai-based Al-Ghurair Group, a large company in the UAE's real estate and manufacturing sectors. His family owns and leads the different business units of the group.

== Early life ==
Al Ghurair was born in 1924 on the shores of Dubai Creek, the eldest of five sons.

== Career ==
In 1960, he founded the Al Ghurair Group, a company which has interests in banking, steel and packaging. The group invested in real estate, retail and manufacturing.

In 2004, his group opened a second Burjuman Centre with an office tower, hotel, and luxury service apartments. He was also a significant shareholder in Mashreq.

In 2006, he formed the company Taghleef Industries through a merger of Dubai PolyFilm with Technopak of Egypt and AKPP in Oman, and it became one of the world’s largest manufacturers of polypropylene films, lamination, and food packaging.

In 2015, his net worth was estimated at $3.4 billion.

== Personal life ==
He was the eldest son of Ahmed Al Ghurair. He was married with six children, and lived in Dubai.

A stormy boat trip to India in the 1930s to sell dates left him blind in one eye.

== Death ==
Al Ghurair died in Dubai in August 2019, aged 95. He was buried in Qusais Cemetery, Dubai on 27 August 2019.

== See also ==
- List of Emiratis by net worth
