= Sukoon Insurance =

UAE insurance company

Oman Insurance Company P.S.C. ("Sukoon")
- Type: Public
- Traded as: DFM: OIC
- Industry: Insurance, reinsurance
- Founded: 1975; 51 years ago
- Headquarters: Dubai, United Arab Emirates
- Key people: Abdul Aziz Abdullah Al Ghurair (Chairman); Hammad Khan (Interim CEO)
- Products: Life, health, motor, property, casualty, liability, trade credit, marine and aviation insurance
- Revenue: ▲AED 3.54 billion (2021)
- Net income: ▲AED 206.1 million (2021)
- Total assets: ▲AED 7.57 billion (2021)
- Number of employees: 650
- Website: www.sukoon.com

Sukoon Insurance previously known as Oman Insurance Company (Arabic: شركة عُمان للتأمين "سكون" ش.م.ع) is a composite insurance company headquartered in Dubai, UAE that sells insurance for individuals and businesses in UAE and Oman. Established in 1975 with majority ownership by Mashreq Bank, Sukoon is one of the largest publicly listed insurers in the country. Abdul Aziz Abdullah Al Ghurair is the chairman and Hammad Khan is the Interim CEO of Sukoon.

== History ==
In 1975, Oman Insurance was launched by Abdulla Al Ghurair.

On 6 October 2022, Oman Insurance has rebranded to Sukoon.

On 6 August 2025, Jean-Louis Laurent Josi resigned as CEO of Sukoon Insurance, and was replaced with interim CEO Hammad Khan.

== Products ==
Oman Insurance Company provides Life, Medical, and General insurance covers including products such as Trade Credit insurance. Insurance feature verticals including Healthcare, Motor, Property, Travel, Life, Engineering, Marine Hull, Aviation & Space, Energy, Marine Cargo, and Liability.

With its head office in Deira, Dubai, Oman Insurance has 11 branches in UAE along with 2 agency managed branches in Sharjah and Dubai. The company currently employees over 650 staff, a network of agents, and works with international and local insurance brokers. The company also offers regional insurance products through its wholly owned subsidiaries in Oman and Turkey. Oman Insurance was the first to offer STP (Straight Through Processing), real-time motor policy issuance to its UAE customers in 2020.

== Operations ==
OIC has operations across most Emirates in the United Arab Emirates, as well as in Oman, Qatar, and a subsidiary in Turkey (Dubai Starr Sigorta). OIC has over 750 employees. OIC uses 12 branches, a call center, an exclusive network of agents, international and local brokers, tenders and bancassurance.

== Partnerships ==
=== Bupa ===
OIC partnered with Bupa in 2003. OIC acts as the exclusive insurer and local administrator in the UAE for Bupa's international health plans.

=== Generali ===
Oman Insurance partnered with Generali Global Pension to give retirement insurance plans in 2019. Oman Insurance is also a member of Generali's global network that offers multinational pooling and captive arrangements to multinationals. Oman Insurance also partnered with Generali in 2020 to offer home insurance to high net-worth clients in the UAE.

=== Coface ===
Coface is Oman Insurance's regional partner in UAE to sell credit insurance.
