= Salama (company) =

Emirati insurance company

Islamic Arab Insurance Company (Salama)
- Type: Public
- Traded as: DFM: SALAMA
- Industry: Takaful; Retakaful; Insurance
- Founded: 29 April 1979; 47 years ago
- Headquarters: Spectrum Building; Oud Metha, Dubai, United Arab Emirates
- Key people: H.E. Fahad AlQassim (Chairman); Mr. Fareed Lutfi Ali Hussain Al Harmouzi (Vice Chairman); Mr. Ahmad Mohammad Al Sadah (Board Member); Mrs. Maha Abdul Majeed Al-Fahim (Board Member); Mr. Saeed bin Mohammed Al Qassimi (Board Member); Mr. Mohamed Al Hashmi (Board Member); Mr. Ammar Ali Mohamed Jaber (Board Member); Mohamed Ali Bouabane (Group CEO)
- Products: Family takaful; General takaful; Motor takaful; Health takaful; Pet takaful; Home content takaful
- Website: www.salama.ae

Salama Islamic Arab Insurance Company (Arabic: الشركة الإسلامية العربية للتأمين) also known as Salama is a Dubai-based provider of Shariah-compliant Takaful. It is listed on the Dubai Financial Market and has a paid-up capital of AED 939 million (US$255 million).

It was founded in 1979.

== Regional offices ==
- Tariic Holding Company B.S.C, Kingdom of Bahrain
- Misr Emirates Takaful Life Insurance Co. (METLICO), Egypt
- Egyptian Saudi Insurance House, Egypt
- Salama Immobilier, Senegal
- Salama Assurances Algerie, Algeria
- Islamic Insurance Jordan, Jordan Award-winning solutions
