= Mohammed Shehadeh =

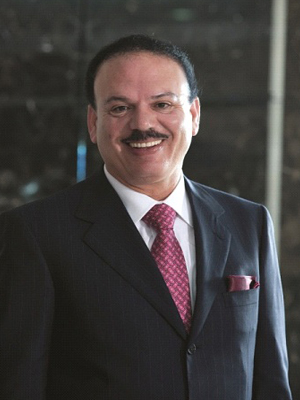
- Occupation: Senior Vice President of Unibeton Ready Mix
- Known for: Concrete Solution Provider, Sustainable Development Specialist

Dr. Mohammed Shehadeh (Arabic: محمد شحادة) a civil engineer, is the senior vice president of UNIBETON READY MIX. He is a graduate in Civil Engineering from Florida State University, USA and Doctorate in Engineering by Dalhousie University, Canada. He introduced SCC (Self Compacting Concrete ) for the first time in the UAE, and the Green Concrete or low carbon emission concrete in the UAE Market. He also introduced real time rheology which can measure, temperature, slump, equivalent normal pressures at different drum speed, yield of concrete and viscosity without the interference of humans this along with GPS system can be recorded for future analysis saving thousands of cubic meter of concrete which otherwise wasted in carrying out these tests. Implementation of new shotcrete methods to UAE market due to its many significant sustainability advantages on formwork, labour, speed and savings of 33-50% over conventional cast-in-place construction. His hobbies are farming and horse riding.

== Awards and honors ==
- Winner of Sheikh Khalifa Business Excellence Award.
- Winner of the prestigious Dubai Quality Appreciation Award – 2009.
- Winner of Sheikh Khalifa Industrial Award in 2000 and 1999.
- Winner of Stevie Award in 2010.
- Improved the image and trust in the company operations by adopting international standards and certified by M/s. Lloyds Register Quality Assurance for ISO 9001:2008, ISO 14001:2004 and OHSAS 18001:2007.
- Honorary Doctorate Degree by Dalhousie University.
