= Citibank United Arab Emirates =

Franchise subsidiary of Citigroup

Citibank N.A., United Arab Emirates
- Company type: Subsidiary of Citigroup
- Industry: Banking, financial services
- Founded: 1964; 62 years ago
- Headquarters: Citibank U.A.E. Al Wasl Branch; Dubai; United Arab Emirates
- Area served: United Arab Emirates
- Key people: Gonzalo Luchetti, Citi EMEA and Asia Head of Consumer Banking; Elissar Farah Antonios, Citi U.A.E. Chief Country Officer; Dinesh Sharma, Citi Middle East Head of Consumer Banking; Venkat Mahadevan, Citi Middle East Wealth Management Head
- Products: Credit cards Retail banking Commercial banking Investment banking Private banking Financial analysis E-Brokerage
- Website: www.citibank.ae

Citibank National Association, United Arab Emirates (Arabic: سيتي بنك) commonly known as Citibank U.A.E., is a franchise subsidiary of Citigroup, a multinational financial services corporation headquartered in New York City, United States. Citi U.A.E. is connected by a network spanning 98 markets across the world. The phone support call center for Citibank U.A.E. retail banking clients is based at Citibank Bahrain.

== History ==
Established in 1964, when the Citibank U.A.E., opened its first branch in Dubai. A second branch in Abu Dhabi was opened in 1971.

== Branches ==
Citibank U.A.E. has full service branches in only three of the seven Emirates, Abu Dhabi, Dubai and Sharjah.

== Products and services ==
Citibank U.A.E. offers consumers and institutions a range of financial products and services, including consumer banking and credit; corporate and investment banking; institutional equity research and sales; foreign exchange, credit cards, commercial banking; and an E-Brokerage.

=== Bank account requirements ===
Since 2015, Citibank U.A.E. requires new retail banking clients to maintain 35,000 AED, or multi-currency AED equivalent minimum balance for a basic current/checking account with a debit card.

=== Online brokerage ===
The Dubai International Financial Centre (DIFC) domiciled, Citibank U.A.E. E-Brokerage for DIY Investors. charges 1% of traded amount per transaction and 0.2% custody fees per year, calculated on the average balance of assets under custody and charged quarterly.

=== Capital Markets & Investment Banking Operations ===
In Dubai, operations are based at Dubai International Financial Centre (DIFC) licensed under Citigroup Global Markets Ltd. and Citibank, N.A. (DIFC Branch), started in 2006.

In Abu Dhabi, operations are based at Abu Dhabi Global Market (ADGM), licensed under Citibank N.A., started in 2018.

=== Offshore booking center ===
Citibank U.A.E. is also used an offshore booking center for loans, and other products, for tax efficiency purposes.

=== Digital wallet support ===
Citibank U.A.E. used to support their own Citi Pay digital wallet for their debit and credit cards. This mobile wallet was discontinued on 30 June 2019. Apple Pay is supported on Mastercard Credit Cards only and was rolled out on 15 September 2020. Google Pay was enabled for Citi Mastercard Credit Cards on 1 April 2023. Samsung Pay is not supported.

== See also ==
- List of banks in the United Arab Emirates
