= Smart bond (finance) =

Type of an automated financial bond that uses the capabilities of blockchains

A smart bond (or blockchain Bond) is a specific type of an automated bond contract that uses the capabilities of blockchain databases that can operate as cryptographically-secure yet open and transparent general ledgers. This is sometimes referred to as Distributed Ledger Technology (DLT). It is one of a class of financial instruments known as a smart contract, "a computerized transaction protocol that executes the terms of a contract."

This is in contrast to the traditional issuance process for bonds which can be a lengthy and highly technical process, which involves many intermediaries and stakeholders with sometimes conflicting objectives. A general lack of standardization in the primary markets increases information asymmetry and results in inefficient pricing, high costs, and long settlement times in the secondary market.

Blockchain bonds have the ability to potentially revolutionize financial capital markets by creating a decentralized database of unique digital assets. Securities using blockchain technology will be able to cut out the various middlemen that are present in a bond transaction and lower fees.

Issuers of bonds could be able to completely automate the entire bond issuance process through blockchain bonds. This would potentially result in shortened settlement and transaction times as well as greater transparency for the issuer in transactions. The increased transparency and automation of the process would remove the need for intermediaries and therefore generate increased savings for issuers.

== History ==
As of July 2021, the International Capital Market Association has listed the following blockchain bonds:

Smart Bond Issuances (as of August 2021)
| Issuer | Sale Date | Par Amount (USD Millions) | Issuance | Blockchain | Country |
|---|---|---|---|---|---|
| Commonwealth Bank of Australia | January, 2017 | N/A | N/A | Private Ethereum | Australia |
| Daimler AG | June 28, 2017 | 111 | 1-year Bond | Private Ethereum | Germany |
| Fisco | August 10, 2017 | 0.813 | 3-year Bond | Private Ethereum | China |
| Sberbank | May 18, 2018 | 12 | Commercial Bond | Hyperledger Fabric | Russia |
| World Bank | August 24, 2018 | 108 | 2 Tranche "bond-i" | Private Ethereum | Australia |
| Société Générale | April 18, 2019 | 112 | 5-year Covered Bond | Public Ethereum | France |
| Santander | September 12, 2019 | 20 | 1-year Bond | Public Ethereum | Spain |
| INVAO | September 27, 2019 | 20 | 10-year Bond | Public Ethereum | Lichtenstein |
| Bank of China | December 3, 2019 | 2,800 | 2-year Bond | Proprietary Blockchain | China |
| Bank of Thailand | September 11, 2020 | 1,600 | Savings Bond | IBM Blockchain | Thailand |
| Union Bank of the Philippines | December 7, 2020 | 190 | 3 and 5.25 year Dual Tranche Bond | Proprietary Blockchain | Philippines |
| Vonovia Investment Bank | January 13, 2021 | 24 | 3-year Bond | Stellar Blockchain | Germany |
| Société Générale | April 15, 2021 | 6 | Autocall, Euro Medium Term Notes | Tezos Public Blockchain | France |
| European Investment Bank | April 27, 2021 | 121 | 2-year Bond | Public Ethereum | France |

As early as 2014, banking executives were speaking publicly about the ability of blockchain technology to trigger significant "simplification of banking processes and cost structure."

As of 2015, UBS was experimenting with smart bonds that use the bitcoin blockchain in which "risk free interest rates and payment streams [could be] fully automated, creating a self-paying instrument." The Huffington Post reports than an announcement of the UBS smartbond service is expected in 2016.

In 2018, the World Bank mandated the Commonwealth Bank of Australia for the world's first blockchain bond.

On 28 November 2018, United Arab Emirates based Al Hilal Bank executed the world's first Blockchain Sukuk (Islamic Bond) on the Ethereum blockchain. Blockchain was used to transact a secondary market deal in Al Hilal Bank's $500 million Senior Sukuk, maturing September 2023. This was the first time Blockchain technology was utilized in the execution of a Sukuk transaction. The technology was built by Swiss-based blockchain developer, Jibrel AG.

== Characteristics of Smart Bonds ==
DLT bonds involve a distributed database maintained over a network of computers connected on a peer-to-peer basis, so that participants can share and keep identical, cryptographically secured records in a decentralized manner. Operation of a DLT network can involve the use of a public or private network that may contain digitally represented assets. Network participants conduct and verify transactions. This would eliminate the need for a centralized ledger maintained by a third party.

A blockchain bond is first issued in tokenized form into a digital asset ledger. Then, an investment bank creates a digital term sheet as part of a smart contract and receives the sign off from the issuer of the bond. Bids and orders from investors are recorded in the master book. The issuer, using Know Your Customer (KYC) details provided by a gatekeeping intermediary adds investors to the bond's blockchain. Tokens, representing cash or security are used to determine investor portfolio value. The deal reaches financial close after signing. Finally banks act as token keepers and transfer money or debt instruments to the beneficiary accounts.

== Applications of Smart Bonds ==
Many of the transactions using DLT have been experimental in nature over the past three years. Debt capital markets are looking at blockchain as a technology that will potentially disrupt the status quo. Blockchain bonds could add new efficiencies in the way that capital markets traditionally operate. Past experiments in DLT transactions show that blockchain can be used to increase reporting transparency, reduce the number of intermediaries, and reduce the length of the settlement process.

== Legislative Considerations ==
Legal and regulatory uncertainty around the use of DLT are one of the key challenges to its wider adoption. Regulation is generally neutral to technology however regulators in different countries have adopted different approaches to the use of DLT in financial markets.

In North America, as of 2019, there were 28 different DLT related regulations that have been adopted at the state level. Bills enacted in Arizona, Illinois and Maryland provide a legal definition of DLT/blockchain as well as clarifying the legal status of smart contracts. Other bills have provided support for the development of blockchain technology.
