= Abu Dhabi National Takaful Company =

Abu Dhabi National Takaful Company PSC
- Company type: Public
- Traded as: ADX: TKFL
- Industry: Takaful
- Founded: 16 November 2003; 22 years ago
- Headquarters: Tamouh Tower; Al Reem Island, Abu Dhabi, United Arab Emirates
- Key people: Khamis Buharoon (Chairman); Osama Abdeen (CEO)
- Products: General Takaful and Family Takaful
- Revenue: ▲AED 793 million (2024)
- Net income: ▲AED 83 million (2024)
- Total assets: ▲AED 1,558 million (2024)
- Total equity: ▲AED 495 million (2024)
- Website: www.takaful.ae

Abu Dhabi National Takaful Company PSC (Arabic: شركة أبوظبي الوطنية للتكافل ش.م.ع.) -- known simply as Takaful, تكافل, or ADNTC -- was established in 2003 by the Abu Dhabi Islamic Bank (ADIB) and Abu Dhabi Investment Company. It is a powerful player in the UAE takaful market, based in Abu Dhabi. It offers a range of takaful products including motor, property, general accidents, family, medical, engineering, and Marine cargo coverage. Its shares are traded on the Abu Dhabi Securities Exchange as TKFL.

== Ratings ==
ADNTC's rating by credit rating agencies are:

- AM Best has affirmed ADNTC's Financial Strength Rating of A− (Excellent) and the Long-Term Issuer Credit Rating of “a-” (Excellent). The Outlook is stable (12 December 2024).
- Fitch Ratings has affirmed ADNTC's Insurer Financial Strength (IFS) Rating at 'A−'. The Outlook is Stable (18 Feb, 2025).

== Recognition ==
The company has won various awards including 'Best Bancatakaful Operator Middle East' at the International Takaful Summit 2012, 'Takaful Operator of the Year' in the Middle East by INSUREX Conference & Awards in 2012 and 2013, and 'Takaful Insurer of the Year' for MENA at the MENA Insurance Review (MENAIR) Insurance Awards 2014.
