= List of Emiratis by net worth =

This is a list of Emirati billionaires based on an annual assessment of wealth and assets compiled and published by Forbes magazine.

== Emirati billionaires list ==
Name	Net worth (USD in billions)	Source of wealth
Pavel Durov	17.1	Technology
Hussain Sajwani	10.2	Real estate
Abdulla Al Futtaim	4.9	Auto dealers, investments
Abdulla Al Ghurair	4.8	Diversified

== See also ==
- The World's Billionaires
- List of countries by the number of billionaires
