= Unibeton Ready Mix =

Company of the United Arab Emirates

- Company type: Private
- Industry: Construction, Building materials
- Founded: 1980
- Headquarters: Abu Dhabi, United Arab Emirates
- Key people: Dr.Mohammed Shehadeh, (Senior Vice President) & (Board Member)
- Products: Ready-mix concrete
- Number of employees: 3000
- Website: www.unibetonrm.com

Unibeton is a building materials company based in Abu Dhabi, United Arab Emirates. Unibeton has annual production capacity of 10 million cubic meters and over 3000 employees. Unibeton has operations in Saudi Arabia, Qatar and India. Unibeton Ready-mix is part of Al Fara’a Group. The group comprises the construction, property and related services. Unibeton Ready Mix is one of the largest manufacturers and distributors of ready-mix concrete in GCC specialized in self-compacting concrete, low-cost, light weight, high strength, lean and insulated, low carbon emission - green concrete.

Unibeton has a presence throughout the United Arab Emirates and is the supplier of concrete to the Road and Transports Authority and Palm Island, Dubai. Unibeton also has international operations in Jeddah and Riyadh in Saudi Arabia, and in Doha, Qatar, plus offices in India, Turkey, Oman and Morocco and planning underway in Kuwait. Unibeton has moved into the Qatari and Saudi Arabian markets with projects such as the New Port of Qatar and King Abdullah Financial District in Riyadh and Airport Project in Jeddah, with hi-tech research and laboratory-batching plants in Riyadh and Jeddah.

Some of the major projects of Unibeton includes Palm Jumeirah, King Abdullah Financial District, New Doha Port Project, an Land Mark Tower. Unibeton employs over 3000 staff including research scientists, concrete technologists, geologists, engineers, technicians and other support staff.

== See also ==
- List of companies of the United Arab Emirates
