= Ajman Bank =

Emirati bank

- Native name: مصرف عجمان
- Type: Public Bank
- Traded as: DFM: AJMANBANK
- ISIN: AEA003201018
- Industry: Financial services
- Founded: 2007; 19 years ago
- Headquarters: Ajman, United Arab Emirates
- Area served: United Arab Emirates
- Key people: Mustafa Mohammed Saeed Al Khalfawi (CEO); Sheikh Ammar bin Humaid Al Nuaimi (Charman)
- Products: Banking services
- Revenue: 1.7 billion (USD 462 million) (2025)
- Total assets: 32.82 billion (USD 8.95 billion) (2025)
- Number of employees: 1000+
- Subsidiaries: Skyrise Properties
- Website: ajmanbank.ae

Ajman Bank (Arabic: مصرف عجمان) is a medium-sized Emirati bank headquartered in Ajman, United Arab Emirates.

== History ==
Ajman Bank was established in 2007, its shares were listed in Dubai Financial Market in February 2008, the bank is headquartered in Ajman and has several branches and ATMs throughout the UAE.

Ajman Bank is one of the first banks in the UAE to integrate the Jaywan card across its ATM network, allowing Jaywan cardholders to withdraw cash.

Ajman Bank was ranked 77th among the top 100 Arab banks.

In 2025, Ajman Bank issued a $500 million sukuk which were 5.4x oversubscribed from 100+ investors from around the world.

In the Q1 of 2026, Ajman Bank's total revenue was 443 million, a 22% increase from Q1 of 2025.

== Services ==
Ajman Bank provides, Retail, Corporate and Investment banking services.

== See also ==
List of banks in United Arab Emirates
