= Abu Dhabi Fund for Development =

Foreign aid agency

- Abu Dhabi Fund for Development logo
- Formation: 1971; 55 years ago
- Type: foreign aid agency
- Location: Abu Dhabi, United Arab Emirates
- Chairman: Mansour bin Zayed Al Nahyan
- Website: https://www.adfd.ae/english/Pages/Home.aspx

The Abu Dhabi Fund for Development (ADFD) is a foreign aid agency established by the government of Abu Dhabi in 1971. The fund provides concessionary loans to fund economic and social development projects. The fund also invests in order to expand and strengthen the private sector economies of its clients.

== History ==
ADFD was established in 1971 in order to manage the foreign aid programs of the United Arab Emirates. Since its founding until 2014, the fund disbursed AED22.5 billion in loans and AED39.8 billion in grants. Grants are funded by the government of Abu Dhabi but managed by the ADFD.

== Leadership ==
=== Mansour bin Zayed Nahyan ===
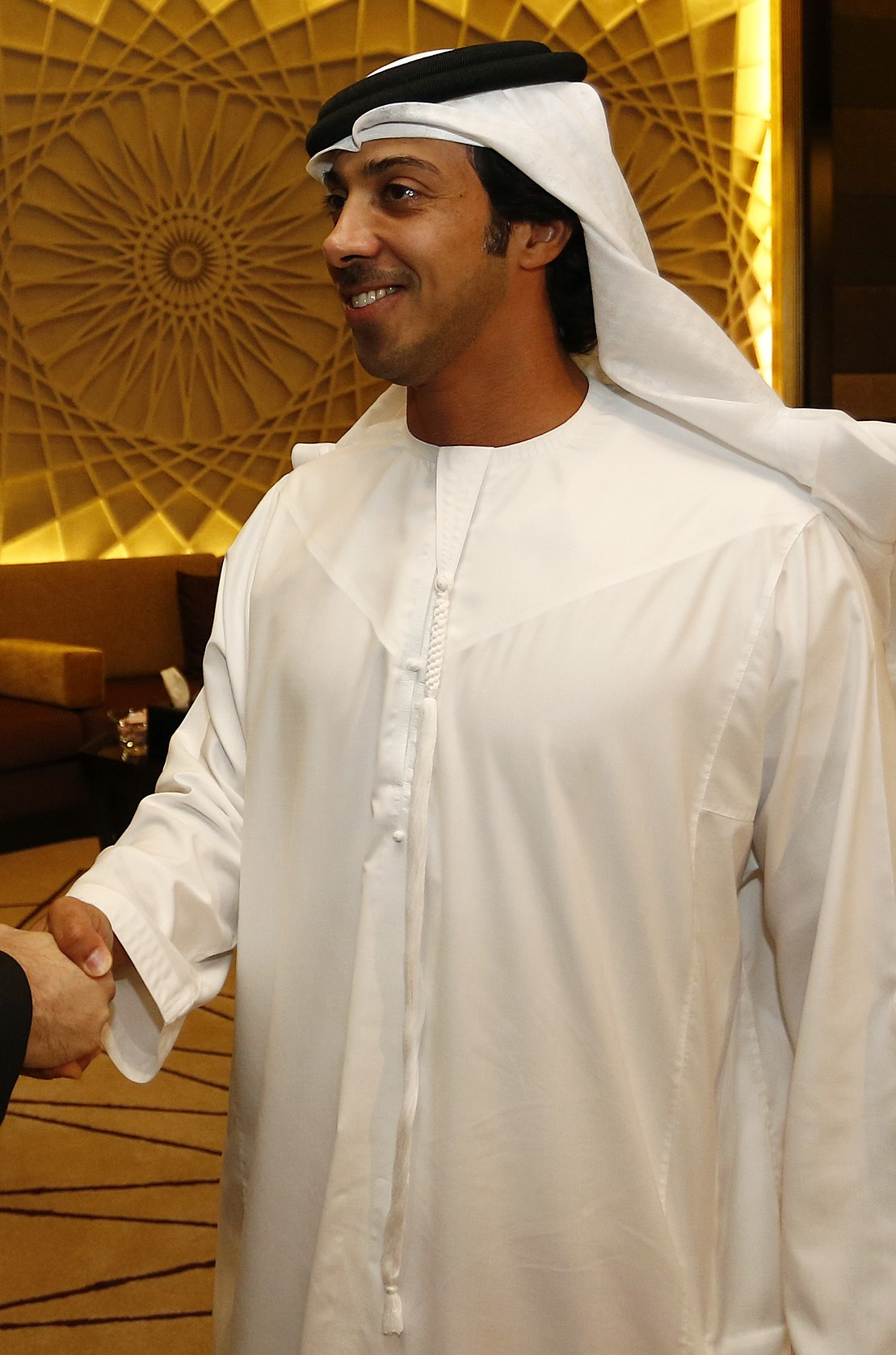
Mansour bin Zayed Nahyan

Sheikh Mansour bin Zayed Al Nahyan, Deputy Prime Minister and Minister of Presidential Affairs, is ADFD's chairman. Sheikh Mansour is also the chairman of the Emirates Investment Authority (the sole sovereign wealth fund of the United Arab Emirates federal government), the Abu Dhabi Judicial Department, the Abu Dhabi Food Control Authority, the National Archives of the United Arab Emirates, the Abu Dhabi International Petroleum Investment Company, the Khalifa bin Zayed Cerity Foundation, and the Erates Racing Authority. He owns stakes in a number of businesses, including Virgin Galactic and Sky News Arabia. He owns Abu Dhabi United Group, which acquired the Manchester City Football Club in 2008. He earned a bachelor's degree in international affairs in the United States in 1993.

== Projects and programs ==
=== IRENA/ADFD Project Facility ===
The ADFD works with the International Renewable Energy Agency (IRENA) to promote the rapid and widespread adoption of renewable energy. As of 2014, the ADFD has committed to providing US$350 million in concessionary loans to be disbursed through the IRENA/ADFD Project Facility over seven funding cycles. Loans from this program are solely for renewable energy projects in developing countries. Project selection began in 2012. In November 2014, the third cycle was announced. IRENA recommends projects for final approval by the ADFD.

As of December 2014, the ADFD reduced annual interest rates on this program's loans to one to two percent to encourage more countries to apply for funding. Projects have been approved in Ecuador, Mali, the Maldives, Mauritania, Samoa, Sierra Leone, Argentina, Cuba, Iran, Mauritania and St. Vincent and the Grenadines. A diverse mix of energy sources including solar, hydropower, biomass, wind, and conventional-renewal hybrids were represented. During the first two cycles, US$1.5 billion in funding was requested.

=== UAE-Pacific Partnership Fund ===
The ADFD, in partnership with Masdar, established the UAE-Pacific Partnership Fund in order to finance solar and wind power projects in Fiji, Kiribati, Samoa, Tuvalu, and Vanuatu. Masdar will design and implement these projects in cooperation with the governments of these countries. The ADFD will provide $50 million in funding. This money will cover project feasibility studies, engineering design, plant equipment supplies and installation, construction and operation and maintenance training.

=== Gulf Cooperation Council ===
In 2013, the UAE provided three development grants worth US$18,39 billion through two Gulf Cooperation Council (GCC) programs to support development in Jordan, Morocco and Bahrain. Of this, AED9.19 billion was allocated to Bahrain and AED4.6 billion to Jordan and Morocco.

== Arab world ==
In the Arab world, the ADFD has provided more than AED52.7 billion to finance projects in Bahrain, Oman, Jordan, Palestine, Egypt, Syria, Yemen, Sudan, Algeria, Mauritania, Tunisia, Lebanon, Somalia, Somaliland, Djibouti, Morocco and the Comoros Islands.

=== Morocco ===
In June 2013, the ADFD gave a US$1.25 billion grant to Morocco for projects to create sustainable growth and increase the standard of living. The grant was made under the Gulf Development Fund with total funding of US$5 billion for Morocco with equal contributions also coming Kuwait, Qatar, and Saudi Arabia. ADFD was placed in charge of administering the entire grant. The ADFD started providing aid to Morocco in 1976. Not including this grant, AED 2 billion in loans for 11 projects and AED 832 million for 21 projects have been given to Morocco.

ADFD funded the first phase of construction for the Tangier-Mediterranean Port with a loan of AED 734.6 million and a grant of AED 367.3 million for a total of AED 1.1 billion. As of December 2014, a second phase of construction was planned.

In December 2014, a 700-unit housing project funded by the ADFD in Asilah City was near completion. The ADFD said the three-phase project includes a museum, a school, and a bus station and will be turned over to the Moroccan government in early 2015. 400 units were completed in the first phase, 200 in the second phase, and 100 were scheduled for the third phase. This project was intended to benefit residents resettled from the city's slums. The project cost AED 73 million.

=== Yemen ===
Among the major projects managed by the ADFD in Yemen is Ma’rib Dam project, which was funded by a government grant in 1986. It is one of the largest development projects ever completed in Yemen.

=== Somaliland ===
In March 2022, The ADFD participated in the inauguration of the first bridge built as part of the Berbera-Hargeisa corridor project in Somaliland. This strategic initiative has been financed from the AED 330.5 million (US$89.9m) grant program provided by the United Arab Emirates for the country in 2017. The grant is managed by ADFD to finance various projects to drive sustainable development in Somaliland.

== Africa ==
The ADFD has provided around AED2.8billion to fund projects in Africa that have benefited countries including Mauritius, Seychelles, Gambia, Eritrea, Burkina Faso, Benin, Guinea, Tanzania, Lesotho, Senegal, Uganda, Congo, Congo Brazzaville, Kenya, Burundi, Guinea Bissau, Madagascar, Malawi, Mali, Niger, Sierra Leone, Ethiopia, Zambia, South Sudan and Cape Verde.

=== Sierra Leone ===
In 2014, the ADFD agreed to loan the government of Sierra Leone 33 million AED in order to build a solar power plant. The ADFD is providing 50 percent of funding with the remainder coming from Sierra Leone's government. This project, called "Solar Park Freetown," will add 6 megawatts of capacity. As of 2014, Sierra Leone had 96 megawatts of generating capacity but demand for 200 megawatts. The plant will be linked to the main power grid and will power an estimated 38,000 households containing 60,000 people. The plant will be built along the 21-kilometer Toke-Lumley highway, a transportation project funded by the ADFD with a 20 million AED loan in 2011. Both private and state enterprises will participate in the project. Masdar will be a key supplier. Mohammed Saif Al Suwaidi signed for ADFD and Dr. Kaifala Mara, minister of finance and economic planning, signed for Sierra Leone.

=== Madagascar ===
In 1979, the fund provided 15 million AED for the construction of the Andekaleka hydroelectric dam. As of 2014, this dam provided 58 megawatts of power.

In November 2014, the ADFD signed an agreement with Madagascar's government to provide 110 million AED in soft loans for infrastructure development. These loans will be used to build a two-lane road about 117 kilometers long and seven bridges. The road will be built between the towns of Soanierana Ivongo and Mananara Nord. These projects are designed to connect isolated rural areas, make crops easier to sell at market, reduce transportation costs, and increase tourism.

=== Mauritania ===
In May 2014, ADFD funded a solar project in Mauritania with a loan of 18.36 million AED.

== Asia ==
In Asia, the ADFD has financed projects worth AED3.691 billion in Indonesia, Bangladesh, India, Pakistan, Afghanistan, Sri Lanka, Malaysia, Mongolia, Armenia, Azerbaijan, Indonesia, Kazakhstan, Tajikistan, Kyrgyzstan, Turkmenistan, and the Maldives.

=== Tonga ===
The La'a Lahi, or "Big Sun," solar plant in Tonga was the first project funded through this program. The UAE-Pacific Partnership's projects are expected to save about 1.2 million liters of diesel and reduce carbon output by 3,030 tons each year. This program was launched in March 2013 at the direction of Sheikh Abdullah bin Zayed Al Nahyan, the UAE's foreign minister.

A 500KW solar project with battery storage on the Tongan island of Vava’u was also funded by the ADFD through a $5 million grant. Masdar was in charge of construction with the Australian firm Ingenero operating the plant. The plant was completed in late 2013.

=== Nepal ===
In 2013, the ADFD agreed to provide US$30 million for the Tanahun hydroelectric plant. The project is also being funded by the Asian Development Bank, Japan International Cooperation Agency, and the European Investment Bank. The dam will be located on the Seti River and will be a run-of-river plant. Construction began in 2014.

== See also ==
- Abu Dhabi Investment Council
