= Union National Bank =

Defunct Emirati bank

- Company type: Corporation
- Traded as: ADX: UNB
- Industry: Bank
- Founded: 1982; 44 years ago
- Founder: Agha Hasan Abedi
- Defunct: 2019; 7 years ago
- Fate: Merged with Abu Dhabi Commercial Bank and Al-Hilal
- Successor: ADCB
- Headquarters: Abu Dhabi, United Arab Emirates
- Website: https://www.unb.com

Union National Bank (UNB) was a bank based in Abu Dhabi, United Arab Emirates, from 1982 until it merged with Abu Dhabi Commercial Bank in 2019. The bank had its shares listed in the Abu Dhabi Securities Exchange (ADX) under the symbol UNB.

It was established as a Public Joint Stock Company in 1982, and became one of the UAE's leading domestic banks in the United Arab Emirates. The bank offered a variety of products and services to individuals and corporations. It had more than 50 branches and banking centers.

In 2006, during the Egyptian banking industry reforms, Alexandria Commercial and Maritime Bank was privatised and subsequently acquired by Union National Bank.

== Board of Directors ==
The board of directors of Union National Bank before its merger included:

- Nahyan bin Mubarak Al Nahyan (chairman)
- Mohammad Nasr Abdeen (vice chairman and managing director)
- Mohamed Dhaen Al Hamli (vice chairman)
- Yousef Abdulaziz Al Harmoodi (member)
- Mohammad Ali Al Khawaja (member)
- Ahmed Jasim Al Zaabi (member)
- Mohamed Tawfik Ezz Eldin (member)
- Mohamed Moustafa Abdel Atty (member)
