= National Bank of Fujairah =

Emirati bank

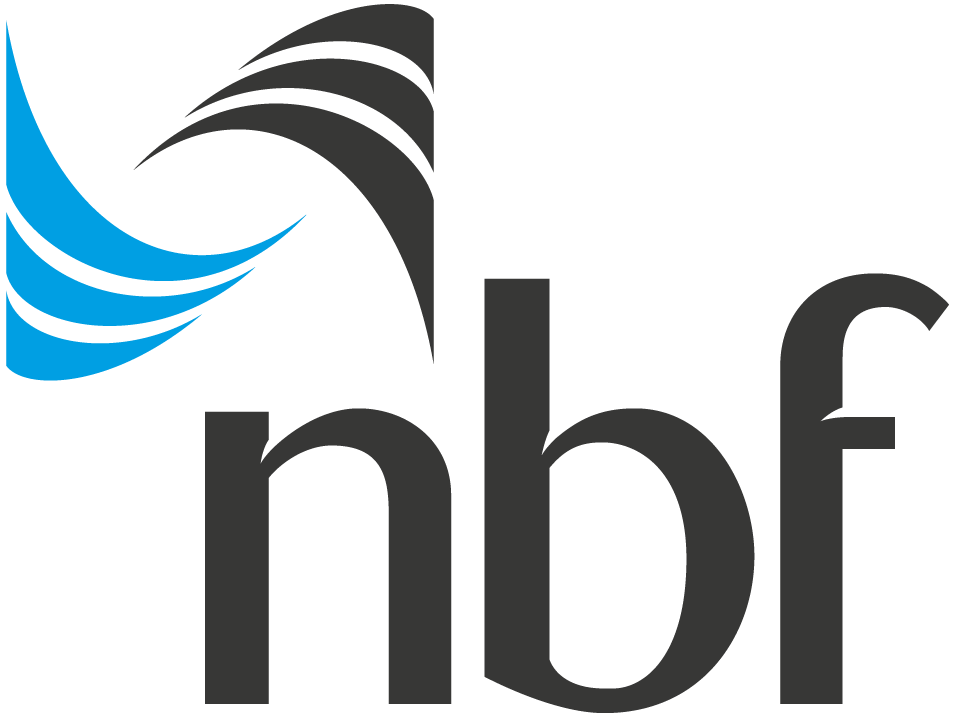
- Native name: بنك الفجيرة الوطني
- Type: Public bank
- Traded as: ADX: NBF
- ISIN: AEN000801011
- Industry: Financial services
- Founded: October 16, 1982; 43 years ago
- Headquarters: Fujairah, United Arab Emirates
- Key people: Saleh Bin Mohamed Bin Hamad Al Sharqi (Chairman); Adnan Anwar (CEO)
- Revenue: AED 1,2 billion (2025) (USD 326 million)
- Total assets: AED 69,4 billion (2025) (USD 19 billion)
- Number of employees: 878 (2025)
- Website: www.nbf.ae

National Bank of Fujairah (Arabic: بنك الفجيرة الوطني; NBF) is a medium-sized Emirati bank; a public joint-stock company founded in 1982 by royal decree, with operations commencing in 1984. The bank is headquartered in the Emirate of Fujairah, United Arab Emirates, and is listed on the Abu Dhabi Securities Exchange under the symbol “NBF”.

National Bank of Fujairah provides corporate banking, and personal banking services along with trade finance, treasury, cash management, precious metals and diamonds, and Islamic banking support. In 2017, the bank was the first conventional bank to join Nasdaq Dubai’s Islamic Murabaha platform for Islamic financing.

== History ==
The bank was established The bank was established on October 16, 1982, through Emiri Decree No. 7/1982 and commenced operations on September 20, 1984.

In 2006, NBF Launched its retail banking division and small-and-medium enterprise (SME) services to build a low-cost deposit base.

== Shareholding ==
The bank's shareholders' profile, as of March 31, 2026

- Department of Industry and Economy - Government of Fujairah - 50.33%
- Easa Saleh Al Gurg LLC - 18.54%
- Investment Corporation of Dubai - 7.54%
- Fujairah Investment Company - 5.04%
- Citizens of the United Arab Emirates - 18.55%

== Subsidiaries ==
The bank has 2 subsidiaries:

=== NBF Financial Services FZC ===
Established in December 2004, with limited liability status in the Fujairah Free Trade Zone, NBF Financial Services FZC provides the bank with key financial advisory and support services.

=== NBF Markets (Cayman) Ltd ===
Registered in the Cayman Islands as an exempted company limited by shares under the Companies Law (revised) of the Cayman Islands and regulated by the Cayman Island Government General Registry.

The Company was established on 31 January 2017 to provide support services to the Bank to enter into foreign exchange and derivative transactions with financial institutions / counterparties under the terms and conditions of the International Swaps and Derivatives Association (ISDA).
