= Emirates Development Bank =

Emirati government-owned bank

- Company type: Government State Owned Bank
- Traded as: Bank
- Founded: 2015; 11 years ago; Abu Dhabi.
- Founders: Sheikh Mansour bin Zayed Al Nahyan
- Headquarters: Abu Dhabi, UAE
- Website: edb.gov.ae/en/

The Emirates Development Bank (EDB) is an Emerati state-owned financial institution established in 2015 in the United Arab Emirates under the patronage of Sheikh Mansour bin Zayed Al Nahyan, Deputy PM and Minister of Presidential Affairs of UAE.

The bank supports the country's economic development and industrial development by providing financial assistance and resources to large corporates, SMEs (small and medium-sized enterprises), and startups in the UAE.

== History ==
The bank is headquartered in Abu Dhabi, with branches in Dubai.

In April 2021, the UAE government launched a new initiative to support the diversification of the nation's economy.

== Activities ==
The primary service of the Emirates Development Bank is to provide financing services to start-ups, SMEs and large corporates in the UAE that operate within the manufacturing, healthcare, food security, advanced technology and renewables sectors.

== UAE’s industrial strategy ==
The UAE's Ministry of Industry and Advanced Technology launched its industrial strategy in 2021. The 10-year comprehensive roadmap focuses on increasing the industrial sector's contribution to the country's gross domestic product from Dh133 billion in 2021 to Dh300bn in 2031.
