= Smartbond (monetary system) =

Non government-linked currency

Smartbond is a monetary system, based on a currency of the same name, which operates independently of any government institution.

The system implements economic principles including the Friedman k-percent rule (with the money supply growth rate fixed at 6%), and the avoidance of fractional-reserve banking. The rules of the Smartbond system also include a guarantee that all money supply growth is distributed as interest to currency holders, and an exchange rate floor (against USD) backed by reserves. The system uses blockchain technology to keep track of units of the Smartbond currency. This allows for its rules to be applied automatically rather than through the institutions of a sovereign state, as a traditional monetary system.

== Context ==
After the 2008 financial crisis, major economies introduced quantitative easing (US, Eurozone, Japan) and subsequently negative interest rates (Eurozone, Japan, Sweden, Switzerland). These policies of expanding the money supply and setting zero or negative interest rates have been consistent with central bank mandates for targeting inflation, given the accompanying deflationary environment. The Smartbond system in contrast follows a predetermined money supply growth, and imposes that this growth can only occur through interest earned by currency holders. As a result, there is no policy-making discretion to expand the money supply beyond its predetermined growth trajectory, or to suppress interest rates.
