= Shipa Delivery =

UAE delivery company

Shipa Delivery is a delivery company based in the United Arab Emirates (UAE). The company was founded in 2016 by Borhene Ben Mena and was launched by global logistics provider Agility.

== History ==
Upon its launch in 2016, it focused on delivering electronics, luxury items, and apparel.

In 2019 the company expanded operations to Kuwait and Saudi Arabia.

In 2020, during the COVID-19 pandemic, Shipa Delivery expanded its product line to include refrigerated items, groceries, medicines, bank cards, SIM cards, etc. In August 2021, the company opened its e-fulfilment center in Kuwait.

Shipa Delivery was named 'Last-Mile Delivery Provider of the Year' at the 'Landmarks in Logistics' Awards 2022. The same year, it received another award from Business Tabloid.

== Operations ==
Shipa Delivery is the last-mile delivery service line of the Shipa LLC platform, which also includes Shipa Freight, Shipa Ecommerce, and Shipa Mall.

The company operates in the UAE and GCC countries and provides global, US, European, Chinese, and Middle Eastern companies with cross-border fulfillment services, end-to-end logistics, and data analytics. As of 2023, company's CEO was Borhene Ben Mena.
