= John Charman =

British businessman (born 1953)

- Born: 1953 (age 72–73)
- Occupation: Businessman

John R Charman (born 1953) is an English businessman, who has made his career in insurance. He is currently CEO and chairman at Bermuda-based Endurance Specialty Insurance Ltd, which was bought by Sompo Holding (Japan ) in March 2017. He is currently the Executive Chairman of the Sompo Board of Directors.

Nicknamed "King of the London Insurance Market", Charman was described as "famously strong-willed and opinionated" by the Financial Times. Charman is ranked in the top 100 people in the global finance industry; inside the top ten richest people in the City of London; and 321st overall in the 2004 Sunday Times Rich List.

In August 2006, in what is believed to be the largest sum awarded to an English wife in a contested case, Charman was ordered by the High Court of Justice to pay his ex-wife a sum of £48 million. It beat the £30 million awarded to WPP Group chief executive Martin Sorrell's ex-wife in 2005 after their 32-year marriage ended in divorce.

== Career ==
Charman made his fortune in the 1990, during the 1991 Gulf War, offering war risk insurance on a 24-hour basis. Charman was the chief executive officer of Tarquin PLC (a joint venture company among Insurance Partners, Harvard University and the Charman Group), the parent company of the Charman Underwriting Agencies at Lloyd's of London. He was also a deputy chairman of the Council of Lloyd's and a member of the Lloyd's Core Management Group and Lloyd's Market Board between 1995 and 1997.

Charman earned the loathing of employees by banning entertainment of clients on company time and refusing to indulge in long business lunches himself. One critic claimed Charman was so intimidating that colleagues "half-expect the theme from The Godfather to greet him as he arrives at his office." In 2002 Axis settled out of court with a woman who claimed Charman barred her from a meeting, saying: "We are discussing something we decided when you were having babies."

Charman made more money when he sold Tarquin/Charman Underwriting Agencies for £350 million in 1998 to the Bermuda-based ACE International Group, receiving £70.6 million in ACE shares.

Charman was made chief executive officer at ACE Global Markets (the merger of Charman Underwriting and assets of ACE), and in January 2001 was named group president and chief executive officer of Bermuda-based ACE International Group, but left the company in March 2001 due to personal differences. He was paid £3,597,241 in lieu of notice, and £500,000 in a one-off pension contribution.

Charman immediately set up AXIS Capital, a Bermuda-based reinsurance and insurance business with offices in London, Dublin, Zurich and New York that is listed on the NYSE. The company aimed to cash in on the surge in insurance premiums after the 11 September terrorist attacks. In the financial year 2005 he was paid $7,741,762, and had stock options of $42,027,204 in Axis. Charman had informed the company that he will retire at the end of December 2008; he finally left Axis in 2012.

In May 2013 he became CEO and Chairman of Endurance Specialty Holdings, another NYSE-listed, Bermuda-based reinsurance and insurance business with offices in Bermuda, London, Singapore, Zurich, New York and other locations. He invested $30,000,000 of his private fortune in Endurance at the beginning of his tenure.

== Personal life ==
Charman met his ex-wife Beverly in 1969 at school. When they married in 1976, neither had significant resources and the couple lived initially in her parents' home, and then in his mother's home in Strood near Rochester, Kent. The couple eventually moved to Sevenoaks, where they bought a home now worth £2.75 million. The couple have two children: Nicholas (born 1981) and Michael (born 1986).

As Charman's wealth grew, the couple created the Bermuda-based Dragon Trust in 1987, which by 2006 had grown to a value of £65 million. The aim of the trust was according to Charman in his court papers agreed by the couple to preserve wealth for future generations.

After failing to secure a new house in England, in November 2003 Charman told his magistrate wife that he was taking up permanent residence in Bermuda and that their marriage was over. He has since set up home in a £2.1 million home in Bermuda, and has started a relationship with another woman, an American by the name of Lorraine Stapleton, to whom he is now married.

Charman initially offered his ex-wife their home in Sevenoaks plus £6 million cash, but Mrs Charman, who was represented by Helen Ward, of Manches, argued that the length of the marriage together with her substantial contributions did not justify such a significant departure from equality. Charman eventually offered his wife a package valued at £20 million. However, his wife still believed that the sum was not enough, and appealed the sum through the UK legal process, declaring the assets of the couple in her legal papers as:

- £52.8 million in her husband's sole name
- £5.4 million in her sole name
- £2.1 million in their joint names
- £64.6 million in the Dragon Trust

Mrs Charman also declared that a separate £25 million trust catered for the needs of their sons, and so therefore Dragon Trust was an asset under the control of Charman.

On 2 August 2006, Mr Justice Coleridge decreed in the High Court of Justice that a fair settlement would involve Charman giving his wife around 37 per cent of his assets, which would involve not only agreeing transfer of assets worth £8 million already under his wife's control, but also an additional one-off lump sum of £40 million. In his written judgement, Mr Justice Coleridge said: "The husband is genuinely bemused that the wife should regard his £20 million offer as anything other than reasonable, even generous. Her refusal to compromise on his terms has led him to deploy every available point to protect what he regards as his wealth generated entirely by his efforts. In the narrow, old-fashioned sense, that perspective is understandable, if somewhat anachronistic. Nowadays it must attract little sympathy."

Charman said: "This judgement is poor and blatantly discriminatory. By any reasonable standards this is an extraordinary decision. I made a fair and open offer to my wife of £20 million, which would be impossible for any reasonable person to spend in their lifetime." Charman later commented that he would be launching an immediate appeal, calling the High Court award "grotesque and unfair".

In review, the amount of 37% was slightly less than the wife received in White v White, the House of Lords case in 2000. That case established the principle that for long marriages the courts should begin their deliberations on how to divide marital assets from the standpoint of a 50:50 split between husband and wife, regardless of who earned the money.

Charman began selling shares in Axis on the NYSE to meet the interim legal arrangements, prior to his appeal. If required to complete full payment, then it is calculated that he will need to sell off his shares in Axis.

Charman and his representatives, Withers, mounted a high-profile media campaign, arguing that White and subsequent decisions are discriminatory towards wealthy husbands. Charman and his legal team have been widely quoted in the British press. On 9 March 2007, Mrs Charman was tied up and robbed of jewellery worth £300,000 at her home, in an incident police believe could have been motivated by the press coverage the case has attracted.

=== Court of Appeal ===
In a judgment handed down on 24 May 2007, the Court of Appeal dismissed John Charman's appeal against the award of £48 million made to his wife Beverley.

The Court reviewed the law as it stood at the end of May 2006 following the judgment of the House of Lords in the combined cases of Miller and McFarlane, interpreting and refining the guidance provided by the judgments in those cases.

The Court has provided clarity in a number of areas connected with the distribution of assets on divorce, particularly in three aspects:

- The treatment of trust assets
- Guidance on the principles which apply when redistributing wealth between parties, particularly that property should be shared in equal proportions unless there is a good reason to depart from equality
- Guidance on the concept of a special contribution which either party can be found to have made to a marriage and how that should be quantified when redistributing assets on divorce

The Court has also called for a far-reaching review and reform of the law in this area in England and Wales.

Helen Ward of Manches, who has represented Mrs Charman throughout these proceedings, said, "This is a significant judgment and brings welcome clarity to a number of important aspects of the law relating to the distribution of assets on divorce."

"The Solicitors profession will positively embrace the Court's suggestion for a broad review and reform in this area to create modern law reflecting today's modern society."

=== Statement from Beverley Charman in response to Court of Appeal judgment ===
"I acknowledge that the sum awarded to me is huge by any standards but the Court of Appeal has decided that it fairly reflects the contributions made by John and me during our twenty eight-year marriage.

The marriage ended, and divorce proceedings began nearly three years ago. The process affected the family, including the sons, whose personal lives and the marriage have been discussed publicly.

I am relieved that the appeal is over and I hope that John and I can now concentrate on building our new lives."
