= Al Ghurair Group =

Diversified conglomerate based in the UAE

- Type: Private
- Industry: Conglomerate
- Founded: 1960; 66 years ago in Dubai, United Arab Emirates
- Founder: Saif Ahmad Al Ghurair
- Headquarters: Dubai, United Arab Emirates
- Area served: UAE, GCC, MENA, Europe, Asia, Australia, North America
- Key people: Abdul Rahman Saif Al Ghurair (Chairman); Majid Saif Al Ghurair (CEO)
- Divisions: Manufacturing; Real estate Investments
- Subsidiaries: Taghleef Industries; Gulf Extrusions; Taweelah Aluminium Extrusion Company (TALEX); Al Ghurair Iron & Steel; Arabian Packaging; Arabian Flexible Packaging; Arabian Can Industries; BurJuman Centre; Al Ghurair Real Estate
- Website: www.alghurair.com

Al Ghurair Group (Arabic: مجموعة سيف الغرير), also known as Saif Al Ghurair Group, is a Dubai, United Arab Emirates–based business group founded by the Al Ghurair family. A diverse conglomerate, it has operations in the Middle East, North Africa, Europe and North America. The grandsons of Al Ghurair Group founder Ahmad Al Ghurair run the group. Abdul Rahman Saif Al Ghurair is chairman and Majid Saif Al Ghurair is the chief executive officer.

== Overview ==
=== Divisions ===
The group has three main lines of business: manufacturing, real estate, and investments. The group's manufacturing businesses include petrochemicals, aluminium and steel, and packaging.

Its petrochemical subsidiaries include Taghleef Industries and Adeka Al Ghurair Additives, a chemical additives manufacturer.

Aluminium extrusion companies Gulf Extrusions and Taweelah Aluminium Extrusion Company (TALEX), and The Royal Engineering Fabrication Company (REFCO), an aluminium fabricator for automobile parts, represent the group's aluminium businesses. Gulf Extrusions is one of the largest extrusion plants in the Gulf region.

The Al Ghurair Group's packaging businesses include Arabian Packaging, a corrugated packaging manufacturer, Arabian Flexible Packaging, and Arabian Can Industry, a manufacturer of multipurpose cans. The manufacturing division also includes Al Ghurair Iron & Steel, a cold rolling and galvanizing complex located in Mussafah. CAFU a petrol delivery app which was launched in 2018 has seen growth in the market also.

Al Ghurair Real Estate oversees the group's real estate portfolio. The group also operates shopping malls, including the BurJurman Centre and Reef Mall. The Group's financial investments include a major stake in Mashreq Bank.

=== Key people ===
Majid Saif Al Ghurair is chief executive officer of the Al Ghurair Group. He is the chairman of Drake & Scull International and the Middle East Council of Shopping Centers and a board member of Investcorp Bank BSC. He is also a member and Young Global Leader of the World Economic Forum. Majid Saif Al Ghurair graduated from Al Ain University with a bachelor's degree in accounting.

Abdul Rahman Saif Al Ghurair is the chairman of the Al Ghurair Group. He is the former chairman of the Dubai Chamber of Commerce and Industry.

== Early history (1960–1989) ==
The history of the Al Ghurair Group traces back to the 1930s when Ahmad Al Ghurair and his son Saif were pearl divers in Dubai. In 1960, as the business was successful and growing, Ahmad Al Ghurair founded the Al Ghurair Group to oversee the family's business interests. Ahmad Al Ghurair later turned the management of the family's business interests to his five sons: Saif, Abdulla, Majid, Marwan, and Jomaa. Saif became the chairman of the Al Ghurair Group, a position he held until the 1990s. The Al Ghurair Group built the United Arab Emirates' first cement factory, flour mill, and sugar refinery.

The group founded the Bank of Oman (later Mashreq Bank) in Dubai 1967. In 1969, the group bought minority owner Ottoman Bank out of its 15 percent share of the bank. The bank had assets of over DH 3,000,000,000 by 1978. It had become the largest private bank in the United Arab Emirates by the 1980s. The bank changed its name to Mashreq Bank in 1994.

The group founded Gulf Extrusions, an aluminium extrusion plant, in 1976. The plant opened in 1979. The Al Ghurair Group opened the Gulf's first shopping mall, Al Ghurair Centre, in 1981. Arabian Packaging, a producer of corrugated packaging, was founded by the group in 1982.

== Modern history (since 1990) ==
In the 1990s brothers Saif Ahmad and Abdulla Al Ghurair decided to split the Al Ghurair Group and create two complementary companies. Saif Al Ghurair retained the chairmanship of the Al Ghurair Group (now also known as Saif Al Ghurair Group). Al Ghurair Investment (also known as Abdulla Al Ghurair Group), was spun off from the Al Ghurair Group. Al Ghurair Investment, chaired by Abdulla Al Ghurair, focused on the family's finance, food, and construction businesses. The restructuring of the Al Ghurair Group was completed by 1994.

The Al Ghurair Group opened the BurJuman Centre, a luxury shopping mall, in 1991. The BurJuman was the second shopping mall to open in Dubai. It was expanded in a DH 1,400,000,000 renovation in 2004. The metro station located near BurJuman was renamed to BurJuman station in 2012.

The Al Ghurair Group founded Dubai Poly Film, a manufacturer of biaxially oriented polypropylene, in 1998. The Al Ghurair Group established Arabian Can Industry a year later in 1999. Arabian Can Industry originally made three-piece food cans and later expanded to manufacture a variety of cans for foods and both edible and industrial oils; neck-in-cans and cans with plastic handles; and can components such as lids.

The Reef Mall, a DH 220,000,000 shopping mall, opened in February 2005. The mall targeted middle income customers and is located in the Deira area of Dubai. The construction project was paid for by the Al Ghurair Group without outside funding.

Al Ghurair Iron & Steel began the construction of the United Arab Emirates' first steel cold rolling and galvanization complex in 2006. The Mussafah-based DH 300,000,000 plant opened in July 2008.

In 2006, Dubai Poly Film was merged with two other companies, AKPP and Technopack. The new company was renamed Taghleef Industries. It acquired Radici Films in 2008. Taghleef Industries also acquired United States–based Applied Extrusion Technologies in 2012. This acquisition gave the company its first North American manufacturing plant. In 2014, Taghleef Industries acquired Spanish manufacturer Derprosa Film.

In May 2011, Gulf Extrusions entered into a joint venture with Abu Dhabi Basic Industries Corporation, a subsidiary of Senaat, to create Taweelah Aluminium Extrusion Company (TALEX). TALEX was the first industrial project to be launched in Kizad. Later that year, Nippon Steel acquired a 20 percent interest in Al Ghurair Iron & Steel. The investment was used to expand Al Ghurair Iron & Steel's operations in the Middle East. Al Ghurair Petrochemicals also entered into a joint venture with Japanese plastic additive manufacturer Adeka Corporation in 2011. The joint venture was named Adeka Al Ghurair Additives.

The Royal Engineering Fabrication Company (REFCO), a wholly owned subsidiary of the Al Ghurair Group that manufactures aluminium parts for automobiles, opened a new fabrication plant in Jebel Ali in 2013. REFCO uses aluminium from the group's Gulf Extrusions subsidiary.

== See also ==
- Saif Ahmad Al Ghurair
- Emaar Group
- Majid Al Futtaim Group
- Hayel Saeed Anam Group
- Al Shirawi Enterprises Group
- Al Tayer Group
