= Terry Charman =

English historian and curator (1950–2019)

Terry Charman (29 July 1950 – 15 February 2019) was an historian and curator at the Imperial War Museum and author.

He was born at Kingston upon Thames and educated at Kingston Grammar School and then the University of Reading. After a brief career in banking he joined the Imperial War Museum as an historian. He died of cancer and joked that during his illness he had had more morphine than Hermann Goering.

== Selected publications ==
- The German Home Front 1939–45 (1989)
- Outbreak: The World Goes to War (2010)
- The First World War on the Home Front (2014)
