= Ureed =

Business services company

- Company type: Privately held company
- Founded: 2017; 9 years ago
- Founder: Nour Al Hassan
- Headquarters: Dubai, UAE
- Website: ureed.com

Ureed (Arabic: أريد, meaning I want in English) is a web-based platform that links businesses and employers with freelance workers. Its headquarters is located in Dubai, UAE.

== History ==
Ureed was founded in 2017 by Nour Al Hassan. It was operated by Tarjama, a UAE-based company founded in 2008.

In March 2019, Tarjama closed a $5m fundraising from two investors, Wamda Capital and Anova Investments as a part of an expansion plan for Ureed.

In June 2020, Ureed received a seed investment of over $1m from Wamda Capital and Anova Investments but the parties have not announced the size of the deal. The same month, Ureed announced it has spun out to become its own company led by CEO Marwan Abdelaziz, and announced its acquisition of Nabbesh, a freelance marketplace which was founded in 2012. Nabbesh's acquisition resulted in an integration of all Nabbesh's assets including the contracts and freelancers into Ureed. As a part of the expansion, Ureed developed from a linguistic content-focused platform to a general freelance marketplace offering more categories and fields.

== See also ==
- Upwork
- Fiverr
- Guru.com
- PeoplePerHour
