= Techlink =

Chain of electronics retailers in Western Asia

- Company type: Private
- Industry: Retail
- Founded: Dubai, U.A.E. (2000)
- Area served: Middle East; Asia
- Key people: Mohammed Shameer (Managing Director)
- Products: Consumer electronics
- Website: techlinksys.com

Techlink Systems LLC (stylized as Techlink) is an electronics retailing company, with its head-office in Dubai. Founded in the year 2000, the group since then has embarked on an aggressive expansion plan - which grew into a chain with several outlets across the UAE, Kuwait, Qatar, Oman, and India.

== Operations ==
As of 2014, Techlink has 22 retail outlets in the GCC countries and in India.

Country	First store	Number of stores
United Arab Emirates	2000	9
Oman	2004	9
Qatar	-	3
Kuwait	2007	1
India	2013	1

== Middle East Region's first Virtual Store ==
In February 2013, Techlink opened Middle East region's first virtual store. Mall of Emirates, one of the busiest Dubai Metro station came to life today with virtual displays of more than 500 products with their QR codes which customers can scan using the apps on their smartphones to make an order and get the products delivered right to their doorstep. Handpicked products from major brands like Acer, Apple, Dell, HP, Kaspersky, Lenovo, Norton, Prestigio, Samsung, Toshiba, and many more were made available.

== Awards ==
Department of Economic Development in Dubai (DED), announced in the year 2013 ‘Dubai SME 100’ rankings which lists the top SME companies at a ceremony held at the Dubai World Trade Centre. Mohamed Shameer, Managing Director represented Techlink Systems and received the award from Sheikh Majid bin Mohammed bin Rashid Al Maktoum, Chairman of the Dubai Culture and Arts Authority.
