= Abu Dhabi National Insurance Company =

Abu Dhabi composite insurance company

Abu Dhabi National Insurance Company (ADNIC)
- Company type: Public
- Traded as: ADX: ADNIC
- Industry: Insurance
- Founded: 10 September 1972
- Headquarters: Abu Dhabi, United Arab Emirates
- Area served: Worldwide
- Key people: Shaikh Mohammed bin Saif al Nahyan (Chairman); Tahnoon Al-Nahyan (Vice Chairman); Charalampos Mylonas (CEO)
- Revenue: ▲AED 7.18 billion (2024)
- Net income: ▲AED 419.5 million (2024)
- Total assets: ▲AED 11.80 billion (2024)
- Total equity: ▲AED 3.52 billion (2024)
- Website: www.adnic.ae

Abu Dhabi National Insurance Company PJSC (Arabic: شركة أبوظبي الوطنية التأمين; ADNIC) is a composite insurer headquartered in Abu Dhabi in the United Arab Emirates. ADNIC is the second largest insurer in the UAE by premium and one of the largest in the Gulf Cooperation Council (GCC).

The company is listed on the Abu Dhabi Stock Exchange and trades under the symbol and Bloomberg ticker ADNIC.

== History ==
ADNIC was established by Emiree Decree on 10 September 1972 and was the first insurer to be licensed in the Emirate of Abu Dhabi. The company has expanded over the years and now provides a full suite of insurance and reinsurance products within the UAE, GCC and other countries in Asia and Europe.

== Operations ==
ADNIC has operations across all emirates in the United Arab Emirates consisting of a network of branches, as well as sales and customer service centres. The insurer provides risk coverage in more than 75 countries through its international division operating from Dubai as well as a representative office in London.

ADNIC maintains a strong physical presence across the United Arab Emirates, with strategically located branches in Abu Dhabi, Dubai, Sharjah, and Al Ain to serve a diverse customer base efficiently. In addition to its local footprint, ADNIC operates an international representative office in London, further strengthening its global reach and enabling the company to serve international clients and partners across Europe and beyond.

=== Partnerships and acquisitions ===
ADNIC partners with regional and international brokers and has a global network of partnerships with global insurance and reinsurance companies.

The largest shareholder in ADNIC is Mamoura Diversified Global Holding Company PJSC (24.77%), which is the sovereign wealth fund of the emirate of Abu Dhabi.

In 2024, ADNIC acquired Allianz Saudi Fransi Cooperative Insurance Company, subsequently rebranded as Mutakamela Insurance Company. This acquisition expanded ADNIC’s market presence significantly in Saudi Arabia, further solidifying its position within the Gulf Cooperation Council (GCC) region.

=== Financial year report ===
In the financial year ended 31 December 2024, ADNIC reported total insurance revenues of AED 7.18 billion and a Net Profit after Tax of AED 419.5 million. Net profit before tax for the year ended 2024 was AED 466.4 million which represents an increase of 16.3% compared to 2023.

== Corporate Social Responsibility ==
ADNIC engages with all stakeholders through its various initiatives focused on health and wellbeing, climate change and giving back to the local community. The company has partnerships with several CSR initiatives, and is a partner of Emirates Nature-WWF, where it contributes to local conservation projects and supports the UAE to achieve its net zero goals.

In 2020, ADNIC partnered with the Social Investment Fund, administered by the Authority of Social Contribution - Ma’an, to support the UAE community during its fight against the pandemic.

In 2022, the company also contributed to Ma’an to support the Abu Dhabi community in social challenges including physical and mental health, education, skill development, family and community causes.

== Ratings ==
ADNIC’s rating by credit rating agencies are:

- A.M. Best: Financial strength rating of “A” (Excellent) and long-term issuer credit rating of "A" (Excellent), reaffirmed in 2022
- S&P: ‘A’ rating equivalent to strong with a stable outlook, reaffirmed in 2024

== Awards ==
Year of award	Name of Award	Awarding organization
2022	General Insurance of the year	Middle East Insurance Industry Awards (MEII)
2022	• Best Industry Call Centre (Insurance) • Best Call Centre (Operational/ Across Industries) • Call Centre Manager of the year (Small)	INSIGHTS Middle East Call Centre & CX Awards 2022
2022	• PeopleFirst Best HR team • Technology Deployment in Recruitment	PeopleFirst HR Excellence Awards
2022	Excellence in INSURTECH	FINNOVEX Awards
2022	General Insurer of the year	InsurTek Golden Shield Excellence Awards

== See also ==
- Abu Dhabi Securities Exchange
- Healthcare in the United Arab Emirates
