= ADCB =

Emirati bank

- Native name: بنك أبوظبي التجاري
- Type: Public bank
- Traded as: ADX: ADCB
- ISIN: AEA000201011
- Industry: Banking
- Founded: 1985; 41 years ago
- Headquarters: Abu Dhabi, United Arab Emirates
- Number of locations: 71 (2025)
- Area served: United Arab Emirates and Egypt
- Key people: Khaldoon Khalifa Al Mubarak (Chairman); Hussain Al Nowais (Vice Chairman); Ala'a Eraiqat (CEO)
- Products: Financial services
- Revenue: AED 11,4 billion (2025) (USD 3 billion)
- Operating income: AED 22,2 billion (2025) (USD 6 billion)
- Total assets: AED 773 billion (2025) (USD 210 billion)
- Total equity: AED 88,7 billion (2025) (USD 24 billion)
- Owner: Government of Abu Dhabi (through the Abu Dhabi Investment Authority (ADIA)) (65%)
- Number of employees: 9100 (2025)
- Website: www.adcb.com

ADCB (Abu Dhabi Commercial Bank), (Arabic: بنك أبوظبي التجاري); is a major Emirati bank among the Big four banks.

== History ==
Abu Dhabi Commercial Bank (ADCB) was formed in 1985 as a public shareholding company with limited liability, following the mergers between Emirates Commercial Bank, Federal Commercial Bank, and Khaleej Commercial Bank, which was established in 1975.

The Government of Abu Dhabi through the Abu Dhabi Investment Council (ADIC) holds 62.52% of ADCB shares; the remainder is held by other institutions and individuals. ADCB is the third-largest bank in the UAE in terms of balance sheet size and offers a range of commercial and retail banking services to its customers.

As of 30 September 2018, it employs over 5000 people serving retail and corporate clients. Aside from 56 branches in the UAE, it had 1 branch in Jersey until October 2020. It also operated out of representative offices in Singapore and London until these closed in 2020

In January 2019, a 3 bank merger was announced between ADCB, Union National Bank and Al Hilal Bank. The combined bank continues to operate as ADCB although Al Hilal Bank operates as a standalone Islamic bank consolidated under the new group entity.

ADCB Group will become the fifth largest bank in the region with approximately 1 million customers.

ADCB was ranked eighth on Forbes Middle East's 30 Most Valuable Banks 2025 list. It also ranked tenth on Forbes Middle East's Top 100 Listed Companies 2025 list.

== International Operations ==
The bank operates as a Wholesale banking in Saudi Arabia and India

- Egypt: The bank established in 2020. following the acquisition and rebranding of Union National Bank.

== Area of Business ==
The Bank is a United Arab Emirates-based public joint stock company that provides retail, commercial, investment, merchant, brokerage and fund management activities through its network of 56 branches in the United Arab Emirates, 46 in Egypt, 2 in India, 1 in Saudi Arabia and 1 in the UK.

== See also ==
- List of banks in United Arab Emirates
