= Emirates NBD =

Emirati bank

- Emirates NBD headquarters in Deira, Dubai.
- Type: Public bank
- Traded as: DFM: ENBD
- ISIN: AEE000801010
- Industry: Financial services Insurance
- Founded: 19 June 1963; 63 years ago
- Headquarters: Deira, Dubai, United Arab Emirates
- Number of locations: 787 (2025)
- Key people: Ahmed bin Saeed Al Maktoum (Chairman); Shayne Nelson (CEO)
- Revenue: AED 24 billion (US$6.54 billion) (2025)
- Total assets: AED 1.16 trillion (US$317.17 billion) (2025)
- Number of employees: 35 000 (2025)
- Parent: Investment Corporation of Dubai
- Website: www.emiratesnbd.com

Emirates NBD Bank PJSC, (Arabic: بنك الإمارات دبي الوطني) is a major Emirati bank among the Big Four banks.

== History ==
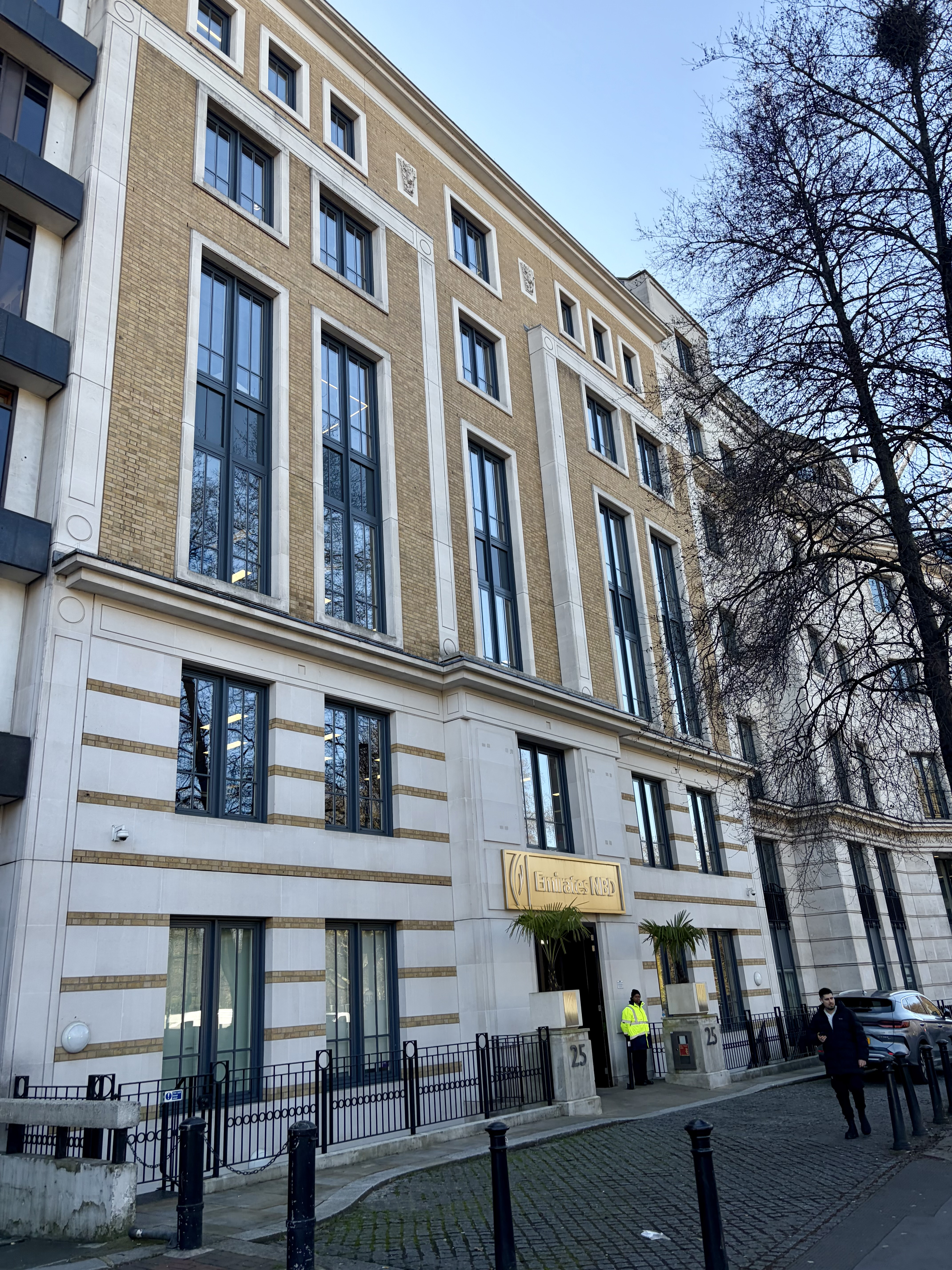
Emirates NBD building on Knightsbridge, London

Emirates NBD was initially formed as the National Bank of Dubai (NBD) on 19 June 1963 by the Emir of Dubai Sheikh Rashid bin Saeed Al Maktoum, forming the first national bank established in the country. NBD merged with Emirates Bank International (EBI) in March 2007 to form Emirates NBD. On 16 October 2007, the shares of Emirates NBD were officially listed on the Dubai Financial Market (DFM).

On 1 December 2012 Dubai Bank was acquired by Emirates NBD.

On October 7, 2022, Emirates NBD Bank PJSC sold 86,316,964 ordinary shares of BankIslami Pakistan to JS Bank.

It has been widely reported that the bank is in the race with Sumitomo Mitsui Banking Corporation to acquire a majority stake in Yes Bank.

Emirates NBD was ranked sixth on Forbes Middle East's 30 Most Valuable Banks 2025 list. It also ranked sixth on Forbes Middle East's Top 100 Listed Companies 2025 list.

== International operations ==
- Egypt: In 2013, the bank acquired all assets of BNP Paribas in Egypt. As of 2024 it is a medium rage bank, it operates 69 branches nationwide, and managed nearly USD 5 billions in total assets.
- India: In 2021, Emirates NBD has announced its plans for further expansion in India, following approval from the Reserve Bank of India (RBI) to open two additional branches in Gurugram and Chennai to cater to the northern and southern markets of India. On 18 October 2025, Emirates NBD announced that it will acquire a 60% stake in RBL Bank for ₹26,850 crore (US$3.05 billion) through a preferential issue of shares. In June 2026, it completed the acquisition for US$2.75 billion. On October 2026, the Reserve Bank of India (RBI) approved the merger of Emirates NBD Bank’s three Indian branches in Mumbai, Chennai and Gurugram with RBL Bank, effective 1 December 2026.
- Turkey: In 2018, Emirates NBD agreed to buy DenizBank from Sberbank. The deal was completed in July 2019. As of 2025, is one of the top 10 banks in Turkey.
- Saudi Arabia: In 2004, was the first UAE-based bank to be granted a license to operate in the Kingdom. As of 2026 it operates 20 branches.

== See also ==
- Islamic banking
- Noor Bank
- List of banks in the United Arab Emirates
- Emirates Development Bank
