= Dubai Financial Market =

Stock exchange located in Dubai, United Arab Emirates

Dubai Financial Market (DFM)
- Type: Stock exchange
- Location: Dubai, United Arab Emirates
- Founded: 26 March 2000; 26 years ago
- Key people: H.E. Helal Saeed Al Marri (Chairperson)
- Currency: United Arab Emirates dirham
- No. of listings: 178
- Market cap: US$244.16 billion (Mar 2025)
- Website: www.dfm.ae

The Dubai Financial Market (DFM; Arabic: سوق دبي المالي) is a stock exchange located in Dubai, United Arab Emirates. It was founded on 26 March 2000.

At the end of March 2025, the market capitalization of the Dubai Financial Market listed companies reached 897 billion AED (244 billion US$).

== Overview ==
As of 2025, there are 69 companies listed on DFM.

During 2004 and 2005, there were significant increases in the volume of shares traded and the share prices of many companies. However, towards the end of 2005 and through the first few months of 2006 the bubble burst and share values dropped by around 60% on DFM, along with similar decreases in most other Persian Gulf stock markets.

DFM is one of three stock exchanges in the UAE. Abu Dhabi Securities Exchange (ADX) also lists mostly UAE companies and NASDAQ Dubai was set up to trade international stocks.

DFM and ADX are both governed and regulated by the Capital Market Authority (CMA). CMA has the authority to impose laws and standards in which DFM and ADX have to comply with. CMA's role is to ensure that the laws are followed by the exchanges as well as to protect investors’, brokers’ and listed companies’ rights.

On the other hand, NASDAQ Dubai is governed to international standards by an independent regulator called the Dubai Financial Services Authority (DFSA), which is equivalent to the Securities and Exchange Commission in the United States. Unlike DFM and ADX, NASDAQ Dubai, located in Dubai International Financial Centre (DIFC), is an electronic exchange with no trading floor.

DFM was fully owned by the Government of Dubai until November 2006 when it turned into a public joint-stock company through an IPO, which led to sell 20% of its shares to the public and 80% were subscribed by Borse Dubai, which is owned by Dubai government. DFM's IPO has been oversubscribed by 118 times.

Like the revenue, DFM's net profit dropped sharply from the period ended 2007 till 2011. In 2007, DFM profits reached AED 1,439.6 million including none operational profits coming from IPO of AED 468 million. In 2008, profits were AED 605 million. The next year, in 2009, the profit dropped even further and reached 346.62. In 2010, another drop took place and profits reached AED 79 million. In 2011, DFM recorded a loss of AED 6.45 million. From the trend, one can imply that the situation is not improving, but is deteriorating year after year. DFM BOD members, executives, and managers are working hard to get out DFM from this unforeseen dilemma. Due to the consistent efforts of the DFM BOD members and management team, DFM was able to turn over the situation in 2013 and gain a +608.5% growth in net profits, to become AED 285 million from the AED 35 million in the previous year. and the following year the market have occurred profits of AED 759 million with a growth rate of 166.3%. The next three years the market saw a sharp decline in profit to hit AED 233.5 million in 2017.

== Listed companies ==
=== Banks ===
Company title	Symbol
Ajman Bank	AJMANBANK
Al Salam Bank – Bahrain (B.S.C.)	SALAM_BAH
Al Salam Sudan Bank	ALSALAMSUDAN
Amlak Finance	AMLAK
Commercial Bank of Dubai	CBD
Dubai Islamic Bank	DIB
Emirates Islamic Bank	EIB
Emirates Investment Bank	EIBANK
Emirates NBD	EMIRATESNBD
Gulf Finance House	GFH
Mashreqbank	MASQ

Emirates Bank International (EBI) and National Bank of Dubai (NBD) had been merged to form a holding company to run both entities named Emirates National Bank of Dubai (ENBD), this merger resulted in cancelling both shares and issuing a new one listed on the October 16, 2007.

Both AMLAK and TAMWEEL were suspended from trading since the November 23, 2008 as they announced a merger action.

=== Investment and financial services ===
Company title	Symbol
Al Ansari Financial Services	ALANSARI
Al Madina for Finance and Investment Company	ALMADINA
Al Salam Group Holding	ALSALAMKW
Dubai Financial Market	DFM
Dubai Investments	DIC
Ekttitab Holding Company	EKTTITAB
Gulf General Investments Company	GGICO
International Financial Advisors	IFA
SHUAA Capital	SHUAA

=== Insurance ===
Company title	Symbol
Alliance Insurance	ALLIANCE
Al Sagr National Insurance Company	ASNIC
Arab Insurance Group	ARIG
Arabian Scandinavian Insurance	ASCANA
Dubai Insurance Company	DIN
Dubai Islamic Insurance and Reinsurance Company	AMAN
Dubai National Insurance and Reinsurance	DNIR
Islamic Arab Insurance Company	SALAMA
National General Insurance Company	NGI
Oman Insurance Company	OIC
ORIENT Insurance	ORIENT
Takaful Emarat	TAKAFUL-EM
Takaful House	DARTAKAFUL

As of July 27, 2009, the trading symbol for the Islamic Arab Insurance company (IAIC) will be changed into SALAMA.

=== Real estate and construction ===
Company title	Symbol
Al Mazaya Holding Company	MAZAYA
Alec Holdings PJSC	ALEC
Arabtec Holding	ARTC
Deyaar Development	DEYAAR
Drake & Scull International	DSI
Dubai Development Company	DDC
Emaar Malls Group	EMAARMALLS
Emaar Properties	EMAAR
FIDU PROPERTIES	FIDU
Union Properties	UPP

=== Transportation ===
Company title	Symbol
Agility Logistics	AGLTY
Air Arabia	AIRARABIA
Aramex	ARMX
Gulf Navigation Holding	GULFNAV

=== Industrials ===
Company title	Symbol
National Cement Company	NCC
National Industries Group Holding	NIND
SALIK COMPANY PJSC	SALIK

=== Consumer staples ===
Company title	Symbol
Dubai Refreshments Company	DRC
Emirates Refreshments Company	ERC
Gulfa Mineral Water and Processing Industries	GULFA
LULU Retail Holdings PLC	LULU
Marka	MARKA
United Foods Company	UFC
United Kaipara Dairies Company	UNIKAI

=== Telecommunications ===
Company title	Symbol
Emirates Integrated Telecommunications Company	DU
Hits Telecom Holding	HITSTELEC

=== Services ===
Company title	Symbol
Burojozon Realestate brokerage LLc	Burojozon
smart investment properties Company	

Also, those securities listed on NASDAQ Dubai are included on the exchange.

== See also ==
- List of company registers
