= Al Ghurair =

Diversified family business group of UAE

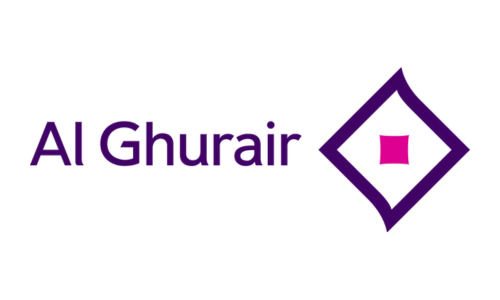
- Type: Diversified Conglomerate
- Industry: Foods, Resources, Properties, Construction, Energy, Retail, Education
- Founded: 1960
- Headquarters: Dubai, UAE - Al Ghurair, PO Box #6999 Deira, Dubai, UAE (Head office / Registered office)
- Key people: Abdul Aziz Al Ghurair (Chairman), Rashid Abdulla Al Ghurair (Board Member), Ibrahim Abdulla Al Ghurair (Board Member), John Iossifidis (GCEO)
- Number of employees: ≈28,000
- Website: http://al-ghurair.com/

Al Ghurair (Arabic: الغرير) was established in 1960. Al Ghurair is one of the largest diversified family business groups in the Middle East, with six key business units: Foods, Resources, Properties, Construction, Mobility and Ventures, including Auto Servicing & Trading, Retail and Education (Dar Al Marefa).

== Foods ==
Al Ghurair Foods was established in 1976 through the creation of National Flour Mills. The entity focuses on a diversified portfolio of food products. In 2011 Al Ghurair Foods had a market presence in 20 countries over 4 continents. Jenan is Al Ghurair Foods' principal brand offering products that include flour, pasta, edible oils, animal nutrition, fibers & livestock feeds, mono-gastric feeds and premixes. In 2010 plans were announced to open a new factory in Jebel Ali, Dubai to explore export opportunities primarily in Indonesia and Japan.

== Resources ==
Al Ghurair Resources International provides manufacturers and traders in the Food and Biofuel industries with their agricultural raw material requirement such as:

- Grain – wheat, maize, rice, pulses, and barley
- Protein – soybean meal, canola meal and soybean hulls
- Oil – crude and refined canola oil, soya bean oil, sunflower oil, corn oil and refined palm oils
- Pulses – Bulk Pulses (Yellow Chick Peas Split, Red Lentils) & Packed Pulses (Red Lentils, Red Kidney Beans, White Kidney Beans & Chick Peas Split)
- Fiber – bran, oaten hay, and alfalfa.

== Construction ==
Al Ghurair Construction was founded in the 60's and focuses on aluminium, foundations, masonry and readymix. Projects associated with this entity include Burj Khalifa, Fairmont Hotel, Emirates Towers, BurJuman, Dubai Metro, Etisalat, Kempinski Hotel and Dubai Roads and Transport Authority.

== Properties ==
Al Ghurair Properties focuses on mixed use, commercial, hospitality and residential real estate projects. Al Ghurair Centre, a development consisting of shopping, residential and commercial markets is a project associated with the group. The commercial properties division focuses on offices, warehouse and factory facilities. Retail Initiative develops and manages retail properties and the hospitality portfolio, including both hotel and apartment properties.

== Mobility ==
Cars Taxi, the largest taxi fleet provider in Dubai, is part of Al Ghurair's mobility sector. Badr Al Ghurair is the Chief Executive Officer of Cars Taxi. In his role, Badr oversees the ongoing operations of all divisions. Cars Taxi was the first taxi company in the UAE to incorporate hybrid taxis into their fleet. Badr Al Ghurair is the son of Abdulla bin Ahmad Al Ghurair, the founder and chairman of Mashreqbank, an Emirati bank.

== Ventures ==
Al Ghurair Printing & Publishing was established in 1978 and focuses on printing and publishing. The services include designing, prepress, production, binding & finishing, quality control and logistics.

== Retail ==
Al Ghurair Retail LLC operates 60 stores in 3 countries for the brands Springfield and THEFACESHOP. The retail distribution and warehousing facility is located in Dubai.

== Auto ==
AG Auto functions through a network of offices in UAE and Saudi Arabia.

Al Ghurair Auto is the exclusive distributor of Chinese automaker EXEED Automobile Company (EXEED) in UAE.

== Education ==
Dar Al Marefa and Al Ghurair University are educational institutions associated with the group. Dar Al Marefa is a school based in Dubai. The school provides a bilingual curriculum with the syllabi covering social, physical and academic development. Al Ghurair University (AGU), based in Dubai, was a private higher educational institution that focused on accredited bachelor degree programmes for students. AGU closed its doors in 2022.
