= Abu Dhabi Securities Exchange =

Stock exchange in the UAE

Abu Dhabi Securities Exchange (ADX)
- سوق أبوظبي للأوراق المالية
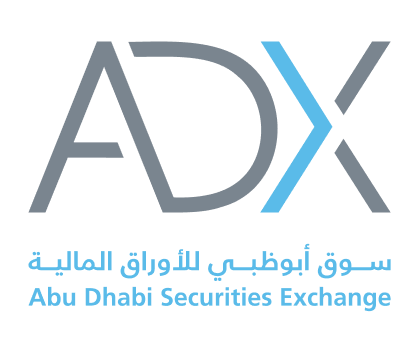
- Type: Stock Exchange
- Location: Abu Dhabi, United Arab Emirates
- Coordinates: 24.48504°N 54.35075°E
- Founded: November 15, 2000; 25 years ago
- Owner: Abu Dhabi Developmental Holding Company
- Key people: Abdulla Salem Alnuaimi (CEO)
- Currency: United Arab Emirates dirham
- No. of listings: 154 (Oct. 9, 2025)
- Market cap: AED 3.13 trillion (Oct. 9, 2025) (USD 854 billion)
- Volume: 116 billion shares (During 2023)
- Indices: 15 FTSE ADX Indices
- Website: www.adx.ae

Abu Dhabi Securities Exchange (ADX; Arabic: سوق أبو ظبي للأوراق المالية) is a stock exchange in Abu Dhabi, United Arab Emirates (UAE).

== History ==
It was established in November 2000 via Local Law No. (3). In January 2003, it was launched the ADX General Index.

On March 17, 2020. According to Local Law No. (8), ADX transitioned from a public entity into a Public Joint Stock Company (PJSC). It became a subsidiary of ADQ.

In January 2022, it transitioned to FTSE Russell's methodology, after which a newly branded index and sector groupings were introduced.

=== Impact of the 2026 Iran–United States conflict ===
Following the outbreak of the Iran conflict in March 2026, the ADX fell by approximately 9%, according to an Al Jazeera report.

== Type of Security Breakdown ==
Type of Security	Number of Securities Listed
Main Market - Listed Companies	90
Growth Market - Listed Companies	15
ETFs	17
Derivatives	32
Total	154 Securities

== Public Listed companies by sector ==
101 Public Listed Companies (as of 22nd Nov 2024) in 12 sectors, as detailed below.

=== Financial Sector ===
- ADCB: Abu Dhabi Commercial Bank
- IHC: International Holding Company PJSC
- EIC: Emirates Insurance Company
- GIH: Gulf Investment House Company
- UNION: Union Insurance Company
- CBI: Commercial Bank International
- FH: Finance House
- HH: HILY HOLDING PJSC
- WAHA: Waha Capital Company
- RAKNIC: Ras Al Khaima National Insurance Company
- UAB: United Arab Bank
- FIDELITYUNITED: United Fidelity Insurance Company (P.S.C)
- DHAFRA: Al Dhafra Insurance Company
- HAYAH: Hayah Insurance Company P.J.S.C
- IH: Insurance House
- OEIHC: Oman & Emirates Investment Holding Co
- INVESTB: Invest Bank
- NBF: National Bank of Fujairah
- ADIB: Abu Dhabi Islamic Bank
- AKIC: Al Khazna Insurance Company
- GFH: GFH Financial Group B.S.C
- FAB: First Abu Dhabi Bank
- RAKBANK: The National Bank of Ras Al Khaimah
- TKFL: Abu Dhabi National Takaful Company
- AWNIC: Al Wathba National Insurance Company
- MULTIPLY: Multiply Group PJSC
- SICO: Sharjah Insurance Company
- AFNIC: Al Fujairah National Insurance Company
- BOS: Bank of Sharjah
- AAAIC: Al-Ain Ahlia Insurance Company
- NBQ: National Bank of Umm Al Qawain
- SIB: Sharjah Islamic Bank
- ABNIC: Al Buhaira National Insurance Company
- ADNIC: Abu Dhabi National Insurance Company
- ICAP: Investcorp Capital PLC
- METHAQ: Methaq Takaful Insurance Co.
- QIC: Umm Al Qaiwain General Investment Co. P.S.C

=== Energy Sector ===
- ADNOCDRILL: ADNOC Drilling
- ADNOCDIST: ADNOC
- TAQA: TAQA

=== Insurance Sector ===
- AAAIC: Al-Ain Ahlia Insurance Company
- ABNIC: Al Buhaira National Insurance Company
- ADNIC: Abu Dhabi National Insurance Company
- AKIC: Al Khazna Insurance Company
- AWNIC: Al Wathba National Insurance Company
- DHAFRA: Al Dhafra Insurance Company
- EIC: Emirates Insurance Company
- FNI: Al Fujairah National Insurance Company
- GCIC: Green Crescent Insurance Company (GCC)
- RAKNIC: Ras Al Khaima National Insurance Company
- SICO: Sharjah Insurance Company
- TKFL: Abu Dhabi National Takaful Company
- UIC: United Insurance Company
- UNION: Union Insurance Company
- METHAQ: Methaq Takaful Insurance Co.
- WATANIA: National Takaful Company (Watania)

=== Services Sector ===
- AABAR: Aabar Petroleum Investments Company
- ADAVIATION: Abu Dhabi Aviation Company
- ALDAR: AL DAR properties
- ASMAK: International Fish Farming Company
- DRIVE: Emirates Driving Company
- ETISALAT: Emirates Telecommunications Company
- FTC: Fujairah Trading Centre
- GMPC: Gulf Medical Projects Company
- LIVESTOCK: LIVESTOCK Company Gulf
- NMDC: National Marine Dredging Company
- OEIHC: Oman & Emirates Investment Holding Company
- OILC: Oasis International Leasing Company
- PALTEL: Palestine Telecommunications Company
- QTEL: Qatar Telecommunications
- RAKPROP: Ras Al Khaima Properties Company
- SOROUH: Sorouh Real Estate
- SUDATEL: Sudan Telecommunications Company Limited

=== Industry & Hotels Sector ===
- ADNH: Abu Dhabi National Hotels Company
- ADSB: Abu Dhabi Ship Building Company
- AGTHIA: Emirates Food Stuff & Mineral Water Company
- ARKAN: Arkan Building Materials Company
- BILDCO: Abu Dhabi National Company for Building Materials
- DANA: Dana Gas
- FBICO: Fujirah Building Industries
- FCI: Fujirah Cement Industries Company
- FOODCO: Foodco Holding
- GCEM: Gulf Cement Company
- JULPHAR: Gulf Pharmaceutical Industries
- NCTH: National Corporation of Tourism
- QCEM: Umm Al Qaiwain Cement Industries Company
- RAKCC: Ras Al Khaimah Cement Company
- RAKCEC: Ras Al Khaimah Ceramics
- RAKWCT: Ras Al Khaimah Company for White Cement & Construction Materials
- RAPCO: Ras Al Khaimah Poultry & Feed Company
- SCIDC: Sharjah Cement & Industrial development Company
- TAQA: Abu Dhabi National Energy Company
- UCC: Union Cement Company

== Private Listed companies by sector ==
14 Private Listed Companies as of 26 January 2024

- TNI: The National Investor PRJSC
- INVICTUS: Invictus Investment Company PLC
- SAWAEED: Sawaeed Holding P.J.S.C
- GHITHA: GHITHA HOLDING P.J.S.C.
- FNF: FOODCO NATIONAL FOODSTUFF PrJSC
- MANAZEL: Manazel PJSC
- ANAN: ANAN INVESTMENT HOLDING P.J.S.C
- MODON: MODON HOLDING PSC
- EASYLEASE: Easy Lease Motorcycle Rental PJSC
- ASM: Al Seer Marine Supplies & Equipment
- ESG: ESG EMIRATES STALLIONS GROUP P.J.S.C
- RPM: Response Plus Holding PrJSC
- PALMS: PALMS SPORTS PrJSC
- MBME: MBME GROUP Private Joint Stock Company

== See also ==
- Dubai Financial Market
- Nasdaq Dubai
