= Commercial Bank of Dubai =

Emirati bank

- Headquarters of the bank
- Native name: بنك دبي التجاري
- Type: Public bank
- Traded as: DFM: CBD
- Industry: Banking
- Founded: July 3, 1969; 57 years ago
- Founder: Sheikh Rashid bin Saeed Al Maktoum
- Headquarters: Dubai, United Arab Emirates
- Number of locations: 15 (2025)
- Area served: United Arab Emirates
- Key people: Ahmad Abdulkarim Julfar (Chairman); Bernd van Linder (CEO)
- Products: Financial services
- Revenue: AED 3,5 billion (2025) (USD 953 million)
- Operating income: AED 5,9 billion (2025) (USD 1,6 billion)
- Total assets: AED 160 billion (2025) (USD 43,6 billion)
- Total equity: AED 19,4 billion (2025) (USD 5,28 billion)
- Number of employees: 1149 (2025)
- Website: www.cbd.ae

Commercial Bank of Dubai (CBD) is a UAE banking and financial services corporation headquartered in Deira, Dubai. With more than US$38 billion in assets, Gulf Business listed CBD as the 7th largest bank in the UAE, based on total assets. It also figures in the Dubai Financial Market index.

== History ==
Founded in 1969, by an Amiri Decree issued by the late Rashid Bin Saeed Al Maktoum, CBD started out as a joint venture of Commerzbank, Chase Manhattan Bank and Commercial Bank of Kuwait, and evolved into a National Public shareholding company by 1982. The bank’s major shareholders include Investment Corporation of Dubai (ICD), the principal investment arm of the Dubai Government and leading UAE national conglomerates and families.

CBD provides financial services and products for Institutional, Corporate, and Business Banking, and a digital product suite to meet needs of Retail and Private banking clients.

Since 2018, the bank has adopted a digital-first strategy to enhance customer interactions across all touchpoints. Its evolving customer servicing model is focused on delivering high-value sales and service experiences while driving adoption of digital and mobile platforms. These initiatives have been spearheaded by CEO Dr. Bernd van Linder.

In 2022, CBD partnered with fintech company Postpay to provide transaction banking, debt funding, and e-commerce solutions.

In 2024, Hewlett Packard Enterprise (HPE) and Du from Emirates Integrated Telecommunications Company (EITC) announced their collaboration with CBD to integrate cutting-edge infrastructure to support its innovation roadmap.

In 2024, CBD joined the Dubai FinTech Summit (DFS)—organised by Dubai International Financial Centre (DIFC)— as a Strategic Banking Partner, highlighting its commitment to supporting the global fintech ecosystem and future-facing enterprises.

In 2025, CBD entered a multi-year partnership with Dubai Festivals and Retail Establishment (DFRE), part of Dubai’s Department of Economy & Tourism (DET). This collaboration provides CBD customers with exclusive privileges tied to Dubai’s flagship festivals, including Dubai Shopping Festival, Dubai Food Festival, Ramadan and Eid in Dubai, and Dubai Fitness Challenge. The partnership reflects CBD’s vision to actively contribute to the cultural and economic fabric of the UAE.

In 2025, CBD hosted the region’s first Microsoft Copilot Promptathon, in collaboration with the Microsoft Innovation Hub, reinforcing its role as a pioneer in AI adoption. The event marked the launch of a large-scale rollout of Microsoft Copilot to CBD employees, aligning with the UAE’s national AI strategy. Microsoft UAE lauded CBD’s leadership in AI adoption, stating that the Promptathon showcases the value of Generative AI in enhancing productivity and fostering innovation in the financial sector, and that the collaboration positions CBD at the forefront of AI-driven transformation, contributing to Dubai’s Universal Blueprint for AI.

In 2025, CBD became the first bank in the Middle East to integrate JP Morgan's blockchain powered Liink network to improve the speed, accuracy and security of cross-border payments by allowing businesses to verify account details before initiating transactions.

== Financial data ==
In 2024, CBD reported a net profit before tax of AED 3,325 million, representing a 25.5% increase from 2023. The bank's total operating income rose by 11.2% year-on-year to AED 5,491 million, while total assets increased by 8.7% to AED 140.2 billion. The Return on Equity (RoE) is 23.48% with a cost to income ratio of 25.56%.

CBD holds credit ratings of A− (Fitch).

== Awards and recognition ==
In 2022, CBD was named the number one bank in the UAE on the Forbes list of World's Best Banks 2022, published in conjunction with market research firm Statista, which surveyed more than 45,000 customers across 27 countries around the globe for their opinions on their current and former banking relationships.

In 2024, CBD received the Environmental, Social, and Governance (ESG) Label from the Dubai Chamber of Commerce, in recognition of its responsible and sustainable business practices.

In 2024, CBD won accolades for Best Anti-Money Laundering Technology Implementation and Best Mobile Banking Technology Implementation at the TAB Global Middle East Awards.

In 2024, CBD was honoured with the Best Innovation in Payments Technology award at the MEA Finance Leaders in Payments Awards, which celebrates the region's most transformative contributions to the evolving payments ecosystem.

CBD was ranked 20th on Forbes Middle East's 30 Most Valuable Banks 2025 list. It also ranked 46th on Forbes Middle Easts Top 100 Listed Companies 2025 list.
