= Al Hilal Bank =

Defunct Emirati bank

- Industry: Banking
- Founded: 2007; 19 years ago as Al Hilal Bank
- Headquarters: Abu Dhabi, UAE
- Key people: Jamal Al Awadhi (CEO)
- Website: www.alhilalbank.ae/en/personal/

Al Hilal Bank (Arabic: مصرف الهلال), established in 2007, is an Islamic bank headquartered in Abu Dhabi, UAE offering Shari’ah compliant retail banking and wealth management.

Al Hilal Bank was acquired by ADCB Group in 2019.

With issued capital of DH 4 billion and paid-up capital of DH 3.5 billion, the Bank had credit ratings of A+ and A2 by Fitch and Moody’s respectively. The Bank has 14 retail branches across the UAE and previously had 3 branches in Kazakhstan which now operate under the ADCB Islamic brand. Al Hilal Bank also offers online banking services.

== See also ==
- List of banks in United Arab Emirates
