= Mashreq (bank) =

Emirati bank

Mashreqbank PSC

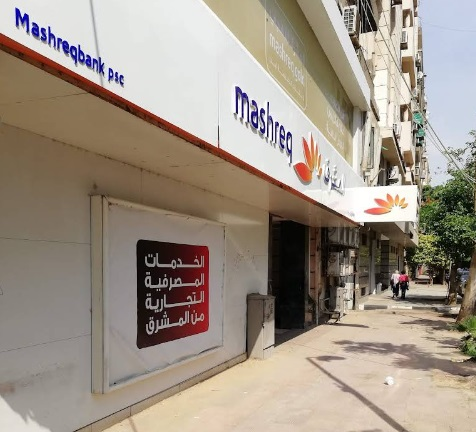
- Branch in Egypt
- Formerly: Bank of Oman (1967–1993)
- Type: Publicly traded
- Traded as: DFM: MASQ
- ISIN: AEM000101014
- Industry: Financial services; Bancassurance
- Founded: 1967; 59 years ago in Dubai
- Headquarters: Dubai, United Arab Emirates
- Key people: Abdul Aziz Al Ghurair (Chairman); Ahmed Abdelaal (CEO)
- Revenue: ▼DH 12.58 billion (2025); ▲DH 13.42 billion (2024)
- Net income: ▼DH 6.97 billion (2025); ▲DH 9.02 billion (2024)
- Total assets: ▲DH 334.63 billion (2025); ▲DH 267.45 billion (2024)
- Number of employees: 6,163 (2024)
- Parent: Al Ghurair Group
- Divisions: Titan Financial Brokers
- Website: www.mashreq.com

Mashreq (Arabic: بنك المشرق) is a major Emirati bank, one of the oldest in the country and the second in the Middle East. Established in 1967 as the Bank of Oman, the bank later rebranded as Mashreq and has since expanded its operations across multiple markets.

== Services ==
Mashreq provides a range of conventional and Islamic banking services, including personal banking solutions such as deposits, loans, and credit cards. The bank also offers corporate and investment banking services, including corporate finance, investment advisory on mergers and acquisitions, initial public offerings (IPOs), and underwriting.

Additionally, Mashreq delivers wealth and asset management services, catering to both institutional and individual clients.

Through its digital banking platform, Mashreq NEO, the bank provides UAE and Egypt residents with a suite of online banking services. The Mashreq NEO app offers functionalities such as account transactions, bill payments, reward tracking, and financial news updates.

== Global presence ==
Mashreq operates in 14 countries, employing over 6,000 professionals from 70 nationalities. The bank has corporate banking operations in Oman, Bahrain, Qatar, Kuwait, and India, and provides corporate and retail banking services in Egypt. It has also obtained a restricted license from the State Bank of Pakistan to pilot digital retail banking operations. Additionally, Mashreq is involved in foreign exchange businesses in Bangladesh, Pakistan, and Nepal. Outside the Middle East and South Asia, Mashreq maintains full-service branches in New York, London, and Hong Kong.

== Recognitions ==
In 2024, Brand Finance ranked Mashreq as the fastest-growing banking brand in the Middle East in its Banking 500 rankings. The bank was also named the Middle East's Best Digital Bank for the fifth consecutive year at the Euromoney Awards for Excellence. Additionally, The Banker's Top 1000 Global Bank Ratings recognized Mashreq as the Best Performing Bank in the UAE for the second consecutive year. The bank also received the Banking Group Brand of the Year – MENA award at the Global Banking & Finance Awards.

Mashreq was ranked 17th on Forbes Middle East's 30 Most Valuable Banks 2025 list. It also ranked 23rd on Forbes Middle East's Top 100 Listed Companies 2025 list.

== Financial Performance ==
For the year 2024, Mashreq reported a net profit before tax of AED 9.9 billion.

== Products ==
Product offerings include:

- Blockchain platform (partnership with Dubai International Financial Centre)
- Digital IPOs
- Mashreq Al Islami (sharia-compliant offerings certified by the AAOIFI)
- Mashreq Capital (investment funds)
- Mashreq Gold / Private Banking (wealth management services)
- NEO (digital banking platform)
  - NEO BIZ (business banking)
  - NEO Corp (wholesale banking)
  - NEO NXT (supervised accounts for minors)
  - NEO PLUS (Emirati banking, i.e. citizen-only products)

== See also ==
- Islamic banking and finance
