= Investment Corporation of Dubai =

Sovereign wealth fund from the United Arab Emirates

- Native name: مؤسسة دبي للاستثمارات الحكومية
- Type: Sovereign wealth fund
- Founded: 3 May 2006; 20 years ago
- Headquarters: Dubai, United Arab Emirates
- Key people: Sheikh Hamdan bin Mohammed bin Rashid al Maktoum (Crown Prince of Dubai and Chairman); Mohammed Ibrahim Al Shaibani (Managing Director and Board Member)
- Revenue: ▲AED 359 billion (2025)
- AUM: ▲AED 1,680 billion (2025)
- Owner: Government of Dubai
- Website: icd.gov.ae

The Investment Corporation of Dubai (Arabic: مؤسسة دبي للاستثمارات الحكومية, ICD) is the principal investment arm of the Government of Dubai in the United Arab Emirates. Established on 3 May 2006 by a decree of the Ruler of Dubai, it was created to consolidate and manage the government's portfolio of commercial companies and investments. At its inception, ICD was capitalized through the transfer of assets from the Department of Finance's Investment Division. Its portfolio includes holdings in sectors such as banking, transportation, oil and gas, real estate, and hospitality, both within the United Arab Emirates and internationally. As of 2025, ICD reported total assets of AED 1.68 trillion and revenues of AED 359 billion, with global presence in 83 countries across 6 continents.

== History ==
=== Formation and early years (2006–2007) ===
ICD was founded on May 3, 2006, by a decree (Law No. 11 of 2006) issued by Sheikh Mohammed bin Rashid Al Maktoum, the Ruler of Dubai. The establishment of ICD was part of a strategy to centralize the management of Dubai's wealth and commercial enterprises under one entity.

In 2007, shortly after its inception, the Government of Dubai transferred ownership of numerous major state-owned companies to ICD, forming the core of its portfolio. These transfers included majority stakes in Emirates Bank International and National Bank of Dubai (which were later merged to form Emirates NBD), the flagship airline Emirates along with its aviation services arm dnata, the energy company Emirates National Oil Company (ENOC), the aluminum producer Dubai Aluminium (Dubal), and the Dubai World Trade Centre, among others. Minority stakes in other firms such as Emaar Properties, Dubai Islamic Bank, Commercial Bank of Dubai, Dubai Ice Plant & Cold Stores Company, and Dubai Development Company were also placed under ICD's umbrella around this time. ICD also acquired Borse Dubai in 2007.

=== 2008–2015 ===
Additional government-owned entities were transferred to ICD in subsequent years. In 2009, Dubai's authorities moved Dubai Duty Free (the operator of retail operations at Dubai's airports) and key free zone authorities like Dubai Silicon Oasis and Dubai Airport Free Zone into ICD's control. Emaratech and aswaaq were also included during this period. In 2010, the national savings scheme National Bonds Corporation became a subsidiary of ICD. In 2012, ICD acquired Smartstreams Technologies Group Limited and a controlling stake in Dubai Aerospace Enterprise (DAE). In 2014, Atlantis The Palm was acquired, followed in 2015 by controlling stakes in South Korean construction firm Ssangyong Engineering and Construction, Mandarin Oriental New York, and W Washington D.C. Hotel. In 2015, ICD transferred its stake in Dubai Aluminium (DUBAL) to Emirates Global Aluminium (EGA), a joint venture between ICD and Mubadala Investment Company. ICD owns 50% stake in EGA through its wholly owned entity DUBAL Holding. Also that year, ICD took control of Flydubai and acquired 46% stake in Kerzner International Holdings, owner and operator of Atlantis, One&Only, SIRO and Rare Finds brands, while establishing Ithra Dubai, a property management and asset development subsidiary to manage strategic real estate assets.

=== 2016–2026 ===
In 2016, ICD acquired Porto Montenegro Marina and Resort located in the world heritage site Bay of Kotor from Montport Capital. In 2017, ALEC Engineering and Contracting Limited was acquired by ICD. In October 2017, ICD listed a $200 million Sukuk on NASDAQ Dubai, its second conventional bond listing following the $300 million bond listing in 2014. In addition, two Sharia-compliant bonds, one worth $1 billion and another worth $700 million, were also listed on Nasdaq Dubai in 2017 and May 2014.

In 2018, ICD acquired ISS Global Forwarding and made DAE a wholly-owned subsidiary in 2019. In 2020, the Government of Dubai transferred Dubai Multi Commodities Centre Authority to ICD. In 2020, ICD sold the W Washington D.C. Hotel to independent owners, established its ESG Management Committee, formalised its ESG Policy and Framework and commissioned the carbon footprint of its operations. In 2022, ICD disposed of its controlling stake in South Korean construction firm Ssangyong Engineering and Construction, selling shares to Global Sae-A Group in October. In 2023, ICD sold aswaaq to GMG in January and Columbus Centre Corporation (Cayman), which owns Mandarin Oriental NY Hotel to Reliance Industries.

In 2024, ICD and Brookfield Corporation sold a 49% stake in ICD Brookfield Place to Abu Dhabi-based Lunate and Saudi Arabia's Olayan Financing Company.

In October 2025, ALEC Holdings, a Dubai-based engineering and construction group wholly owned by ICD, listed 20 per cent of its shares on the Dubai Financial Market through an initial public offering that raised AED 1.4 billion. The IPO was the largest in the UAE construction sector by both valuation and size, and the first in the sector in over 15 years. ICD retained an 81.6 per cent stake in the company following the listing. ICD also increased its stake in Emirates Rawabi to 47.7%.

In May 2026, ICD transferred its entire 22.27 per cent shareholding in Emaar Properties to Emirates Power Investment, a subsidiary of Dubai Holding.

== Subsidiary activities ==
During the period of 2007–2025, ICD subsidiaries carried out various other mergers and acquisitions.

In 2007, Emirates National Bank of Dubai (ENBD) was formed through the merger of EBI and NBD, with a market capitalisation of over $11.3 Billion. In the same year, the Government of Dubai consolidated its holdings in the Dubai Financial Market and Dubai International Financial Exchange to Borse Dubai, which also acquired interest in the London Stock Exchange and Nasdaq OMX.

In 2010, dnata acquired Alpha Flight Catering Group, an in-flight caterer in the United Kingdom. The following year, dnata purchased Travel Republic Group, an online travel agency based in the UK.

In 2013, ENBD acquired the Egyptian business of French bank BNP Paribas for $500 million, while dnata also obtained a controlling stake in Servair Airchef, an in-flight catering provider in Italy.

In 2014, Emaar Malls shares were listed on the Dubai Financial Market.

In 2015, Borse Dubai sold its $2.2bn stake in the London Stock Exchange, while Emirates National Oil Company (ENOC) acquired full ownership of Dragon Oil, an exploration and production company in Turkmenistan. DAE divested its interest in American MRO provider StandardAero to New York-based private equity firm Veritas Capital.

In 2016, dnata acquired Ground Services International, a ground-handling company based in the US.

In 2017, DAE purchased Dublin-based commercial jet aircraft leasing company AWAS. Emaar Development shares were then listed on the Dubai Financial Market.

In 2017, ICD launched the Deira Enrichment Project through its subsidiary Ithra Dubai. The project aims to develop the waterfront of the Deira district and contains hotels, malls, markets as well as other real estate developments. Ithra Dubai also started constructing the One Za'abeel in 2017, which it finished in 2024. In 2024, Kerzner International also opened One&Only and SIRO hotels at the building.

In 2018, dnata acquired the catering business of Qantas Airways. In 2019, ENBD acquired full ownership of DenizBank A.Ş in Turkey. This was followed in 2020 by Emirates taking over American company Air Venture Holdings, which specialised in food and beverage retail sales.

In 2021, the federal government agency Capital Market Authority approved the Emaar Properties and Emaar Malls merger.

In 2022, Dubai Silicon Oasis Authority and Dubai Airport Free Zone Authority merged into the newly established Dubai Integrated Economic Zones Authority, DAE acquired Sky Fund I Irish Ltd and EMAAR Properties acquired the remaining stake in Dubai Creek Harbour LLC.

In 2023, hotel operations commenced at Atlantis The Royal, Dubai, dnata acquired a controlling stake in Imagine Cruising, and both Borse Dubai and ALEC became wholly owned subsidiaries of ICD. Emirates also took delivery of its first Airbus A350-900 aircraft and acquired full ownership of Emirates Bustanica, the world's largest indoor vertical farm.

In 2025, DAE acquired aircraft lessor Nordic Aviation Capital, while DIEZA acquired Axiom's telecoms distribution and DUCAB acquired National Cable Factory.

== ICD's board of directors ==
- Sheikh Hamdan bin Mohammed bin Rashid al Maktoum, Crown Prince of Dubai and Chairman of Dubai Executive Council - Chairman of ICD
- Sheikh Maktoum bin Mohammed bin Rashid Al Maktoum, First Deputy Ruler of Dubai - Vice-chairman of ICD
- Sheikh Ahmed bin Saeed Al Maktoum, Board Member
- Mohammed Ibrahim Al Shaibani, Board Member and Managing Director
- Reem bint Ebrahim Al Hashimy, Board Member
- Sultan bin Saeed Al Mansouri, Board Member
- Abdulrahman Saleh Al Saleh, Board Member
- Mohamed Hadi Al Hussaini, Board Member
- Helal Saeed Al Marri, Board Member

== Investment sectors ==
ICD maintains a diversified investment portfolio spanning both local and international markets across multiple sectors. The portfolio allocation is distributed as follows:

=== Banking & Financial Services ===
ICD holds stakes in financial institutions operating within the UAE. These include conventional banks such as Emirates NBD and Commercial Bank of Dubai, as well as Sharia-compliant entities including Dubai Islamic Bank and National Bonds Corporation. Through its ownership of Borse Dubai, ICD controls the Dubai Financial Market (DFM) and Nasdaq Dubai, and holds a substantial stake in Nasdaq Inc.

=== Transportation & Related Services ===
Reflecting Dubai's aviation-centric economy, this segment encompasses entities including the Emirates Airline, airport services provider Dnata, the Dubai-based carrier Flydubai, and aircraft leasing company Dubai Aerospace Enterprise (DAE).

=== Oil & Gas ===
ICD's primary holding in this sector is Emirates National Oil Company (ENOC), established in 1993, which operates across the upstream, midstream, and downstream segments of the oil and gas value chain.

=== Other Segments ===
This portion includes holdings across several industries:

- Industrial: Includes Emirates Global Aluminium (EGA), Dubal Holding, and Dubai Cable Company (Ducab).
- Hospitality & Leisure: Comprises assets such as Atlantis The Palm, Atlantis The Royal, One&Only Resorts (including properties in Za’abeel, Palmilla, and Cape Town), Porto Montenegro (located within a UNESCO-protected area), and Kerzner International, and Dubai World Trade Centre.
- Real Estate & Construction: Features Ithra Dubai, ALEC Engineering, the ICD Brookfield Place joint venture, and the Dubai Integrated Economic Zones Authority (DIEZ), formed in 2022.
- Retail & Other Holdings: Includes Dubai Duty Free, the Dubai Multi Commodities Centre (DMCC), SmartStream, Emaratech, Emirates Rawabi, and ISS Global.
