= Skycourts Towers =

Residential complex in Dubai, UAE

- Interactive map of the Skycourts Towers area

General information
- Status: Completed
- Type: Residential
- Location: Dubailand, Dubai, UAE
- Coordinates: 25°05′30.49″N 55°23′07.99″E
- Construction started: 2007
- Completed: 2010
- Cost: $433.37 million

Height
- Height: 86.1 m (282 ft)

Technical details
- Floor count: 21 floors in all 6 towers
- Floor area: 450,688.50 m^{2} (4,851,200 sq ft)
- Lifts/elevators: 30 (5 per tower)

Design and construction
- Architects: Lacasa Architects Lacasa Architects and Engineering Consultants, on site RE's were: Badran Jayousi, Moutaz Tala'a, Yousef Samara, while the Senior Projects Director was Mohammed Tanbouz
- Developer: National Bonds Corporation PJSC

Skycourts Towers is a project by National Bonds Corporation PJSC located within the Dubailand Residence Complex in Dubai. The AED 1.6 billion development offers 2,836 apartments across 6 towers. Dubai's Roads and Transport Authority (RTA) introduced the route between Dubai Mall Metro Station and the nearby area.

== Air Conditioning ==
Originally planned to be fulfilled by Empower, Alpha Utilities has ended up as the provider of air conditioning to the building via District cooling.

=== Controversies ===
Several residents report that air conditioning charges are unclear and unreasonably high, and have decided to take legal action against Alpha Utilities.

== See also ==
- List of development projects in Dubai
