= Mohammed Ibrahim Al Shaibani =

Director General, Government of Dubai

Mohammed Al Shaibani

Personal details
- Born: Mohammed Ibrahim Abdul Rahman Al Shaibani; 1964 (age 61–62) Dubai, Trucial States (now United Arab Emirates)
- Occupation: Government official and investment executive

Mohammed Ibrahim Al Shaibani (Arabic: محمد إبراهيم الشيباني) is an Emirati government official and investment executive. He served as director general of the Dubai Ruler's Court from 2008 until September 2026, when Abdulrahman Saleh Al Saleh was appointed acting director general in his place.

Al Shaibani is managing director and a board member of the Investment Corporation of Dubai (ICD), the principal investment arm of the Government of Dubai. He has also served as vice chairman of Dubai's Supreme Fiscal Committee and as a member of the Executive Council of Dubai.

Al Shaibani served as chairman of Dubai Islamic Bank (DIB) from 2008 until September 2026. DIB announced on 23 September 2026 that he had resigned as chairman and a member of its board, effective 20 September. He has also held positions on the boards of several government-related enterprises, including Dubai World and Dubai Aerospace Enterprise.

== Career ==
=== Early life ===
Al Shaibani has a Bachelor of Computer Science from a university in the United States. He started his career at Dubai Ports Authority and Jebel Ali Free Zone, where he worked for seven years. After that, he moved to Singapore where he spent four years as managing director of Al Khaleej Investments.

=== Government roles ===
Since 1998 Al Shaibani has held president's position with the Dubai Office, a private management entity for the Royal Family of Dubai. In this capacity, he represented the interests of the ruling family in London for eight years from 1999 to 2007. He currently oversees the functioning of this office from Dubai.

Al Shaibani is also a member of the Executive Council, Government of Dubai, which was created in 2003 to support government authorities in maintaining the stability and organization of the emirate, in addition to developing its society and economy.

Al Shaibani also serves as the vice chairman of the Supreme Fiscal Committee (SFC) of Dubai since its inception in 2007. This five-man committee supervises the Dubai Financial Support Fund. In 2008, Al Shaibani was appointed director general of The Ruler's Court, Government of Dubai, by Emiri decree issued by Sheikh Mohammed bin Rashid Al Maktoum, ruler of Dubai. On 20 September 2026, Abdulrahman Saleh Al Saleh was appointed acting director general of the Ruler's Court, succeeding Al Shaibani.

=== Business involvement ===
In 2008, Al Shaibani was appointed chairman of the Board of Directors of Dubai Islamic Bank (DIB), an Islamic bank based in Dubai. On 23 September 2026, DIB announced that he had resigned as chairman and board member, effective 20 September.DIB is also considered as the first bank in the world to apply Islamic principles in all its practices.

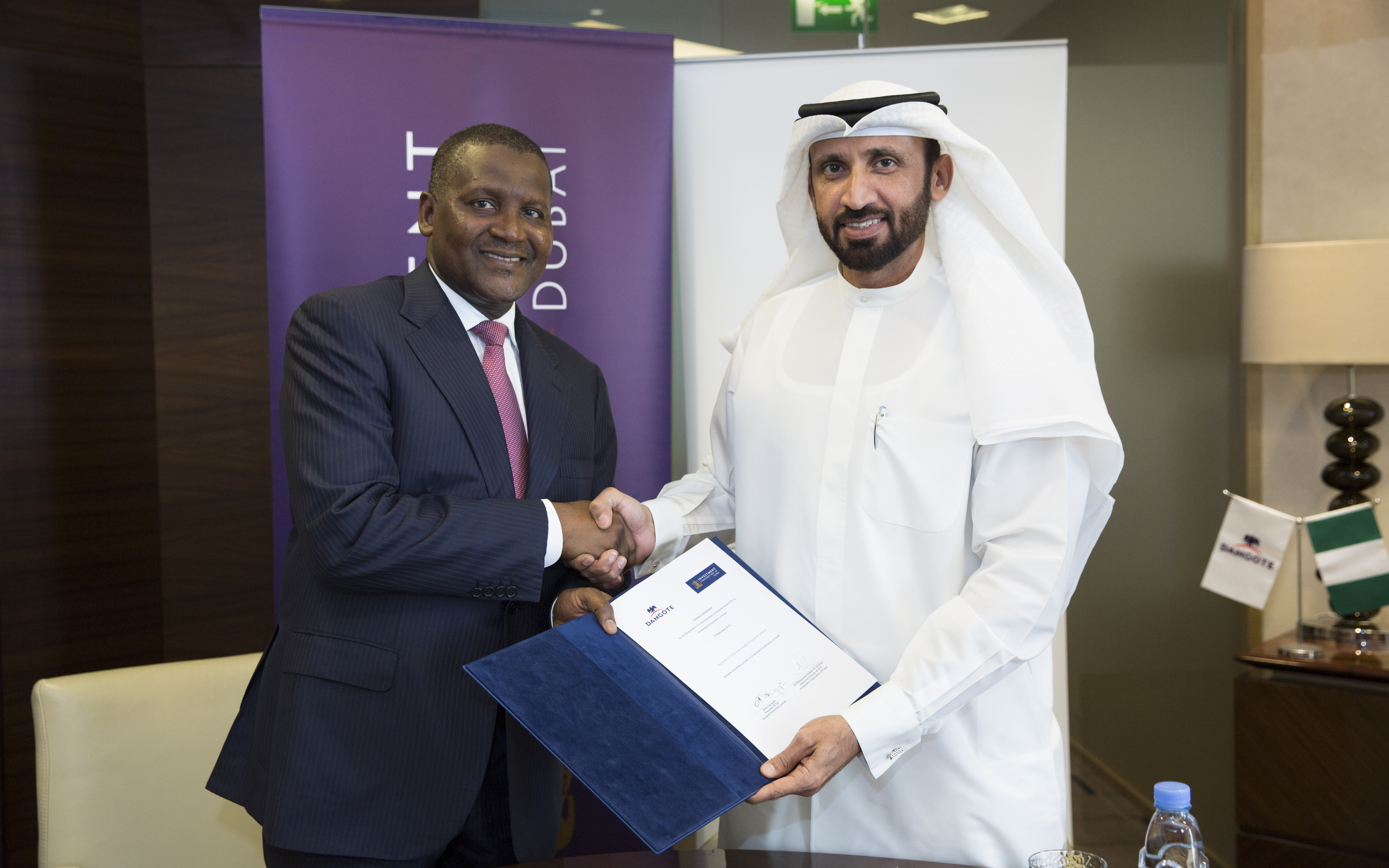
Al Shaibani signs with Aliko Dangote the acquisition of Dangote Cement by ICD in 2014.

An Emiri decree issued in 2012 reaffirmed Al Shaibani as CEO and executive director of the Investment Corporation of Dubai (ICD), the investment arm of the Government of Dubai. In 2023, Decree No. 40 of 2023 reconstituted ICD's board and appointed Al Shaibani as its managing director.

In 2010, Al Shaibani has been appointed as a member of the Board of Directors of Dubai World.

In 2013, he served as the deputy chairman of the Higher Preparatory Committee of the World Expo 2020.

After acquiring the entertainment resort Atlantis the Palm in 2013, ICD has purchased significant equity interest in the international firm that manages it, Kerzner International. This was followed by Al Shaibani replacing Sol Kerzner as the chairman of the international luxury hotels developer after the latter's retirement in April 2014.

In January 2020, he was appointed chairman of Nakheel, a property developer in Dubai that has recently been named as a member of the higher committee of real estate announced by Mohammed bin Rashid Al Maktoum, Vice President and Ruler of Dubai.

== Awards and recognition ==
He was ranked the most influential non-royal official in UAE by the Wall Street Journal in 2010 and one of the country's ten most influential people by Your Middle East platform in 2013. That year, Mohammed Al Shaibani was also considered as the sixth of the 500 most powerful Arabs in the world by Arabian Business, and he was named the 17th of the 100 most powerful Arabs in 2014 by Gulf Business. In 2020, he was ranked at 26 on Construction Week's Power 100 list for 2020. He was featured in Cityscape Intelligence's most influential people in the MENA real estate industry.

== Controversies ==
Al Shaibani has faced calls for targeted sanctions over his alleged role in the continued detention of British businessman Ryan Cornelius, who has been imprisoned in Dubai since 2008 following a dispute involving a loan from Dubai Islamic Bank (DIB). Al Shaibani was appointed chairman of DIB in March 2008, shortly before Cornelius's arrest, while also serving as director general of the Dubai Ruler's Court.

In 2022, the United Nations Working Group on Arbitrary Detention found Cornelius's detention to be arbitrary, identified serious violations of his fair-trial rights and called for his immediate release and compensation. The UN opinion recorded that the judge who originally heard the case said he could not convict Cornelius and his co-defendants on the evidence presented and called instead for further investigation of "more senior Dubai Islamic Bank executives who are not on trial".

Cornelius's original ten-year sentence was extended by a further 20 years in 2018 under Dubai Law No. 37 of 2009. The UN opinion recorded a submission that the additional detention was imposed "at the behest of Dubai Islamic Bank"; it also found that Cornelius received no prior notice, legal representation or opportunity to make submissions at the closed-door proceeding. In July 2025, the European Parliament described Cornelius's conviction as being based on "false fraud charges related to a loan from Dubai Islamic Bank", condemned his arbitrary and prolonged detention and stated that the development seized from him by DIB was, according to independent auditors, worth many times the outstanding debt claimed by the bank.

Al Shaibani has subsequently been specifically named in calls for Magnitsky sanctions in the United Kingdom. In March 2025, a cross-party group of British parliamentarians called for sanctions designations in Cornelius's case; contemporary reporting identified Al Shaibani among the DIB officials targeted by the appeal. In January 2026, former Conservative leader Sir Iain Duncan Smith again urged the government to impose targeted Magnitsky sanctions and specifically named Al Shaibani and other DIB board members.

In July 2026, seven UN human-rights experts again called for Cornelius's immediate release, saying the 20-year extension had been imposed in proceedings "marred by serious judicial irregularities". They also noted that civil proceedings in Bahrain had reportedly found that assets and payments transferred to the lender had fully discharged Cornelius's indebtedness and exceeded the amount due. In September 2026, Duncan Smith told the House of Commons that he considered Al Shaibani responsible for Cornelius's continued detention and renewed his call for sanctions against key individuals.

On 20 September 2026, Abdulrahman Saleh Al Saleh was appointed acting director general of the Dubai Ruler's Court, succeeding Al Shaibani. DIB announced three days later that Al Shaibani had also resigned as chairman and a member of its board, effective 20 September, citing personal reasons. No public evidence has established a connection between his departures and the Cornelius case.

DIB has rejected claims that it is responsible for Cornelius's imprisonment, saying that sentencing is the responsibility of the UAE's judicial system.
