= Saeed Al Nazari =

Emirati government official

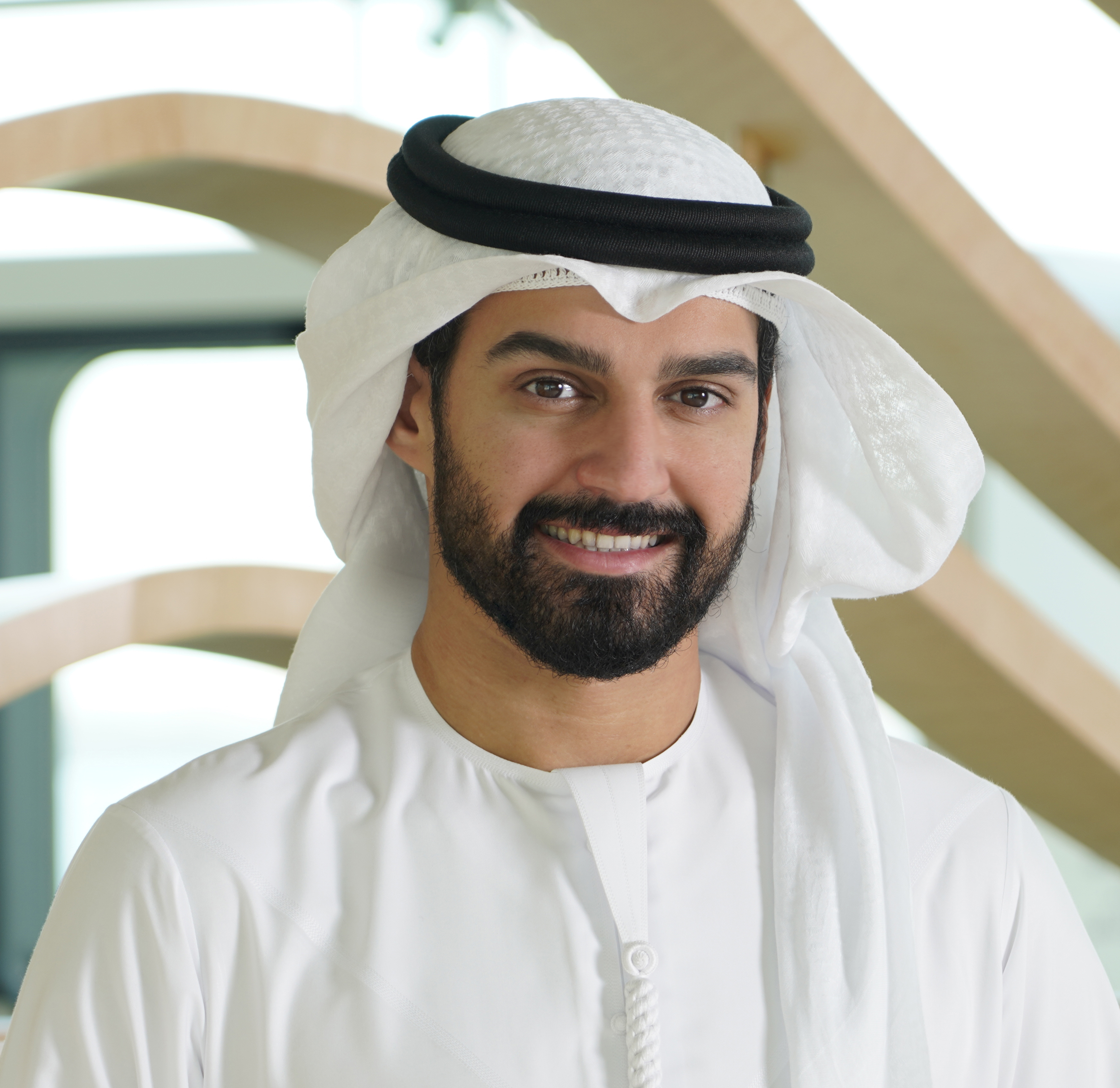
- Saeed Al Nazari
- Education: Executive Masters - Georgetown University; Strategy and Planning - London Business School
- Title: Director General, UAE Federal Youth Authority

Saeed Al Nazari is a United Arab Emirates (UAE) government official. He is the Secretary General of Great Arab Minds, and served as the director general of the Federal Youth Authority, executive director of the youth at the UAE Prime Minister's Office, and chief strategy officer of the Arab Youth Center. During his career, he has overseen more than fifty national projects, including the development of the National Youth Agenda and the Emirati Youth Empowerment Model in the UAE.

Saeed Al Nazari leads transformational projects and creative affairs at the Executive Office of Sheikh Mohammed bin Rashid Al Maktoum, vice president and prime minister of the UAE, and ruler of Dubai. He also oversees the Mohammed bin Rashid Center for Leadership Development, the region’s oldest leadership development institution, established in 2003. He manages the Arab Strategy Forum, which studies and analyzes the political and economic landscape of the Arab world. In 2023, he was appointed the secretary-general of the Great Arab Minds, an initiative equivalent to the Nobel Prize in the Arab world, and chairs the Dubai Creative Unit.

== Education ==
Al Nazari holds an executive master’s in business administration from Georgetown University, higher studies in leadership and foreign policy from New York University, a master’s degree in leadership and corporate entrepreneurship, and a BA (Hons) in business administration and human resources management from the Higher Colleges of Technology in Dubai. He is also an alumnus of the Sheikh Mohamed bin Zayed Scholars Program at New York University. Additionally, he graduated from the professional management studies program at Cambridge University in the United Kingdom, studied strategy and planning at London Business School, and completed the international fellows program as well as courses in strategic narratives and storytelling at the Center for Strategic and International Studies.

== Awards ==
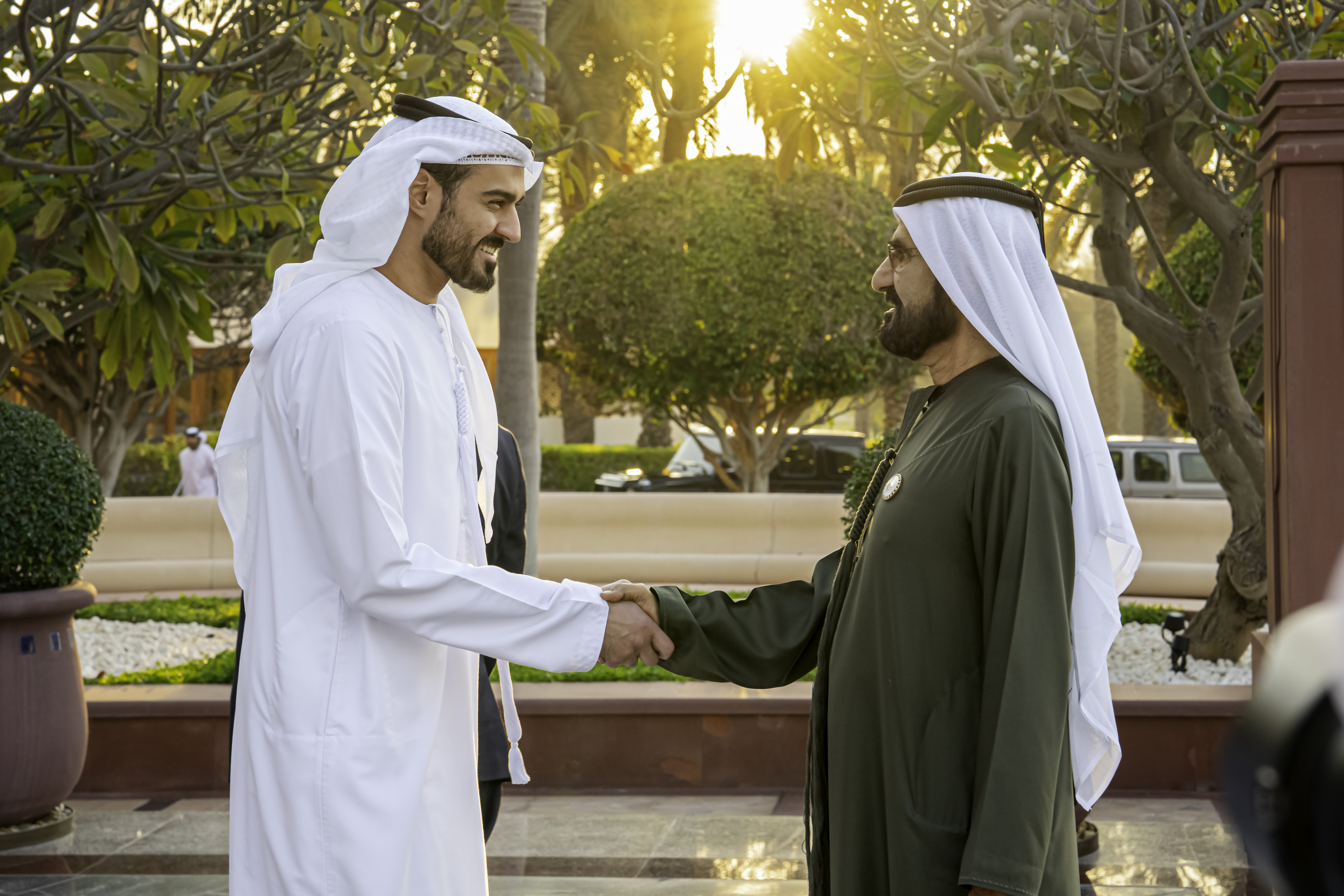
Saeed Al Nazari meeting Sheikh Mohammed bin Rashid Al Maktoum during the official gathering of Great Arab Minds Committee

Al Nazari has received more than 10 national and international accolades, including the Academic Excellence Award, Global Student Award, Leader of the Year Award at the Higher Colleges of Technology, and the Emirates Award for the Arabian Gulf Youth for his project Factory of Dreams. Factory of Dreams is a proposed crowd-funding website designed specifically to help low-income young entrepreneurs.

The Mubadala Youth Award in recognition of his passion and achievements in promoting leadership, innovation, and happiness through his work in society. In 2016, he was among the team members awarded by the Sheikh Mohammed bin Rashid Al Maktoum Excellence Award for the Youth Circles Initiative.

Also in 2016, he led the work on building the first healthcare drone in the UAE, which was shortlisted among the top five in the Drones for Good Award.

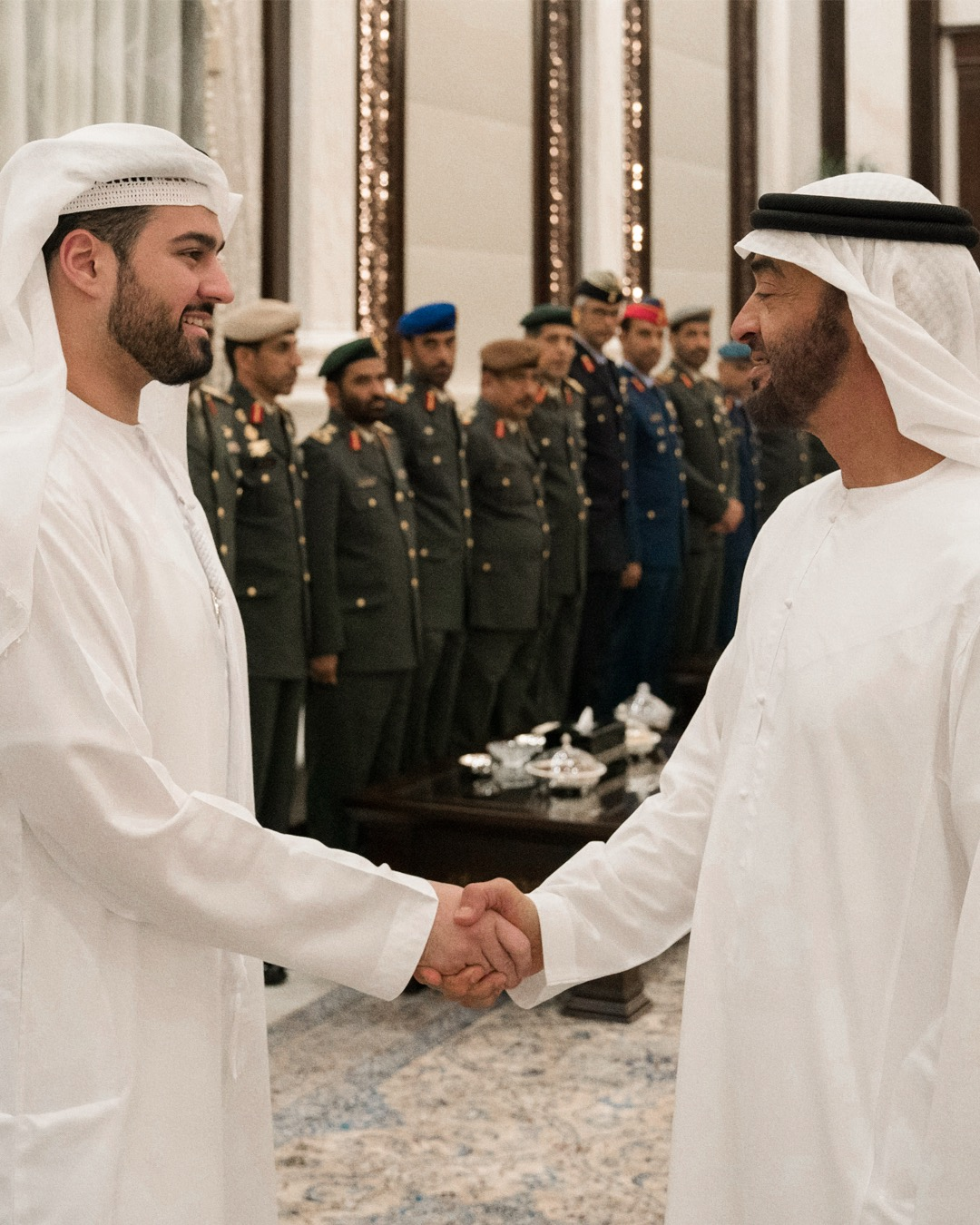
Saeed Al Nazari meeting Sheikh Mohamed bin Zayed Al Nahyan, UAE President

In 2019, Saeed Al Nazari received the King Hamad Youth Empowerment Award for his contributions to youth initiatives in the region.

== Career ==
Al Nazari began his career as a receptionist at Emirates Islamic Bank, later holding various roles, including investor and employee relations at Dubai Airport Free Zone, managing Emiratization projects at Noor Bank, and leading Learning and Development at Dubai Silicon Oasis.

Al Nazari was the youngest assistant manager - HR at the Noor Bank, back in 2012. Earlier than his role, Al Nazari worked as a Project Manager in the Executive Office of His Highness Sheikh Mohammed bin Rashid Al Maktoum, where he got to work on strategic projects like the Arab Social Media Influencers Summit, the Arab Strategy Forum, and AREA 2071.

He served as executive director of Youth Affairs at the UAE Prime Minister’s Office before being appointed Director General of the Federal Youth Authority by decree of the President of the UAE and the UAE Cabinet. This appointment made him the youngest undersecretary in the UAE federal government. In this role, he oversees the development and implementation of youth policies and programs, ensuring they align with the nation’s vision for youth empowerment. Saeed Al Nazari led the establishment phase of the Federal Youth Authority, reporting its strategic objectives, plans, programs, financials, and communication plans to the board of directors. As the Director General, he was part of the Golden Jubilee Celebration Committee, coordinating various youth engagement activities and events for the UAE's Golden Jubile.

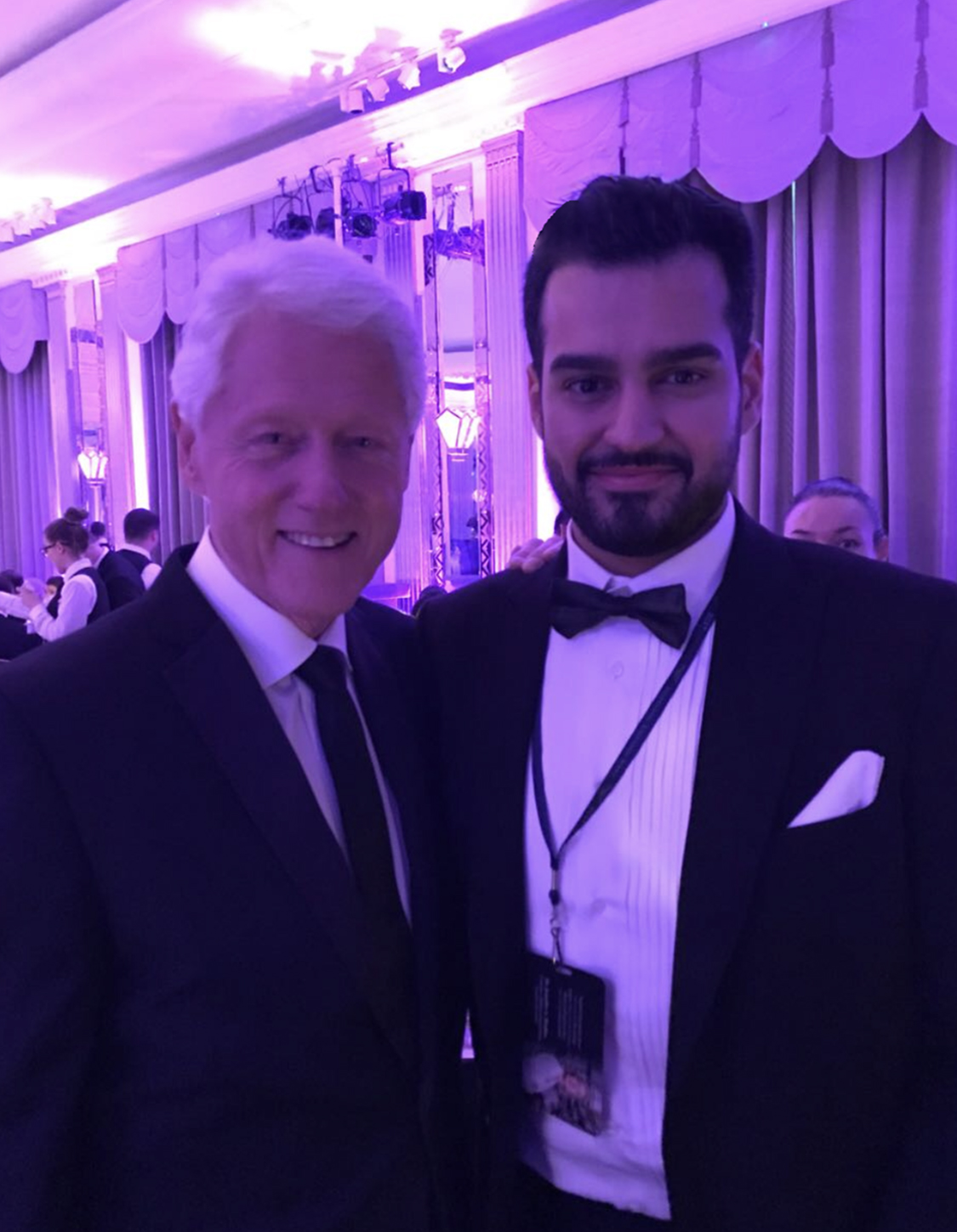
Bill Clinton, 42nd president of the United States with Saeed Al Nazari in a Gala Dinner

He was a founding member and Chief Strategy Officer at the Arab Youth Center, where he led the center’s development, strategy, and programs. He was responsible for establishing Special Olympics UAE, an NGO chaired by Sheikha Mariam bint Mohammed bin Zayed Al Nahyan. His efforts covered the strategy, establishment of the team, brand development, and digital presence.

In 2016, following the directive of Sheikh Mohammed bin Rashid Al Maktoum, he managed the transition phase of splitting youth affairs from sports, establishing the new youth sector within the UAE government.

=== Youth empowerment programs and strategic initiatives ===
Al Nazari has led and managed more than 50 national projects, including the Federal Youth Hub, National Emirates Youth Values Program, United Nations Youth Delegates Program, Emirates Youth Summer Academy, Young Economist Program, 100 Mentors Program, and the Youth Circles, which won the Mohammed Bin Rashid Government Excellence Award in the category of Distinguished Initiatives. As Chief Strategy Officer of the Arab Youth Centre, Al Nazari led and managed several regional initiatives and programs, including the Young Arab Media Leaders Program.

Al Nazari is a member of the National Committee for Sustainable Development Goals, and has previously served on the Boards of Directors for the Emirates Schools Establishment, the National SMEs Board, the Emirates Council for Advanced Skills, the Quality of Life Council, the Digital Quality of Life Council, and the National Human Resources Development Fund Management Committee. He also led the Youth Committee of the GCC and was a member of the Youth Committee of the Arab League and the Global Shapers of the World Economic Forum.

Enrolled in the UAE Government Leadership Program, Al Nazari was also a member of the first Emirates Youth Council and was appointed a global innovation ambassador at the Global Innovation Management Institute.

He participated in international forums, including the World Economic Forum’s Shape MENA, the Festival de Cannes in France, the Future Investment Initiative in Saudi Arabia, and the Academy of Achievement Summit.

In 2015 Saeed Al Nazari managed the first edition of the Arab Social Media Award and the Arab Social Media Influencers Summit, both initiatives launched by Sheikh Mohammed bin Rashid Al Maktoum. These events recognized the influence of social media in the Arab world and encouraged positive online engagement. He was a contributor to developing the Dubai Innovation Strategy, approved by Sheikh Hamdan bin Mohammed bin Rashid Al Maktoum, Crown Prince of Dubai. This strategy launched 20 initiatives aimed at making Dubai an innovative city, promoting a culture of innovation across sectors.

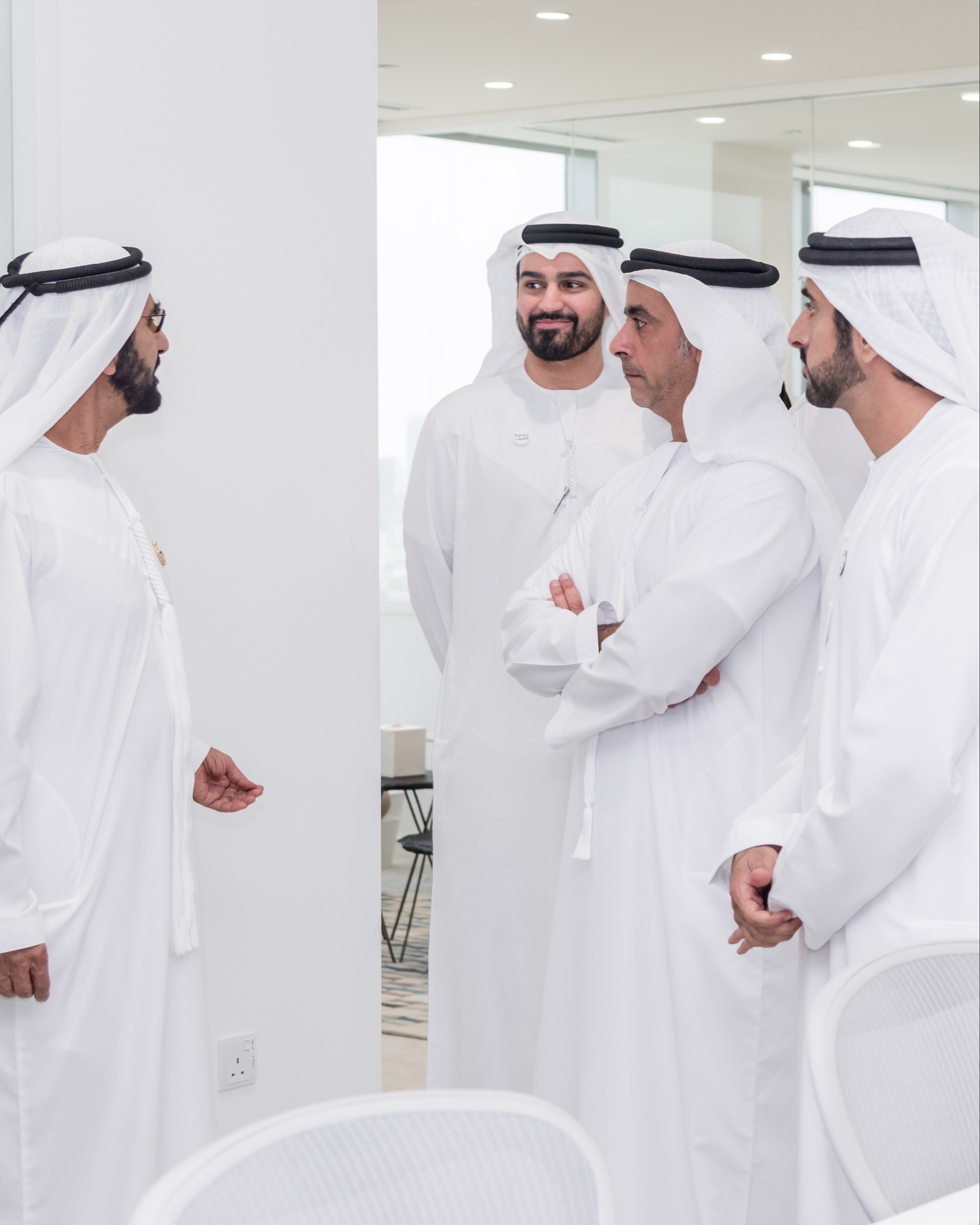
Sheikh Mohammed bin Rashid and Sheikh Hamdan bin Mohammed and Shaikh Saif bin Zayed and Saeed Al Nazari at Federal Youth Authority HQ

In 2016, when the Youth Sector was established as a ministry within the UAE Federal Government, Saeed Al Nazari led its development phase. He initiated and oversaw strategic projects, including the establishment phase, the first 100 days plan, and the national agenda.

He also led the National Youth Dialogue, launched by Sheikh Mohammed bin Rashid Al Maktoum. This initiative aimed to involve young Emiratis in discussions on national issues, encouraging their active participation in the policymaking process.

Saeed Al Nazari managed the development of the first National Youth Agenda, launched by Sheikh Mohammed bin Rashid Al Maktoum and approved by the UAE Cabinet. The agenda focused on strategic priorities for the development of young Emiratis in areas such as education, employment, and civic engagement. Also in 2016 he led, developed, and managed the Youth Circles initiative, which has become a global model for youth engagement under the patronage of Sheikh Mohammed bin Rashid Al Maktoum. The initiative has hosted over 1,500 circles with more than 100,000 participants.

Saeed Al Nazari managed the UAE UN Youth Delegate Programme, launched in partnership with the Ministry of Foreign Affairs and International Cooperation and the UAE Mission to the UN, under the patronage of Sheikh Abdullah bin Zayed Al Nahyan. The program provides young Emiratis with opportunities to represent their country at the United Nations.

He contributed to the development of Flow Café at Emirates Towers, a hub for ministers, CEOs, entrepreneurs, and employees to gather and collaborate.

Among his major contributions to the UAE, Saeed Al Nazari led and managed the development of Youth Hubs, the UAE's model for youth centers offering creative spaces and services. Launched by the UAE President and Vice Presidents, Al Nazari was instrumental in the design, programs, and operations of these hubs, including those in Dubai, Abu Dhabi, Ajman, Ras Al Khaimah, and Fujairah.

In 2016 Saeed Al Nazari developed the UAE Framework for Youth Empowerment, which was approved by Sheikh Mohammed bin Zayed Al Nahyan, President of the UAE, and Sheikh Mohammed bin Rashid Al Maktoum. The framework outlines strategic initiatives to support the development and empowerment of young Emiratis. During his tenure at Dubai Silicon Oasis, Saeed Al Nazari managed the "Happiest People" initiative, Dubai's first corporate happiness strategy and program. This initiative aimed to enhance employee well-being and productivity by fostering a positive work environment.

In 2016, Saeed Al Nazari contributed to the establishment and management of the Mohammed bin Rashid Endowment Center, launched by Sheikh Mohammed bin Rashid Al Maktoum. The center promotes the endowment culture in the UAE, supporting various sectors such as education, health, and social services, and serves as for sustainable philanthropy in the region.

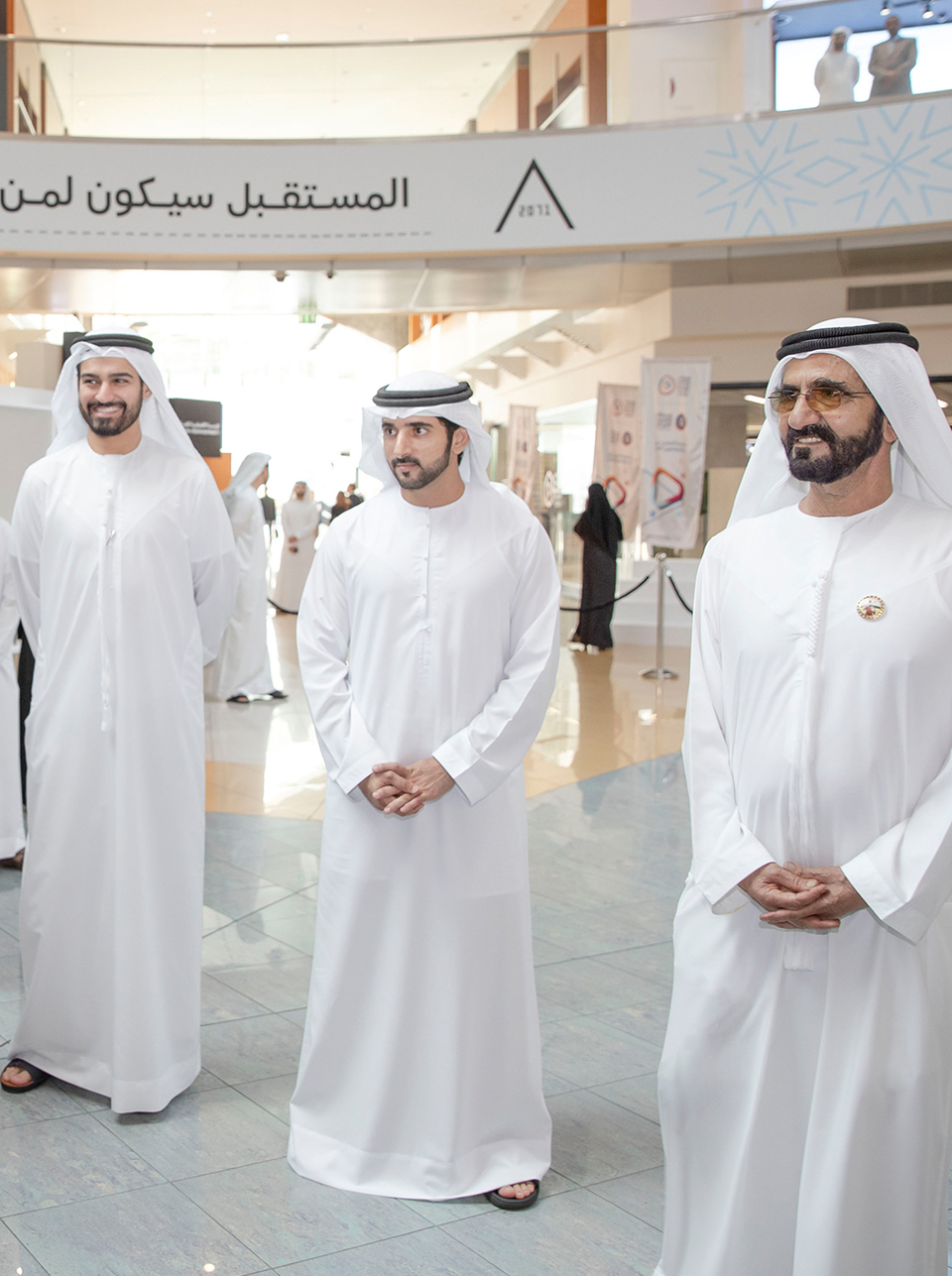
Sheikh Mohammed bin Rashid Al Maktoum and Sheikh Hamdan bin Mohammed Al Maktoum and Saeed Al Nazari during the launch of Youth launchpad

Saeed Al Nazari was involved in implementing seven educational innovative initiatives in schools and universities across the UAE, announced by Sheikh Mansour bin Zayed Al Nahyan. These initiatives aimed to promote innovation within the education sector, fostering a culture of creativity and forward-thinking among students.

Al Nazari was a member of the first Federal Youth Council in the UAE and managed the development of youth councils in various ministries and companies. These councils provide a platform for young people to engage with government officials and contribute to policy development.

In 2017, as part of the founding team of Area 2071, Saeed Al Nazari contributed to this initiative, launched by Sheikh Mohammed bin Rashid Al Maktoum and chaired by Mohammed Al Gergawi, Minister of Cabinet Affairs. Area 2071 is a platform designed to create an ecosystem that fosters innovation and collaboration among government entities, private sector companies, and startups, aligning with the UAE’s vision for its centennial in 2071.

Saeed Al Nazari led the development of the Youth Participation in Global Missions Policy, signed by the Prime Minister. This policy ensured that seats were allocated to youth in international delegations, enabling young Emiratis to gain global experience.

He managed and organized the first Youth Retreat in the UAE, bringing together ministers, strategists, and youth from multiple sectors to shape the UAE's strategy on youth empowerment. The retreat facilitated dialogue between young leaders and government officials, to develop collaborative ways to respond to challenges faced by the youth.

In 2017, Saeed Al Nazari contributed to drafting and managing the first National Policy on Youth Housing Awareness, approved by the UAE Cabinet. This policy aimed to educate young Emiratis on housing options and financial planning, ensuring they are well-equipped to make informed decisions about homeownership. Emirates Youth Global Initiative was launched by Sheikh Mohammed bin Zayed Al Nahyan, the President of the UAE. Saeed Al Nazari led and managed the Initiative, which engages Emirati youth globally. He also organized the first Emirati Global Youth Forum in the United Kingdom, aimed at connecting Emirati youth abroad.

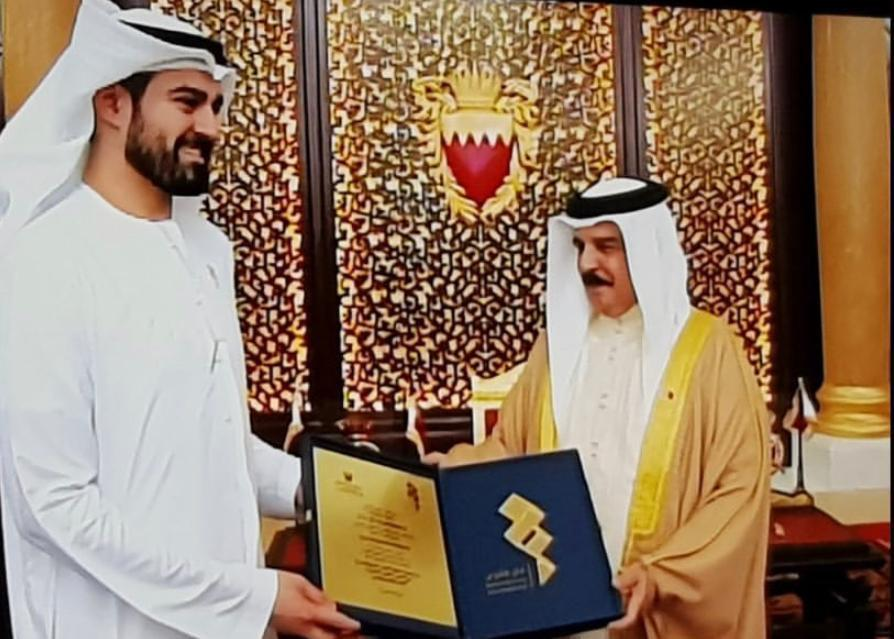
King Hamad, King of Bahrain Awarding Saeed Al Nazari

Also in 2017, Saeed Al Nazari managed the establishment of the Youth Data Hub in 2017, which collects and analyzes data related to the youth population in the UAE. The hub, built on public-private partnerships, provides insights that aid policymakers in developing strategies that benefit young Emiratis.

Al Nazari was the leader and manager of the inaugural Young Arab Media Leaders Program, launched under the patronage of Sheikh Mansour bin Zayed Al Nahyan, Deputy Prime Minister and Minister of Presidential Affairs. The program brought together young leaders specializing in media from across the Arab world to enhance their capabilities, build their networks, connect them with opportunities in the media sector, and prepare them to lead various areas and sectors within Arab media.

He was the main organizer and manager of the first Arab Youth Forum, organized under the umbrella of the World Government Summit and under the patronage of Sheikh Mansour bin Zayed Al Nahyan, Deputy Prime Minister and Minister of Presidential Affairs. The forum brought together young leaders from across the Arab world to discuss common challenges.

Saeed Al Nazari was a key figure in the UAE Initiative for Connection with Orphans and Minors, launched by Sheikh Mohammed bin Rashid Al Maktoum, Vice President and Prime Minister of the UAE, and Ruler of Dubai. The initiative aimed to integrate orphans and minors into society by providing them with mentorship and support.

Al Nazari developed the Young Arab Diplomatic Leaders program, aimed at training and mentoring the next generation of Arab diplomats. The program provides young leaders with the skills and knowledge needed to represent their countries on the global stage.

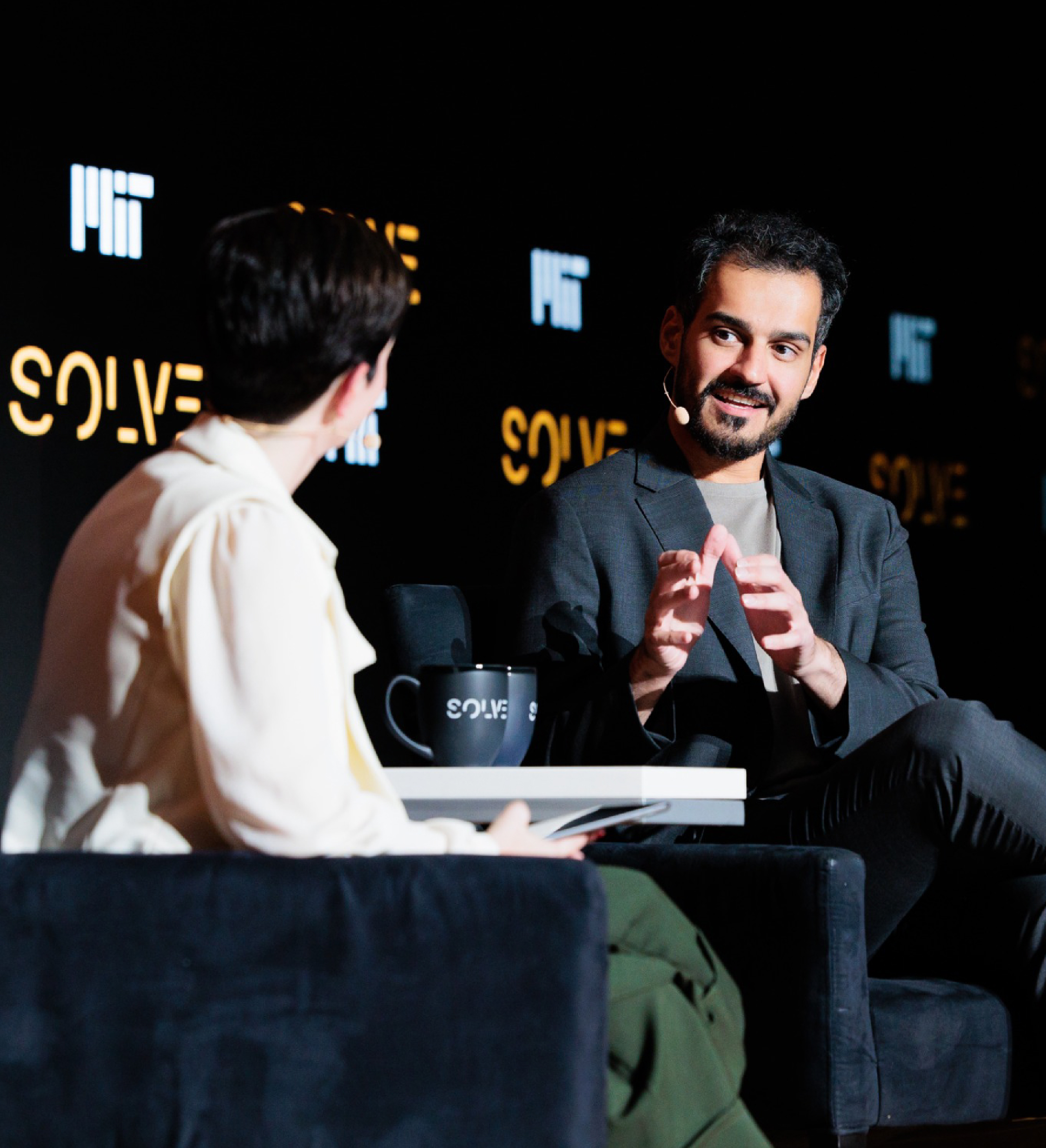
Saeed Al Nazari speaking at the Massachusetts Institute of Technology campus in Boston, USA

He worked on the first Arab Youth Podcast Initiative, aimed at developing new leaders in the media sector. This initiative provides a platform for young people to share their perspectives and stories.

In 2017 Saeed Al Nazari chaired the organizing committee for the first edition of the Arab Meeting for Young Leaders at the World Government Summit. This meeting brought together young leaders from across the Arab world to discuss key issues and share practices.

Al Nazari managed the Young Arab Media Leaders Program, an initiative under the patronage of Sheikh Mansour bin Zayed Al Nahyan, Deputy Prime Minister and Minister of Presidential Affairs. The program aims to train young media professionals and enhance their skills in journalism, broadcasting, and digital media.

He also led the Emirates Youth Summer Academy, offering over 100 workshops aimed at building character, sharing knowledge, and providing entertainment. The academy provides young people with opportunities to learn new skills, engage in creative activities, and connect with peers.

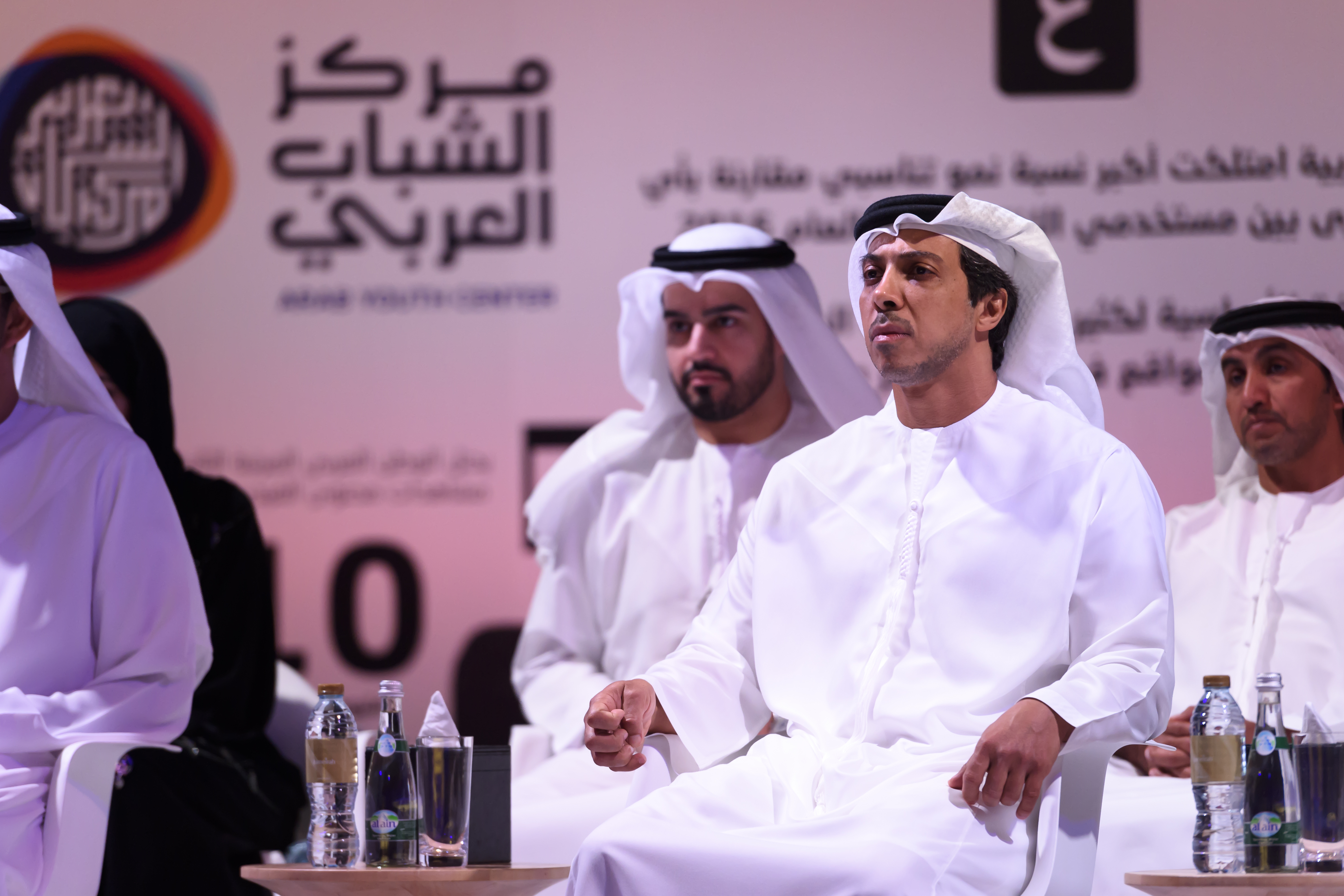
Sheikh Mansour bin Zayed Al Nahyan and Saeed Al Nazari at Arab Youth Center’s Event

Launched by Sheikh Mohammed bin Rashid Al Maktoum, Saeed Al Nazari managed the Youth Launchpad, creating spaces for Emirati startups across the UAE. He also established an Emirati startup presence at Dubai Airports.

Under the patronage of Shaikha Fatima bint Mubarak, Saeed Al Nazari managed the Emirates Youth Values Program. This initiative included social experiments and the Emirati Values Iftar, which brought together different nationalities for Iftar at Emirati homes during Ramadan, promoting cultural exchange and reinforcing Emirati values.

Saeed Al Nazari managed the Arab Youth Technology Fellowship program, under the patronage of Sheikh Rashid bin Humaid Al Nuaimi, in partnership with multiple technology companies. This fellowship provides young tech enthusiasts with training, mentorship, and experience in the technology sector.

Saeed Al Nazari developed and managed the Young Arab Pioneers initiative, which has become a platform for talents in the Arab world. This initiative recognizes and supports young innovators and leaders, providing them with opportunities to showcase their work and connect with like-minded individuals.

Al Nazari worked in collaboration with the UN office in the UAE on a joint program to sponsor delegates from Arab countries to the UN. This program provides young leaders with the opportunity to participate in international diplomacy and gain experience in global governance.

He managed the development of the Youth 101 project, which includes a series of introductory courses on various topics. He managed the Government 101 course under the patronage of Sheikh Mohammed bin Rashid Al Maktoum and attended by Sheikh Mansour bin Zayed Al Nahyan.

In partnership with Watani, Saeed Al Nazari managed the UAE Identity Youth Ambassadors Program. This program equips youth with the tools and knowledge about Emirati culture and identity, fostering a sense of national pride and cultural awareness.

Under the patronage of Sheikh Hamdan bin Mohammed bin Rashid Al Maktoum, Crown Prince of Dubai, Saeed Al Nazari led the work on the Young Economists Program, aimed at building the next generation of Emirati economists.

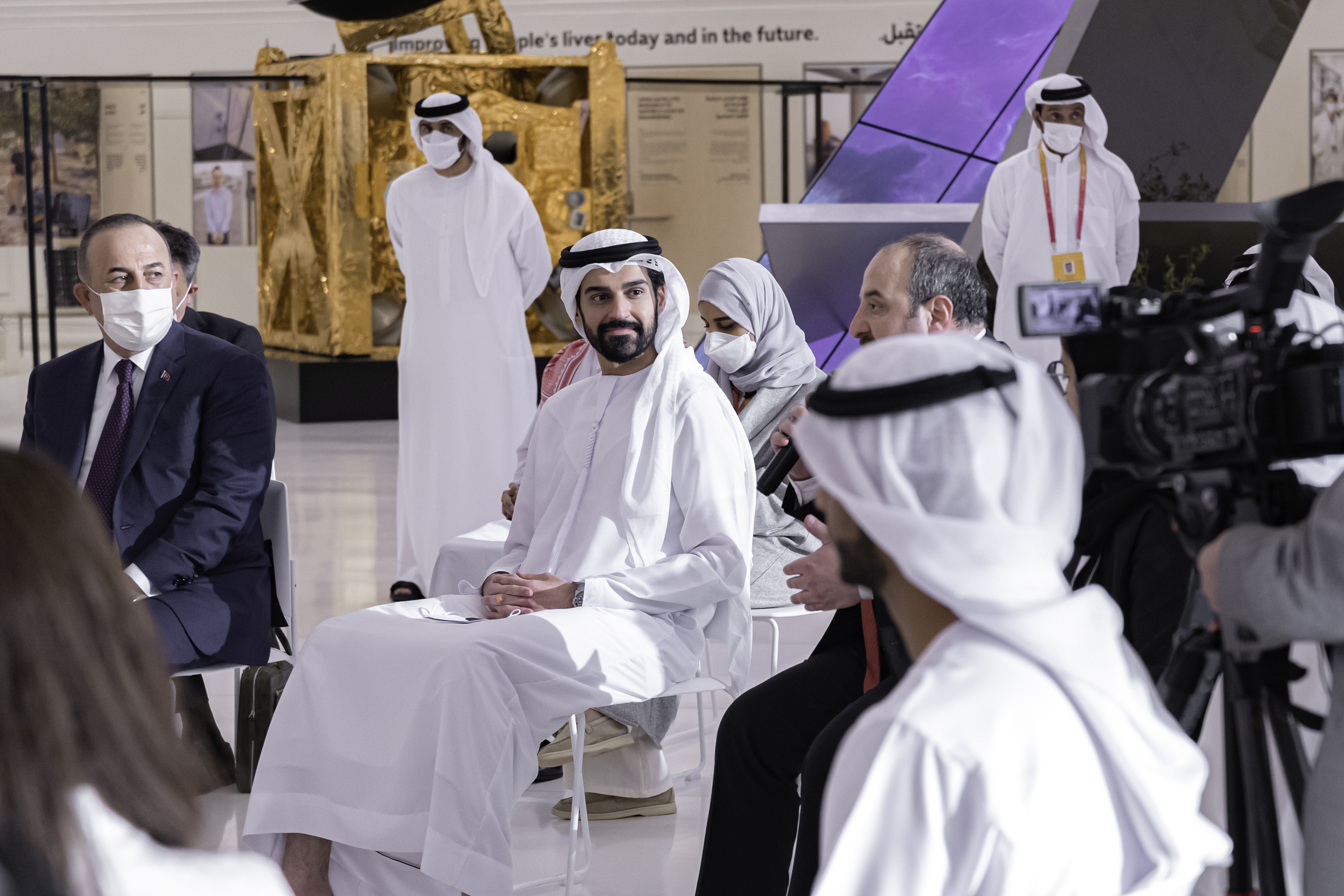
Saeed Al Nazari in a Youth Circle

Al Nazari managed the Early Dreamers Initiative, which collected stories, memories, and photos of the first generation who helped build the nation, preserving and sharing the UAE’s rich heritage.

To empower young people in debating and sharing their perspectives and research, Saeed Al Nazari led the work on Youth Debates in the UAE. This initiative provides a platform for young people to engage in discussions and develop critical thinking skills.

He led the establishment of the Emirates Youth Professional School under the patronage of Sheikh Mohammed bin Rashid Al Maktoum. The school offers vocational and professional training programs designed to equip young Emiratis with the skills needed for the job market.

In 2018 under the patronage of Sheikh Hamdan bin Mohammed bin Rashid Al Maktoum, Crown Prince of Dubai, Saeed Al Nazari developed the 100 Mentors initiative. This program connects young Emiratis with experienced mentors, providing guidance for their personal and professional development.

Al Nazari led and managed the Done by Youth initiative, aimed at crowdsourcing youth’s skills and talents for national projects and activities. He also designed the Done by Youth seal, awarded to youth-led projects and startups.

Saeed Al Nazari worked on the creation and management of Arab Youth Pitches, an initiative under the patronage of Sheikh Mansour bin Zayed Al Nahyan, which provided a platform for young innovators to present their ideas and projects to potential investors.

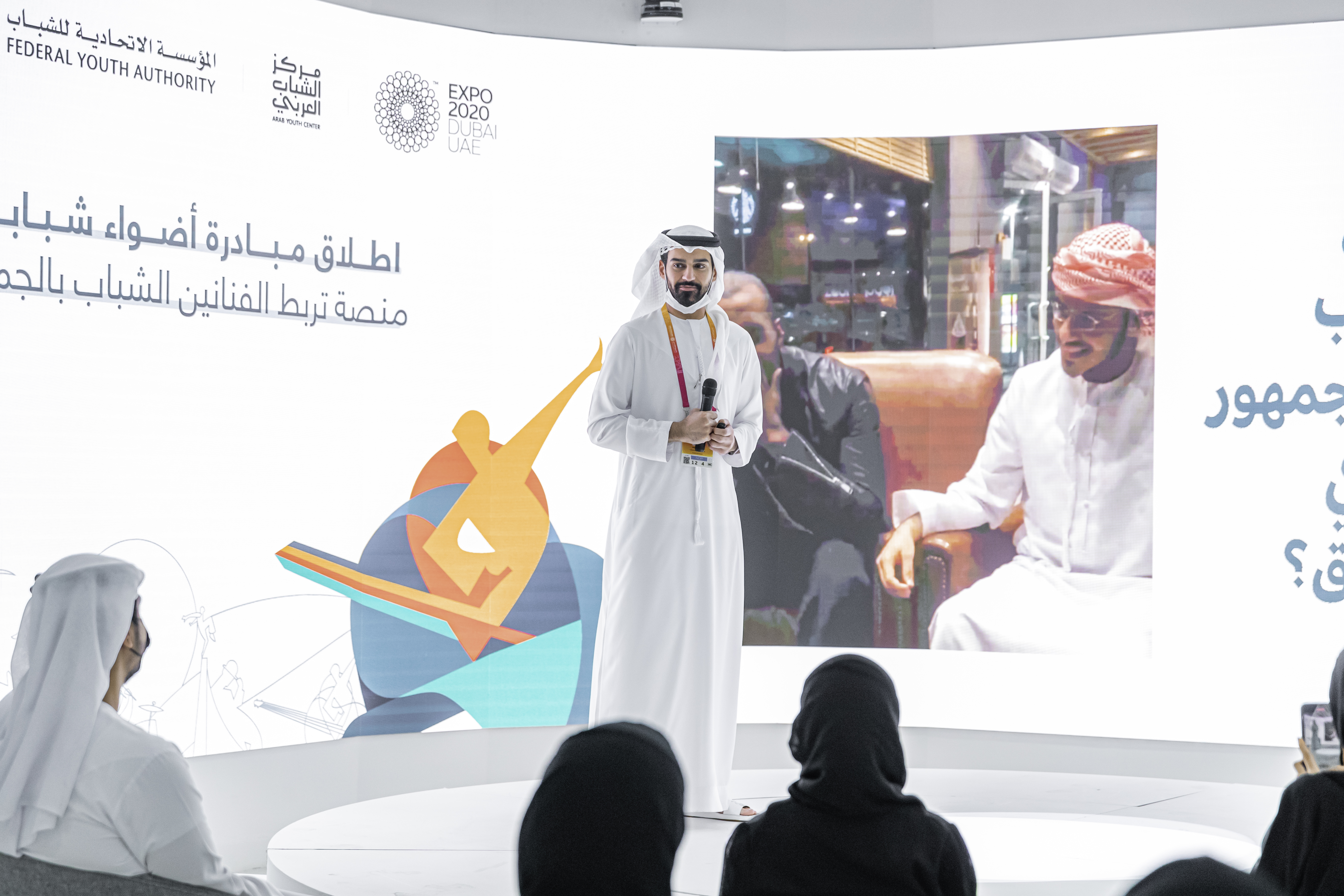
Saeed Al Nazari launching Youth Spots

Also in 2018, Saeed Al Nazari was the main organizer and leader of the Arab Youth Startup Marketplace, an initiative under the patronage of Sheikh Mansour bin Zayed Al Nahyan, which showcased startups founded by young entrepreneurs, providing them with opportunities to network, collaborate, and secure funding.

He organized the Sudan Youth Forum, bringing together young leaders from Sudan to discuss their country’s challenges and opportunities. The forum aimed to foster dialogue and collaboration among Sudanese youth. Saeed Al Nazari developed the first Youth Farmers Market, which provides a platform for young agricultural entrepreneurs to showcase and sell their products, supporting sustainable farming practices and local agriculture.

Al Nazari led the development of the Arab Youth Facts Platform, the first index covering Arab youth facts. This platform gathers and analyzes data on various aspects of youth life in the Arab world, providing insights for policymakers and stakeholders.

He led the Arab Youth Research Initiative, launched during his participation in the Arab Knowledge Forum. This initiative promotes research and knowledge production among Arab youth, encouraging them to contribute to the region’s intellectual and academic development.

Saeed Al Nazari developed the Arab Youth Opportunities Platform, launched by Sheikh Mansour bin Zayed Al Nahyan. This platform provides young people with information about educational, employment, and entrepreneurial opportunities.

Al Nazari also led and managed the establishment of the Arab Youth Researchers Council, which includes members from various Arab countries. This council supports research and collaboration among young Arab scholars.

In partnership with the UAE Scholarships Office, Saeed Al Nazari worked on a scholarship program that sends Emirati youth to key entities worldwide. The program includes internship opportunities at institutions such as the IMF.

Saeed Al Nazari led and managed the Youth Internships Program, offering local, regional, and global internship opportunities for Emirati youth.

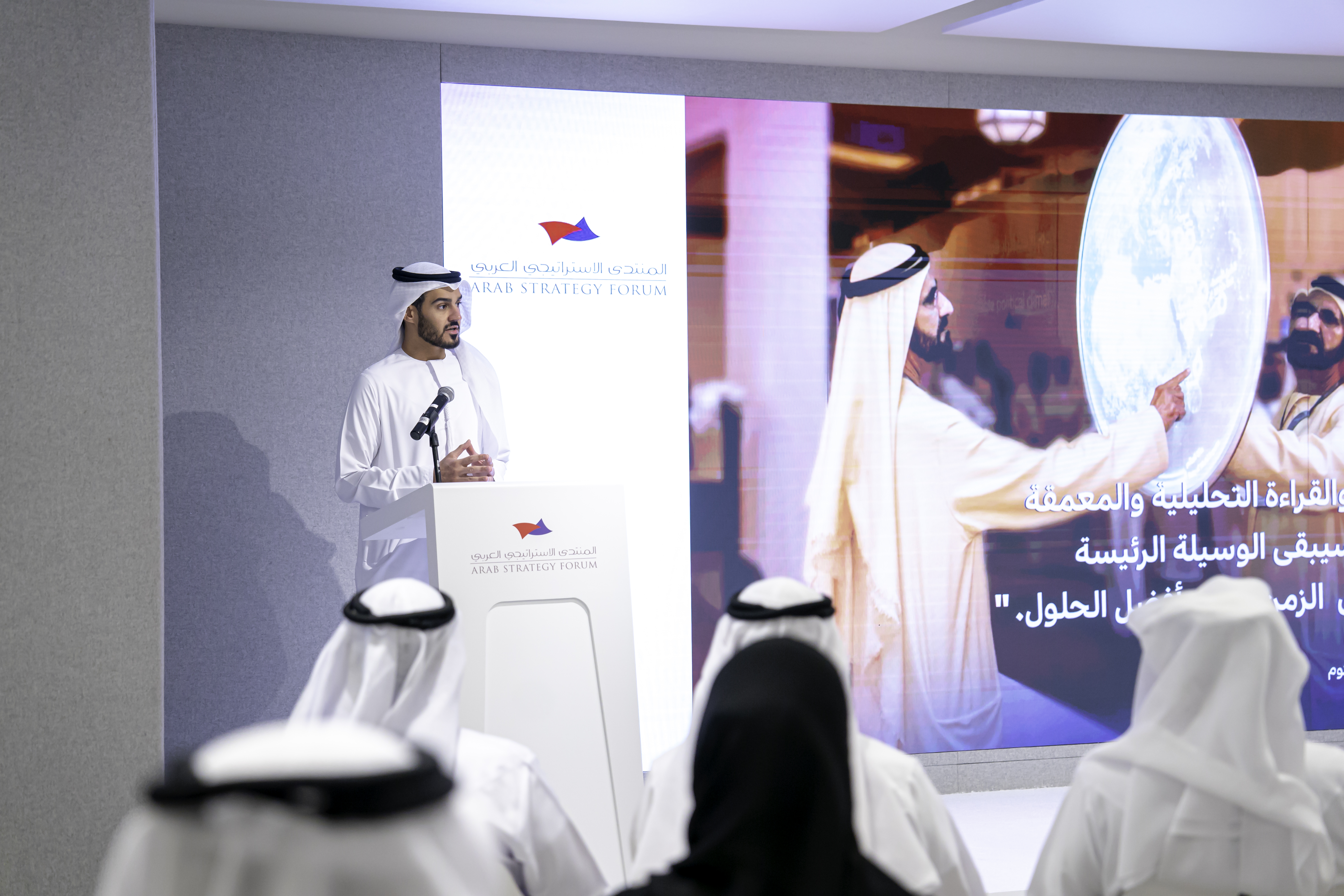
Saeed Al Nazari giving a speech at Arab Strategy Forum

In 2019 Al Nazari managed the Fakher Initiative in partnership with the UAE Ministry of Defence, celebrating the efforts of the UAE Armed Forces and national service participants. He also organized the first Fakher Forum under the patronage of Sheikh Abdullah bin Zayed Al Nahyan, Minister of Foreign Affairs and International Cooperation, which highlighted the contributions of the UAE military.

In 2019, Saeed Al Nazari managed a series of Arab Youth Hackathons, which gathered young people to create new approaches to challenges in the Arab world. These hackathons focused on areas such as education, healthcare, and sustainability.

Al Nazari was involved in developing the campaign and brand for the UAE's first mission to send an astronaut to the International Space Station, known as Zayed’s Ambition. He managed the campaign and branding efforts, ensuring widespread awareness and support for this mission.

In 2020, during the UAE's efforts to combat COVID-19, Saeed Al Nazari served as the official spokesperson for youth and managed the Youth Readiness Initiative, which included multiple support programs to keep youth engaged and productive during the pandemic.

As part of his role in youth empowerment and community development, Saeed Al Nazari worked on an initiative launched by Sheikh Mohammed bin Rashid Al Maktoum to celebrate the weddings of youth who chose to organize simple ceremonies. This initiative promoted family values over materialism and included the development of a platform to recognize these model couples.

Saeed Al Nazari was appointed the Commissioner General of the Youth Pavilion at Expo 2020 Dubai, where he managed its strategy, branding, visitor experience, and programs. The pavilion, developed under his leadership, was awarded by the Bureau International des Expositions for its innovative design and impact.

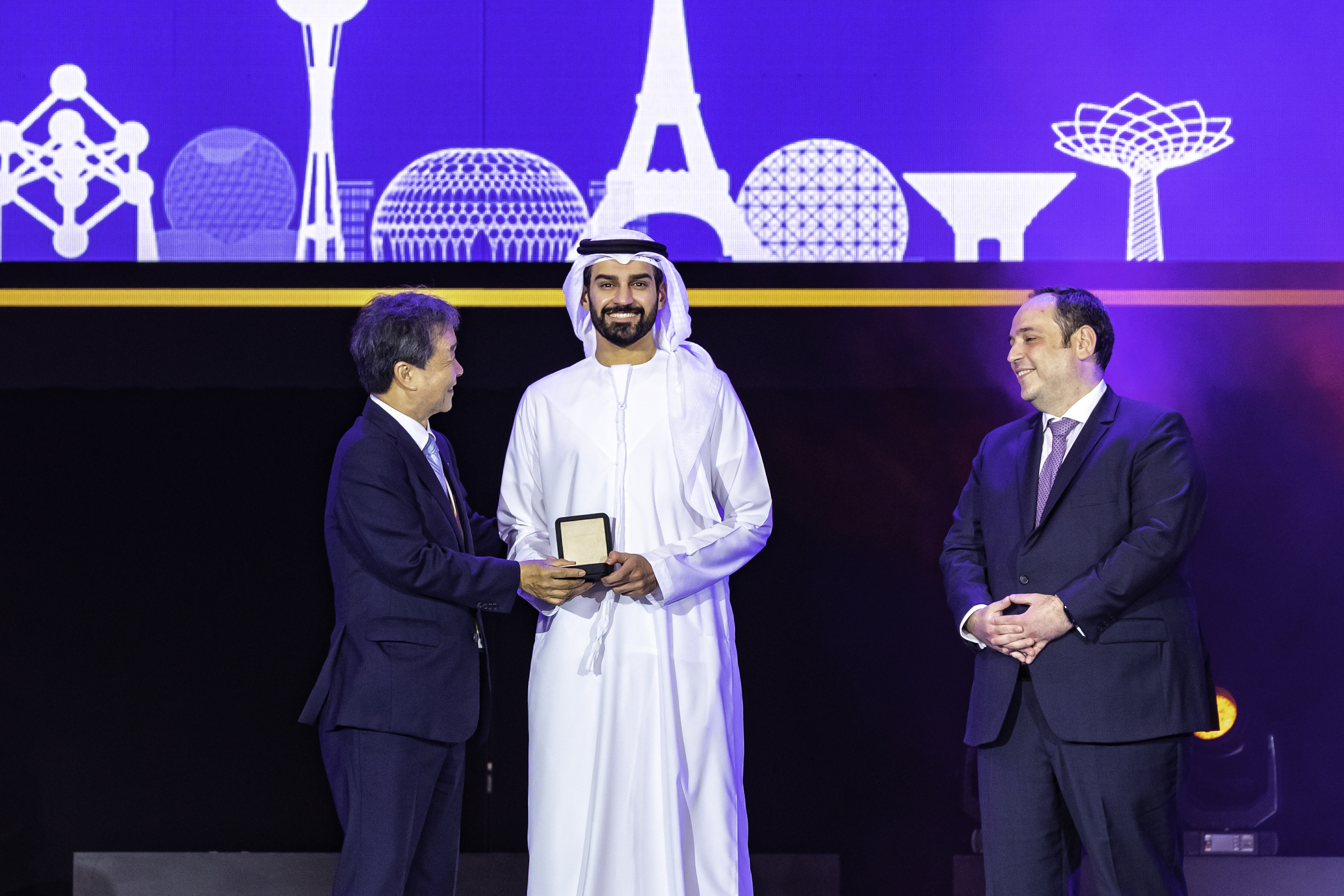
Saeed Al Nazari speaking at the Massachusetts Institute of Technology campus in Boston, USA

Al Nazari was also a part of a group of judges evaluating pavilions during Expo 2020 Dubai. His role involved assessing the design, content, and impact of the pavilions. Saeed Al Nazari co-authored the Arab Youth Journals with the Arab Youth Center, featuring reflections by Arab youth during COVID-19. This publication captures the experiences and insights of young people during the pandemic. Al Nazari led and managed the Emirates Youth Career Counseling Program, which provides young Emiratis with guidance and support as they navigate their career paths. This program offers resources such as career counseling sessions, workshops, and mentoring opportunities.

He led and managed the development of the Youth Spots Initiative and the creation of an app to regulate public art and busking in the UAE. This initiative stimulates creative expression and public engagement, providing young artists and performers with platforms to showcase their talents.

In 2021, Saeed Al Nazari was part of the steering workforce for establishing Nafis, a UAE-based initiative aimed at increasing Emiratization in the pri

vate sector. The initiative provides incentives and support to private companies to hire and retain Emirati talent, promoting national workforce participation.

He worked on over 50 workshops engaging youth to think and co-create the UAE strategy for the next 50 years. These workshops provided a platform for young people to share their ideas and visions for the future.

In 2022 he started to supervise the Mohammed bin Rashid Leadership Development Center. launched by Sheikh Mohammed bin Rashid Al Maktoum and chaired by Mohammed Al Gergawi, Saeed Al Nazari supervised He managed its new programs and alumni affairs.

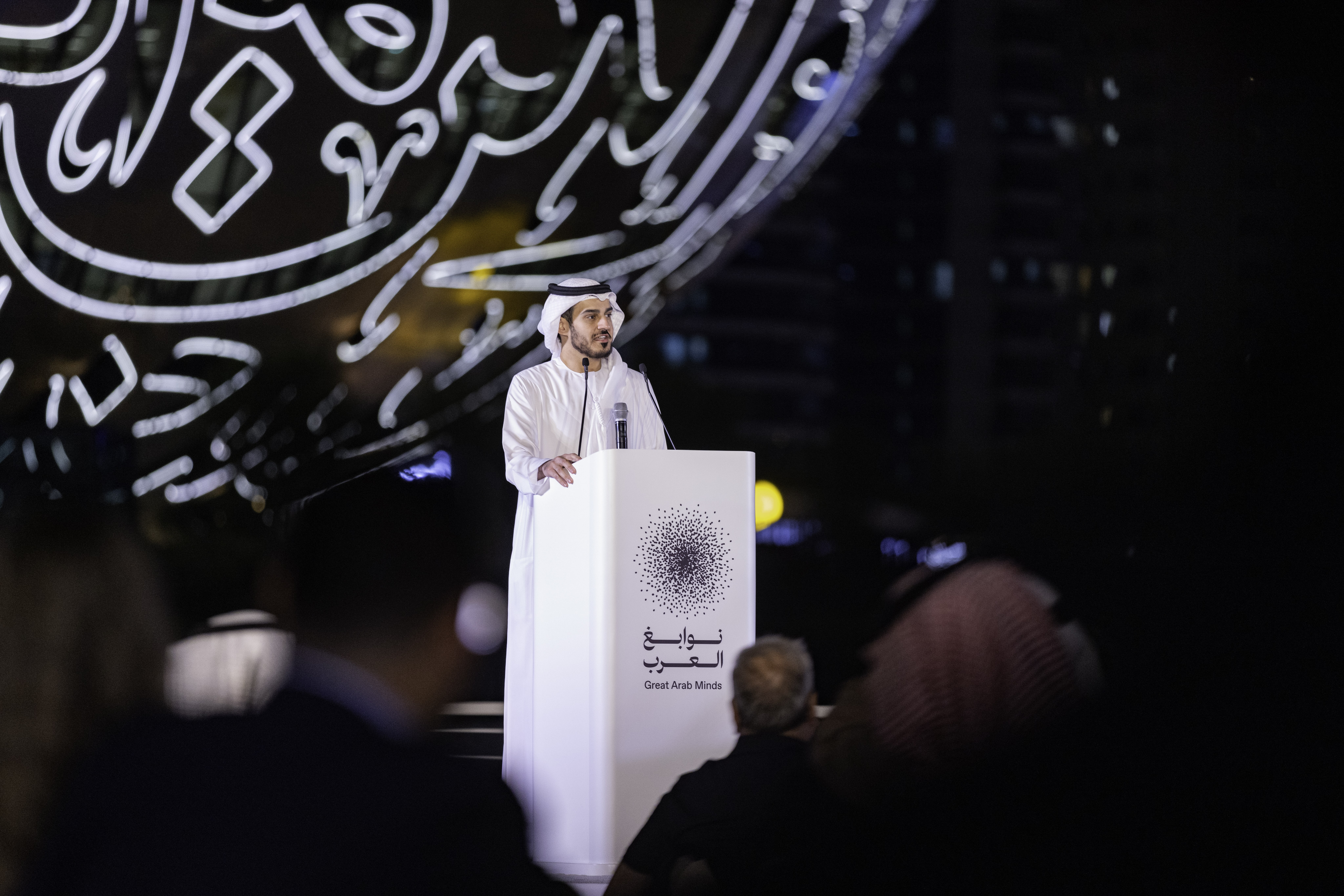
Saeed Al Nazari giving a speech at the Great Arab Minds Annual Event

Under the patronage of Sheikh Mohammed bin Rashid Al Maktoum and chaired by Mohammed Al Gergawi, Saeed Al Nazari led and managed the Dubai Leadership Camp, which offers strategic courses on leadership to over 100 participants.

In 2023, Saeed Al Nazari led the management of the Dubai Creative Unit, which introduced strategic urban interventions in key areas such as Al Marmoom, Freej Al Murrar, Warsan Nurseries, Dubai’s Gold Souk, and Satwa Street. These initiatives were designed to enhance Dubai’s urban landscape, promote sustainability, and improve residents' quality of life.

Known as the Nobel Prize of the Arab World, the Great Arab Minds initiative was launched by Sheikh Mohammed bin Rashid Al Maktoum and chaired by Mohammed Al Gergawi, Minister of Cabinet Affairs. Saeed Al Nazari was appointed Secretary-General and oversees the day-to-day management of the award, reporting directly to the chair.

Al Nazari supervised the Arab Strategy Forum, which provides critical insights into the political and economic state of the Arab world.

=== Global Happiness Organization ===
Saeed Al Nazari served as president of UAE chapter of Global Happiness Organization. The organization aims to raise awareness about the importance of happiness and to contribute to the realization of Sheikh Mohammed bin Rashid Al Maktoum's vision—Vice President of the UAE and Ruler of Dubai—particularly the Dubai 2021's first objective “achieve people's happiness”.

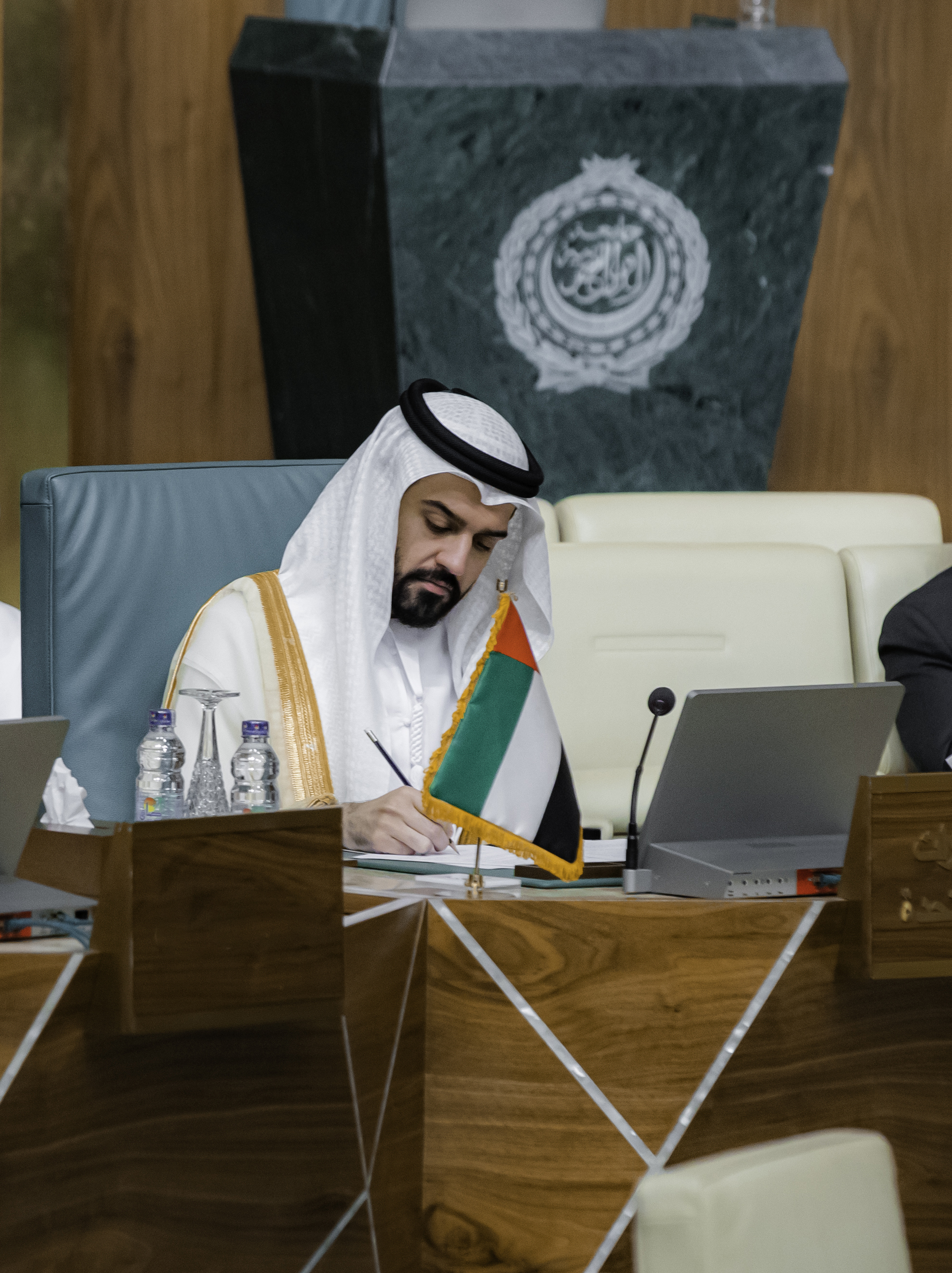
Saeed Al Nazari representing UAE at Arab League Meeting

=== Dubai Health Authority drone ===
He designed a drone for the Dubai Health Authority that can transport medical supplies and aid to patients at home or in emergencies. The drone was a semi-finalist in Dubai government's Drone for Good competition.

== Global participation ==
Saeed Al Nazari appeared on the Jordan Peterson Podcast, where he discussed his projects and shared his views on UAE’s role in the Middle East.

In 2020 Saeed Al Nazari spoke at MIT Solve, focusing on the role of science, education, and leadership in the Arab world. He highlighted the importance of collaboration in addressing regional challenges and advancing sustainable development.

The same year he gave a presentation about Great Arab Minds at Harvard University. He discussed the initiative's impact and the role.

Saeed Al Nazari moderated a key plenary session at the World Government Summit 2023, featuring a conversation with Amy Cuddy.
