= The Great Arab Minds Award =

Arab scholarship prize

Great Arab Minds Award
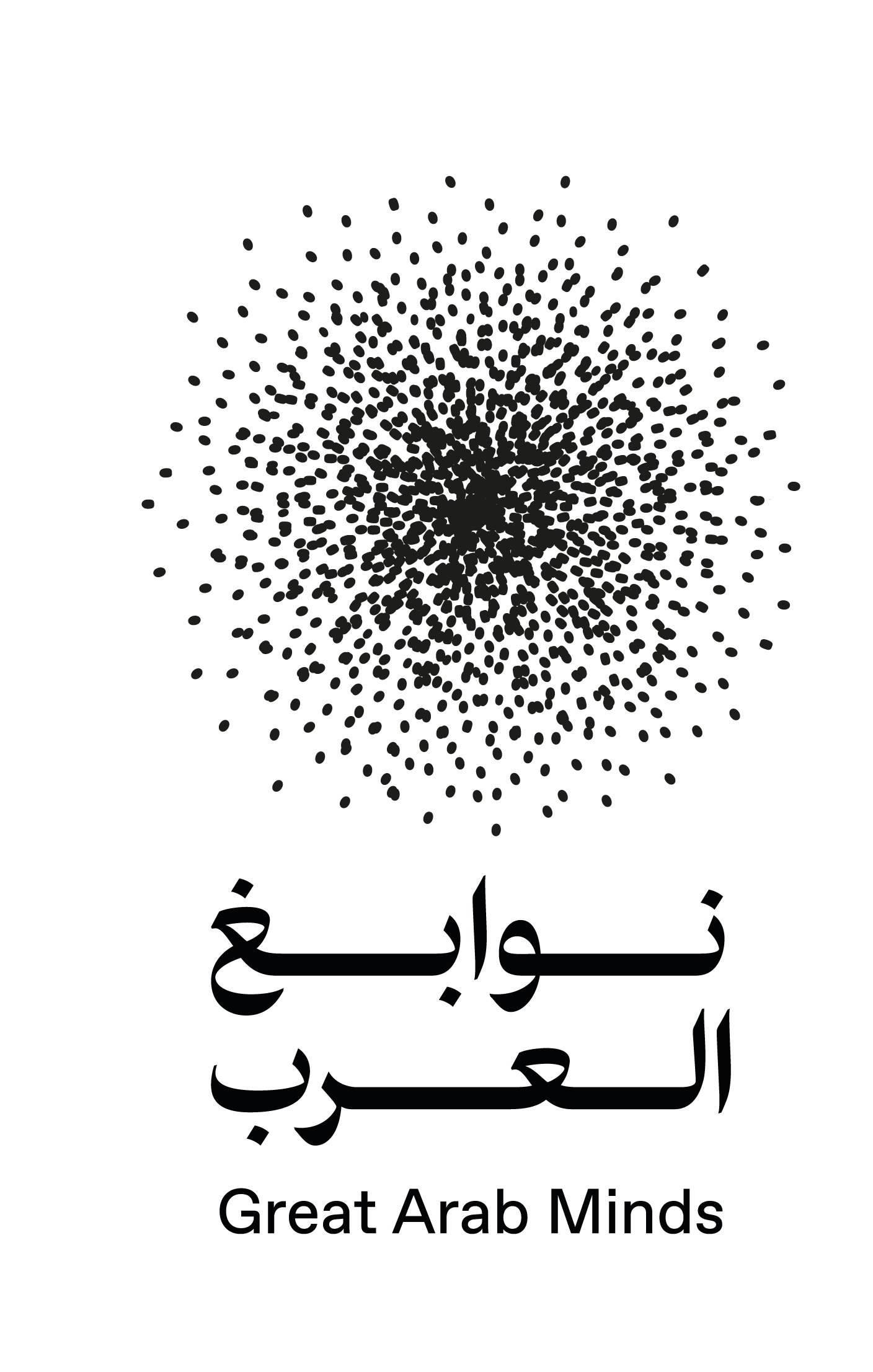
- Awarded for: Arab Scholars
- Country: United Arab Emirates
- Presented by: Sheikh Mohammed bin Rashid Al Maktoum, Vice President and Prime Minister of the United Arab Emirates, Ruler of Dubai
- Rewards: A trophy and monetary award of 1 million AED for each of the six categories
- First award: 8 January 2023
- Number of laureates: 6 per year
- Website: greatarabminds.ae

The Great Arab Minds Initiative is an annual award launched by Sheikh Mohammed bin Rashid Al Maktoum, Vice President and Prime Minister of the United Arab Emirates to honor Arab scholars.

The Great Arab Minds award is given in six categories: Natural Sciences, Medicine, Literature & Arts, Economics, Engineering and Technology, and Architecture & Design. One million Dirhams is awarded for each winner in each category to support research and projects.

== History ==
In June 2014 Sheikh Mohammed bin Rashid Al Maktoum published an article titled 'Reverse Brain Drain', highlighting the loss faced by the Arab nations due to the emigration of scholars. Eight years later, in January 2022, he inaugurated the award in the hopes of reducing brain drain in the Arab world.

== Main Objectives ==
- Reduce the emigration of Arab scientists, specialists, intellectuals, doctors, and engineers.
- Build a network of Arab thinkers, scientists, and exceptional talents to work as one team to drive the Arab world's intellectual renaissance.
- Support and encourage Arab scholars and scientists.
- Empowering a cluster of Arab scientists and thinkers to serve as role models for future Arab generations.

== Leadership Team and Specialist Committees ==
- Official Sponsor and Visionary: His Highness Sheikh Mohammed bin Rashid Al Maktoum, Vice President and Prime Minister of the United Arab Emirates, Ruler of Dubai.
- Higher Committee Chairman: Mohammad Abdullah Al Gergawi, Minister of Cabinet Affairs.
- Secretary General: Saeed Al Nazari.
- Jury Committees: Each category within the initiative is evaluated by a dedicated jury committee comprising Arab experts and specialists, alongside a Nomination Committee to review candidates.

== Award Recipients 2023 ==
- Hani Najm: Winner of the Great Arab Minds Award in the Medicine Category.
- Fadel Adib: Winner of the Great Arab Minds Award in the Engineering and Technology Category.
- Niveen Khashab: Winner of the Great Arab Minds Award in the Natural Sciences Category.
- Mohamed El Erian: Winner of the Great Arab Minds Award in the Economics Category.
- Lina Ghotmeh: Winner of the Great Arab Minds Award in the Architecture and Design Category.
- Waciny Laredj: Winner of the Great Arab Minds Award in the Literature and Arts category.

== Award Recipients 2024 ==
- Yasmine Belkaid – Medicine
- Oussama Khatib – Engineering and Technology
- Yacine Ait-Sahalia – Economics
- Omar Yaghi – Natural Sciences
- Sahel Al Hiyari – Architecture and Design
- Dia al-Azzawi – Literature and Arts

== Award Recipients 2025 ==
- Majed Chergui – Natural Sciences
- Suad Amiry – Architecture and Design
- Abbas El Gamal – Engineering and Technology
- Badi Hani – Economics
- Charbel Dagher – Literature and Arts
- Nabil Saydah – Medicine

== Awards ceremony ==
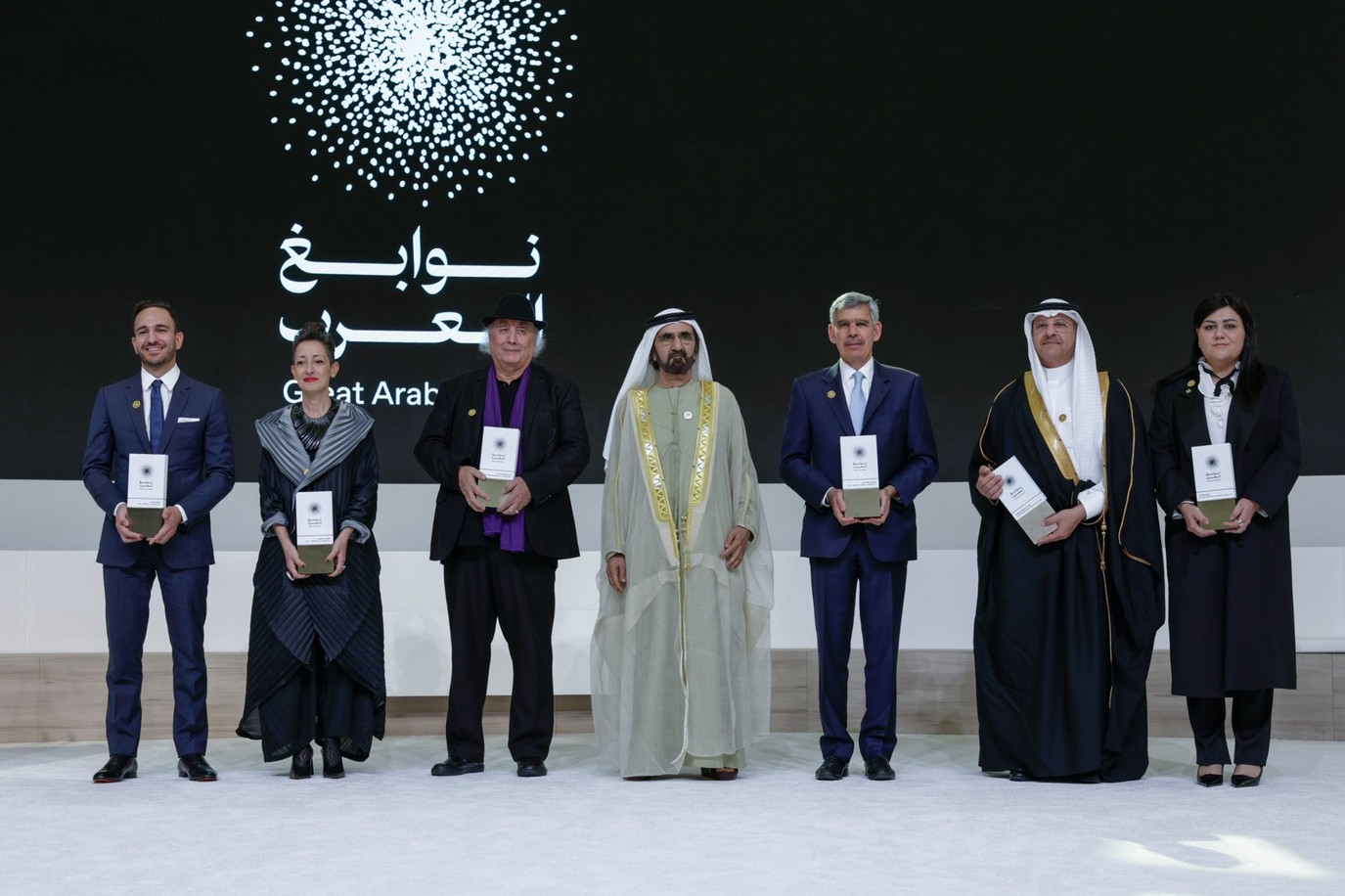
The ceremony for the winners of the first round of the Great Arab Minds Awards

The initiative has a total budget of AED 100 million, covering the award's expenses over five years. It awards a financial prize of AED 1 million to each winner in its various categories, dedicated to supporting scientific research and the development of innovative projects. The initiative's management also provides logistical support to the winners through partnerships with local and international institutions within the UAE, granting them access to advanced research centers and laboratories.

The results are announced by notifying the winners directly via video call from Mohammed Al Gergawi, Chairman of the Initiative's Higher Committee. Following this, Sheikh Mohammed bin Rashid publishes a post on his official X platform account detailing the winner's achievements.

An award ceremony for the winners takes place at the Museum of the Future in Dubai, attended by His Highness Sheikh Mohammed bin Rashid Al Maktoum, Vice President and Prime Minister of the UAE and Ruler of Dubai, along with several officials, Arab scientists, experts, and distinguished guests.

His Highness Sheikh Mohammed bin Rashid Al Maktoum presents the trophy of The Great Arab Minds Award to six winners in recognition of their achievements.

The trophy, designed by Yasmin Al Mulla, reflects the essence and resilience of the Arab individual, symbolizing their contributions to human civilization despite challenges. The base of the award is made of metal and features engravings of characters from the Ugaritic alphabet, one of the earliest known alphabets.

The award displays the logo of The Great Arab Minds, an illustration of a magnetic field that represents the convergence of minds, highlighting the role of role models, researchers, and scientists in advancing scientific progress in the Arab world and signifies the release and drive of energies toward achieving scientific advancement.
