= Noor Bank =

Defunct Emirati bank

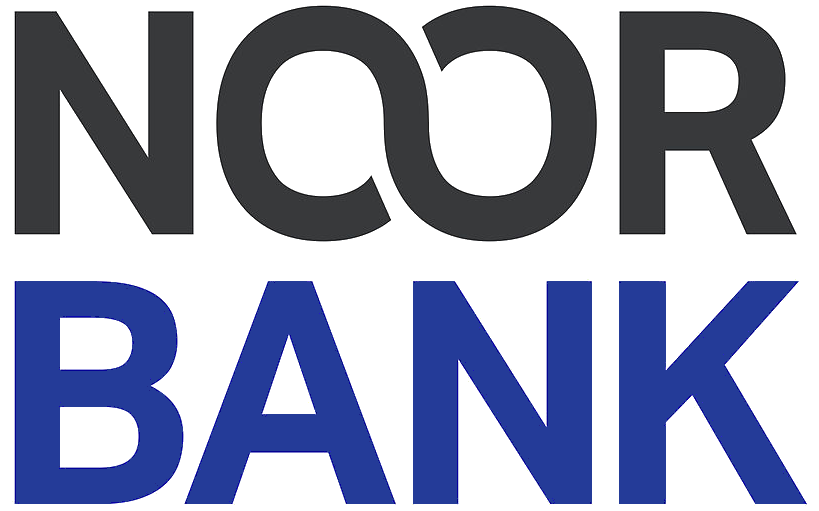
- Formerly: Noor Islamic Bank
- Company type: Private
- Industry: Banking, Financial services
- Founded: 2008
- Defunct: 2019
- Headquarters: Dubai, United Arab Emirates
- Key people: John Iossifidis (CEO); Mahendra Gursahani (COO)
- Total assets: ▲Dh50,719,198,000 (2018)
- Total equity: ▲Dh6,010,827,000 (2018)
- Parent: Noor Investment Group
- Website: www.noorbank.com

Noor Bank (formerly Noor Islamic Bank) was established in January 2008, in Dubai, United Arab Emirates.

In 2018, the bank was ranked the 11th largest bank in the UAE in terms of asset size.

Noor Bank is a full-service Shari’a-compliant bank, offering a range of products and services - in corporate and personal banking, wealth management, Takaful (Islamic insurance), treasury and trading. It has presence across the country, at multiple locations in Abu Dhabi, Dubai, Sharjah and Al Ain.

== History ==
Sheikh Mohammed bin Rashid Al Maktoum opened Noor Bank to the public on January 7, 2008. The bank's products and services are governed by a Shari’a Board, composed primarily of Islamic scholars from the fields of law and finance. Noor Bank is a subsidiary of Noor Investment Group LLC and a sister company of Noor Takaful.

In May 2008, the bank launched the first 24-hour, seven-days-a-week branch in the UAE. In November 2008, the bank opened a 24/7 branch at the Dubai Airport. In February 2009, the bank was ranked in the top ten mandated lead arrangers list by Bloomberg. That year, Noor Bank posted a net profit of US$139 million for the period ended December 31, 2008. After reporting an operating loss of US$2.5 million in the first half of 2010, the bank realized an operating profit of US$56.4 million by the second quarter of 2011. Noor Bank partnered with Emaar Properties in 2013 to provide mortgages to non-UAE residents.

In 2013, Noor Bank launched Noor Trade, a division of the bank directed at servicing small and medium enterprises (SMEs). Noor Trade is composed of two divisions, Business Banking and Emerging Corporates.

On 7 January 2014, the bank dropped 'Islamic' from its name, becoming 'Noor Bank' as part of a rebranding effort. That same year, the bank reported that its income had tripled.

As of 2016, Sheikh Ahmed Bin Mohammad Bin Rashid Al Maktoum is the bank's chairman, and the board of directors includes Sultan Ahmed bin Sulayem.

Dubai Islamic Bank officially acquired Noor Islamic Bank under the name Dubai Islamic Bank in December 2019.
