= Emirates Global Aluminium =

Aluminium conglomerate of the UAE

EGA
- Type: State-owned
- Industry: Aluminium
- Predecessors: Dubai Aluminium Company; Emirates Aluminium Company
- Founded: 2013; 13 years ago
- Headquarters: Abu Dhabi, United Arab Emirates
- Key people: Abdulla Jassim Kalban, President & CEO
- Owners: Mubadala Investment Company (50%); Investment Corporation of Dubai (50%)
- Number of employees: 7,000
- Website: ega.ae

Emirates Global Aluminium (EGA) is an aluminium conglomerate with interests in bauxite/alumina and primary aluminium smelting. A state-owned enterprise, it is jointly controlled by the Mubadala Investment Company and the Investment Corporation of Dubai, sovereign wealth funds of the United Arab Emirates.

EGA operates aluminium smelters in Abu Dhabi and Dubai, an alumina refinery in Abu Dhabi, and a bauxite mine and associated export facilities in the Republic of Guinea, a speciality foundry in Germany, and an aluminium recycling plant in the United States.

== History ==
In 1975, Dubai Aluminum (DUBAL) was founded as the UAE's first aluminium production company. The company's first working site was at Jebel Ali, it took four years for the production to start. In 2007, Emirates Aluminium (EMAL) was founded. In 2013, DUBAL and EMAL were merged to form Emirates Global Aluminium (EGA). In 2020, the company announced plans to establish a production facility in Colombia.

The 28 March 2026, Al Taweelah production base in the UAE had sustained "significant damage" during Iranian missile and drone attacks.

== Core smelter assets ==
EGA's core operating assets are Dubai Aluminium ("DUBAL") and Emirates Aluminium ("EMAL") – whose combined production is 2.34 million tonnes per annum ("tpa"). DUBAL's Jebel Ali operation – comprising a 1 million tpa smelter, a 2,350 MW power station and other facilities – is one of the world's largest single-site primary aluminium smelters. EMAL's Al Taweelah operation – comprising a 1.3 million tpa smelter, a 3,100 MW power station and other facilities – is the world's largest single-site primary aluminium producer.

== GAC ==
EGA is a member of the Gulf Aluminum Council ("GAC"), which represents, promotes and protects the interests of the aluminium industries within the Persian Gulf region.
