= Niveen Khashab =

Lebanese chemist

Niveen M. Khashab is a Lebanese chemist and a Professor of chemical Sciences and engineering at King Abdullah University of Science and Technology in Saudi Arabia since 2009. She is a laureate of the 2017 L'Oréal-UNESCO Awards for Women in Science "for her contributions to innovative smart hybrid materials aimed at drug delivery and for developing new techniques to monitor intracellular antioxidant activity." She is also a fellow of the Royal Chemical Society, and a member of the American Chemical Society.

== Education ==
Niveen M. Khashab received her B.S. in Chemistry from the American University of Beirut, Lebanon, followed by her PhD in chemistry at the University of Florida.

== Research and career ==
Professor Khashab's research focuses on the design, synthesis, and use of "smart" programmable nanomaterials, emphasizing the systems' controlled release and delivery characteristics. These synthetic materials are applied for biomimetic biological (distribution, sensing, and imaging), industrial (nanocomposites), and environmental (synthesis of membranes) applications, respectively. Niveen's research interests include leveraging the natural microporosity of supramolecular assemblies for energy-intensive separations. Her research team is particularly interested in the separation of benzene derivatives employing macrocycles and cages designed for optimal separation via molecular recognition. Her team has produced a variety of self-assembled capsules (SACs) for the encapsulation and transport of RNA, DNA, and proteins. She focuses on the encapsulation and delivery of CRISPR-Cas9 to enhance targeted gene editing.

With more than ten years of professional experience, Prof. Niveen M. Khashab is presently a Full Professor and Head of the Chemistry Program at the King Abdullah University of Science and Technology.

== Bibliography ==
- Carbon Nanomaterials Sourcebook: Graphene, Fullerenes, Nanotubes, and Nanodiamonds, Volume I.

== Patents ==
Prof. Niveen M. Khashab has obtained many patents for her inventions including:

- Compositions of graphene materials with metal nanostructures and microstructures and methods of making and using including pressure sensors (US10807048B2)
- Magnetically controlled permeability membranes (US20180296469A1)
- Periodic mesoporous organosilica-doped nanocomposite membranes and systems including same (EP3471864A1)
- Nanocluster capped mesoporous nanoparticles, methods of making and use (US20200046849A1)
- Polymer carbon nanotube composite (US20160297952A1)
- Polymer nanocomposites and methods of making nanocomposites (US9650494B2)
- Separating aromatic isomers using aqueous solutions of cucurbituril macrocycles (WO2021124219A1)
- Periodic mesoporous organosilica-doped nanocomposite membranes and systems including same (US20200306701A1)
- Encoding Raman spectral data in optical identification tags for analyte identification (WO2021053409A1)

== Publications ==
- Jonas G. Croissant, Yevhen Fatieiev, Niveen M. Khashab. "Degradability and Clearance of Silicon, Organosilica, Silsesquioxane, Silica Mixed Oxide, and Mesoporous Silica Nanoparticles". WIley Online Library.
- Jonas G. Croissant, Yevhen Fatieiev, Abdulaziz Almalik, Niveen M. Khashab. "Mesoporous Silica and Organosilica Nanoparticles: Physical Chemistry, Biosafety, Delivery Strategies, and Biomedical Applications". WIley Online Library.
- Shahad K Alsaiari, Sachin Patil, Mram Alyami, Kholod O Alamoudi, Fajr A Aleisa, Jasmeen S Merzaban, Mo Li, and Niveen M Khashab. "Endosomal Escape and Delivery of CRISPR/Cas9 Genome Editing Machinery Enabled by Nanoscale Zeolitic Imidazolate Framework". ACS Publications.
- Jonas G. Croissant, Xavier Cattoën, Michel Wong Chi Man, Jean-Olivier Durand and Niveen M. Khashab. "Syntheses and applications of periodic mesoporous organosilica nanoparticles". Nanoscale.
- Jonas G Croissant, Dingyuan Zhang, Shahad Alsaiari, Jie Lu, Lin Deng, Fuyuhiko Tamanoi, Abdulaziz M AlMalik, Jeffrey I Zink, and Niveen M Khashab. "Protein-gold clusters-capped mesoporous silica nanoparticles for high drug loading, autonomous gemcitabine/doxorubicin co-delivery, and in-vivo tumor imaging". Journal of Controlled Release.
- Mram Z Alyami, Shahad K Alsaiari, Yanyan Li, Somayah S Qutub, Fajr A Aleisa, Rachid Sougrat, Jasmeen S Merzaban, and Niveen M Khashab. "Cell-Type-Specific CRISPR/Cas9 Delivery by Biomimetic Metal Organic Frameworks". ACS Publications.

== Awards ==
Niveen won the Great Arab Minds Award in Natural Sciences in 2023 for her contributions to chemistry, bioengineering, and biology. In 2024, she was granted Saudi citizenship by royal decree.
