= Waciny Laredj =

Algerian writer

- واسيني الأعرج
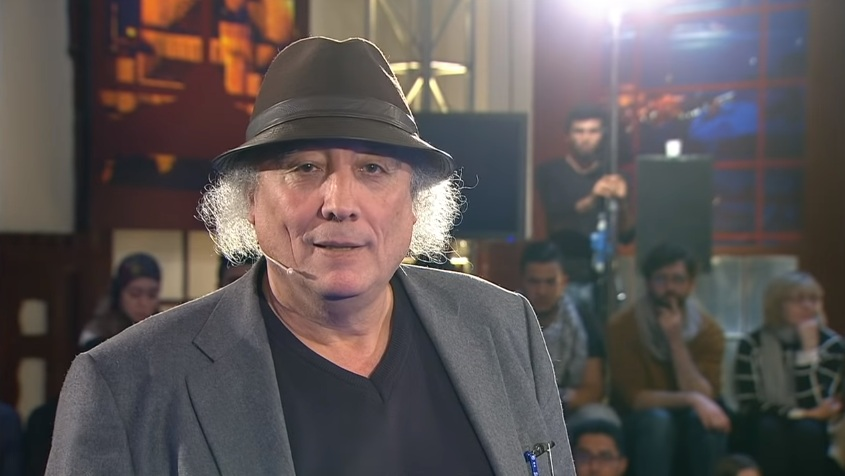
- Born: August 8, 1954 (age 72); Sidi Bou Jnan, Tlemcen Province, Algeria
- Education: University of Algiers, University of Damascus
- Occupations: Novelist, short story writer, academic
- Spouse: Zineb Laouedj
- Children: 2
- Writing career
- Language: Arabic, French
- Period: 1980–present
- Notable works: The Blue Gate, The Andalucian House, Ashes of the East
- Notable awards: Sheikh Zayed Book Award for Literature (2007); International Prize for Arabic Fiction (2011, 2014); Katara Prize for Arabic Novel (2015); Great Arab Mind Award for Literature and Art (2023)

Waciny Laredj (Arabic: واسيني الأعرج, pronounced Wasini al-A'raj) (born 8 August 1954) is an Algerian novelist, short story writer and academic.

== Biography ==
Laredj was born in Sidi Bou Jnan in Tlemcen province. He obtained a BA in Arabic literature from the University of Algiers and then went off to Syria to pursue postgraduate studies, aided by a government scholarship. He obtained an MA and a PhD from the University of Damascus.

Having finished his studies, he returned to Algeria and took up an academic position at his alma mater, the University of Algiers. He continued to teach there till 1994. The outbreak of civil war in Algeria in the 1990s forced Laredj to leave the country. After a short time in Tunisia, he moved to France and joined the faculty of the Université Paris III-New Sorbonne, where he taught Arabic literature.

As a writer, Laredj is well known throughout the Arabic- and French-speaking countries. Beginning in the early 1980s, he has published more than a dozen books. His novels often deal with the troubled history of his native Algeria. He translated himself some of his books into French. At least two of his books were available in French before they were available in Arabic.

Laredj and his wife Zineb Laouedj, have collaborated on an anthology on African literature in French, titled Anthologie de la nouvelle narration africaine. In the past, Laredj has produced literary programmes for Algerian television. He has also contributed a regular column to the Algerian newspaper El Watan.

== Awards and honors ==
- 2007 Sheikh Zayed Book Award for Literature, winner for The Prince's Book: The Paths of the Wooden Gates
- 2011 International Prize for Arabic Fiction, longlisted for البيت الأندلسي (The Andalucian House)
- 2014 International Prize for Arabic Fiction, longlisted for رماد الشرق (Ashes of the East)
- 2015 Katara Prize for Arabic Novel, inaugural winner of the grand prize valued at $260,000 for Butterfly Kingdom
- 2023 Great Arab Mind Award for Literature and Art, in recognition of his outstanding literary contributions.

== Personal life ==
Laredj is married to the poet Zineb Laouedj. They have two children.

== Selected works ==
- al-Bawwaba al-Zarqa (The Blue Gate, 1980)
- Waqa'i min Awja Rajulin Ghamara Sawb al-Bahr (Facts from the Sufferings of a Man Who Ventured Toward the Sea, 1981)
- Waq al-Ahdhiya al-Khashina (The sound of the rough shoes, 1981)
- Ma tabaqqa min Sirat Lakhdar Hamrush (What Remains from the Biography of Lakhdar Hamrush, 1982),
- Nuwwar al-Lawz (Almond Blossoms, 1983)
- Masra Ahlam Maryam al-Wadi'a (The Death of Tender Maryam's Dreams, 1984)
- Asmak al-Barr al-Mutawahhish (The fish of the wild land, 1986)
- Damir al-Gha'ib (1990)
- Faji'at al-Layla al-Sabi'a ba'd al-Alf, Raml al-Maya (The Disaster of the Seventh Night after the One Thousand Night, Raml al-Maya, 1993)
- La Gardienne des ombres. Don Quichotte à Alger (Protector of the Shadows: Don Quixote in Algiers, 1996; Harisat al-Dhilal, Don Quishotte fi’l-Jaza’ir, 1999)
- Les Miroirs de l’aveugle (The Mirrors of the Blind Man; Maraya al-Darir, 1998)
- al-Makhtuta al-Sharqiyya (The Eastern Manuscript, 2002)
- Kitab al-Amir: masalik abwab al-hadid (The Prince’s Book: The Paths of the Wooden Gates, 2004)
- Al-Bayt al-Andalusi (The Andalusian House, 2011)
- Mamlakatu al farasha (The kingdom of the butterfly, 2013)
- Nissaou Casanova (Casanova's women, 2016)
