= Nasdaq Dubai =

Dubai-based stock exchange

- Type: Stock exchange
- Location: Dubai, United Arab Emirates
- Founded: September 2005
- Owner: Dubai Financial Market (66%), Borse Dubai (33%)
- Key people: Abdul Wahed Al Fahim (Chairman), Hamed Ali (CEO)
- Indices: DFM General (DFMGI)
- Website: www.nasdaqdubai.com

Nasdaq Dubai is a Dubai-based stock exchange that lists regional and international shares in the Middle East. Through the exchange, regional issuers can access regional and international investment. International issuers can access investment from the region, through a primary or dual listing.

The NASDAQ Dubai region includes the United Arab Emirates and the rest of the Gulf Cooperation Council (GCC), the wider Middle East and North Africa, Turkey and the Indian sub-continent.

The majority shareholder of NASDAQ Dubai is DFM, which acquired two thirds of the shares in May 2010 from Borse Dubai and NASDAQ OMX Group. Borse Dubai still owns one third of the shares.

NASDAQ Dubai is located in the Dubai International Financial Centre, a financial free zone. The exchange is regulated by the Dubai Financial Services Authority.

== History ==
The exchange launched on 26 September 2005 under the name Dubai International Financial Exchange (DIFX), which initially listed equities and index products.

In 2007, the exchange listed the largest IPO in the Middle East, when DP World raised US$4.96 billion.

In 2008, NASDAQ OMX acquired a one-third stake in the DIFX and it rebranded to NASDAQ Dubai. The other two-thirds was owned by Borse Dubai, the holding company of NASDAQ Dubai and Dubai Financial Market (DFM).

In 2008, NASDAQ Dubai launched the first equity derivatives market in the United Arab Emirates.

In 2010, the exchange took a step towards creating a single regional liquidity pool by moving all its equities trading on to DFM's trading platform. The same year DFM acquired a two-thirds stake in NASDAQ Dubai, with Borse Dubai retaining a one-third stake.

In 2011, the exchange transferred its Listing Authority from its own control to that of the Dubai Financial Services Authority.

In 2012, the DFSA reduced the minimum market capitalisation for companies to list to US$10 million, from US$50 million previously. This change has opened the door to listings by small and medium-sized enterprises, including family owned businesses.

In 2013, the exchange launched a fixed income trading platform, allowing investors to trade Sukuk and conventional bonds on-exchange.

In October 2013, the Bank of London and The Middle East (BLME) listed its shares on the exchange.

In April 2014, Emirates REIT listed its shares following its IPO, in the first listing of a Real Estate Investment Trust (REIT) on an exchange in the GCC. Emirates REIT raised 201 million dollars and was 3.5 times oversubscribed.

In the same month, the exchange launched an Islamic financing Murabaha platform. This offers an alternative to many traditional Murabaha solutions, which can carry a risk of losses through price movements, spreads and poor liquidity as well as delays.

In June 2014, NASDAQ Dubai had 28 current Sukuk listings with a total nominal value of US$18.3 billion, which made Dubai (NASDAQ Dubai plus DFM) the third largest venue in the world for Sukuk listings.

== Listed securities ==
Products listed on NASDAQ Dubai include ordinary shares listed by DP World. DP World was the largest IPO in the Middle East raising $4.96 billion until Saudi Aramco's IPO. It was 15x oversubscribed and is one of the most valued companies in the region.

In 2014, Emirates REIT carried out an IPO on the exchange, becoming the first Real Estate Investment Trust to list in the GCC.

The exchange is the third largest in the world for listed Sukuk by value and conventional bonds are also listed. Equity derivatives can be traded. The exchange operates a Murabaha platform for Islamic financing.

== Trading hours ==
The trading hours of NASDAQ Dubai are from 10:00 am to 3:00 pm (06:00 am to 11:00 am GMT) from Monday to Friday.

== The Dubai International Financial Centre ==
NASDAQ Dubai is located in the Dubai International Financial Centre (DIFC), a financial free zone which opened for business in 2004. Financial activities in the DIFC are governed to international standards by an independent regulator, the Dubai Financial Services Authority. NASDAQ Dubai has a licence from the DFSA to operate an exchange. The President of the DIFC is Sheikh Mohammed bin Rashid Al Maktoum, the UAE Vice President, Prime Minister and Ruler of Dubai.

== The Dubai Financial Services Authority ==
NASDAQ Dubai is regulated by the Dubai Financial Services Authority, this structure falls into a number of different categories:

- Rules which regulate the process which companies must follow if they wish to have their securities admitted to trading on the market operated by NASDAQ Dubai.
- Rules which regulate the obligations of companies after their securities have been admitted to trading (e.g., continuous disclosure rules) – also covered by the Issuers and Securities Rules
- Rules which regulate the process which an entity must follow in order to become a Member of NASDAQ Dubai.
- Rules which regulate the behaviour of Members on the market operated by NASDAQ Dubai and the obligations which Members owe to their clients – also covered by the Business Rules.
- Rules which regulate Clearing and Settlement procedures are covered by the NASDAQ Dubai Business Rules.

== See also ==
- Abu Dhabi Securities Exchange - stock market for UAE companies
- Dubai Financial Market - stock market also for UAE companies
- List of stock exchanges - stock exchanges around the world
- List of Online Stock Brokers
