= National Bonds Corporation =

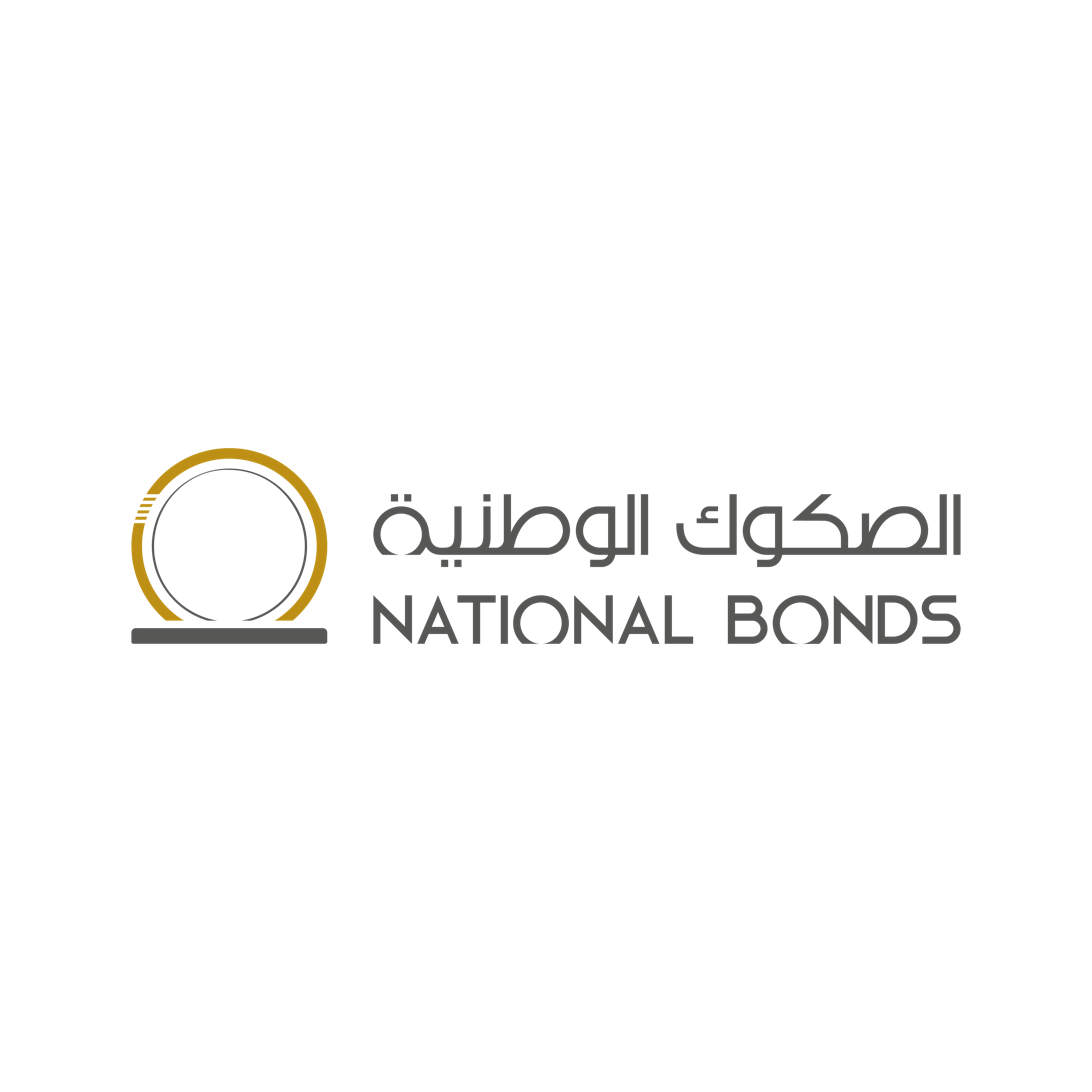
- Company type: Private company
- Industry: Financial services
- Founded: March 2006; 19 years ago
- Headquarters: Dubai, United Arab Emirates
- Area served: UAE
- Products: Investments
- Owner: Investment Corporation of Dubai
- Website: www.nationalbonds.ae

National Bonds Corporation (known as National Bonds) is a Dubai-based savings and investment company in the UAE. It is a private joint-stock shareholding company, established in March 2006. It is owned by The Investment Corporation of Dubai. National Bonds is Shari’a compliant and regulated financial institution.

== See also ==
- Economy of the United Arab Emirates
