= Borse Dubai =

Stock exchange in United Arab Emirates

Borse Dubai is a stock exchange in the United Arab Emirates.

It is the holding company for Dubai Financial Market (DFM) and NASDAQ Dubai (formerly known as DIFX). Borse Dubai was created 6 August 2007 to consolidate the Government of Dubai's two stock exchanges as well as current investments in other exchanges, expanding Dubai's position as a global capital market hub.

Borse Dubai's growth mandate is extracted from the 2015 Dubai Strategic Plan which has defined financial services and capital markets as a key focus area to support the development and growth of regional capital markets to the highest international standards. This is complemented with Dubai's strong heritage of building global leaders in selected industries.

In September 2007, Borse Dubai secured 28% of London Stock Exchange Group as part of a wider deal with the US-based Nasdaq, Inc. designed to settle their long-running battle for control of the Stockholm-based exchange and telecommunications operator OMX. However, the move enraged the Qatar Investment Authority, which believed it was close to clinching a deal to buy much of the LSE stake for itself. Following completion of the Nasdaq OMX deal, Borse Dubai's holding of Nasdaq's common stock is 18.1%. It has obtained a license from the U.S. Congress to do so, as well as being approved by the U.S. Securities and Exchange Commission.
