= Ryan Cornelius =

British property developer (born 1954)

- Born: Ryan Cornelius; 1954 (age 71–72)
- Status: Incarcerated
- Occupation: Property developer
- Known for: Detention in the United Arab Emirates since 2008; UN finding of arbitrary detention
- Criminal charge: Fraud
- Criminal penalty: Prison sentence

Ryan Cornelius (born 1954) is a British property developer who has been detained in the United Arab Emirates since 2008. In 2011, he was convicted alongside three co-defendants in connection with a US$501 million loan from Dubai Islamic Bank (DIB) and sentenced to ten years' imprisonment. Cornelius has disputed the allegations against him, and in 2025 the European Parliament described his conviction as being based on "false fraud charges related to a loan from Dubai Islamic Bank".

Shortly before Cornelius was due to complete his original sentence in 2018, a Dubai court extended his imprisonment by a further 20 years under Dubai Law No. 37 of 2009 in connection with an alleged outstanding debt.

In 2022, the United Nations Working Group on Arbitrary Detention found Cornelius's detention to be arbitrary and called for his immediate release and compensation. In July 2026, a group of UN human-rights experts again called for his immediate release, saying that the proceedings leading to the additional 20 years had been "marred by serious judicial irregularities".

== Legal case ==
Cornelius was detained in 2008 in connection with financing provided by Dubai Islamic Bank for a property-development project. The 2022 opinion of the United Nations Working Group on Arbitrary Detention recorded a submission that the judge originally presiding over the proceedings said in 2010 that he was unable to convict Cornelius and his co-defendants of fraud on the evidence presented, recused himself, and indicated that there should instead be further investigation of "more senior Dubai Islamic Bank executives who are not on trial".

A different judge subsequently convicted Cornelius of embezzlement of state funds in April 2011 and sentenced him to ten years' imprisonment, alongside an order to repay US$501 million and a further US$500 million fine. The Working Group noted that the subsequent hearings had been "extremely brief", that Cornelius's lawyer had not been permitted to question or cross-examine witnesses, and that the identity of the original complainant had not been disclosed. It concluded that the brevity of the proceedings suggested that Cornelius's guilt had been predetermined and found serious violations of his fair-trial rights.

In 2018, shortly before Cornelius was due to complete his original sentence, his imprisonment was extended by a further 20 years under Dubai Law No. 37 of 2009 in connection with an alleged outstanding debt. The UN opinion recorded a submission that the additional detention had been imposed "at the behest of Dubai Islamic Bank" and found that Cornelius had received no prior notice, legal representation or opportunity to make submissions at the closed-door proceeding.

UN experts stated in 2026 that civil proceedings in Bahrain had reportedly found in 2020 that assets and payments transferred to the lender had fully discharged Cornelius's indebtedness and exceeded the amount due. The European Parliament likewise noted in 2025 that assets valued at more than twice the original debt had been seized.

== International response ==
Cornelius has maintained that the Dubai Islamic Bank facility financed a legitimate property-development business, rather than a fraud, and that repayments were being met at the time of his 2008 arrest; his account, set out in a 2024 House of Commons debate and a 2025 European Parliament resolution, states that he was held in solitary confinement for about six weeks after his arrest without access to legal counsel.

=== United Nations ===
On 1 April 2022, the United Nations Working Group on Arbitrary Detention adopted Opinion No. 19/2022, finding that Cornelius' deprivation of liberty was arbitrary under its categories I and III and that it breached eight articles of the Universal Declaration of Human Rights (articles 2, 3, 6, 7, 8, 9, 10 and 11). The Working Group held that the appropriate remedy was to release Cornelius immediately and to accord him an enforceable right to compensation and other reparations, and it called for a full and independent investigation into his detention.

On 24 July 2026, seven UN human-rights experts again called for Cornelius's immediate release. They said that he had completed his original sentence in 2018 but remained imprisoned following a 20-year extension imposed in proceedings "marred by serious judicial irregularities", and reiterated that his detention had already been found arbitrary by the Working Group. The experts stated that international human-rights law rejects imprisonment as a means of enforcing a civil debt and noted that Bahrain civil proceedings had reportedly found that assets and payments transferred to the lender had fully discharged the debt and exceeded the amount due. Citing Cornelius's age, deteriorating health, inadequate medical care and prison conditions, they warned that urgent action was required to prevent irreparable harm.

=== European Parliament ===
On 10 July 2025, the European Parliament adopted a resolution on Cornelius's case by 511 votes to 50, with 75 abstentions, calling for his immediate and unconditional release. The resolution described his conviction as being based on "false fraud charges related to a loan from Dubai Islamic Bank" and cited the UN Working Group's findings concerning lack of due process, coerced confessions, solitary confinement, denial of legal counsel and the coerced signing of documents in Arabic.

The Parliament denounced the 2018 extension as a retroactive application of Dubai Law No. 37 of 2009, noted that the law exempts convicted debtors aged over 70 from imprisonment, and stated that assets valued at more than twice Cornelius's original debt had been seized. It called on the United Kingdom to take all necessary action to secure his release and demanded that he be granted an enforceable right to compensation.

=== United Kingdom ===
A House of Commons adjournment debate on Cornelius's detention was held on 19 November 2024. British parliamentarians have subsequently made repeated calls for stronger government action in his case, including the use of targeted sanctions.

In March 2025, a cross-party group of 40 British parliamentarians called for sanctions designations in connection with Cornelius's detention. During a House of Commons debate on 8 January 2026, Sir Iain Duncan Smith urged the government to impose targeted Magnitsky sanctions on individuals he alleged were responsible for Cornelius's arbitrary detention and asset seizure, specifically naming then-DIB chairman Mohammed Ibrahim Al Shaibani and other members of the bank's board.

On 14 September 2026, Duncan Smith tabled further parliamentary questions asking the government to publicly call for Cornelius's immediate release, whether the Prime Minister intended to raise his detention directly with the UAE Foreign Minister, and whether the government's Special Envoy for Complex Detention Cases would demand his release.

== See also ==
- Dubai Islamic Bank
