= Dubai Islamic Bank =

Emirari islamic bank

- Type: Public bank
- Traded as: DFM: DIB
- ISIN: AED000201015
- Industry: Islamic banking and finance
- Founded: 15 September 1975; 51 years ago
- Headquarters: Dubai, United Arab Emirates
- Key people: Mohammed Ibrahim Al Shaibani (Chairman); Adnan Chilwan (Group CEO)
- Products: Retail banking, Corporate banking, Investment banking
- Revenue: AED 7,8 billion (2025) (USD 2,12 billion)
- Operating income: AED 23 billion (2025) (USD 6,48 billion)
- Total assets: AED 415 billion (2025) (USD 113 billion)
- Total equity: AED 53 billion (2025) (USD 14,46 billion)
- Number of employees: Approximately 10,000
- Website: www.dib.ae

Dubai Islamic Bank (DIB; Arabic: بنك دبي الإسلامي) is a major Islamic bank headquartered in Dubai, United Arab Emirates. Established in 1975 by Saeed bin Ahmed Lootah, it is the country's second largest lender. The bank follows Sharia principles across all its activities and is the largest Islamic bank in the United Arab Emirates by assets.

Dubai Islamic Bank is a public joint-stock company listed on the Dubai Financial Market.

DIB was ranked 13th on Forbes Middle East's 30 Most Valuable Banks 2025 list. It also ranked 22nd on Forbes Middle East's Top 100 Listed Companies 2025 list.

== History ==
The bank was founded in 1975 to offer Islamic banking services.

In January 2020, DIB acquired Noor Bank.

== Operations ==
The bank's activities include retail banking, corporate banking, and SME banking, as well as trade finance, treasury services, and investment banking-related products.

=== International presence ===
- Bosnia and Herzegovina: Bosna Bank International – An Islamic bank established in 2000 in Sarajevo, Bosnia and Herzegovina.
- Indonesia: Panin Dubai Syariah Bank – A minority shareholding in an Indonesian Islamic bank.
- Kenya: Licensed by the Central Bank of Kenya.
- Pakistan: A wholly owned subsidiary established in 2006.
- Sudan: (Bank of Khartoum), A strategic shareholding in one of Sudan's largest banks.

=== Subsidiaries ===
- Dar Al Sharia – A Sharia legal and financial advisory firm established in 2008.
- Deyaar Development – A real estate development company based in the United Arab Emirates.

== Financial performance ==
In 2024, Dubai Islamic Bank reported revenues of approximately US$6.3 billion and total assets of approximately US$94 billion.

== Legal cases and controversies ==
=== Ryan Cornelius case ===
Dubai Islamic Bank has been involved in a long-running legal dispute concerning British businessman Ryan Cornelius, who has been imprisoned in Dubai since 2008. In 2025, the European Parliament described his conviction as being based on "false fraud charges related to a loan from Dubai Islamic Bank" and called for his immediate release.

The 2022 United Nations Working Group on Arbitrary Detention opinion recorded that the judge originally hearing the case said he was unable to convict Cornelius on the evidence presented and called instead for further investigation of "more senior Dubai Islamic Bank executives who are not on trial". Cornelius was later convicted before a different judge following what the Working Group described as an "extremely brief" trial; it concluded that his guilt appeared to have been predetermined and found serious violations of his fair-trial rights.

Shortly before Cornelius was due to complete his original sentence in 2018, his imprisonment was extended by a further 20 years under Dubai Law No. 37 of 2009. The UN opinion recorded a submission that the additional sentence was imposed "at the behest of Dubai Islamic Bank" and found that Cornelius had received no prior notice, legal representation or opportunity to make submissions at the closed-door proceeding. The Working Group found his detention arbitrary and called for his immediate release and compensation. It also recorded that civil proceedings in Bahrain had reportedly found that Cornelius's indebtedness to DIB had already been discharged.

In July 2026, seven UN human-rights experts again called for Cornelius's immediate release, describing the proceedings that produced the 20-year extension as "marred by serious judicial irregularities" and noting that the Bahrain proceedings had reportedly found that assets and payments transferred to the lender had fully discharged the debt and exceeded the amount due.

The case has also prompted calls in the Parliament of the United Kingdom for targeted sanctions against DIB officials. In March 2025, a cross-party group of British parliamentarians urged the UK government to impose Magnitsky sanctions in connection with Cornelius's case, including against then-DIB chairman Mohammed Ibrahim Al Shaibani and other bank officials over their alleged role in his continued detention and the seizure of his assets.

Al Shaibani resigned as chairman and a member of DIB's board in September 2026, shortly after leaving his role as Director General of the Dubai Ruler's Court.

DIB has rejected allegations that it is responsible for Cornelius's imprisonment, stating that sentencing is a matter for the UAE judicial system.

== See also ==
- Bank Syariah Indonesia
- Alrajhi Bank
