= Economy of the United Arab Emirates =

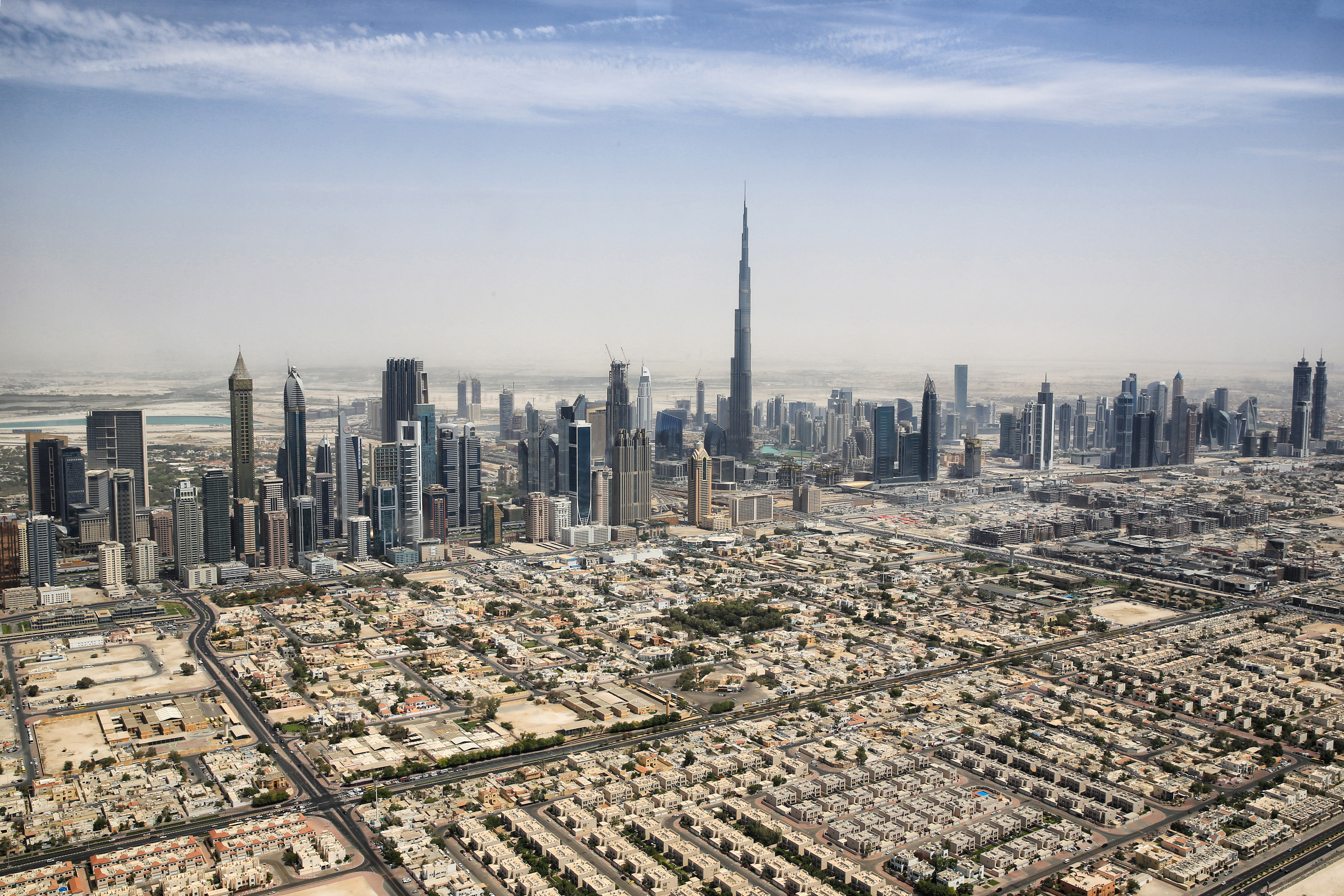
- Dubai, the economic center of the UAE
- Currency: Emirati dirham (AED, د.إ,)
- Fixed exchange rates: US$1 = 3.6725 AED
- Fiscal year: Calendar year
- Trade organisations: UNCTAD, WTO, GCC, BRICS
- Country group: Developing/Emerging; High-income economy; Commodity-reliant economy, diversifying economy

Statistics
- Population: ▲9,441,129 (2022)
- GDP: ▲$621.54 billion (nominal; 2026 est.); ▲$1.006 trillion (PPP; 2026 est.)
- GDP rank: 29th (nominal; 2024); 34th (PPP; 2024)
- GDP growth: ▲7.51% (2022); ▼3.62% (2023e); ▲4.01% (2024f)
- GDP per capita: ▲$54,214 (nominal; 2026 est.); ▲$87,774 (PPP; 2026 est.)
- GDP per capita rank: 19th (nominal; 2024); 5th (PPP; 2024)
- GDP per capita growth: ▼ -0.8% (2024)
- GDP by sector: Agriculture: 0.9%; Industry: 49.8%; Services: 49.2%; (2017 est.)
- Inflation (CPI): ▼1.62% (2023 est.)
- Population below national poverty line: N/A
- Gini coefficient: 26.0 low (2018)
- Human Development Index: ▲0.940 very high (2023) (27th); ▲0.866 very high IHDI (16th) (2023)
- Labour force: ▲6,668,172 (2023); 78.3% employment rate (2019); expatriates account for about 85% of the workforce
- Labour force by occupation: Agriculture: 7%; Industry: 15%; Services: 78%; (2000 est.)
- Unemployment: ▲3.36% (2021)
- Youth unemployment: ▲6.5% (2025)
- Main industries: Petroleum; petrochemicals; fishing; aluminum; cement; fertilizer; ship repair; construction; materials; handicrafts; textiles

External
- Exports: ▲$306.41 billion (2020 est.)
- Export goods: Crude oil, refined petroleum, gold, reexports, telecommunications equipment, diamonds, petroleum gas, jewellery, aluminium (2021)
- Main export partners: GCC 15.0%; Saudi Arabia 7.5%; Oman 3.8%; Kuwait 1.6%; Bahrain 1.3%; Qatar 0.8%; India 14.2%; Japan 8.3%; China 7.7%; Iraq 4.8% (2021)
- Imports: ▲$229.2 billion (2017 est.)
- Import goods: Gold, food, machinery, transport vehicles and parts, refined petroleum, natural gas, diamonds, jewellery, refined copper (2021)
- Main import partners: China 17.3%; European Union 13.0%; Germany 3.1%; Italy 2.3%; France 1.8%; Belgium 1.4%; Netherlands 1.0%; (European Union) Other EU 3.4%; GCC 9.5%; Saudi Arabia 5.2%; Oman 1.5%; Qatar 1.2%; Bahrain 1.0%; Kuwait 0.6%; India 9.4%; United States 5.5% (2021)
- FDI stock: ▼$129.9 billion (2017 est.); ▲ Abroad: $124.4 billion (2017 est.)
- Current account: ▲$26.47 billion (2017 est.)
- Gross external debt: ▲$237.6 billion (2017 est.)

Public finance
- Government debt: ▼38.33% of GDP (2020 est.)
- Foreign reserves: ▲$95.37 billion (2017 est.)
- Budget balance: −0.2% (of GDP) (2017 est.)
- Revenue: 15.79 billion (2021 est.)
- Spending: 16.6 billion (2021 est.) (Note: the UAE federal budget does not account for emirate-level spending in Abu Dhabi and Dubai)
- Credit rating: Standard & Poor's: AA; Outlook: Stable; Moody's: Aa2; Outlook: Stable; Fitch: AA; Outlook: Stable
- All values, unless otherwise stated, are in US dollars.

The United Arab Emirates is a high-income developing market economy (Open market economy), which also advocates for Islamic economics. Its economy is the fourth-largest in the Middle East (after Turkey, Saudi Arabia and Israel), with a gross domestic product (GDP) of US$415 billion (AED 1.83 trillion) in 2021–2023.

The country's economy is reliant on revenues from hydrocarbons, especially in Abu Dhabi. In 2009, more than 85% of the UAE's economy was based on the oil exports. In 2011, oil exports accounted for 77% of the UAE's state budget. In recent years, there has been some economic diversification, particularly in Dubai. Abu Dhabi and other UAE emirates have remained relatively conservative in their approach to diversification. Dubai has far smaller oil reserves than its counterparts.

Hospitality is one of the biggest non-commodity sources of revenue in the UAE. In 2007, there was US$350 billion worth of active construction projects. The UAE is a member of the UNCTAD and World Trade Organization.

== Economic overview ==
UAE has the second-largest economy in the Arab world, with a gross domestic product (GDP) of US$414 billion (AED 1.52 trillion) in 2018. A third of the GDP is from oil revenues. The economy was expected to grow 4–4.5% in 2013, compared to 2.3–3.5% over the previous five years. Since independence in 1971, UAE's economy has grown by nearly 231 times to AED1.45 trillion in 2013. The non-oil trade has grown to AED1.2 trillion, a growth of around 28 times from 1981 to 2012.

The UAE's economy is one of the most open worldwide, and its economic history goes back to the times when ships sailed to India, along the Swahili coast, as far south as Mozambique.

The UAE economy has been ‘inspected’ by international economic institutions on a regular basis, generally receiving good reports on economic developments. International Monetary Fund (IMF) expected UAE's economic growth to increase to 4.5% in 2015, compared to 4.3% in 2014. The IMF ascribed UAE's potentially strong economic growth in World Economic Outlook Report to the increased contribution of non-petroleum sectors, which registered a growth average of more than 6% in 2014 and 2015. Such contribution includes banking, tourism, commerce and real estate. Increase of Emirati purchasing power and governmental expenditures in infrastructure projects have considerably increased.

Internationally, UAE is ranked among the top 20 for global service business, according to AT Kearney, the top 30 on the WEF "most-networked countries" and in the top quarter as a least corrupt country per the TI's corruption index.

The government of the United Arab Emirates announced a broad restructuring and merger of more than 50% of its federal agencies, including ministries and departments, in an attempt to deal with and recover from the economic shocks following months-long coronavirus lockdown.

UAE stock markets lost approximately $120 billion in market capitalization following the outbreak of the 2026 Iran war. The Dubai Financial Market declined by around 16%, while the Abu Dhabi Securities Exchange fell by approximately 9%, according to Al Jazeera reporting. Despite the economic impact of the war, Fitch Ratings has reaffirmed the economy's outlook as stable, underscoring its ability to withstand external shocks. The credit rating was confirmed by Moody's assessment of the UAE economy as diversified, with a low debt and strong net external asset position.

The 2026 Iran war placed additional pressure on the UAE's position as a regional financial and business hub. Following Iranian attacks, some wealthy investors considered transferring assets from Dubai to financial centres such as Singapore and Switzerland, amid concerns about the country's security and investment environment. On the Dubai Financial Market, foreign investors' net flows shifted from an inflow of $890 million between the beginning of the year and 26 February to an outflow of $853 million by 12 June. The conflict also disrupted tourism and air travel, with flight suspensions and cancellations affecting the sector. In response, Dubai authorities pledged a 2.5 billion dirham ($681 million) support package, focused mainly on tourism and retail. However, some wealth managers reported that investors were diversifying their assets rather than leaving the UAE entirely.

== Historical background ==
Before independence from the United Kingdom and unification in 1971, each emirate was responsible for its own economy. At the time, pearl diving, seafaring and fishing were together the mainstay of the economy, until the development of Japanese cultured pearls and the discovery of commercial quantities of oil. Previous UAE President Zayed Bin Sultan Al Nahyan is credited with bringing the country forward into the 20th century and using the revenue from oil exports to fund all the necessary development. Likewise, former UAE vice-president Rashid bin Saeed Al Maktoum had a bold vision for the Emirate of Dubai and foresaw the future in not petroleum alone, but also other industries.

In the 1980s, Dubai's diversification centred around trade and the creation of shipping and logistics centres, notably Port Rashid and the port and Free Zone of Jebel Ali as well as Dubai International Airport, leading to a number of major global plays in shipping, transportation and logistics (DP World, Emirates, DNATA).

=== 2008-present ===
The emergence of Dubai's lively real estate market was briefly stopped by the 2008 financial crisis, when Dubai was bailed out by Abu Dhabi. The recovery from the overheated market led to tighter regulation and oversight and a more realistic market for real estate throughout the UAE with many 'on hold' projects restarting. Although the market continues to expand, current market conditions for developers have been characterised as 'tough'.

In 2010, a long-term strategic plan known as "UAE Vision 2021" was launched that focused on economic diversification, social cohesion and sustainable growth.

As a result of the COVID-19 pandemic in the United Arab Emirates, the UAE's economy shrank by 6.1% in 2020. The country's account balance dropped to six per cent of GDP in 2020 from 8.5 per cent in 2019 due to the underperformance of both hydrocarbon and non-hydrocarbon exports mitigated by lower imports.

In late 2021, the authority announced that UAE's banking assets are expected to grow by between 8 per cent and 10 per cent in 2022 as the second-biggest Arab economy continues to recover from the COVID-19 pandemic. It was also announced the UAE's economy might grow at a faster than projected rate, reaching 4.6% in 2022.

In March 2022, the UAE was put in the “gray list” by the Financial Action Task Force (FATF) over money laundering and terror financing concerns. In February 2024, the country was successfully removed from the watchlist and escaped the FATF's monitoring process. While the global watchdog said the Emirates addressed the shortcomings, critics argued that the move was driven by political considerations. In December 2022, the European Commission added the UAE to its blacklist over illicit financial flows. In January 2025, the UAE Economy Minister Abdulla bin Touq Al Marri criticized the EU for continuing to consider the country on its blacklist, despite its removal from the FATF's “gray list”. In July 2025, the European Parliament approved the European Commission's updated money laundering blacklist that removed the UAE, despite earlier opposition from the MEPs. Transparency International, along with lawmaker and civil society groups, criticized the Parliament's decision, saying it is premature to judge if the UAE's reforms are effective and that the decision appears to be politically motivated.

In November 2022, a 10-year national strategic plan known as "We the UAE 2031" was launched that focused on development across social, economic, investment and digital sectors.

== Diversification of the UAE's economy ==
Although the UAE has the most diversified economy in the GCC, the UAE's economy remains extremely reliant on oil. With the exception of Dubai, most of the UAE is dependent on oil revenues. Petroleum and natural gas continue to play a central role in the economy, especially in Abu Dhabi. More than 85% of the UAE's economy was based on the oil exports in 2009. While Abu Dhabi and other UAE emirates have remained relatively conservative in their approach to diversification, Dubai, which has far smaller oil reserves, was bolder in its diversification policy. In 2011, oil exports accounted for 77% of the UAE's state budget.

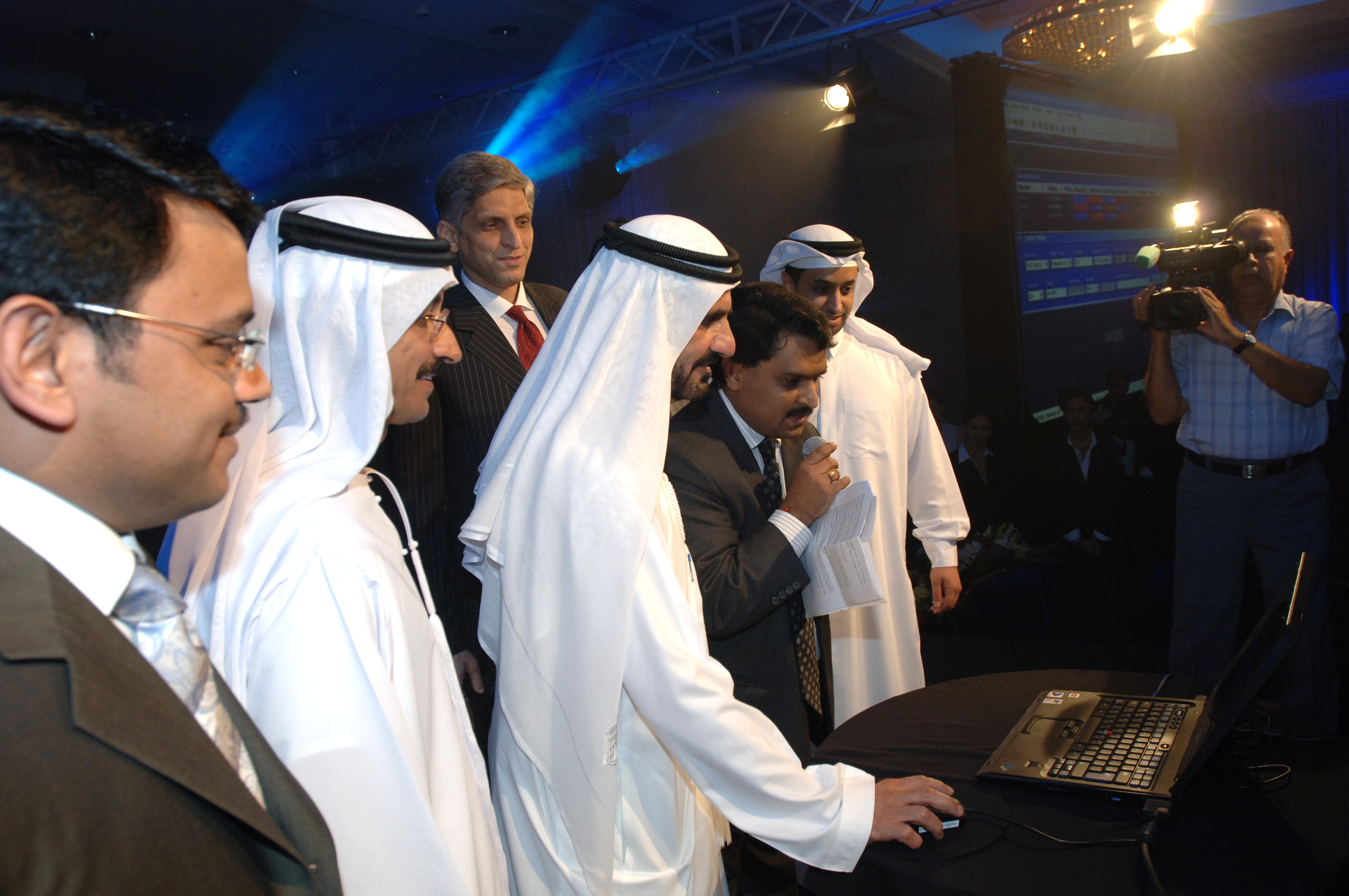
Inauguration of the Dubai Gold & Commodities Exchange in 2005 by UAE Prime Minister Mohammed bin Rashid Al Maktoum and DP World CEO Sultan Ahmed bin Sulayem

Dubai suffered from a significant economic crisis in 2007–2010, with its housing market in crisis and was bailed out by Abu Dhabi's oil wealth. Dubai's current prosperity has been attributed to Abu Dhabi's petrodollars. In 2014, Dubai owed a total of $142 billion in debt.

The UAE government has worked towards reducing the economy's dependence on oil exports by 2030. Various projects are underway to help achieve this, the most recent being the Khalifa Port, opened in the Emirate of Abu Dhabi at the end of 2012. The UAE also won the right to host the World Expo 2020, which is believed to have a positive effect on future growth, although there are some skeptics which mention the opposite.

Over the decades, the Emirate of Dubai has started to look for additional sources of revenue. High-class tourism and international finance continue to be developed. In line with this initiative, the Dubai International Financial Centre was announced, offering 55.5% foreign ownership, no withholding tax, freehold land and office space and a tailor-made financial regulatory system with laws taken from best practice in other leading financial centers, like New York, London, Zürich and Singapore. A new stock market for regional companies and other initiatives was announced in DIFC. Dubai has also developed Internet and Media free zones, offering 100% foreign ownership, no tax office space for the world's leading ICT and media companies, with the latest communications infrastructure to service them. In 2020, the UAE established the Ministry of State for Artificial Intelligence, Digital Economy and Remote Work Applications, as part of the UAE's efforts to foster economic diversification and adapt to a globalized economy.

Many of the world's leading companies have now set up branch offices, and even changed headquarters to Dubai. Recent liberalization in the property market allowing non-citizens to buy freehold land has resulted in a major boom in the construction and real estate sectors, with several signature developments, such as the 2 Palm Islands, the World (archipelago), Dubai Marina, Jumeirah Lake Towers, and a number of other developments, offering villas and high rise apartments and office space. Emirates (part of the Emirates Group) was formed by the Dubai Government in the 1980s and is presently one of the few airlines to witness strong levels of growth. Emirates is also the largest operator of the Airbus A380 aircraft. As of 2001, budgeted government revenues were about AED 29.7 billion, and expenditures were about AED 22.9 billion. In addition, to finding new ways of sustaining the national economy, the UAE has also made progress in installing new, sustainable methods of generating electricity. This is evidenced by various solar energy initiatives at Masdar City and by other renewable energy developments in parts of the country.

In addition, the UAE is starting to see the emergence of local manufacturing as a new source of economic development. Examples of significant government-led investments, such as Strata in the aerospace industry, under Mubadala, are successful, while there are also small scale entrepreneurial ventures picking up, such as Zarooq Motors in the automotive industry.

In August 2020, the Barakah nuclear power plant, the first nuclear power plant in the Arab world, became operational.

In its hard push for economic diversification, the UAE had been increasing its presence in Africa. One of the areas of interest had been clean energy, for which Abu Dhabi's Masdar built infrastructure, including five wind farms in South Africa, a battery energy storage system in Senegal and solar power facilities in Mauritania. Emirati companies were also investing in fossil fuels, where ADNOC purchased 10% stakes in Mozambique’s Rovuma gas basin. UAE’s e& also established a foothold in around 12 countries across Africa. The Emirati companies also entered the mining sector, where Tahnoun bin Zayed’s International Holding Company expressed investment interests in mines in Kenya, Tanzania and Angola. However, certain investments had also been controversial. Tanzanian authorities were alleged of forcing several Maasai off their land for a safari and hunting project of an Emirati firm. A Dubai-based firm, Blue Carbon, signed preliminary agreements in Liberia, Tanzania, Kenya, Zambia and Zimbabwe, aiming to generate carbon credits. However, it was accused of attempting to acquire millions of hectares of African forests in a greenwashing attempt. Meanwhile, DP World also invested around $3bn in Africa, and operates ports from Mozambique in the south to Algeria in the north and Angola on the Atlantic. The Emirates had also been alleged of controversial actions in the war zones in Africa, including in Libya and Sudan.

The UAE targeted another major milestone in its diversification plans, as it granted a “Commercial Gaming Facility Operator” license to Wynn Resorts in October 2024. Wynn is developing a $3.9 billion integrated resort, Wynn Al Marjan Island, in Ras Al Khaimah, which will also include a 224,000 sq. ft. casino component. Set to open in 2027, the project aims at targeting foreign tourists and boosting tourism. Although the UAE established the General Commercial Gaming Regulatory Authority (GCGRA) in September 2023, it has no laws that legalize gambling or its tools and machines. Gambling remains a cultural taboo and illegal for local citizens. Despite the casino facility being constructed in the Emirates, project operators and insiders avoided talking publicly about it.

== Economic sectors ==
=== Agriculture ===
Agriculture in the United Arab Emirates, including fishing, was a minor part of the UAE economy in the early 1990s, contributing less than 4 percent of GDP. Since the formation of the UAE, the availability of capital and the demand for fresh produce have encouraged agricultural development. The main farming areas are Digdaga in Ras al-Khaimah. Falaj al Mualla in Umm al Qawain, Wadi adh Dhayd in Sharjah, Al Awir in Dubai and the coastal area of Al Fujairah. Total cultivable land was around 70,000 hectares as of the early 1990s.

In the early 1990s, these sectors contributed less than 2% to the nation's Gross Domestic Product (GDP). By 2023, the combined value added by agriculture, forestry, and fishing had declined to approximately 0.7% of GDP.

=== Energy ===
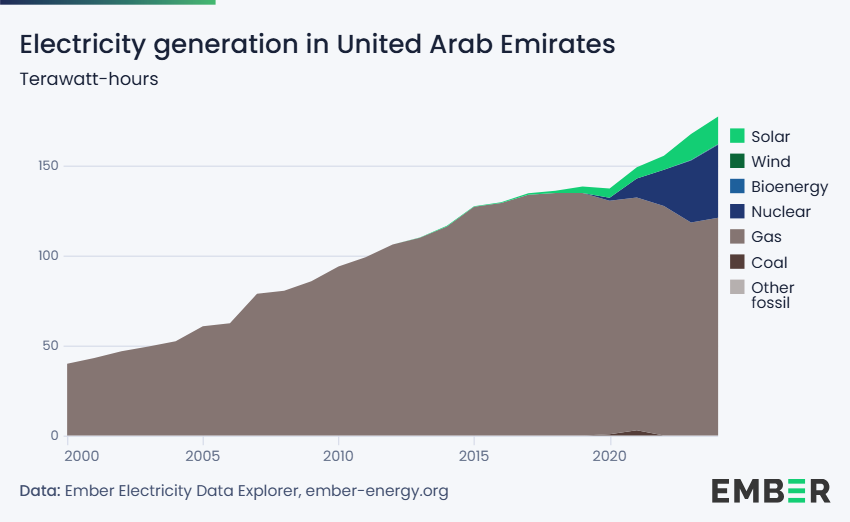
Electricity generation in the United Arab Emirates in terawatt-hours

Energy in the United Arab Emirates describes energy and electricity production, consumption and import in the United Arab Emirates (UAE). The UAE has 7% of global proved oil reserves, about 100 billion barrels. Primary energy usage in 2009 in the UAE was 693 TWh and 151 TWh per million persons.

In 2024, fossil fuels, primarily natural gas, accounted for about 75% of the UAE's electricity capacity, while the remainder came from nuclear and solar energy sources.

=== Banking and finance ===
On 19 June 2020, rating agency Moody's changed its outlook regarding eight banks in the United Arab Emirates from stable to negative. The change was due to "the potential material weakening in their standalone credit profiles", where the UAE's economy was facing additional challenges amidst the COVID-19 pandemic and low oil prices. The eight banks included Abu Dhabi Commercial Bank, Emirates NBD, HSBC Bank Middle East, Dubai Islamic Bank, Abu Dhabi Islamic Bank, National Bank of Fujairah, National Bank of Ras al-Khaimah and Mashreq Bank.

The Fitch Ratings in its 22 June 2020 report predicted that the Standalone Credit Profiles of UAE-based banks are to possibly weaken in the following year due to the COVID-19 pandemic and oil price collapse. As per the Fitch report, despite the implementation of timely measures for supporting the economy, the profitability of banks in the UAE are prone to get affected by a lower non-interest income worsened by a controlled business volume, lower interest rates, and higher loan recovery charges. In addition, the asset quality is expected to weaken, too, following the unbearable impact of the economic downturn that all borrowers may not be able to withstand.

In 2026, Moody's banking outlook for the United Arab Emirates was upgraded to positive, reflecting the "UAE’s ongoing economic diversification efforts and structural reforms within the banking system."

Among the most prominent financial centers in the UAE are:

- Dubai International Financial Center (DIFC), a Dubai-based federal financial free zone
- Abu Dhabi Global Market (ADGM), an international financial centre located on Al Maryah Island

==== Fintech ====
The UAE is one of the leading countries in the financial technology - FinTech - sector, with the Dubai International Financial Centre (DIFC) and Abu Dhabi Global Market (ADGM) hosting hundreds of companies. The sector is expected to reach USD 5.71 billion by 2029. Much of the sector's expansion is credited to the accessible regulatory framework that fosters competition and innovation. The Dubai Multi Commodities Centre (DMCC) and Hong Kong regulators are expected to implement an agreement allowing an accelerated and streamlined relocation process for senior executives working in fintech companies.

=== Real estate ===
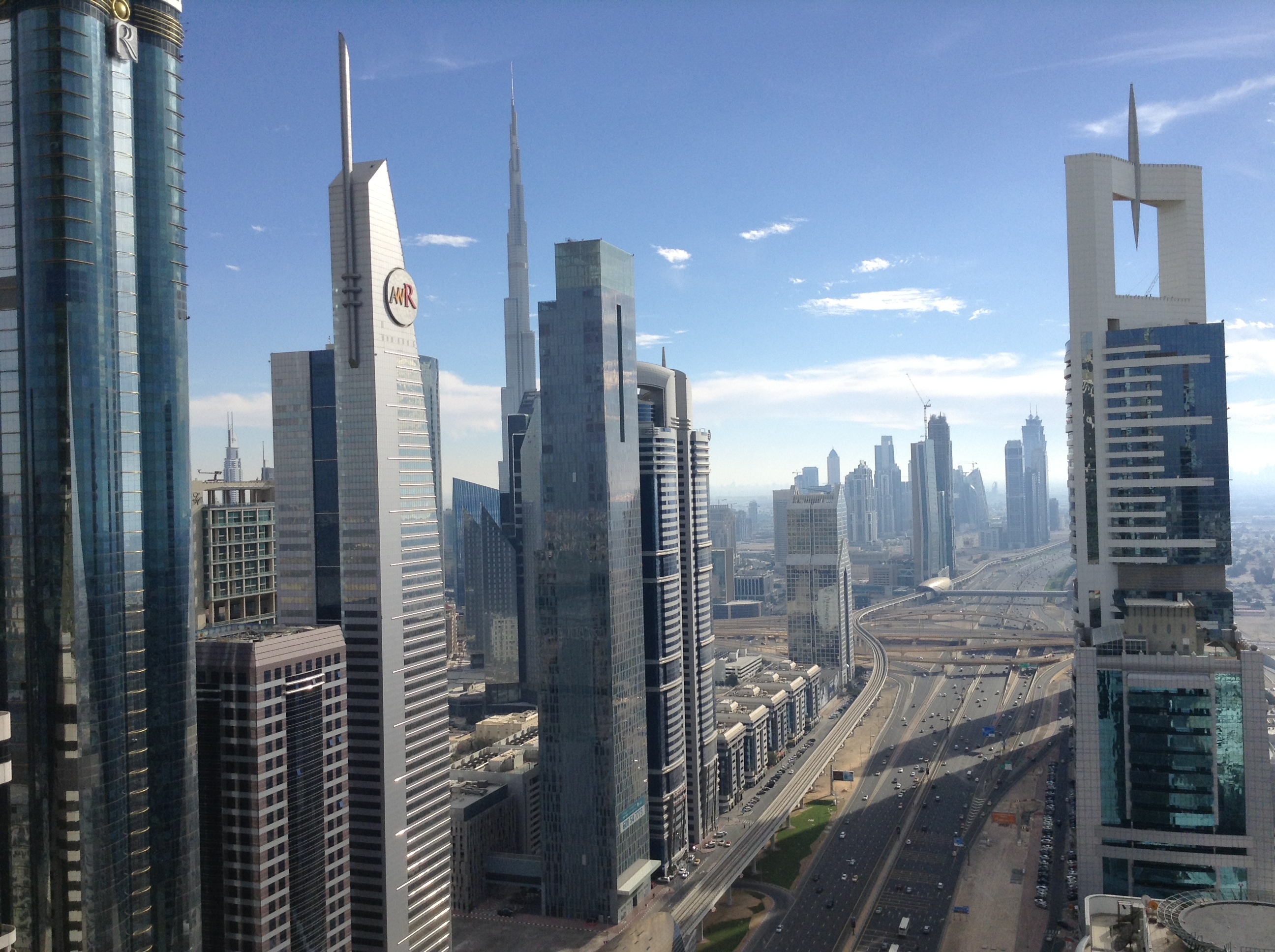
Dubai International Financial Center

The development in the real estate and infrastructure sectors during the recent year has contributed in making the country a global touristic destination. The contribution of tourism in the Emirati GDP increased from 3% in the mid-1990s to more than 16.5% by the end of 2010. This trend is supported by the huge public investments in touristic projects (47 Billion Dollars per annum) carried mainly to expend airports, increase their capacity, set up new airports and ports.

The real estate sector have a positive impact on development, job opportunities, investments and tourism as estate projects were launched to meet the needs of market and the increasing demand for housing and commercial units especially in Dubai and Abu Dhabi.

The UAE has about 37% of the region's petroleum and gas industries, chemical industries, energy and water and garbage projects. The UAE's government have been injecting huge funds in tourism and real estate projects, especially in Abu Dhabi and Dubai. Al Saadiyat Island in Abu Dhabi and Burj Khalifa in Dubai, the tallest tower in the world, world central near "Jebel Ali" are a point in case of the milestones that have given the UAE its high profile of a global tourist destination. According to 2013–2014 Global Competitiveness Report, the UAE ranked fourth worldwide in terms of infrastructure quality.

On 28 November 2020, the Abu Dhabi Media Office announced that the government of United Arab Emirates, ahead of the 49th National Day, granted house loans, land and homes worth $2 billion (7.2 billion dirhams) to their citizens. The package is said to consist of 3,099 plots, 2,000 house loans and 601 homes and exempting some families of the deceased citizens and retirees from the repayment of mortgage. The Director General of the Abu Dhabi Housing Society, Basheer Al Mehairbi said the initiative of providing sustainable housing aimed at ensuring a good standard of living for the citizens of the UAE.

==== Real-estate projects ====
Some of the significant real-estate projects are:

- Burj Khalifa
- Creek Tower
- Mohammed bin Rashid City
- Falcon City of Wonders
- International City
- Dubai Marina
- Jumeirah Beach Residence
- Jumeirah Lakes Towers (JLT)
- Business Bay
- Dubai Hills
- Dubai South
- City Walk
- Al Furjan
- Dubai Sports City
- Dubai Motor City
- Saadiyat Island
- The World, the Palms and the Palm (artificial islands)
- Dubai Miracle Garden, the world's largest natural flower garden.
- Masdar City, a zero carbon, zero waste city.
- Yas Island, in Abu Dhabi, featuring attractions such as Ferrari World,
- Yas Marina

=== Tourism ===
Burj Khalifa, the tallest tower in the world and a major tourist attraction of the United Arab Emirates.

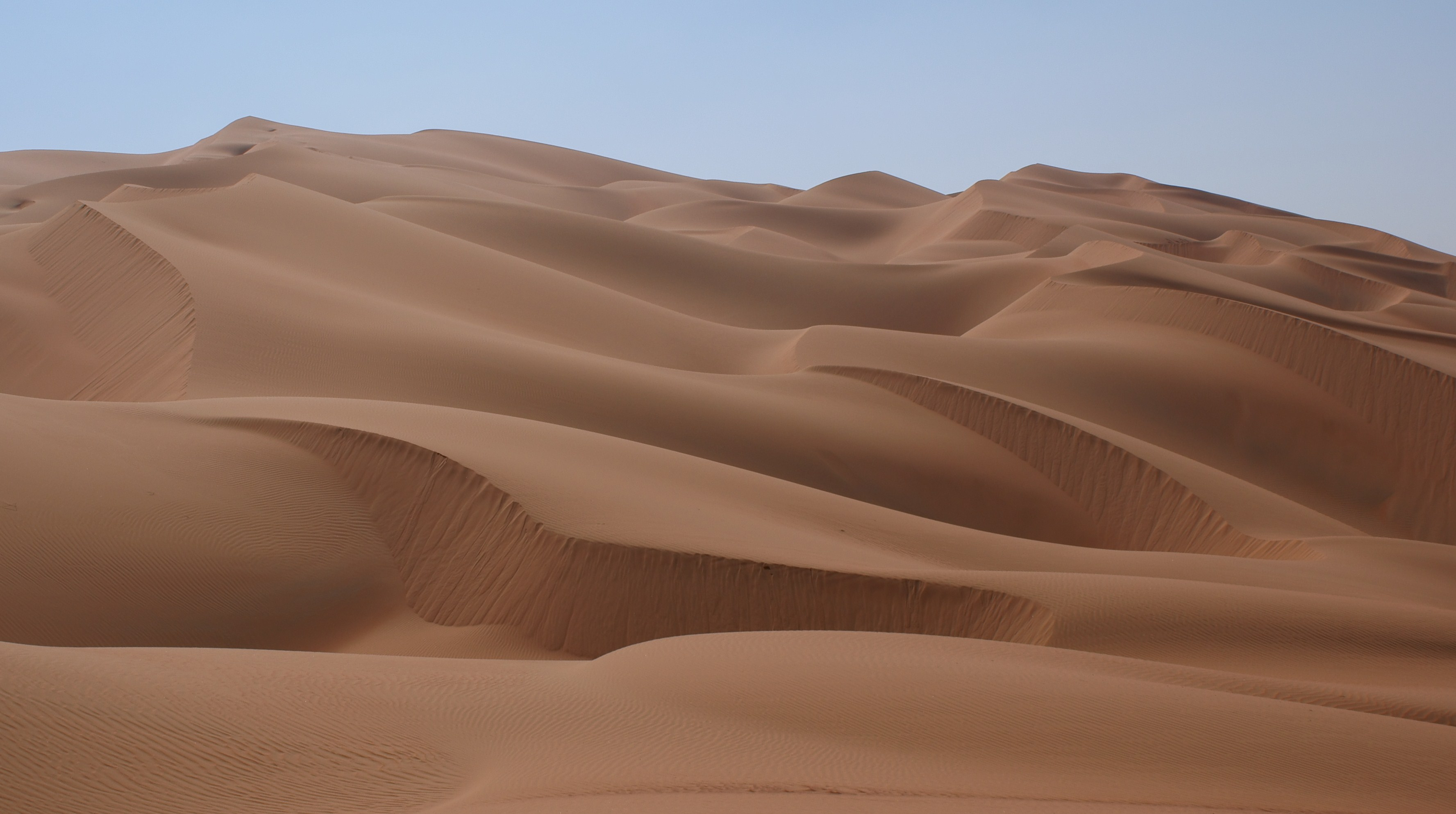
Rub al Khali desert on the outskirts of Liwa Oasis.

Tourism in the United Arab Emirates is an important part of the Emirati economy. In 2023, the tourism sector employed 809,300 people and contributed 220 billion dirham to the national gross domestic product (GDP), accounting for 12% of it. In 2024, the UAE was the 6th destination globally by international tourism receipts according to the World Tourism rankings, and it ranked 18th globally in the Travel and Tourism Development Index.

The country's major tourist attractions include the Burj Khalifa, Dubai Mall, and Palm Jumeirah in Dubai, Sheikh Zayed Grand Mosque and Yas Island in Abu Dhabi, Masfout, and Al Hajar Mountains in Fujairah.

=== Education ===
Provision of education in the United Arab Emirates began shortly after the establishment of the federation with the inception of the first university, the United Arab Emirates University, located in Al Ain, Abu Dhabi. Since then, the country has progressed with efforts to ensure high literacy rates, modern programs and women's share in education. It works on improving its youth's education which is why the agenda 2021 has been set. The UAE currently devotes approximately 16 percent of total federal government spending to education. In 2019, the overall literacy rate was 96%, and in the year 2022, the literacy rate increased to 98.29.

=== Healthcare ===
Life expectancy at birth in the United Arab Emirates

The United Arab Emirates has enacted federal legislation to require universal healthcare. Free healthcare is provided for Emiratis, while health insurance is mandated for citizens of other countries. Employers and sponsors are required to provide health insurance for the expatriate worker or the sponsored person. In the UAE, employers must also provide health insurance for up to one spouse and three dependents, while in Dubai expats are required to provide insurance for their dependents.

Standards of health care are considered to be generally high in the United Arab Emirates, resulting from increased government spending during strong economic years. According to the UAE government, total expenditures on health care from 1996 to 2003 were AED 1,601,384,360.05 (USD$436 million). According to the World Health Organization (WHO), in 2004, total expenditures on health care constituted 2.9 percent of gross domestic product (GDP), and the per capita expenditure for health care was USD$497. Healthcare is free for UAE citizens and there are low-cost options for non-citizens.

The World Bank ranked Dubai and Abu Dhabi as being the second and third, respectively, most popular medical tourism destinations in the region, behind Jordan. In the first half of 2015, Dubai had attracted 260,000 medical tourists, of the total of 630,831 medical tourists who visited 26 hospitals that year, 46% of whom had travelled from outside of the UAE.

=== Transport ===
Transport in the United Arab Emirates refers to the various forms of transport in the United Arab Emirates (UAE) by road, rail, air, and water.

=== Telecommunications ===
Emblem of the United Arab Emirates

Telecommunications and Digital Government Regulatory Authority, United Arab Emirates

Telecommunications in the United Arab Emirates (UAE) is under the control and supervision of the Telecommunications and Digital Government Regulatory Authority which was established under UAE Federal Law by Decree No. 3 of 2003. From 1976 to 2006 the Emirates Telecommunications Corporation (Etisalat) was the sole telephone and telecommunications provider for the UAE. And while there were exceptions for free zones and modern housing developments, for the majority of the UAE, Etisalat held a monopoly on business and personal telecommunications services. In February 2006, this monopoly became a duopoly when a new telephone company and Internet service provider (ISP), du, was established to offer mobile services across the UAE and Internet and TV services to some free zone areas. However, due to geographical distribution of service areas, the companies do not compete for customers and thus effectively operate as monopolies. Earlier du provided triple play services to free zone areas under the name Emirates Integrated Telecommunications Company (EITC), which is still its legal name.

== Foreign trade ==
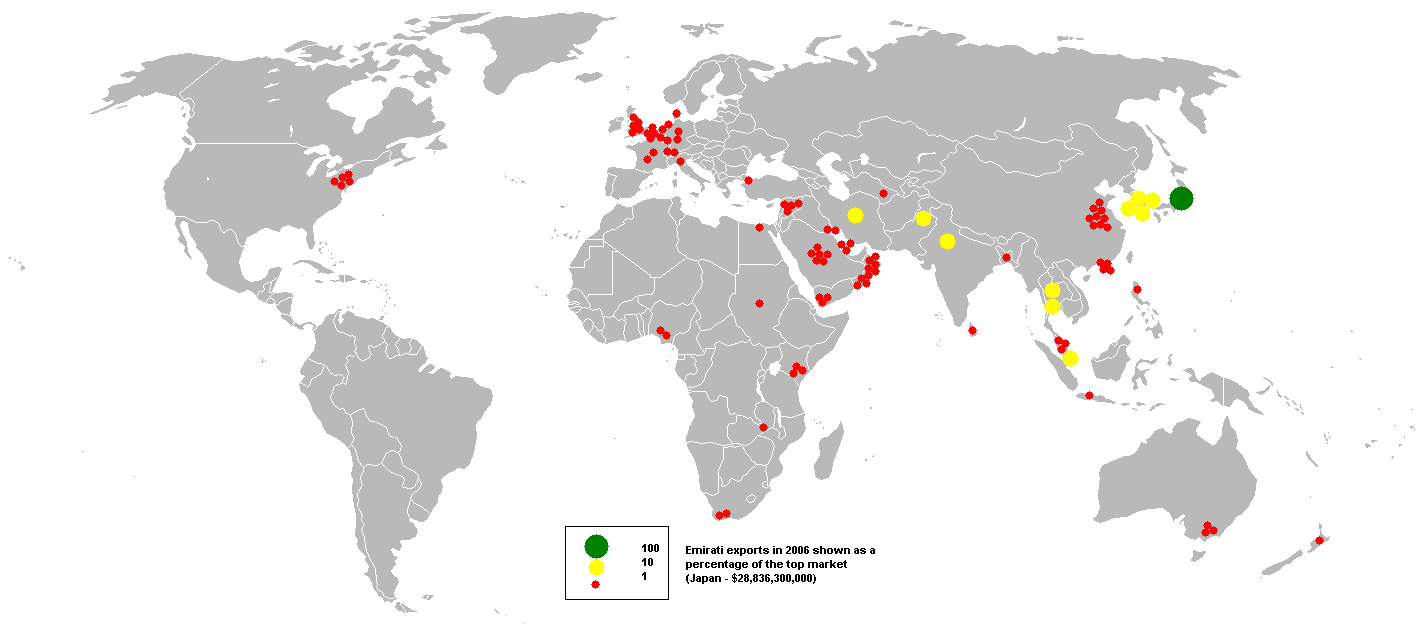
Emirati exports in 2006

Exports of the United Arab Emirates by product category (2019) Chemical products Transportation Machines Mineral products Plastics and rubbers Metals Foodstuffs Precious metals Textiles Instruments Animal products Vegetable products Paper goods Footwear and headwear Miscellaneous Stone and glass Wood products Animal and vegetable bi-products Animal hides Arts and antiques Weapons

With imports totaling $273.5 billion in 2012, UAE passed Saudi Arabia as the largest consumer market in the region. Exports totaled $314 billion, making UAE the second largest exporter in the region.

UAE and India are each other's main trading partners, with the latter having many of its citizens working and living in the former. The trade totals over $75 billion (AED275.25 billion).

In 2021, the main export partners of the UAE were India (14.2%), Japan (8.3%), China (mainland) (7.7%), Saudi Arabia (7.5%), Iraq (4.8%), Singapore (4.0%), the European Union (4.0%), Oman (3.8%), Hong Kong (3.4%), and Thailand (3.0%).

The main import partners in 2012 were China (17.3%), the European Union (12.1%), India (9.4%), the United States (5.5%), Saudi Arabia (5.2%), the United Kingdom (2.8%), Mali (2.7%), Japan (2.6%), Turkey (2.1%), and Vietnam (2.0%).

Concerning foreign trade, the UAE's market is one of the world's most dynamic markets, placed among the 16 largest exporters and 20 largest importers of commodities. The top five Main Partner Countries of the UAE in 2014 were Iran (3.0%), India (2.9%), Saudi Arabia (1.5%), Oman (1.4%) and Switzerland (1.2%). The top five UAE suppliers are China (7.4%), United States (6.4%), India (5.8%), Germany (3.9%) and Japan (3.5%).

UAE's Foreign Trade Indicators
Indicator	2010	2011	2012	2013	2014
Imports of Goods (million USD)	165,000	203,000	226,000	251,000	262,000
Exports of Goods (million USD)	214,000	302,000	349,000	379,000	360,000
Imports of Services (million USD)	41,337	55,702	62,301	66,413	70,279
Exports of Services (million USD)	11,028	12,063	15,276	17,345	19,769
Imports of Goods and Services (Annual % Change)	2.1	18.8	5.2	6.5	6.1
Exports of Goods and Services (Annual % Change)	2.5	20.7	17.0	4.5	8.2
Imports of Goods and Services (in % of GDP)	72.2	72.3	75.3	76.8	77.9
Exports of Goods and Services (in % of GDP)	78.8	90.3	100.6	101.3	98.0

In 2014, the United Arab Emirates managed to export 380.4bn dominated by four products which are UAE all info - (19.8%) Diamonds, whether or not worked, but not mounted... (3.4%) Gold in UAE(3.2%) incl. gold plated with platinum, unwrought...Articles of jewellery and parts thereof, of...(2.8%). In the same year, the United Arab Emirates imported 298.6 bn dominated by five countries which are China (7.4%), United States (6.4%), India (5.8%), Germany (3.9%), Japan (3.5%).

On one hand, the United Arab Emirates managed in 2013 to export 17 bn USD services exported in 2013 dominated by travel (67.13%), transportation (28.13%), Government services (4.74%). On the other hand, it imported 63.9 bn USD of services imported services dominated by transportation (70.68%), travel (27.70%) and government services (1.62%).

In September 2021, the UAE announced plans to increase trade ties with other economies, particularly in Asia and Africa. The country indicated that it was seeking inward foreign investments of around $150 billion in the next nine years, that is, by 2030. The UAE aimed to be one of the world's ten largest investment destinations. However, it faced strong competition from its neighbor, Saudi Arabia, creating a broader gap in the once-assumed alliance between the two countries. The Emirati minister of state for foreign trade said, "Let the Saudis increase the competition. It means the pie is going to be bigger and having a bigger pie means that the UAE share out of this pie is going to be bigger."

The European Union identified that Emirati firms were involved in the direct trade of weapon components to Russia. EU sanctions targeted two UAE-based companies, I Jet Global and Success Aviation Services, which were exporting dual-use goods. The EU warned that countries that will be used for Russia's benefit could face a total ban on imports from the EU military and high tech kit. Furthermore, a trade war with the UAE was expected, if it continued trade with Russia.

The United Arab Emirates has introduced significant changes to its regulations concerning the promotion and distribution of foreign investment funds within the country. As part of these changes, encapsulated in several decisions by the Securities and Commodities Authority, foreign-owned funds can no longer directly advertise or distribute units publicly in the UAE. Instead, these activities are confined to private distribution aimed at Professional Investors and/or Market Counterparties. This shift signifies a strategic move to tighten the circumstances under which foreign funds can interact with UAE-based investors, particularly Retail Customers and Professional Investors, underscoring a push towards a more regulated investment environment.

These regulatory updates have also led to changes in the distribution to Professional Investors, as they are now no longer exempt under the Securities and Commodities Authority Rulebook. Only firms licensed by the SCA to conduct the regulated activity of "Promotion" are now permitted to promote such funds, and only on a private placement basis. Furthermore, the promotion or distribution of foreign funds to retail investors is outright prohibited, although reverse solicitation from retail investors is not prohibited in itself. All foreign funds to be distributed in the UAE must be registered with the SCA, barring those that can prove documented reverse solicitation.

Three Emirati companies were found involved in trade of Iranian petroleum or petrochemical products, and were sanctioned by the US State Department in June 2024. One of the companies was Sea Route Ship Management FZE, which engaged in transport of Iranian petrochemical products as the commercial manager of the vessel ASTRA. The other two firms, Almanac Ship Management LLC and Al Anchor Ship Management FZE were involved in transport of Iranian petroleum products as the commercial manager of the vessels BERENICE PRIDE and PARINE respectively.

In July 2024, Samco Petroleum Energy FZE, located in Hamriyah Free Zone, was put up for sale for $17.7 million, with a promise to provide a turnkey oil trading operation. The sale emerged amidst the US sanctions imposed on several oil traders in the UAE's free trade zones, particularly Hamriyah, for continuing business with Iran and Russia. In November 2023, OFAC sanctioned a dozen companies in various UAE's free zones for facilitating the sale of Iranian products in third countries through Sepehr Energy, which is affiliated with Iran's Armed Forces General Staff. In March 2023, more companies operating in the UAE were sanctioned for exporting petrochemical products from Iran's Persian Gulf Petrochemical Industries to India and Southeast Asia. The Emirati authorities were also pushed to halt Russian imports and exports via Dubai.

In September 2024, the UAE and Australia agreed on a free trade deal, which was expected to increase investment in Australia's significant mineral and clean energy sectors. The deal was to eliminate tariffs on imports of over 99% of Australian goods. However, Australian unions criticized the deal, highlighting the UAE's poor human rights and labor record, including modern slavery under the kafala system. Michele O'Neil also expressed concerns regarding the exploitation of migrant workers in the UAE, calling it one of the most repressive regimes with which Australia has entered into a bilateral trade deal.

== Human Resources and Labor Employment ==
Many buildings were built primarily by workers from South Asia and East Asia. This is generally because the current generation of UAE locals prefer governmental jobs and not private sector employment. On 17 June 2008, there were about 7,500 skilled workers employed at the Burj Khalifa construction site. Press reports indicated in 2006 that skilled carpenters at the site earned £4.34 a day, and labourers earned £2.84. According to a BBC investigation and a Human Rights Watch report, the workers were housed in abysmal conditions, and worked long hours for low pay. During construction, only one construction-related death was reported. However, workplace injuries and fatalities in the UAE are "poorly documented", according to Human Rights Watch.

In March 2006 about 2,500 workers, upset over buses that were delayed for the end of their shifts, protested and triggered a riot, damaging cars, offices, computers and construction equipment. A Dubai Interior Ministry official said the rioters caused almost £500,000 in damage. Most of the workers involved in the riot returned the following day but refused to work. Workers at Dubai airport also protested.

=== Emiratisation ===
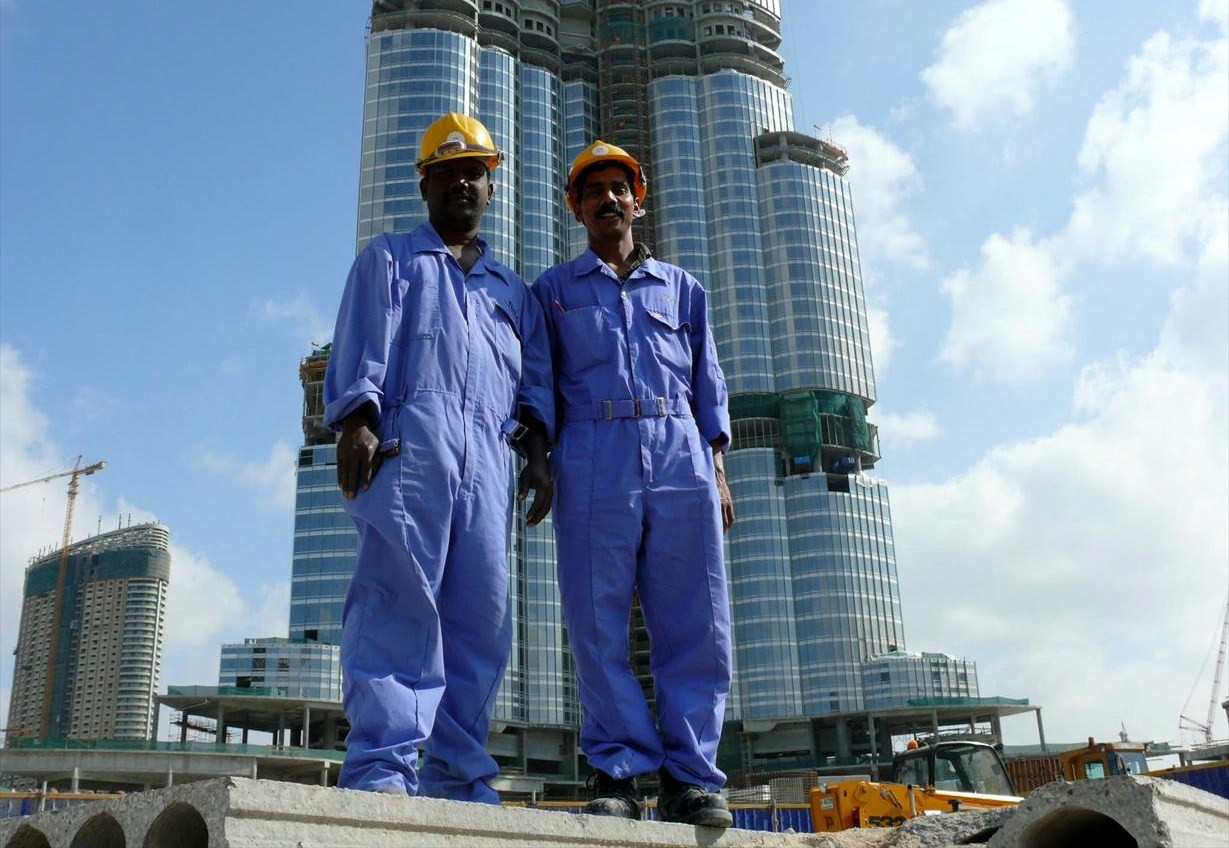
Two blue-collar workers posing for a picture with Burj Khalifa on the background

Emiratisation is an initiative by the government of the UAE to employ more UAE Nationals in a meaningful and efficient manner in the public and private sectors. While the program has been in place for more than a decade and results can be seen in the public sector, the private sector is still lagging behind with citizens only representing 0.34% of the private sector workforce.

While there is general agreement over the importance of Emiratisation for social, economic and political reasons, there is also some contention as to the impact of localization on organizational efficiency. It is yet unknown whether, and the extent to which, employment of nationals generates returns for MNEs operating in the Middle East. Recent research cautions that localization is not always advantageous for firms operating in the region, and its effectiveness depends on a number of contingent factors.

In December 2009 however, a positive impact of UAE citizens in the workplace was identified in a newspaper article citing a yet unpublished study, this advantage being the use of networks within the evolving power structures.

Overall, however, uptake in the private sector remains low regardless of significant investments in education, which have reached record levels with education now accounting for 22.5% – or $2.6 billion – of the overall budget planned for 2010. Multiple governmental initiatives are actively promoting Emiratisation by training anyone from high school dropouts to graduates in a multitude of skills needed for the – essentially Western – work environment of the UAE, these initiatives include Tawteen UAE, ENDP or the Abu Dhabi Tawteen Council.

There are very few anti-discrimination laws in relation to labour issues, with Emiratis – and other GCC nationals – being given preference when it comes to employment. Unions are generally banned and workers with any labour issues are advised to be in touch with the Ministry of Labour, instead of protesting or refusing to work. Migrant employees often complain of poor workplace safety and wages based on nationality, although this is being slowly addressed.

Beyond directly sponsoring educational initiatives, the Emirates Foundation for Philanthropy is funding major research initiatives into Emiratisation through competitive research grants, allowing universities such as United Arab Emirates University or Dubai School of Government to build and disseminate expertise on the topic.

Academics working on various aspects of Emiratisation include Paul Dyer[12] and Natasha Ridge from Dubai School of Government, Ingo Forstenlechner[13] from United Arab Emirates University, Kasim Randaree from the British University of Dubai and Paul Knoglinger from the FHWien.

In 2020, economy of the United Arab Emirates became vulnerable to the COVID-19 pandemic, witnessing an economic shutdown. Among the Emirates, Dubai was facing extreme situation, where the expat workers were left jobless. Thousands of the Britons working in the city started selling off their possessions to collect money, as the strict visa regulations forced them to return to the UK.

According to an April 2021 report published by the Democracy Centre for Transparency on the Discrimination against foreigners and expatriates living in the UAE versus Emirati citizens, despite labor reforms in the UAE, foreigners and skilled or unskilled migrant workers face discrimination and racialization from the citizens of the country. Foreigners and expatriates are often subjected to discrimination at work concerning promotions and wages, or gender inequality. The findings of the DCT concern the organization as the UAE's economy largely relies on foreign workers and thus fulfills a crucial international role. The organization demands that the UAE abide by universal human rights principles.

The 31st edition of World Report 2021 released by Human Rights Watch reiterates that labour abuses driven by an exploitative kafala system are persistent in the UAE. During the COVID-19 pandemic, migrant workers faced massive unemployment issues and were also left stranded in dire conditions without legal residencies. Also, many migrants suffered wage theft and were unable to pay rent or buy food.

== Investment ==
The stock market capitalization of listed companies in the UAE was valued at $109.9 billion in October 2012 by Bloomberg.

=== Outward investment ===
A investment institutions were created by the government to promote manage investments made by the UAE abroad:

- Abu Dhabi Investment Authority (ADIA)
- Abu Dhabi Investment Council (ADIC)
- Mubadala Development Company (MDC)
- International Petroleum Investment Company (IPIC)
- Dubai World
- Dubai International Capital (DIC)

== Corporate Governance Code ==
The Capital Market Authority (CMA) introduced a new corporate governance regulation (the Corporate Governance Code), which applies to all joint stock companies and institutions whose securities are listed on Dubai Financial Market (DFM) and Abu Dhabi Securities Exchange (ADX) in 2009.

== Regional GDP ==
Data shown are for the year 2023 in nominal numbers.

Emirate	GDP (billion US$)	GDP per capita (US$)
Abu Dhabi	219.1	65,700
Ajman	10.9	22,600
Dubai	138.1	44,600
Fujairah	6.8	23,500
Ras Al Khaimah	14.3	30,700
Sharjah	56.1	32,100
Umm Al Quwain	0.7	7,700
United Arab Emirates	446.0	48,000

== Data ==
The following table shows the main economic indicators in 1980–2031 (with IMF estimates between 2026 and 2031). Inflation below 5% is in green.

Year	GDP (in Int'l$ PPP, ICP benchmarks 2017–2021)	GDP per capita (in Int'l$ PPP, ICP benchmarks 2017–2021)	GDP (current prices, in bn. US$ nominal)	GDP per capita (current prices, in US$ nominal)	GDP growth (constant prices, % change)	Inflation rate (year average, % change)	Government debt (gross, in % of GDP)
1980	64.1	63,504	41.7	41,312	▼−1.8%	▲10.1%	n/a
1985	▲80.1	▼58,032	▼38.5	▼27,913	▼−2.5%	▲3.5%	n/a
1990	▲110.6	▲59,989	▲50.7	▼27,485	▲23.6%	▲0.6%	n/a
1995	▲151.2	▲62,695	▲63.4	▼26,309	▲6.6%	▲4.3%	n/a
2000	▲221.1	▲69,756	▲103.0	▲32,496	▲12.3%	▲1.3%	3.1%
2005	▲321.9	▲70,197	▲180.6	▲39,389	▲4.9%	▲6.2%	▲4.5%
2006	▲364.5	▲74,230	▲222.1	▲45,240	▲9.8%	▲9.3%	▲5.1%
2007	▲386.2	▼69,033	▲257.9	▲46,090	▲3.2%	▲11.1%	▲8.9%
2008	▲406.3	▼62,521	▲315.5	▲48,549	▲3.2%	▲12.3%	8.9%
2009	▼387.3	▼57,177	▼253.5	▼37,428	▼−5.2%	▼−4.7%	▲21.1%
2010	▲423.1	▲60,746	▲307.7	▲44,180	▲7.9%	▲0.9%	▼18.3%
2011	▲460.9	▲63,635	▲368.9	▲50,925	▲6.7%	▲0.9%	▲20.4%
2012	▲491.5	▲65,194	▲392.8	▲52,099	▲4.7%	▲0.7%	▼20.2%
2013	▲524.5	▲66,840	▲409.6	▲52,204	▲4.9%	▲1.1%	▼15.3%
2014	▲558.3	▲67,495	▲424.9	▼51,370	▲4.6%	▲2.3%	▼13.5%
2015	▲603.5	▲69,058	▼382.0	▼43,712	▲7.1%	▲4.1%	▲15.6%
2016	▲643.7	▲70,484	▼381.7	▼41,801	▲5.7%	▲1.6%	▲18.6%
2017	▲648.2	▼69,592	▲403.4	▲43,305	▼−1.1%	▲2.0%	▲21.2%
2018	▲723.9	▲77,181	▲440.6	▲46,974	▲1.5%	▲3.1%	▼20.7%
2019	▲753.9	▲79,254	▼433.9	▼45,615	▲1.3%	▼−1.9%	▲25.8%
2020	▼627.9	▼67,594	▼357.2	▼38,449	▼−8.7%	▼−2.1%	▲30.1%
2021	▲656.7	▼66,592	▲422.4	▲42,840	▲4.6%	▼−0.1%	▲35.7%
2022	▲756.4	▲73,519	▲511.4	▲49,704	▲7.5%	▲4.8%	▼31.5%
2023	▲818.5	▲76,653	▲522.6	▼48,941	▲4.3%	▲1.6%	▲31.9%
2024	▲894.6	▲79,208	▲581.0	▲51,439	▲6.6%	▲1.7%	▲33.2%
2025	▲975.4	▲85,967	▲614.4	▲54,151	▲6.2%	▲1.3%	▲33.9%
2026f	▼968.8	▼83,704	▲661.0	▲57,109	▼−3.9%	▲4.5%	▼32.8%
2027f	▲1,075.8	▲91,517	▲699.4	▲59,499	▲7.7%	▲2.5%	▼30.8%
2028f	▲1,174.8	▲98,618	▲737.7	▲61,924	▲7.0%	▲2.0%	▼29.0%
2029f	▲1,268.1	▲105,199	▲784.3	▲65,063	▲5.9%	▲2.0%	▼27.4%
2030f	▲1,339.3	▲109,861	▲823.7	▲67,570	▲3.7%	▲2.0%	▼27.0%
2031f	▲1,410.5	▲114,421	▲865.6	▲70,216	▲3.5%	▲2.0%	▼26.1%

== See also ==
- Economy of Dubai
- List of companies of the United Arab Emirates
- List of government-owned companies of the United Arab Emirates
- List of largest companies of the United Arab Emirates
- List of Emiratis by net worth
- Central Bank of the United Arab Emirates
- Corruption in the United Arab Emirates
- Money Laundering in the United Arab Emirates
- Department of Economic Development (Dubai)
- Dubai Economic Council
- E-Government in the United Arab Emirates
- Emirates business model
- Ministry of Economy & Tourism
- Ministry of Finance (United Arab Emirates)
- National Bonds Corporation PJSC
- Taxation in the United Arab Emirates
- Human rights in the United Arab Emirates
- Israel–United Arab Emirates peace agreement
- Targeted Economic Support Scheme
- Economy of the Middle East
