= Money laundering in the United Arab Emirates =

Money laundering in the United Arab Emirates refers to the use of the UAE's banking system, real estate market, gold and precious-metals trade, free trade zones, and informal remittance ("hawala") networks to disguise the origins of illicitly obtained funds. Since the mid-twentieth century, the emirate of Dubai in particular has developed as a regional trading and financial hub whose lack of regulatory oversight, low taxation, banking secrecy, and historical role as a 're-export' centre (ie. smuggling hub) have repeatedly attracted the attention of international regulators, journalists, and law-enforcement agencies investigating money laundering, sanctions evasion, and terrorist financing.

The UAE was placed on the Financial Action Task Force (FATF)'s list of "Jurisdictions under Increased Monitoring" (the so-called grey list) in March 2022 following a 2020 mutual evaluation that identified deficiencies across the banking sector, the Dubai property market, the precious-metals trade, and money-service businesses. The UAE was removed from the list in February 2024 after implementing a series of legislative and institutional reforms, a decision that was itself contested by some European Parliament members, transparency advocates, and journalists following the 2024 "Dubai Unlocked" leak of property records. Further bringing the appropriatess of removing Dubai from the list is the recent "Global Web of Corruption" report (2025) showing that 262 individuals funneled $31 billion into the UAE real estate market including insiders from Syria's regime, Algerian elites and Russian oligarchs.

This article discusses the historical development of the UAE, (primarily Dubai) as a hub for laundering and sheltering dirty money, the country's anti-money-laundering (AML) legal and regulatory framework; sectors and mechanisms that international bodies and investigative journalists have repeatedly identified as vulnerable to abuse; and some documented cases in which these mechanisms are reported to have been abused. Consistent with the findings of intergovernmental bodies such as FATF, this article distinguishes between conduct that has been formally sanctioned, prosecuted, or admitted, and allegations that remain contested or unproven, which are attributed to their source.

== History ==
=== Pearling, gold, and the pre-oil economy ===
Dubai's role as a regional trading hub, and later as a sanctuary for smugglers, predates the discovery of oil. The town was declared a free port in 1901, prompting an influx of Persian and Arab merchants from the port of Lingah who brought trading networks extending to India and East Africa. Successive rulers of the Al Maktoum dynasty pursued policies of low tariffs and open trade throughout the twentieth century. Beginning in the 1950's investments in infrastructure, most notably the dredging of Dubai Creek and the construction of Port Rashid (and later in the 20th Century) Jebel Ali Port, cemented Dubai's position as the Gulf's principal transshipment hub.

Since the 1940s Dubai has been a significant node in gold smuggling to the Indian subcontinent, where colonial-era and post-independence Indian gold-import restrictions created a large price differential between London bullion markets and Bombay. Merchant families in Dubai, operating legally under Trucial States arrangements, imported gold from London and Zurich and 're-exported' it, with buyers arranging clandestine delivery to Indian ports and coastal waters; the trade was classed as smuggling from the Indian perspective but was not illegal in Dubai itself. By 1968, Dubai's gold imports reached roughly £56 million, and the trade earned Dubai the nickname "the City of Gold." According to the Carnegie Endowment for International Peace, Dubai's earliest documented links to illicit finance were tied precisely to this gold and, separately, slave-trade smuggling, with prominent merchant families later acknowledging their historical role; the Carnegie report cites an account by Saif al-Ghurair, a member of a leading Dubai merchant family, describing his own smuggling of stolen ammunition and gold in the 1940s and 1950s. The same report states that in 1958 the ruling sheikh, in discussions with the British Foreign Office, acknowledged the importance of smuggling to the city's economy, and that Dubai also permitted hashish and opium smuggling routes from Iran and later Afghanistan during this period.

Additionally Dubai allowed / facilitated the smuggling of hashish and opium from Iran and later Afghanistan to Europe and Africa.

=== BCCI and the 1970s–1990s ===
The Bank of Credit and Commerce International (BCCI), founded in 1972 by Pakistani banker Agha Hasan Abedi with financing from Bank of America and the ruling family of Abu Dhabi, who became the bank's principal shareholder, grew into a multinational institution with more than 400 offices in over 70 countries by 1991. A 1992 U.S. Senate Foreign Relations Subcommittee investigation (the "BCCI Affair" report) documented that the bank's criminality included fraud, money laundering across Europe, Africa, Asia, and the Americas, bribery of officials, and support for terrorism and arms trafficking, and found that trade-based laundering—particularly over- and under-invoicing of gold and luxury-goods trades—was routed through BCCI branches in the UAE and Pakistan. BCCI was shut down by regulators in July 1991 owing an estimated $10–20 billion; Abu Dhabi, as principal shareholder, is estimated to have lost around $2 billion in the collapse. BCCI is widely cited by anti-money-laundering historians as a landmark case that exposed how a bank headquartered in a jurisdiction with limited independent regulatory capacity could exploit gaps across multiple countries' banking oversight.

=== Post-independence growth and ties to Iran, Afghanistan, and post-Soviet states ===
Following the UAE's founding in 1971 and the construction of the Jebel Ali Free Zone in 1985, Dubai developed extensive trade and financial links with Iran, Afghanistan, South Asia, and, after 1991, the post-Soviet states. According to the Carnegie Endowment, Dubai's ties to Iran deepened after the Iranian Revolution of 1979, with waves of Iranian migration bringing an estimated 10,000 Iranian-owned businesses to the UAE by 2010. It was estimated that roughly $15 billion were transferred from Iran to Dubai in 2007 alone. The same report and other historical accounts describe Dubai as having served as a transit route for war materiel to Iran during the Iran–Iraq War, and later as a key location through which Pakistani nuclear scientist Abdul Qadeer Khan's proliferation network moved nuclear-related equipment and finance toward Iran and Libya until roughly 2004.

Following the fall of the Taliban government in 2001 and the influx of international reconstruction funds into Afghanistan, Dubai became a significant destination for illegal capital flight from Kabul. A U.S. diplomatic cable released by WikiLeaks reported that Afghanistan's then vice president arrived in Dubai in 2010 carrying $52 million in cash. Afghan power broker Sherkhan Farnood, a co-founder of Kabul Bank, was convicted of fraud in 2013 after laundering hundreds of millions of dollars for Taliban-linked figures including warlords, terrorists and narcotics traffickers - largely through a Dubai based trading company and the hawala channels that exist between Afghanistan and Dubai in; much of the laundered money was invested in Palm Jumeirah real estate.

=== Nuclear proliferation and terror finance ===
Until 2004, Dubai's banking and trade infrastructure was also key to helping smuggle nuclear parts to Iran and Libya as part of A.Q. Khan's illegal distribution of nuclear weapons technology. At the same time Taliban and al-Qaeda reportedly moved gold out of Afghanistan through Dubai, sometimes on Viktor Bout's aircraft. Even before 9/11, the US was already concerned about money laundering and illicit financial flows through Dubai's banks.

=== The 2012 Gas-for-Gold Scheme and Circumventing Sanctions on Iran ===
According to an account published by Stanford University Press, Turkey's gold exports to Iran had already swelled to $1.8 billion by July 2012 as part of an arrangement in which Iran accepted gold in place of hard currency for natural gas, a workaround for Iran's exclusion from the international banking system under sanctions. Once this overt gold-for-gas trade drew unwanted attention, the parties turned to the United Arab Emirates to obscure the transactions, with the source describing Dubai as an ideal intermediary given its roughly three-decade history of facilitating sanctions evasion on Iran's behalf.

Turkish gold exports to the UAE consequently jumped from about $7 million in June 2012 to roughly $1.9 billion in August, a month in which the 36 tons of gold Turkey shipped to the UAE made up over four-fifths of Turkey's total gold exports. The gold moved in a way designed to stay within UAE customs rules allowing individuals to bring in up to 50 kilograms of gold per visit: couriers acting for Turkish firms made hundreds of separate trips to Dubai, typically carrying the metal in their carry-on luggage, with much of that August volume reportedly passing through the passenger terminal at Istanbul's Atatürk Airport. Once the gold reached the UAE, the source notes, its subsequent path became untraceable.

== Legal and regulatory framework ==
The UAE first criminalized the possession or concealment of criminal proceeds in 1987 and enacted its first dedicated anti-money-laundering statute, Federal Law No. 4 of 2002, ahead of the second round of Middle East and North Africa Financial Action Task Force (MENAFATF) mutual evaluations. In 1998 the Central Bank of the UAE established a specialised unit to investigate suspicious transactions, which was renamed the Anti-Money Laundering and Suspicious Cases Unit in 2002. It later became theFinancial Intelligence Unit (FIU) under Federal Decree-Law No. 20 of 2018 on Anti-Money Laundering and Combating the Financing of Terrorism.

Following its 2020 mutual evaluation and 2022 grey-listing, the UAE adopted further reforms. These include Federal Decree-Law No. 26 of 2021 (which amended the 2018 law); a 2022 law regulating virtual assets; the establishment in December 2020 of the Executive Office to Combat Money Laundering and Terrorist Financing; the creation of specialised money-laundering courts in several emirates; and the National Committee for Combating Money Laundering and the Financing of Terrorism and Illegal Organisations, which oversees national risk assessments. Federal Decree-Law No. 10 of 2025 and related amendments continued to update the legal framework.

=== FATF mutual evaluations ===
FATF and MENAFATF jointly assessed the UAE's AML/CFT system in a Mutual Evaluation Report adopted in February 2020 and published in April 2020. The report found that while the UAE had recently strengthened its legal framework, "as a major global financial centre and trading hub, it must take urgent action to effectively stop the criminal financial flows that it attracts." The report specifically flagged supervisory weaknesses in banks, the Dubai property market, dealers in gold and other precious metals and stones, and hawaladars (informal money-transfer operators), and noted that the UAE's "limited number of money laundering prosecutions and convictions, particularly in Dubai, are a concern given the country's risk profile." It also noted that the UAE's 39 separate company registries across its free zones created a "real risk" of misuse of legal entities.

As a consequence of this evaluation, FATF placed the UAE under enhanced follow-up and, at its March 2022 plenary, added the country to its list of Jurisdictions under Increased Monitoring (the grey list). Following a series of reported reforms including increased money-laundering investigations and prosecutions; outreach to designated non-financial businesses and professions; and greater use of financial intelligence; the UAE was removed from the grey list on 23 February 2024. The public statement said that the country had made "significant progress" and had addressed the shortcomings identified in its action plan. The European Union subsequently removed the UAE from its own list of high-risk third countries for money laundering.

== Documented mechanisms and vulnerable sectors ==
=== Real estate ===
International bodies and investigative journalists have repeatedly identified Dubai's luxury real estate market as a channel for the laundering of illicit proceeds. In 2018, the Center for Advanced Defense Studies, published a report titled in a report titled Sandcastles: Tracing Sanctions Evasion Through Dubai's Luxury Real Estate Market in which they identified 44 Dubai-based luxury properties directly associated with 7 indiciduals under sanctions for offences including conflict financing, drug trafficking, weapon smuggling, terrorism financincg and grand corruption.

In May 2024, the Organized Crime and Corruption Reporting Project (OCCRP) and more than 70 media partners published "Dubai Unlocked," based on a leak of Dubai property ownership data. The investigation identified roughly 200 individuals - including alleged criminals, fugitives, politically exposed persons, and individuals under international sanctions who between them owned more than 1,000 properties in Dubai. Transparency International, reviewed a sample of 100 politically exposed persons identified in an earlier 2018 leak of Dubai property records and found that at least 58 of them still owned the Dubai properties despite lacking any official income that could explain such purchases. The conclusion of the report was that there was no evidence that UAE authorities had targeted these assets even after the information became public. Subsequent OCCRP reporting linked additional individuals, including those involved in a major Singapore-based money-laundering ring that Singaporean courts hav found tobe laundering proceeds of illegal gambling and cyberfraud, to purchases of Dubai properties.

In June 2024 FATF said that it would review the Dubai Unlocked findings and take them into account in future assessments of the UAE. The investigation prompted questions from members of the European Parliament, some of whom argued that the findings undermined FATF's earlier decision to remove the UAE from its grey list.

=== Gold and precious metals ===
The UAE, and Dubai specifically, is one of the world's largest gold trading and refining hubs, importing gold with no significant domestic mining industry of its own and re-exporting it globally. FATF's 2020 evaluation and subsequent reporting have identified the precious-metals sector as a persistent high-risk area for money laundering and the mixing of legitimate and illicit gold supply chains.

A prominent documented case involves Kaloti Jewellery Group, one of the largest gold traders and refiners in the Middle East. According to reporting by the International Consortium of Investigative Journalists (ICIJ) based on leaked U.S. Treasury suspicious activity reports (the "FinCEN Files"), a U.S. Drug Enforcement Administration led task force investigated Kaloti between 2010 and 2014 (code-named "Operation Honey Badger") over suspected laundering of drug-trafficking proceeds through gold purchases, and recommended in 2014 that the U.S. Treasury designate Kaloti a "primary money laundering concern" under the USA PATRIOT Act. It was the first time such a designation had been applied to a precious-metals company. According to ICIJ, the U.S. Treasury ultimately declined to act, with former officials citing diplomatic concerns about angering the UAE, a key U.S. ally. Separately, a 2014 internal audit by the accounting firm Ernst & Young (as reported by The Guardian and Global Witness) found that Kaloti had in 2012 failed to report suspicious cash transactions worth over $5.2 billion, had knowingly accepted gold bars imported from Morocco disguised as silver with falsified paperwork and purchased gold from the Sudan without adequately vetting the suppliers. Kaloti has consistently and vehemently denied any wrongdoing, stating that it conducts robust anti-money-laundering due diligence, that its checks have never identified criminality among its clients, and that it has never been formally found by any regulator to have handled conflict minerals. Kaloti's Dubai refinery was removed from the Dubai Multi Commodities Centre's "Good Delivery" accreditation list in 2015, though the company continued operating and later opened new refineries.

More recently, gold sourced from areas of Sudan controlled by the paramilitary Rapid Support Forces (RSF) during the Sudanese civil war that began in 2023 has been reported by the U.S. Treasury's Office of Foreign Assets Control (OFAC), the Swiss NGO Swissaid, and multiple news outlets to be smuggled into the UAE and refined in Dubai. The revenue from this gold is used used to fund RSF weapons procurement. Swissaid, citing UN Comtrade data, reported that the UAE's declared direct gold imports from Sudan rose from 17 tonnes in 2023 to 29 tonnes in 2024. The UAE government has categorically denied allegations that it arms or funds the RSF, describing such claims as attempts to derail Sudan's peace process.

In 2024, the UAE suspended operations at 32 gold refineries after its Ministry of Economy identified 256 anti-money-laundering violations in field inspections, including failures to screen customers and transactions against terrorism-related watchlists; the Ministry stated its commitment to "developing an integrated legislative and regulatory system to combat money laundering."

=== Trade-based laundering and free trade zones ===
The UAE operates approximately 45 free trade zones, roughly 30 of which are in Dubai. These zones allow 100%foreign ownership, no corporate or customs taxes and streamlined company registration. FATF's 2020 evaluation found that the proliferation of separate company registries across 39 separate zones created opportunities for "regulatory arbitrage" and greatly complicated efforts to establish beneficial ownership of companies operating within them.

The Carnegie Endowment's 2020 report identified trade-based money laundering through over-and under-invoicing, multiple invoicing, and mislabeling of goods moving through Dubai's free zones, often in conjunction with hawala networks, as a persistent vulnerability, citing cases in the UK and EU in which value-added-tax "carousel fraud" and European carbon-credit fraud proceeds were being laundered through Dubai banks and real estate.

=== Hawala and informal remittance ===
FATF's 2020 evaluation identified hawaladars, operators of informal, trust-based remittance networks common across South Asia and the Middle East as a specific area of supervisory weakness in the UAE recommending enhanced monitoring, guidance, and outreach to the sector. Hawala networks linking Dubai to Afghanistan and Pakistan have been cited in connection with the financing of the Taliban and other armed groups, as well as broader capital flight, in reporting by the Carnegie Endowment and other researchers.

=== Sanctions evasion (Iran and Russia) ===
Dubai's 're-export' trade with Iran, dates back to the early twentieth century and has frequently attracted U.S. and international scrutiny as a channel used by Iran to evade international sanctions. The Foundation for Defense of Democracies reported in 2020 that Reuters investigators had found Iran using front companies in Dubai and Turkey to export petrochemical products to third countries. The U.S. Treasury identified the UAE in a 2025 report as "the most commonly occurring jurisdiction" in a dataset of Iran-related suspicious activity reports, including transactions tied to Hong Kong-based shell companies.

Following Russia's 2022 invasion of Ukraine, the U.S. Treasury's Office of Foreign Assets Control designated numerous UAE-based entities for facilitating Russian sanctions evasion.

In May 2023, OFAC designated Dubai-headquartered Huriya Private FZE, describing it as "heavily involved in moving Russian finance into the UAE and money laundering," alleging that the firm helped wealthy Russian nationals move assets into sanctions-resistant structures and procure non-Russian passports under assumed names; OFAC also designated the firm's Irish founder, John Desmond Hanafin.

In November 2023, OFAC designated 130 additional Russia-linked entities and individuals, including several UAE-based trading and financial-engineering firms, stating that the UAE, along with China and Türkiye, continued to serve as a hub for exporting or transshipping dual-use goods to Russia and for routing Russian illicit finance.

By 2025, an analysis of OFAC data found that sanctions on UAE-based entities and individuals had grown to span some 30 different U.S. sanctions programs, with UAE exports to Russia rising from $1.4 billion in 2021 to $4.5 billion in 2023.

The cryptocurrency exchange Garantex, sanctioned by OFAC in 2022 for allegedly laundering funds for ransomware operators and darknet markets, continued operating after sanctions and was linked to individuals residing in the UAE; two of its alleged operators, one a UAE resident, were criminally charged by the U.S. Department of Justice in March 2025 following an international law-enforcement operation that seized the exchange's infrastructure.

== Criticism and government response ==
International and academic assessments frame Dubai's exposure to illicit finance as arising from structural features of its economic model - rapid, trade-driven growth; a proliferation of loosely coordinated free trade zones; historically limited formal banking history; and a governance structure in which the ruling family exercises substantial personal control over regulatory bodies—rather than as a discrete or exceptional policy failure. The Carnegie Endowment's 2020 report concluded that "part of what underpins Dubai's prosperity is a steady stream of illicit proceeds," while also stating explicitly that "the vast majority of financial, business, and real estate transactions in Dubai are not associated with illegal activity."

UAE authorities have consistently rejected the characterization that the country is a haven for illicit money and have pointed to a substantial expansion of enforcement activity. Following the 2024 Dubai Unlocked investigation, UAE officials stated that the country "works closely with international partners to disrupt and deter all forms of illicit finance" and reported that the total value of fines imposed by AML authorities had roughly tripled since 2022. Dubai's Ministry of Interior reported resolving 521 money-laundering cases between 2022 and 2024, resulting in the arrest of 387 internationally wanted individuals and confiscations exceeding 4 billion dirhams. Dubai's Public Prosecution has periodically announced convictions and asset seizures in specific money-laundering and cryptocurrency-laundering cases, framing these as evidence of a functioning enforcement system. In a statement responding to ICIJ's 2020 reporting on the Kaloti investigation, the UAE Embassy in Washington said the country "is continually improving its own security—and those of its allies—by limiting and preventing illegal transshipments and money flows" and had recently updated its anti-money-laundering laws. Regarding allegations of financing the Rapid Support Forces in Sudan, the UAE's foreign ministry has stated that it "categorically rejects" such claims, describing them as attempts "to derail the peace process and evade the moral, legal, and humanitarian obligations" of resolving the conflict.

Some experts and advocacy groups have questioned whether reported reforms have been matched by comparable changes in outcomes. Jodi Vittori, a co-author of the Carnegie Endowment's 2020 report, was quoted in 2020 as saying there was "strong agreement that Dubai seems to lack political will to enforce many of its [financial crime] laws." Journalists and some FATF critics have pointed to the continued prevalence of high-profile Dubai property purchases by sanctioned and criminally implicated individuals as evidence that formal legal reform has not been accompanied by comparable enforcement against powerful economic actors, a criticism UAE officials dispute by pointing to increased prosecutions, fines, and international cooperation.

== See also ==
- Bank of Credit and Commerce International
- Dubai Islamic Bank fraud case
- Economy of the United Arab Emirates
- Economy of Dubai
- Financial Action Task Force
- Hawala
- Kimberley Process Certification Scheme
- Rapid Support Forces
- International sanctions during the Russian invasion of Ukraine
- Sanctions against Iran
