= Khalifa International Award for Date Palm and Agricultural Innovation =

- Awarded for: Promoting innovation and research in date palm cultivation and agricultural science.
- Description: An international award recognizing agricultural innovation and date palm research.
- Sponsored by: Khalifa bin Zayed Al Nahyan
- Country: United Arab Emirates
- First award: 2007
- Website: http://www.kiaai.ae/en

The Khalifa International Award for Date Palm and Agricultural Innovation is an award launched by His Highness Sheikh Khalifa bin Zayed Al Nahyan. Its primary objective is to promote and encourage agricultural innovation, as well as the study, research, and dissemination of date palm cultivation worldwide.

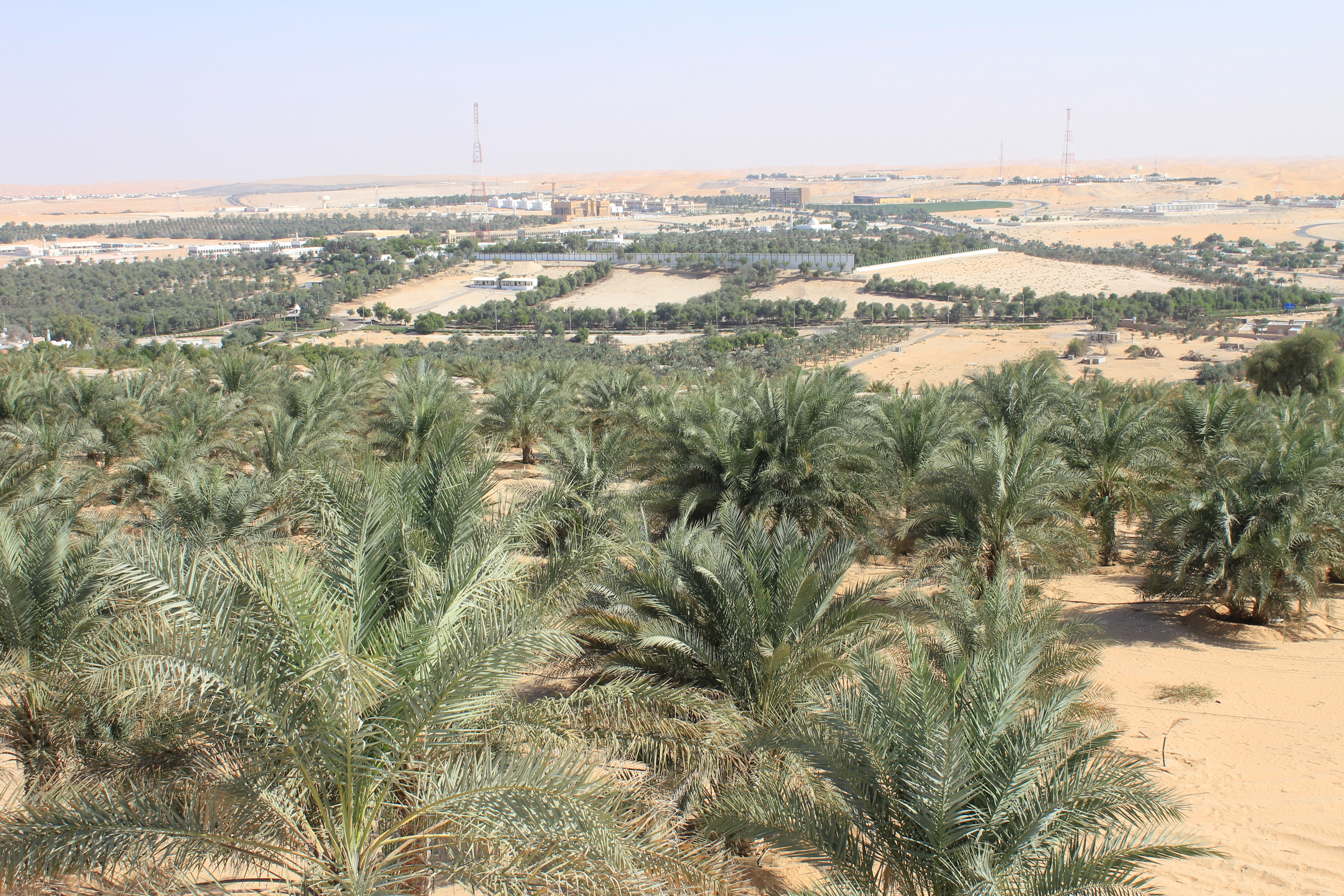
Date Palms in Liwa Oasis, Abu Dhabi

As of 2024, the award has seen 2,012 participants representing 62 countries worldwide. Among these, 161 candidates from the United Arab Emirates participated, accounting for 8% of the international participation, with 30 of them emerging as winners.

In 2023, the Khalifa International Award received the International Design Award in Germany for its international scientific report titled "Khalifa International Award – Bridging Borders." The book won the award in the Best Design category, competing against approximately 3,578 projects.

== Objectives ==
The primary objectives are to:

- Highlight the UAE's leading and responsible role in fostering creativity and innovation within the date palm and agricultural sectors, and its commitment to environmental protection issues.
- Combat poverty and expand green areas to achieve sustainable development.
- Support scientific research and encourage and recognize those working to develop the agricultural and date palm sectors in the UAE and worldwide, leveraging diverse expertise to improve agricultural and date palm realities according to global best practices.

== See also ==
- Agriculture in the United Arab Emirates
- International Center for Agricultural Research in the Dry Areas
