= Minister for Artificial Intelligence (disambiguation) =

The Minister of Artificial Intelligence (created as Minister for Artificial Intelligence) is a British Government cabinet position.

Minister for Artificial Intelligence or Minister of Artificial Intelligence may also refer to:

- Diella (AI system), an Albanian artificial intelligence system formally dubbed Minister of State for Artificial Intelligence
- Minister for Artificial Intelligence and Digital Economy (South Australia), Government of South Australia, Australia
- Minister for Artificial Intelligence and Digital Economy (Victoria), Government of Victoria, Australia
- Minister for Artificial Intelligence, Information Technology and Digital Services, Government of Tamil Nadu, India
- Minister of State for Artificial Intelligence, Digital Economy, and Remote Work Applications, a post within the Ministry of State for Artificial Intelligence, Digital Economy and Remote Work Applications, United Arab Emirates
