= Agriculture in the United Arab Emirates =

Agriculture in the United Arab Emirates, including fishing, was a minor part of the UAE economy in the early 1990s, contributing less than 4 percent of GDP. Since the formation of the UAE, the availability of capital and the demand for fresh produce have encouraged agricultural development. The main farming areas are Digdaga in Ras al-Khaimah. Falaj al Mualla in Umm al Qawain, Wadi adh Dhayd in Sharjah, Al Awir in Dubai and the coastal area of Al Fujairah. Total cultivable land was around 70,000 hectares as of the early 1990s.

In the early 1990s, these sectors contributed less than 2% to the nation's Gross Domestic Product (GDP). By 2023, the combined value added by agriculture, forestry, and fishing had declined to approximately 0.7% of GDP.

== Land agriculture ==
Despite its arid climate and limited arable land, the UAE has made significant strides in agricultural development. The total cultivable land was around 70,000 hectares in the early 1990s. As of 2021, arable land constituted a small percentage of the country's total land area.

The main farming regions include Digdaga in Ras al-Khaimah, Falaj al Mualla in Umm al-Qawain, Wadi adh Dhayd in Sharjah, Al Awir in Dubai, and the coastal areas of Al Fujairah. Date palms dominate cultivation, with approximately 4 million trees recorded in the early 1990s. The government has historically supported agriculture through subsidies on fertilizers, seeds, and pesticides, as well as providing loans for machinery and technical assistance. However, challenges such as limited ploughed land, high temperatures, periodic locust swarms, and water scarcity persist. Over-extraction of groundwater has led to significant drops in water tables and increased soil salinity, forcing some farms to cease production.

Between 1979 and 1985, agricultural production increased sixfold. Nevertheless, the UAE imported about 70 percent of its food requirements in the early 1990s. The major vegetable crops, supplying nearly all the country's needs during the season, are tomatoes, cabbage, eggplant, squash, and cauliflower. Ras al-Khaimah produces most of the country's vegetables. In addition to dates, the major fruit crops are citrus and mangoes. A vegetable canning facility in Al Ain has a processing capacity of 120 tons per day.

Poultry farms provided 70 percent of local requirements for eggs and 45 percent of poultry meat needed in 1989. Local dairies produced more than 73,000 tons of milk in 1991, meeting 92 percent of domestic demand.

In recent years, the UAE has embraced agricultural technology (AgriTech) to enhance food security and reduce reliance on imports, which account for about 85% of its food consumption. In 2022, 36% of AgriTech companies in the UAE focused on indoor farming solutions. Madar Farms, located in the Khalifa Economic Zones Abu Dhabi (KEZAD), utilizes vertical and hydroponic farming techniques to produce leafy greens, emphasizing sustainability and water conservation. Additionally, Scottish vertical farming specialist Intelligent Growth Solutions has partnered with ReFarm Global on a project within the UAE's Food Tech Valley initiative. This 900,000-square-foot farm aims to produce over 3 million kilograms of food annually, contributing to import reduction.

== Fishing ==
Fishing has been a traditional livelihood along the UAE's coast. Government support includes subsidies on fishing equipment and the establishment of marine workshops offering free repair and maintenance services. Cooperatives assist fishermen in marketing their catch. In 1989, the total catch was 91,160 tons, supplying most local demand. However, by the 2010s, fish imports were valued at US$624 million, while exports stood at about US$100 million, indicating a substantial reliance on imports to meet domestic consumption.

The UAE's seafood market has experienced growth, with revenues projected to reach US$1.38 billion in 2025 and US$1.46 billion by 2030, reflecting a compound annual growth rate (CAGR) of 1.21%. Despite this growth, domestic fish production has faced challenges. In 2023, Emirati fish production was approximately 2,850 metric tons, with projections indicating a modest increase to 2,960 metric tons by 2028, representing an annual growth rate of 0.6%.

== Food security concerns ==
To address food security concerns, the UAE has engaged in international partnerships. In November 2024, during the COP29 climate summit, the United States and the UAE announced an increase in funding for their joint climate-friendly farming initiative, AIM for Climate, bringing the total to $29.2 billion. This program aims to mitigate agriculture's climate impact and enhance resilience to global warming.
