= Omar Al Olama =

Emirati politician (born 1990)

Omar Sultan Al Olama
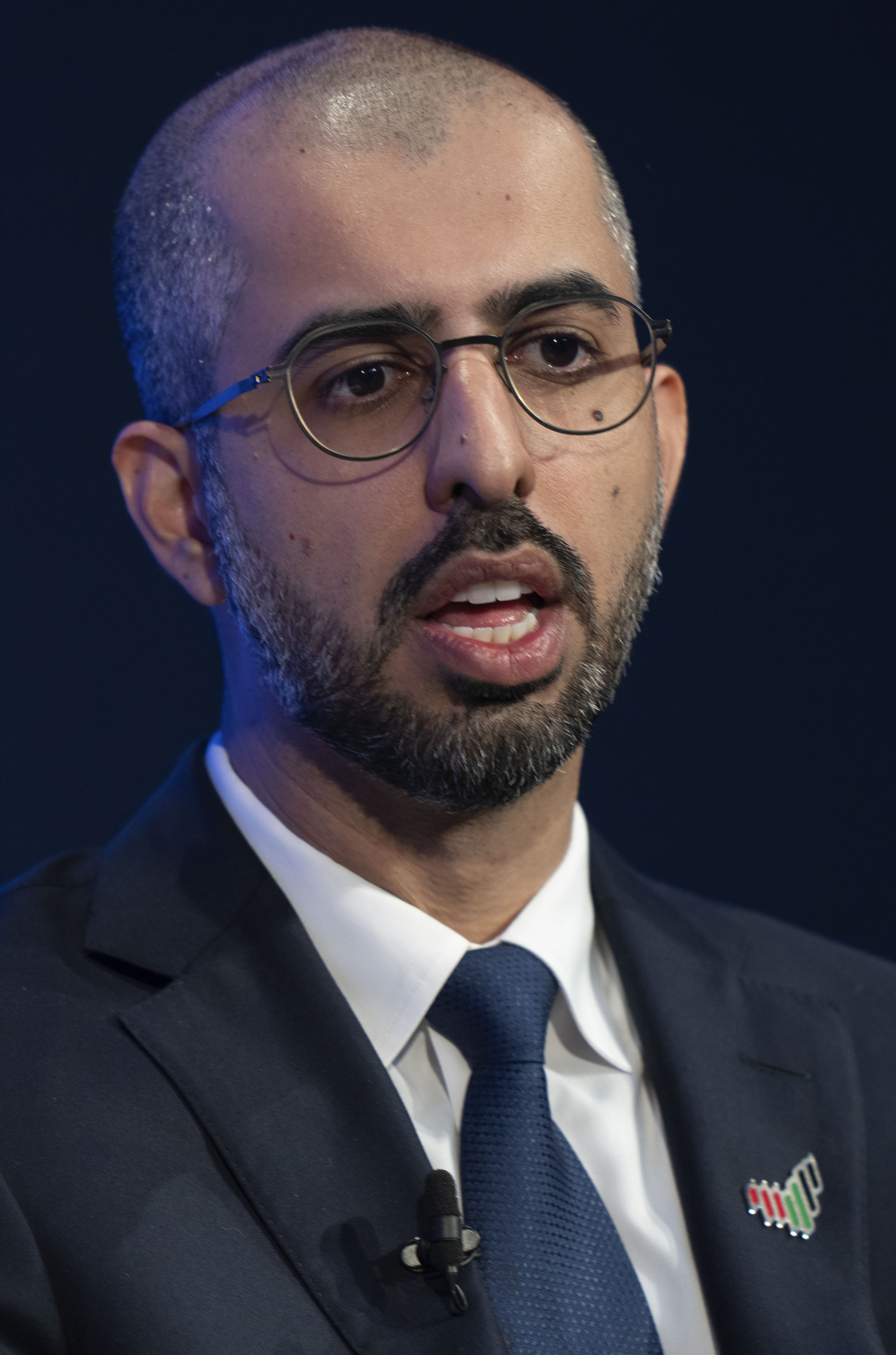
- Omar Sultan Al Olama in 2023

Minister of State for Artificial Intelligence, Digital Economy and Remote Work Applications (Note: When Al Olama was sworn in, his title was listed as the Minister of State for Digital Economy, Artificial Intelligence and Remote Work Applications but it is currently listed as the Minister of State for Artificial Intelligence, Digital Economy and Remote Work Applications on the United Arab Emirates Cabinet's website)
- Incumbent
- Assumed office 11 July 2020
- President: Khalifa bin Zayed Al Nahyan Mohamed bin Zayed Al Nahyan
- Prime Minister: Mohammed bin Rashid Al Maktoum
- Preceded by: Position established

Minister of State for Artificial Intelligence
- In office 20 October 2017 – 11 July 2020
- President: Khalifa bin Zayed Al Nahyan
- Prime Minister: Mohammed bin Rashid Al Maktoum
- Preceded by: Position established
- Succeeded by: Position abolished

Personal details
- Born: 16 February 1990 (age 36) Dubai, United Arab Emirates
- Education: American University in Dubai; American University in Sharjah

Omar Sultan Al Olama (Arabic: عمر سلطان العلماء; born 16 February 1990) is Minister of State for Artificial Intelligence, Digital Economy, and Remote Work Applications in the United Arab Emirates. He was appointed in October 2017 by Vice President and Prime Minister of the UAE and Ruler of Dubai, Sheikh Mohammed bin Rashid Al Maktoum. The UAE was the first country to appoint a minister for artificial intelligence.

== Early life and education ==
Al Olama was born on 16 February 1990 in Dubai. He has a bachelor's degree in Business and Administration and Management from the American University in Dubai, and a Diploma in Excellence and Project Management from the American University in Sharjah.

== Career ==
Between February 2012 and May 2014, Al Olama was member of the corporate planning at the UAE's Prime Minister's Office. From November 2015 to November 2016, he was Deputy Head of Minister's Office at the UAE's Prime Minister's Office. Between December 2015 and October 2017, he was Secretary General of the World Organization of Racing Drones. In November 2017, he was appointed member of the Board of Trustees of Dubai Future Foundation and Deputy Managing Director of the Foundation. In July 2016, Al Olama was appointed the managing director, and later in 2021 appointed Vice-Chair of the World Government Summit. In 2021, Al Olama was appointed as the Chairman of the Dubai Chamber of Digital Economy, a sub-section of Dubai Chamber of Commerce and Industry.

During the cabinet reshuffle in 2023, Al Olama was appointed as the Director General of the Prime Minister's Office, concurrently maintaining his role as the Minister of State for Artificial Intelligence, Digital Economy and Remote Work Applications.

== Memberships ==
In November 2017, Al Olama was appointed as a member of the Future of Digital Economy and Society Council, part of the World Economic Forum (WEF). Later in 2023, the World Economic Forum selected Al Olama to join the steering committee of the AI Governance Alliance, a group comprising 10 global leaders in the digital and technological fields.

In 2019, Al Olama was appointed as Chair of the Advisory Board of the Mohamed bin Zayed University of Artificial Intelligence.

In 2022, Al Olama was appointed by the UAE Cabinet as Vice-Chair of the Higher Committee for Government Digital Transformation, and also appointed by the Government of Dubai as Vice-Chair of the Higher Committee for Future Technology. In 2022, Al Olama was appointed Chairman of the oversight committee of the Dubai Future District Fund. Since 2023, Al Olama has been on the High-Level Advisory Body on Artificial Intelligence.

In 2023, Al Olama, recognized as the world's first minister for artificial intelligence, was included in Time Magazine's inaugural list of the 100 most influential people in AI.
