= Corruption in the United Arab Emirates =

Corruption in the United Arab Emirates is perceived as having a relatively clean public sector in comparison with its neighbors. The United Arab Emirates, a federation of territories in an area in the Persian Gulf previously known as the Trucial Coast, was ranked 21st out of 182 in Transparency International's Corruption Perceptions Index for 2025. This high placement in the ranking, however, does not mean the UAE is corruption-free. There are persistent corruption cases as demonstrated in recent allegations of corruption in state-owned companies, public procurement, and illicit financial flows into the UAE's real estate market, among others.

== Corruption scandals ==
One of the biggest corruption cases in the UAE was uncovered in 2001 when Dr. Obaid Saqr Busit, the head of Dubai's customs department, was arrested for corrupt practices. Two of his aides and two Pakistani nationals were also implicated after a two-year investigation by the UAE government. The corruption charge involved abuse of power to illegally accumulate wealth. This scandal was particularly notable not only because of the seniority of the accused but also due to the hands-on approach on the case adopted by the ruler of Dubai, Sheikh Mohammed bin Rashid Al Maktoum. He was identified as one of the instigators of the investigation.

Corruption in the UAE's state-owned companies has also been a source of concern, particularly in the energy and financial sectors. In 2008, for example, former executives of Tamweel, a Dubai-controlled mortgage provider were arrested for graft and financial irregularities while in office. The corruption had cost the company more than $12 million. In the same year, high-ranking officials of Dubai Islamic Bank, one of the world's oldest Shariah-compliant institutions were also implicated in financial irregularities at Deyaar, the bank's real estate subsidiary. One of these officials, Saad Abdul Razak, has left the company and was then working for Investment Corporation of Dubai (ICD), the emirate's holding company for state-owned assets, during the arrest. The strong influence of high-ranking officials on state-owned enterprises has been blamed for the latter's susceptibility to corrupt practices. There are observers who also attribute this type of corruption to poorly paid bureaucrats at the municipal level, who had to augment their income with unofficial tips.

There are also occasional incidents of bribery, nepotism, and embezzlement, and abuse of power at the local level. This is demonstrated by cases of government contracts awarded to companies with close ties to local officials. These projects had been flagged for inflated costs, substandard work, and mismanagement.

== Anti-corruption measures ==
The UAE government has adopted a zero-tolerance policy for corruption both in the public and private sectors. This policy, among other anti-corruption measures, was introduced as part of a concerted effort among Gulf countries to address corruption after the Arab Spring. The UAE created the UAE Accountability Authority (UAEAA), which is tasked to protect public funds, ensuring its lawful allocation and spending. This agency augmented the Anti-Corruption Unit, an agency within the Defense Ministry tasked with investigating corruption cases within the public sector. UAEAA is also mandated to facilitate the implementation of the United Nations Convention Against Corruption. Aside from the UAEAA, the UAE also passed various laws that promote accountability. The country's Supreme Audit Institution, for example, was restructured by the Federal Law No. 8 of 2011. This update empowered the agency to detect and prevent financial corruption.

The legal framework that addresses corruption includes the UAE Penal Code, which provides severe punishment for public officials who are found guilty of corrupt practices. While bribery, for example, is not specifically defined in the penal code, it is criminalized in Articles 234 to 239 and is treated the same under the respective penal codes of some of the individual emirates. In 2021, this law was updated with the introduction of the New UAE Federal Penal Code, which contains the Federal Law No. 31 of 2021 – as amended through the Law No. 36 of 2022. This is the main legislation that addresses bribery and corruption. The UAE also has an anti-money laundering law, which was ratified in May 2002. This legislation has created a culture of reporting obligations on the part of financial institutions. The law also authorized the Central Bank to freeze suspected accounts without prior legal authorization.

=== Challenges ===
The impact of the anti-corruption measures has had some level of success. However, there are still key challenges. For example, while the legal framework can serve as a deterrent for corrupt practices, there is still the issue of transparency. Access to information about business and political practices is very limited due to severe censorship in the country. Its adverse impact is seen in the case of public procurement, which has been tagged as a sector that has a higher risk of corruption stemming from the tendency for public and private affairs to overlap. The recent boom in the real estate industry has also created loopholes in the country’s anti-money laundering law, which has already been flagged for its slow implementation.

== International rankings ==
In 2012, the World Bank Governance Indicators, ranked the UAE 35th and 36th out of 215 economies in terms of government effectiveness and culture of corruption, respectively.

In Transparency International's 2025 Corruption Perceptions Index, the UAE scored 69 on a scale from 0 ("highly corrupt") to 100 ("very clean"). When ranked by score, the UAE ranked 21st among the 182 countries in the Index, where the country ranked first is perceived to have the most honest public sector. For comparison with regional scores, the UAE's score of 69 was the best score among Middle Eastern and North African countries, (Note: Algeria, Bahrain, Egypt, Iran, Iraq, Israel, Jordan, Kuwait, Lebanon, Libya, Morocco, Oman, Qatar, Saudi Arabia, Syria, Tunisia, United Arab Emirates, and Yemen) the average score was 39 and the worst score was 13. For comparison with worldwide scores, the best score was 89 (ranked 1), the average score was 42, and the worst score was 9 (ranked 181 in a two-way tie).
