= Dubai housing crash in 2009 =

2009 economic crisis in Dubai

2009 Dubai housing crash was a major economic crisis that hit the Emirate of Dubai, one of the seven emirates that make up the United Arab Emirates (UAE). The crisis was sparked by the 2008 financial crisis, which severely impacted Dubai's economy, particularly its real estate sector. The crisis was caused by several factors, including oversupply, speculation, and easy credit.

== Background ==
In 2006-2007 Dubai's economy was actively developing, driven largely by its real estate and construction industries. The government of Dubai had invested heavily in infrastructure projects, such as the Palm Jumeirah and the Burj Dubai, the tallest building in the world. In addition, Dubai had become a hub for international business and tourism.

However, the 2008 financial crisis had a severe impact on Dubai's economy. House prices in the Desert Sheikh fell an incredible 40% in the first three months of 2009, outpacing the fall anywhere else in the world after the investment bubble burst. The crisis led to a decrease in demand for property in Dubai, causing property prices to fall. This decline in property prices led to a chain reaction, as many investors who had purchased property in Dubai using loans were unable to repay their debts, leading to defaults and foreclosures.

== Causes ==
=== Oversupply ===
Dubai's real estate market had become oversupplied, with a large number of new properties being built to meet the increasing demand. However, during the 2008 financial crisis, demand for property in Dubai decreased, leading to an oversupply of properties that were difficult to sell.

=== Speculation ===
Many investors had purchased property in Dubai with the intention of selling it for a profit. This speculative buying led to a real-estate bubble, which eventually became unsustainable.

=== Easy credit ===
The availability of easy credit had led to a large number of people taking out loans to invest in property. However, with the decrease in demand for property, many investors were unable to repay their debts, leading to defaults and foreclosures.

== Impact ==
Property prices fell by as much as 60% in particular areas, and many investors who had purchased property with loans were unable to repay their debts, leading to defaults and foreclosures. The crisis also had a ripple effect on other sectors of Dubai's economy, as businesses that were dependent on the real estate and construction industries also suffered.

The Dubai government was forced to take measures to address the crisis, including providing financial support to developers and implementing regulations to prevent oversupply in the future. The crisis led to a renewed focus on diversifying Dubai's economy, with a greater emphasis on sectors such as tourism, trade, and finance. After the collapse of the real estate market in 2009, various reforms were carried out in Dubai, including tightening credit limits for buyers.
