= Dubai Islamic Bank fraud case =

- Date: 2004-7
- Location: Dubai, UAE
- Cause: Fraud
- Outcome: Embezzlement of US$501 million
- Accused: Ryan Cornelius
- Charges: Fraud
- Verdict: Guilty
- Convictions: 6 men sentenced to terms up to 30 years

The Dubai Islamic Bank (DIB) fraud case was a case originally brought in 2008 that involved the alleged embezzlement of 1.8 billion Dirhams (approximately US$501 million or £330 million) by a group of six (originally seven) bank executives and expat businessmen over the period 2004-2007.

The case was the largest alleged fraud case in the history of Dubai, and the ten-year jail sentences passed on the alleged perpetrators of the scheme were also the longest that Dubai authorities have ever passed in a fraud case. As of 2018, four of the alleged perpetrators remain in jail after having their sentences extended by another 20 years.

== The loan ==
In 2004 the Dubai Islamic Bank extended US$500 million in credit to CCH, an investment firm, which was proposed to be invested by CCH in the Indus Refinery Project, a plan to dismantle and move an oil refinery from Canada to Pakistan, where it was to be reassembled and used to supply Pakistan with refined petroleum products. According to the Dubai Government Financial Audit Department (FAD) the credit was offered on the recommendation of two Pakistani bank executives who had been bribed by representatives of CCH, respectively receiving payments of $950,000 and $750,000.

According to FAD, false receipts showing investment of the loan were provided to DIB, and the money was diverted into four other companies.
