= Taxation in the United Arab Emirates =

Taxation in the United Arab Emirates flows through the Federal Tax Authority. The nation has a 5% value added tax on many goods, an excise tax on certain categories of products, and a corporate tax rate of up to 9%.

== History ==
Since the discovery of oil in the UAE in the mid-1960s, the UAE federal and local governments had no incentive to levy direct taxes. Local governments received royalties from their emirate-owned oil companies, which local governments used to fund the federal government. Since then, the UAE is working to diversify its economy and government revenue away from oil and other hydrocarbons; with taxes being a major source for diversifying government-revenue sources.

== Responsibilities and Functions ==
Tax administration: the FTA administers various taxes implemented in the UAE, including Value Added Tax (VAT), Excise Tax, and Corporate Tax. This includes the registration of taxpayers, collection of taxes, and processing of tax returns.

Compliance and Enforcement: The FTA monitors compliance with tax laws through audits and inspections. It ensures that businesses and individuals adhere to the regulatory requirements and addresses any issues of non-compliance.

The Federal Tax Authority (FTA) is the government agency responsible for the administration and regulation of tax laws in the United Arab Emirates (UAE).

== Taxation Types in the United Arab Emirates ==
=== Value Added Tax (VAT) ===
The UAE has implemented a federal Value Added Tax (VAT) with a standard rate of 5%. Some items are taxed at 0%, while others are exempt. Businesses with annual taxable supplies exceeding the AED 375,000 threshold must register for VAT, while those with supplies above AED 187,500 may register voluntarily. The Federal Tax Authority (FTA) oversees VAT collection and audits businesses to ensure compliance.

=== Excise Tax ===
Excise Tax in the UAE: Overview and Purpose

Excise tax in the UAE was introduced by the Federal Tax Authority (FTA) in October 2017 to help curb the consumption of products detrimental to public health and the environment. It is a form of indirect tax levied on specific goods, focusing on items like tobacco products, carbonated beverages, energy drinks, and sweetened drinks. By increasing the prices of these products, the government aims to discourage consumption, promote healthier lifestyles, and reduce environmental harm.

==== Products Subject to Excise Tax ====
The FTA applies excise tax at varying rates depending on the product category:

- Tobacco and tobacco products: A 100% excise tax is levied on cigarettes, shisha tobacco, and other tobacco-related products.
- Energy drinks: These are also taxed at 100%, encompassing any beverages marketed as providing energy due to ingredients like caffeine or taurine.
- Carbonated drinks: A 50% tax is imposed on carbonated beverages, with an exemption for beverages that do not contain sugar or other sweeteners.
- Sweetened beverages: Introduced later, these beverages (including juices, sodas, or powdered drink mixes) are taxed at 50% if they contain added sugars or sweeteners.

This approach aligns with the government's public health strategy, addressing the growing concerns of obesity, diabetes, and other health risks.

==== Compliance and Registration ====
Businesses involved in producing, importing, or distributing excise goods are required to register with the FTA, ensuring that they meet excise tax obligations. The registration process includes warehouse management, where businesses store excise goods under specific conditions to defer tax payments. Additionally, businesses must file periodic excise tax returns and pay the due tax within the stipulated timeframes. Failure to comply results in penalties, which are part of the FTA's effort to enforce transparent and accountable tax practices.

==== Impact of Excise Tax ====
The introduction of excise tax in the UAE has generated significant revenue for the government while encouraging healthier consumer habits. The higher prices have reduced the consumption of taxed items, particularly among younger demographics, contributing to improved public health outcomes. Revenue generated from excise tax has been directed towards funding healthcare initiatives and other public services, reinforcing the government's long-term objectives for health and sustainability.

=== Corporate Tax ===
Corporate Tax (CT) is a form of direct tax levied on the net income or profit of corporations and other businesses. Corporate Tax is also referred to as “Corporate Income Tax” or “Business Profits Tax” in other jurisdictions. The UAE has introduced a competitive Corporate Tax regime based on international best practices that aligns with the UAE's position as a leading global hub for business and investment and accelerate the UAE's development and transformation to achieve its strategic objectives. Introducing a Corporate Tax regime also reaffirms the UAE's commitment to meeting international standards for tax transparency and preventing harmful tax practices.

==== When will the UAE Corporate Tax regime become effective? ====
The UAE Corporate Tax Regime became effective for financial years starting on or after 1 June 2023.

==== What is the Corporate Tax Rate? ====
Corporate Tax is to be applied on the Taxable Income.

Taxable Income should be calculated by conducting relevant adjustments to the Accounting Income for that Tax Period.

- 0% for Taxable Income not exceeding AED 375,000.
- 9% for Taxable Income exceeding AED 375,000.
- 0% Corporate Tax Rate applies to certain persons meeting conditions for Qualifying Free Zone Person.
- No Corporate Tax for companies eligible to claim Small Business Relief.

==== Which expenses are deductible for Corporate Tax purposes? ====
All expenditures wholly and exclusively incurred for the purpose of business (which are not capital in nature), are generally allowed as deductible expenditure. Notable exceptions include any costs of entertaining clients.

==== Who will be subject to UAE Corporate Tax? ====
UAE Corporate Tax applies to the following:

- Juridical persons that are incorporated in the UAE or foreign juridical persons that are effectively managed and controlled in the UAE.
- Non-Resident persons that have a Permanent Establishment or State Sourced income in the UAE.
- Non-resident juridical persons that have a nexus in the UAE by virtue of earning income from Immovable Property in the UAE.
- Natural Persons who conduct Business or Business Activities in the UAE and have a Turnover of over AED 1,000,000 per Gregorian calendar year from such Business or Business Activities.

==== Who is exempt from Corporate Tax? ====
- Government Entities.
- Government Controlled Entities and Qualifying Public Benefit Entities.
- Extractive Businesses and Non-Extractive Natural Resource Businesses.
- Public and private pension or social security funds.
- Qualifying Investment Funds.
- Juridical persons incorporated in the UAE that are wholly owned and controlled by certain Exempt Persons.
- Any other Person as may be determined in a decision issued by the Cabinet at the suggestion of the Minister.

==== What are the Corporate Tax compliance requirements? ====
- Taxable Persons to file annual Corporate Tax Return within nine months from the end of the Tax Period. However, a Taxable Person eligible to claim Small Business Relief may file a simplified Corporate Tax Return.
- Exempt Persons to file annual declarations confirming they continue to meet exemption conditions.
- All persons must comply with Arm's Length Principles (Taxable or Exempt Person).

=== Who should Register for Taxation in the UAE? ===
The UAE's taxation system includes Value Added Tax (VAT) and Corporate Tax, and businesses and individuals must meet certain criteria to register.

Below are the persons required to register for Taxes:

- Companies, sole proprietors, and freelancers who provide taxable goods or services.
- Importers and exporters dealing in taxable goods.
- Online and e-commerce businesses meeting the threshold.
- Any person having a license to conduct business activity in the UAE.

== Value Added Tax (VAT) Registration Criteria ==
=== Mandatory Registration ===
A business must register for VAT if their taxable supplies and imports exceed the mandatory registration threshold of AED375,000. Furthermore, a business may choose to register for VAT voluntarily if their supplies and imports or expenses are less than the mandatory registration threshold, but exceed the voluntary registration threshold of AED187,500. This latter opportunity to register voluntarily is designed to enable start-up businesses with no turnover to register for VAT.

=== Exemption from Registration ===
Businesses with annual turnover below AED 187,500 are exempt and do not need to register for VAT.

== Corporate Tax Registration for Individuals ==
All taxpayers, as prescribed by the Minister, will be required to register for UAE CT and obtain a Corporate Tax Registration Number. The Federal Tax Authority may also request certain Exempt Persons to register for UAE CT.

=== VAT refunds for tourists ===
Foreign tourists visiting the UAE are entitled to VAT refunds for purchases of items being exported with the traveler on their departure. The refund only applied to items that have not been used in the UAE. The minimum receipt requirement for VAT refunds is AED250 (US$68), and the purchase needs to be made within 90 days of departure.

=== Who is eligible for tax free refund? ===
“Overseas tourist” means any natural person who is 18 years old or above, who is not a crew member on a flight or on an aircraft or cruise ship leaving an Implementing State and who is not a resident in the UAE. Under current rules, GCC Nationals not residing in the UAE are also eligible. Please note that there may be restrictions for the UAE nationals residing abroad for the purpose of studying.

=== What goods are eligible for tax free shopping? ===
Certain taxable goods except for:

- Goods that have been consumed, fully or partially, in the UAE.
- Motor vehicles, boats, and aircraft.
- Goods that are not accompanied by the overseas tourist at the time of leaving the UAE.
- Services.

== See also ==
- Salik, road toll system in the UAE.
