= List of government-owned companies of the United Arab Emirates =

This is a list of government-owned companies of the United Arab Emirates. A government-owned corporation is a legal entity that undertakes commercial activities on behalf of an owner government. Their legal status varies from being a part of government to stock companies with a state as a regular stockholder. There is no standard definition of a government-owned corporation (GOC) or state-owned enterprise (SOE), although the two terms can be used interchangeably. The defining characteristics are that they have a distinct legal form, they are established to operate in commercial affairs and owned by the government. While they may also have public policy objectives, GOCs should be differentiated from other forms of government agencies or state entities established to pursue purely non-financial objectives.

== Government-owned companies of the United Arab Emirates ==
- Aabar Investments
- Abu Dhabi Investment Council
- Abu Dhabi Ports Company
- Abu Dhabi Terminals
- Abu Dhabi National Oil Company
- Arab Media Group
- Arabian Television Network
- Creative City
- Daman, National Health Insurance Company
- DP World
- DSV Solutions PJSC - (Abu Dhabi)
- Dubai Holding
- Dubai Inc.
- Dubai Internet City
- Dubai Knowledge Village
- Dubai Lifestyle City
- Dubai Media City
- Dubai Royal Air Wing
- Dubai Silicon Oasis
- Dubai World
- Dubai World Central - Al Maktoum International Airport
- Dubailand
- EDGE Group
- Electronic Documents Centre
- Emirates Credit Information Company(Emcredit)
- Emirates (airline)
- Emirates National Oil Company
- Emirates Global Aluminium
- Emirates Post
- Empower Energy Solutions
- Etihad Airways
- Etihad Credit Insurance
- Flydubai
- Green Crescent Insurance Company (GCC)
- International Petroleum Investment Company
- Investment Corporation of Dubai (ICD)
- Kizad
- Leisurecorp
- Majan
- Mubadala Investment Company
- Presidential Flight (UAE)
- Ras Al Khaimah IT Park
- Ras Al Khaimah Media Free Zone
- Sharjah National Oil Corporation
- SHOOFtv
- Tatweer

== See also ==
- Jebel Ali Free Zone
- List of free Trade Zones in Dubai
- List of Free Trade Zones in UAE
- List of government-owned companies
- Lists of companies (category}
- State ownership

== Bibliography ==
- Profiles of Existing Government Corporations—A Study Prepared by the U.S. General Accounting Office for the Committee on Government Operations (PDF), Washington, DC: U.S. Government Printing Office, 1988, p. 301, GAO/AFMD-89-43FS Document: H402-4. Alternate location:
