= Emirates business model =

Airline business model

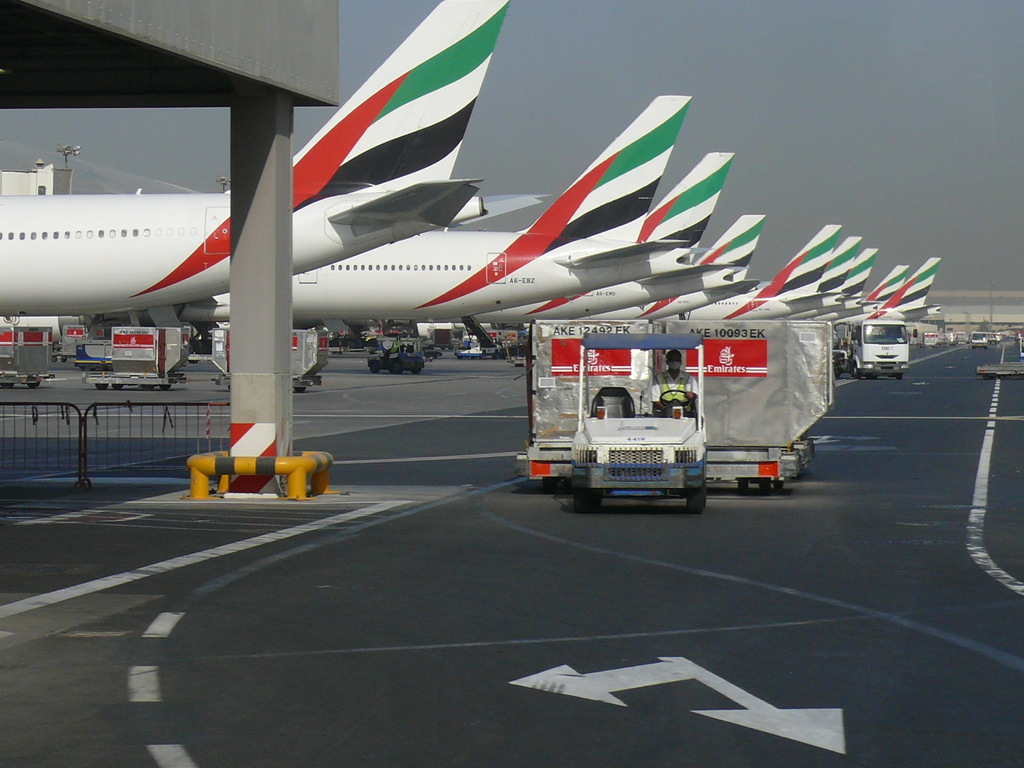
Emirates aircraft parked at Dubai International Airport

The "Emirates business model" is the business model that fuels Emirates's commercial success. Its main ingredients are a lean workforce comparable to a low-cost carrier and a flat organisational structure that allows the airline to maintain low overhead costs.

Some industry analysts believe the airline is second only to Ryanair on a cash cost per seat basis due to lower operating costs at its Dubai base. This enables it to serve secondary destinations profitably by connecting these via its global hub in Dubai.

Emirates has not joined any global airline alliance (although they planned to join Star Alliance in 2000, but remained independent), stating that unless an airline is the lead participant in such an alliance – e.g. Lufthansa in the Star Alliance or Air France in SkyTeam – individual alliance members' freedom of action is compromised by the imposition of common alliance goals that mainly serve the interests of the alliance leaders.

Since 1995, Emirates had operated an all-widebody fleet, largely composed of Airbus A380s and Boeing 777s. This results in lower unit costs compared to other large airlines operating a mix of narrow- and widebody fleets and allows the airline to use the aircraft's cargo capacity to increase its revenues and total profits. Since Dubai International Airport does not have any night flying restrictions, Emirates achieves a higher utilisation of its aircraft than competitors. It also has lower staff costs than longer established rivals, because in Dubai there are no unions and there is an abundance of cheap labour.

== Accusations of unfair competition ==
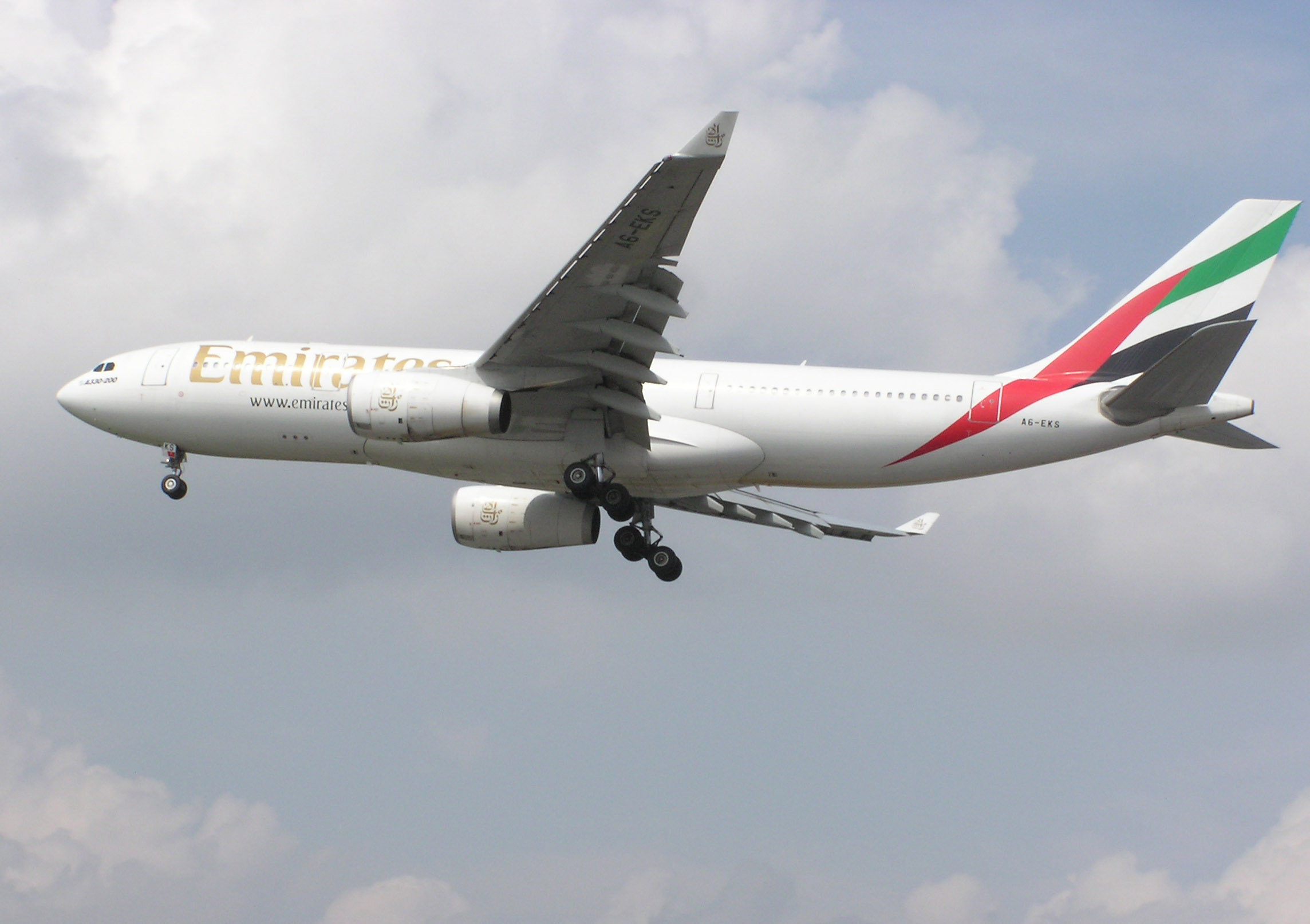
Emirates Airbus A330-200 (A6-EKS) landing at London Heathrow Airport

The established network carriers in Europe, North America and Australasia, i.e. Air France–KLM, Lufthansa, British Airways, Air Canada, Delta Air Lines, American Airlines, Qantas and Air New Zealand, perceive Emirates' strategic decision to reposition itself as a global carrier as a major threat because it allows air travellers to bypass traditional airline hubs such as London–Heathrow, Paris–Charles-de-Gaulle, Frankfurt and Amsterdam Schiphol on their way between Europe/North America and Asia/Oceania by changing flights in Dubai instead.

Some of these carriers, notably Air France, Delta and Qantas, have accused Emirates of receiving hidden state subsidies and of maintaining too close of a relationship with Dubai's airport authority and its aviation authority, both of which are also wholly state-owned entities that share the same government owner with the airline. They have also alleged that Emirates is able to reduce its borrowing costs below market rates by taking advantage of its government shareholders' sovereign borrower status. They have claimed that the government support cross-subsidises the airline, masking its true financial performance.

=== Fuel subsidies ===
Many airlines have accused Emirates of receiving fuel subsidies from the Government of Dubai. The airline has denied these accusations, stating that it purchases its fuel at the same price, as well as on the same terms and conditions, as every other commercial airline at all airports in which it operates. In FY 2007/08, fuel accounted for more than 30% of Emirates total expenditure, comparable with other international long-haul carriers such as British Airways, Lufthansa, Qantas and Singapore Airlines.

=== Airport user charges ===
Emirates has also defended itself against competitor accusations claiming it pays discounted airport user charges at its home base. The airline rejected these claims, stating that it paid the same user charges at Dubai as everyone else, which were similar to those prevailing at other comparable airports in the region, including Abu Dhabi, Doha, and Bahrain.

=== Local taxes ===
Many airlines have accused Emirates of having an unfair advantage, since it does not have to pay local taxes. The airline rejected these claims by clarifying that in the absence of income or corporate taxes in the UAE, all airlines operating to and from Dubai benefit from this tax-free environment. In this context, Emirates also stressed that it had paid the Government of Dubai dividends totaling US$776 million, in return for US$10 million in seed capital given to the airline at its inception in 1985.

=== Fifth freedom traffic ===
Emirates robustly defends itself against recurring claims accusing it of stealing other airlines' transfer passengers. It points out that its detractors have carried international passenger traffic between different third country points on their networks via their hub airports for decades, and that Emirates is entitled to do the same. Emirates furthermore points out that this enables it to offer regional passengers based in or near important secondary cities such as Glasgow, Newcastle, Düsseldorf, Hamburg, Nice, Venice, Brisbane or Perth convenient, worldwide one-stop connections via its global hub in Dubai.

=== Relationship between Emirates and the Government of Dubai ===
Emirates has countered rivals' frequent accusations that its ownership by the Government of Dubai amounted to a direct subsidy, representing an unfair competitive advantage not enjoyed by most other airlines, by stating that it was a fully fledged commercial enterprise run at arm's length from the Dubai government, despite being wholly owned by it.

=== Labour cost advantages ===
Some airlines have claimed that being based in Dubai gives Emirates an unfair labour cost advantage over other airlines. Emirates has countered this by stating that it faces the same costs to attract and retain staff recruited from around the world on expatriate terms and conditions as other airlines. The airline points out that the total cost of expatriate employee benefits amounts to more than US$400 million per annum.

==== Canadian expansion ====
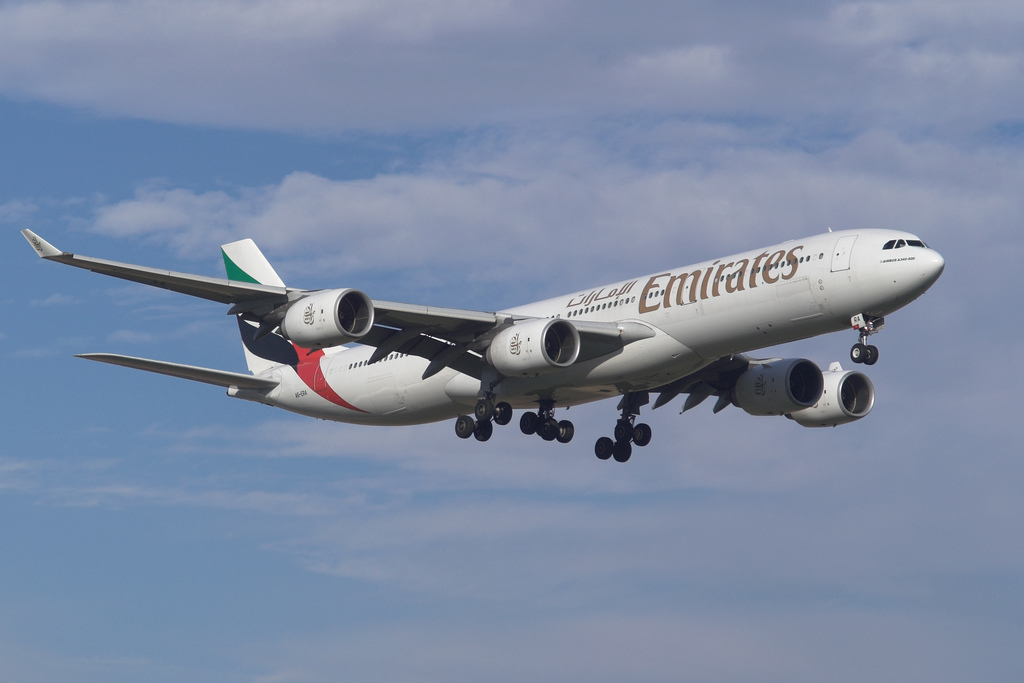
Emirates Airbus A340-500

Emirates started flying to Canada on 29 October 2007, operating three weekly non-stop services on the Dubai–Toronto route.

Emirates has experienced very high capacity factors on its Canadian services, averaging 90% since the start of operations between Toronto and Dubai. This resulted in the introduction of an Airbus A380 on the route, replacing the Boeing 777-300ER originally used. However, the current bilateral agreement between the UAE and Canada restricts Emirates to only three flights per week between Dubai and Canada. In addition to operating daily between Dubai and Toronto to give business and leisure passengers greater flexibility, the airline had plans to add Calgary, Montreal and Vancouver to its UAE–Canada schedule. The Canadian Government stated it does not see the need for more services in response to these requests.

The Canadian Government has claimed that Air Canada might be adversely affected by increased competition from Emirates and that this could undermine its viability. Emirates has refuted these claims, stating that there was no direct competitive overlap between it and Air Canada, since the latter (before 2015) did not operate services to the UAE or to any points in the Middle East, Africa or the Indian subcontinent, places where Emirates' flights experience high demand. Emirates also stated that this would benefit Air Canada as many of Emirates' Canadian passengers were transferring to/from points on Air Canada's extensive North American network through its Toronto hub.

In 2022, Air Canada and Emirates announced a strategic partnership, involving code-share routes and reciprocal frequent-flyer benefits and lounge access. Consequently, Air Canada announced a four-times weekly Vancouver-Dubai route while Emirates announced a daily Montreal-Dubai route starting in July 2023.

==== German expansion ====
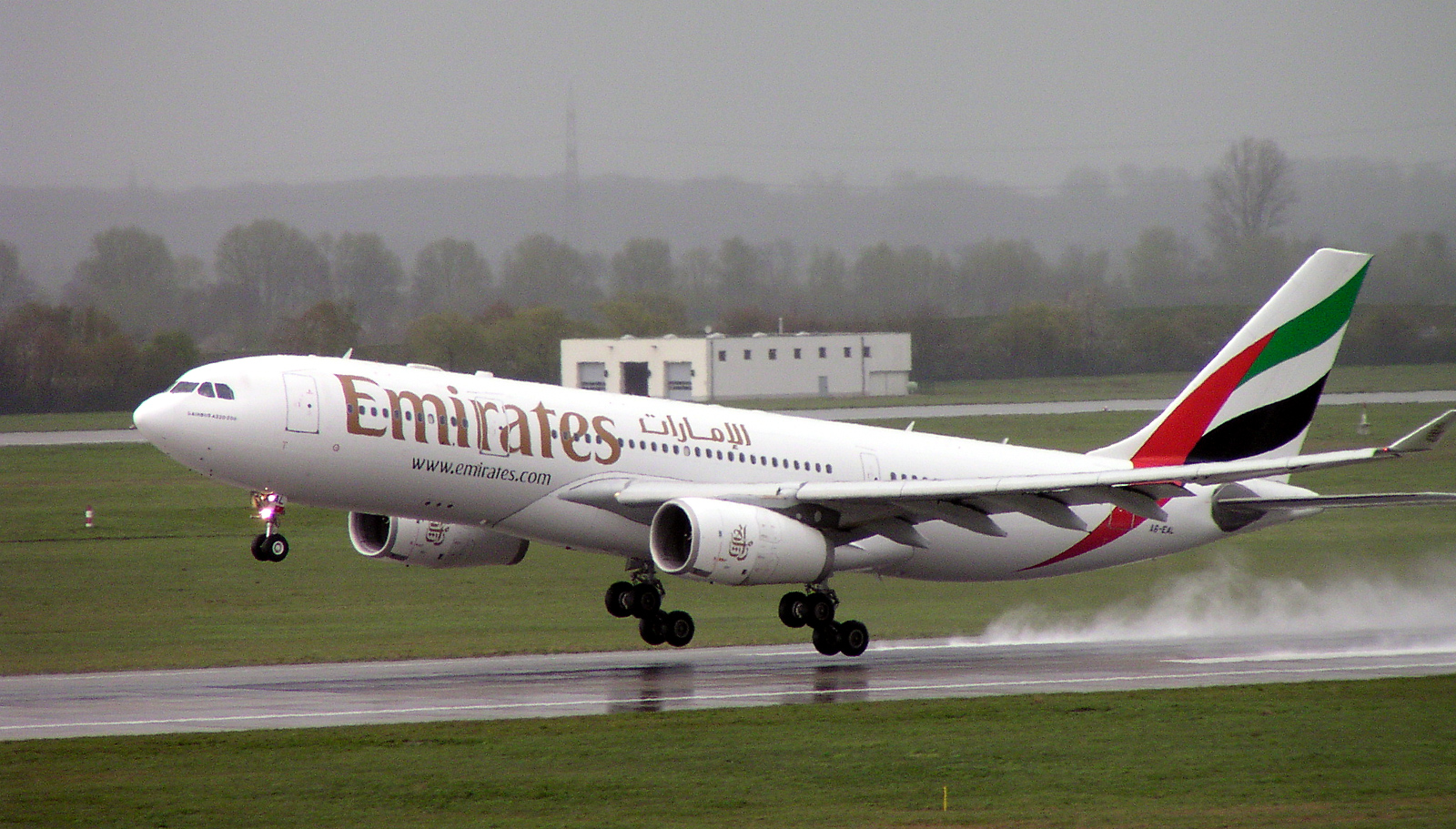
A330-200 taking off at Düsseldorf Airport

Emirates commenced flights to Germany in July 1987 with the launch of scheduled services on the Dubai–Frankfurt route. As of 2009, Emirates operates 49 weekly passenger flights from Dubai to Germany, serving Frankfurt, Munich, Düsseldorf and Hamburg. Emirates also operates eleven weekly all-cargo flights from Dubai to Germany. Germany is Emirates' second-biggest market in Europe (after the United Kingdom), carrying over one million passengers between Dubai and Germany during the 2007/08 financial year.

In March 2009, Lufthansa said that it saw a competitive imbalance between Emirates and itself in the Germany–Dubai air travel market, effectively accusing the UAE carrier of stealing its transfer passengers between North America, the Middle East, Africa, India and the Far East. It also alleged that there were material differences in handling fees at Dubai Airport and unequal opportunities for the two airlines in each other's home markets. The latter relates to Emirates' heavy reliance on so-called "sixth freedom" traffic rights that enable it to carry passengers, cargo and mail between Germany and third countries via its hub in Dubai to fill most of the space on its Germany–Dubai flights, as a result of there being insufficient origin and destination traffic.

Emirates has countered Lufthansa's claims by pointing out that its proposed German expansion would result in a "win-win" situation for both sides that would actually grow the German economy through additional economic activity generated, as a result of stimulating the air transport market between the two countries.

An order of Germany's Federal Office for Goods Transport to Emirates to desist from price leadership on routes leaving Germany for non–European-Union (EU) destinations and forcing it to raise relevant business class fares by up to 20% has been the focus of the latest disagreement between the UAE carrier on one hand and the German government and Lufthansa on the other. Despite the Federal Office for Goods Transport's insistence that it has not singled out Emirates unfairly by demanding similar remedial action of other airlines regarding fares charged on non-EU routes out of Germany, Andrew Parker, Emirates' senior vice-president, denied any knowledge of this being the case. He termed the German Federal Office for Goods Transport's decision "anti-consumer" and "commercially nonsensical". He also threatened to seek redress from the European Commission.

== See also ==
- Emirates
- Emirates fleet
