= Digdaga =

- Location within United Arab Emirates
- Coordinates: 25°41′00″N 55°57′51″E
- Country: United Arab Emirates
- Emirate: Ras Al Khaimah
- Elevation: 20 m (66 ft)

Population (2023)
  - Total: 6,131

Digdaga (Arabic: دقداقة also spelled "Diqdaqa") is a settlement and agricultural suburb of Ras Al Khaimah in the United Arab Emirates (UAE). It is notable as the location of the Al Sawan Camel Race Track as well as the eponymous Digdaga Dairy Farm. Races are held at Al Sawan every Friday morning from 6:30 to 9:30 am from October onwards into the winter season.

Digdaga is also the location of Julphar Pharmaceutical Industries as well as the Dhs40 million Rashid Omran Hospital. The area is served by the Digdaga Police Station.
