= Ministry of State for Artificial Intelligence, Digital Economy and Remote Work Applications =

Government ministry of the United Arab Emirates

- وزارة دولة للذكاء الاصطناعي والاقتصاد الرقمي وتطبيقات العمل عن بعد (Arabic)
- Logo of the Ministry of State for Artificial Intelligence, Digital Economy and Remote Work Applications

Ministry overview
- Formed: 2020; 5 years ago
- Jurisdiction: Federal government of the United Arab Emirates
- Headquarters: Abu Dhabi, United Arab Emirates
- Minister responsible: Omar Sultan Al Olama, Minister of State for Artificial Intelligence, Digital Economy, and Remote Work Applications
- Website: ai.gov.ae

The Ministry of State for Artificial Intelligence, Digital Economy and Remote Work Applications (Arabic: وزارة دولة للذكاء الاصطناعي والاقتصاد الرقمي وتطبيقات العمل عن بعد) is a government ministry in the United Arab Emirates (UAE) responsible for driving the country's artificial intelligence (AI) initiatives, fostering the digital economy, and implementing remote work applications. Established in 2020, it is part of the UAE's broader efforts to position itself as a global hub for technological innovation and economic diversification.

== History ==
The ministry was established in 2020 as part of the UAE's vision to embrace advanced technologies and build a knowledge-based economy. It plays a central role in implementing the UAE's Artificial Intelligence Strategy and supports various national and international efforts to integrate AI technologies across different sectors.

== Leadership ==
The ministry is led by Omar Sultan Al Olama, who was appointed Minister of State for Artificial Intelligence, Digital Economy, and Remote Work Applications in 2020. He has been a key figure in driving the UAE's efforts to become a global leader in AI governance and digital transformation.

== Key initiatives ==
=== UAE Charter for the Development and Use of AI ===
In July 2024, the ministry launched the UAE Charter for the Development and Use of AI. The charter outlines principles for the ethical development and use of AI technologies, aligning with the UAE's broader AI strategy.

=== International AI policy ===
In September 2024, the UAE sought closer AI and technology ties with the United States to strengthen its tech industry and gain greater access to advanced technologies.

In October 2024, the UAE Cabinet approved the country's stance on international AI governance. This policy reinforces the UAE's global leadership in AI and aligns with international frameworks on technology governance.
