= Al Gurg =

Al Gurg is a surname. Notable people with the surname include:

- Abdulla Fareed Al Gurg, United Arab Emirates businessman
- Easa Al-Gurg, United Arab Emirates businessman
- Easa Saleh Al Gurg (1927–2022), United Arab Emirates businessman
- Muna Al Gurg, United Arab Emirates businesswoman
- Raja Al Gurg, United Arab Emirates businesswoman
- Reem Saleh Al Gurg, Emirati author of children's literature

== See also ==
- Kamal al-Din Gurg (died 1315/16), general of the Delhi Sultanate
