= Mailbox Birmingham =

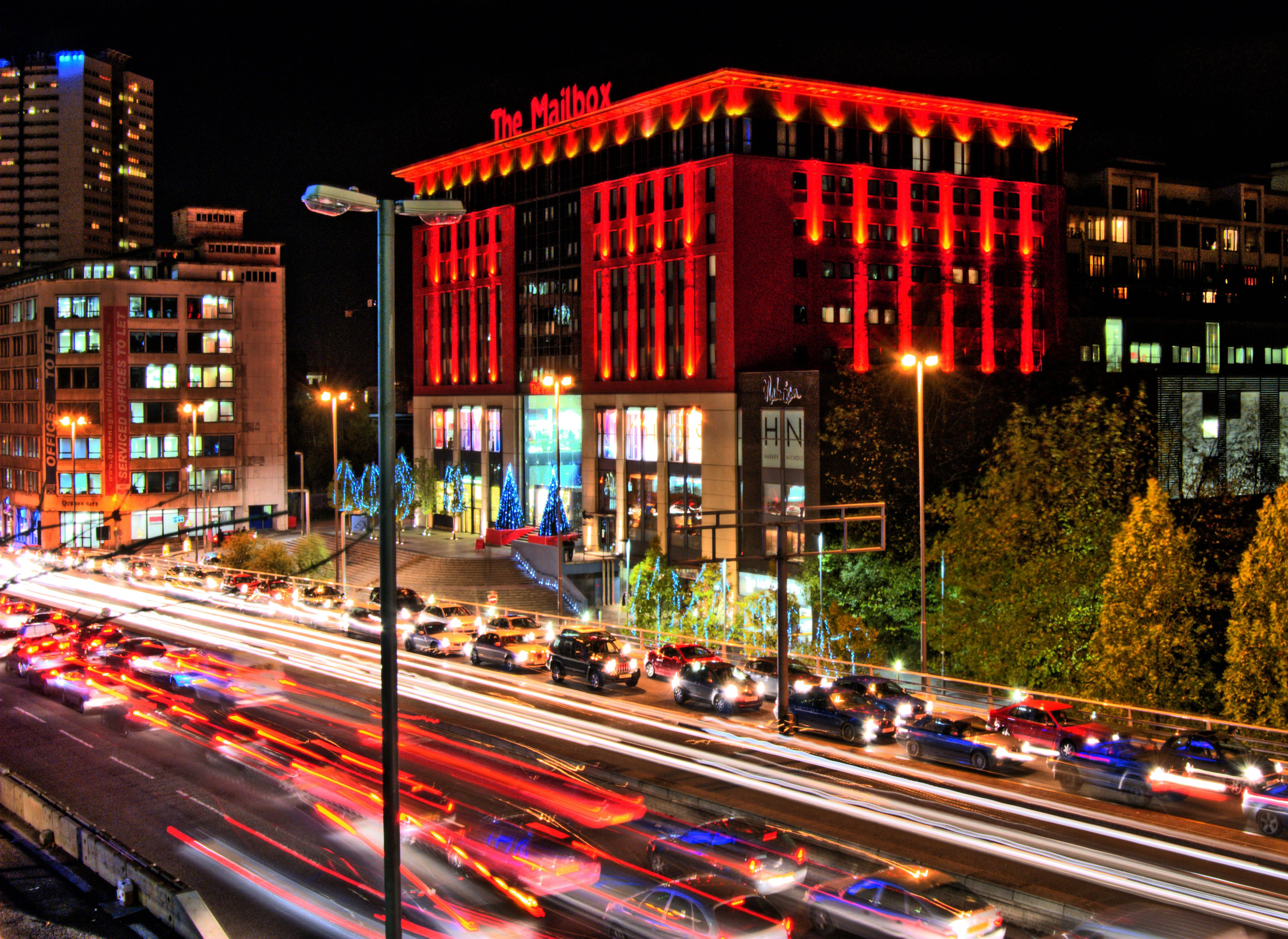
- Mailbox Birmingham from Suffolk Street Queensway
- Location: Birmingham, England
- Coordinates: 52°28′34″N 1°54′15″W
- Address: 7 Commercial Street
- Opened: December 2000
- Developer: Birmingham Development Company
- Owner: M7
- Architect: 1997 – Associated Architects; 2013 – Stanton Williams
- Num. of anchor tenants: 1 Harvey Nichols
- Floors: 6
- Parking: 686
- Website: mailboxlife.com

Mailbox Birmingham, also known as The Mailbox, is a mixed-use development located within the city centre of Birmingham, England. It houses British luxury department store chain Harvey Nichols, and the BBC Birmingham studios.

The scheme comprises 689,000 sq. ft. of primarily office space, with ancillary retail and leisure offering, located on a 4.8-acre waterside site. It is home to BBC Birmingham, WSP, Associated Architects, Harvey Nichols, Malmaison Birmingham and other leading stores and restaurants.

The Mailbox is about 300 metres (980 ft) long from front to back including The Cube. Above the front shops it has an additional six floors which includes a hotel and residential apartments. The Worcester and Birmingham Canal passes along the back with a number of restaurants overlooking. To the front it faces a flyover of the Suffolk Street Queensway road, with an underpass leading to Birmingham New Street railway station.

== History ==
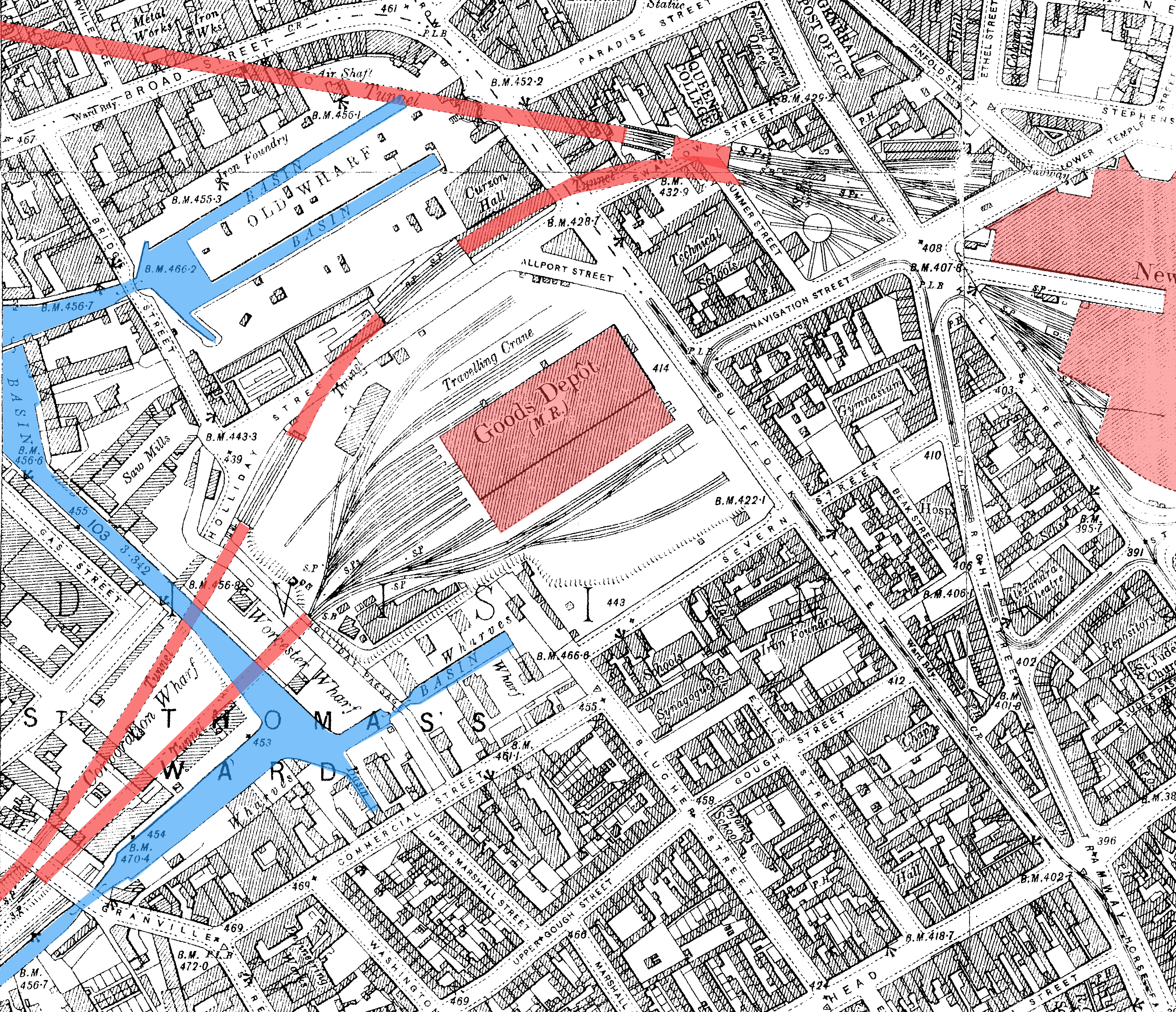
The Mailbox was built on the white area just below the Central Goods Depot on this map.

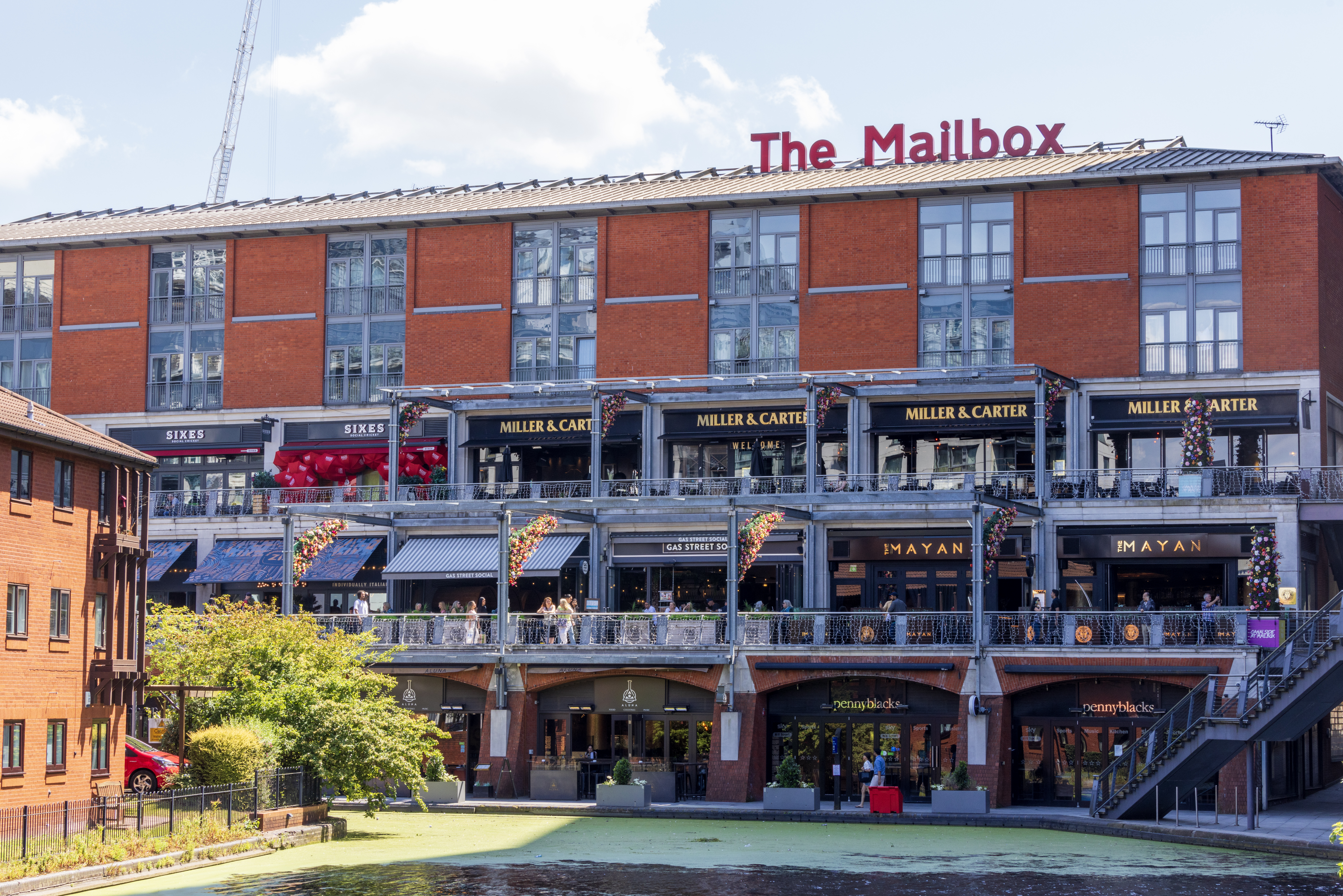
Restaurants at the canal side of the Mailbox

Post Office (Subway) Act 1966 (Note: Section 7(1).)
- Act of Parliament
- Parliament of the United Kingdom
- Long title: An Act to authorise the Postmaster General to construct a subway in the City of Birmingham.
- Citation: 1966 c. 25
- Territorial extent: United Kingdom

Dates
- Royal assent: 3 August 1966
- Commencement: 3 August 1966 (Note: The Acts of Parliament (Commencement) Act 1793.)

Status: Current legislation

Text of statute as originally enacted

Previously the location of a railway goods yard with canal wharves off the Worcester and Birmingham Canal leading to Gas Street Basin, the site was the location of the Royal Mail's main sorting office building for Birmingham (hence its current name) which was completed in 1970, replacing the Victorian head post office (now Victoria Square House), in Victoria Square. The new building was designed by R. H. Ousman of the Ministry of Public Building and Works, who collaborated with project architect H. A. E. Giddings and with Hubbard Ford & Partners, who supplied E. Winters and R. Lee as architects. When completed, it was the largest mechanised letters and parcels sorting office in the country with a floor area of 20 acres (81,000 m^{2}) and the largest building in Birmingham. A tunnel was authorised by the Post Office (Subway) Act 1966 (c. 25) and constructed under Severn Street between the site and New Street railway station, allowing electric tractors hauling carts carrying sacks of mail to be driven directly to the office. The structure housed the largest electronic sorting equipment in the West Midlands to handle the post. It also housed the administrative teams moved from Victoria Square, including those for other Post Office functions, such as counter services.

The main entrance was located at Blucher Street beneath a tower set between a square block for parcels on the left and a lower block for the letters sorting office on the right. The structure consisted of a steel frame on a 40-foot (12 m) square grid with lightweight pre-cast concrete floor slabs and reinforced concrete retaining walls and sub floors. The exterior was clad with cast glass troughs and exposed aggregate panels. Ventilation was provided through air-handling units which provided the building with the temperature it required. Extract fans were also placed on the roof. The exterior consisted mainly of the glass slabs and projecting air handling units with recessed windows.

=== Construction ===
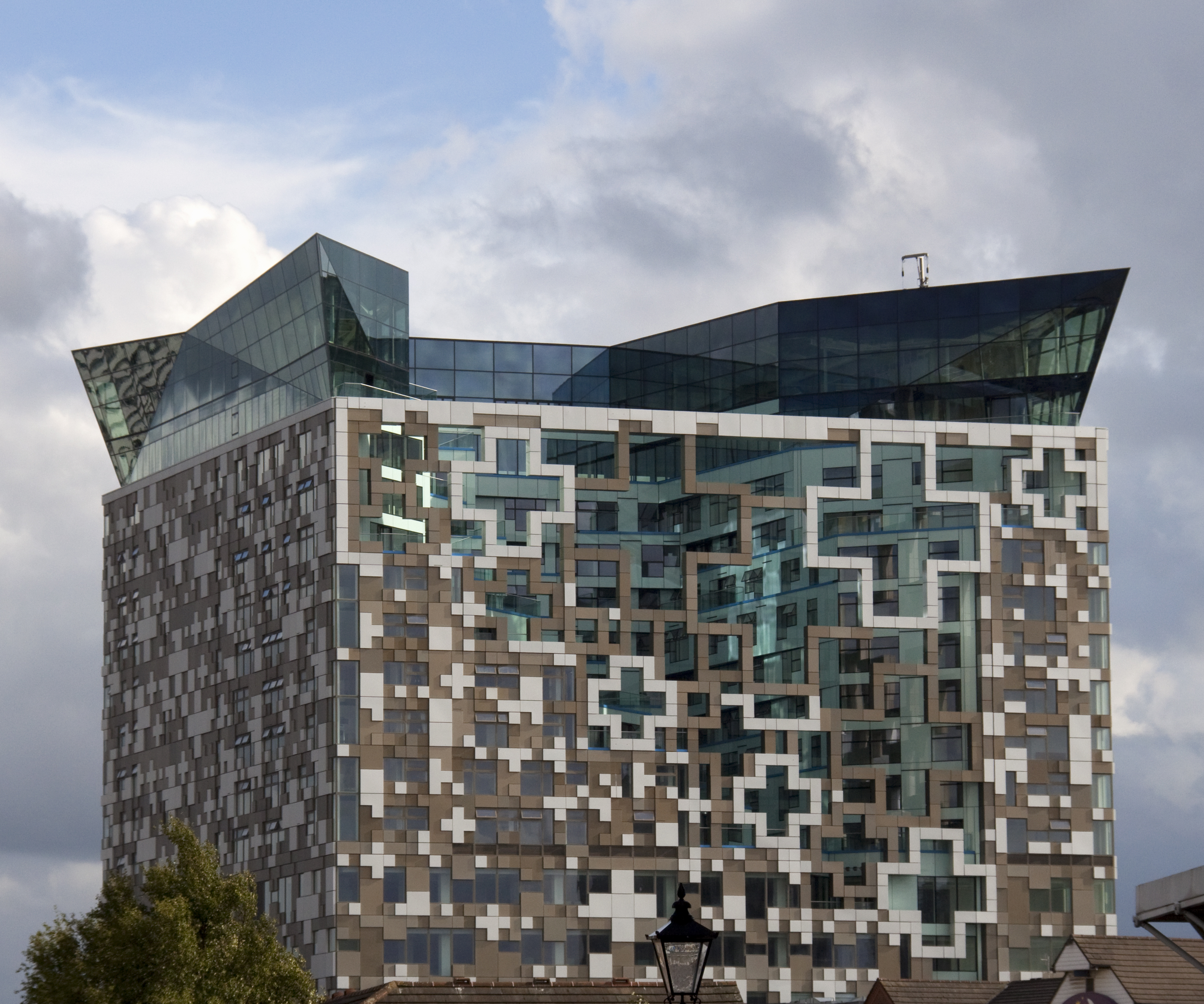
The Cube is the last phase of development at the Mailbox.

The Royal Mail sorting office was recognised by Alan Chatham in 1997. Chatham had been an important figure in the regeneration of Birmingham, working with Argent Group to develop Brindleyplace. He found out that the sorting office was to be sold and tried to convince Argent about the potential the building offered if it were to be converted into a mixed-use building. Argent was unconvinced and so Chatham decided to establish his own development company, Birmingham Development Company, and purchased the building in 1998 for £3 million. He also paid a further £1 million for the surrounding waterfront buildings. Soon after purchasing the building, he sold the air-rights to Crosby Homes, providing him with further money for redeveloping the building.

The building was converted by the Birmingham Development Company and designed by the RIBA award winning, Birmingham practice, Associated Architects. It was to include two hotels with a total of 300 rooms, 15,850 sq. m (170,000 sg. ft.) of office space, 9,290 sq. m (100,000 sq ft.) of retail space and a similar area for restaurants and a health club. Crosby Homes constructed apartments above the space. The redevelopment of the sorting office involved demolition of all but the steel sub-structure. It cost £150 million overall and opened in December 2000. Following the purchase of two retail units by Harvey Nichols, the development was valued at over £125 million.

A public square the size of Chamberlain Square was created to the front of the Mailbox beneath Suffolk Street Queensway. It was paved with natural stone and as well as being a social area, it was also designed to allow the easy movement of visitors to, from and around the building. The area to the rear of the building is used frequently by the public. At the back of the Mailbox a walkway leads over a bridge and to the canal towpaths near Gas Street Basin. A mixed-use building called the Cube, designed by Birmingham born architect Ken Shuttleworth's practice Make Architects with Buro Happold engineers forms the final phase of the Mailbox development and houses a rooftop restaurant, boutique hotel and residential flats.

=== Developments since ===
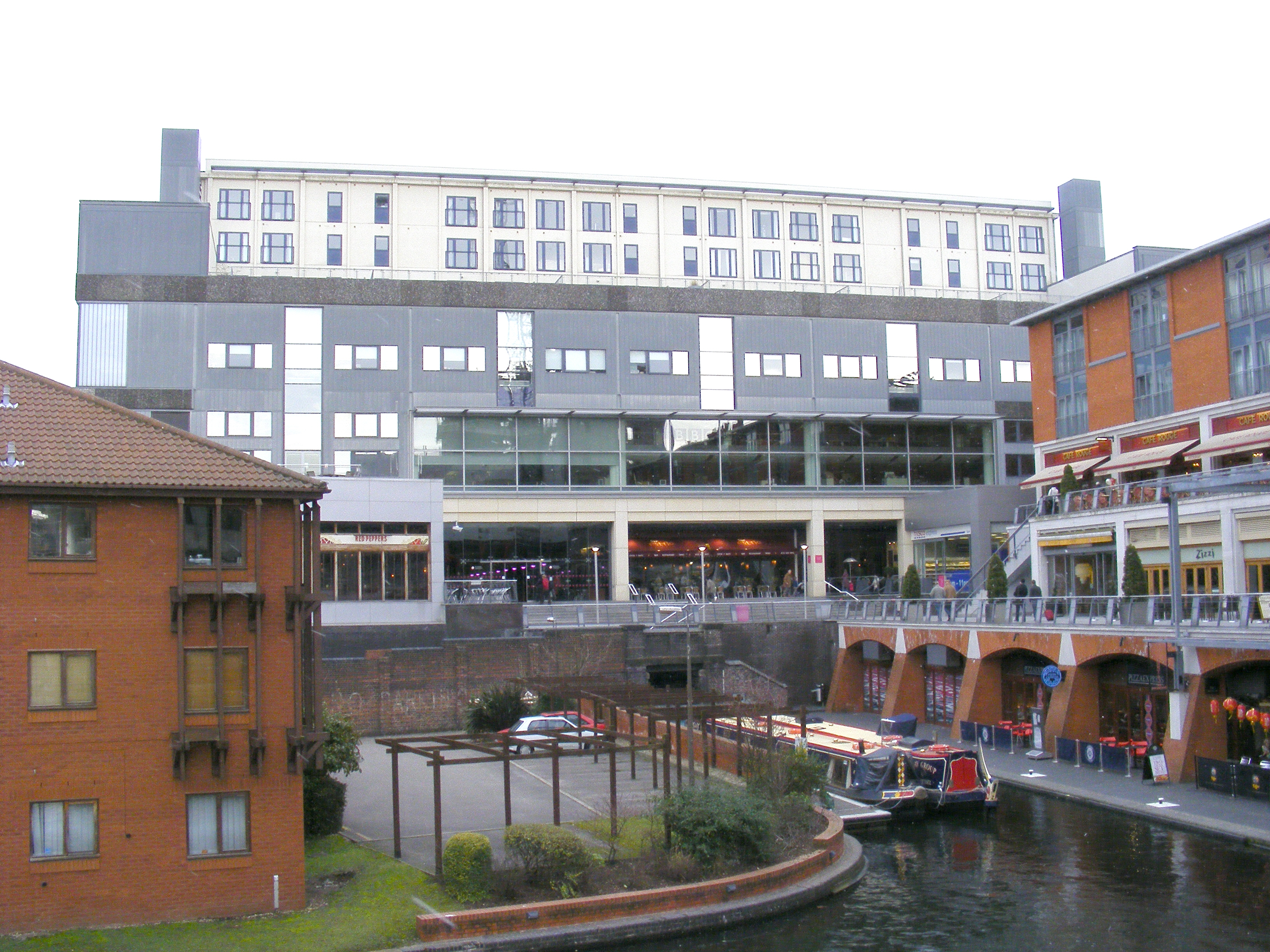
A view of the BBC Birmingham Offices from outside the Mailbox

In 2004, BBC Birmingham moved into a new complex of studios at the Mailbox that replaced the previous Pebble Mill site in Edgbaston. The general public is able to watch radio and television broadcasts being made at an all-access public foyer, as well as surf the BBC website and purchase BBC merchandise. On 31 October 2005, 81-year-old actress Mary Wimbush died at the Mailbox studios shortly after a recording session for The Archers. On 16 February 2008, a shooting incident took place at Cafe Lazeez at the Mailbox.

In April 2011 the Mailbox was sold for £127.1 million to a joint venture between Brockton Capital and Milligan.

On 30 May 2013, Milligan Retail announced that the Mailbox would undergo a major renovation, designed by Stirling Prize winners Stanton Williams, which would see a roof installed over the shopping complex's atrium. The anchor store, Harvey Nichols, would double in size to over 45,000 sq. ft. It was also announced that Brockton Capital and Milligan would work in co-ordination with Birmingham City Council to improve the public area reaching from the underpass beneath Suffolk Street Queensway to the front of Mailbox. These changes would be implemented to complement the redevelopment of New Street station which will house a full-line John Lewis department store.

On 29 November 2013, it was announced that Everyman Cinemas would take space at the Mailbox, opening a 12,000 sq. ft 3-screen cinema in the latter part of 2014, ahead of the completion of the whole scheme in 2015. L.K.Bennett, Jaeger and Gieves and Hawkes will also open in the redeveloped centre in 2015 whilst an improved way-finding system will be introduced to improve shoppers' experience.

In August 2022, it was announced that the BBC intends to leave The Mailbox when its current lease comes to an end in 2026.

== IPSX listing ==
In December 2019, Brockton Capital and Milligan sold the Mailbox to M7 Real Estate ("M7").

In October 2020, M7 announced its intention to float the Mailbox on the International Property Securities Exchange ("IPSX"), making it the first single property REIT to be listed on a dedicated property stock exchange. Shares in Mailbox REIT commenced trading on 14 May 2021.

In April 2022, M7 completed the conversion of level one of the Mailbox from retail into 50,000 sq. ft. of flexible office space, which is now operated by IWG plc under its Spaces co-working brand under a new 10 year management agreement. The accommodation has been well received with occupancy in excess of 60% by October 2022.

== List of occupiers ==
Fashion	Lifestyle	Food & drink	Film	Beauty	Offices	Hotels
Harvey Nichols	BBC Birmingham	Miller & Carter	Everyman Cinema		WSP UK Ltd	Malmaison
Castle Fine Art	Aluna		Nicky Clarke	Associated Architects	AC Hotel	
		Gas Street Social			Spaces	
	Bar Estilo		Malmaison Spa	Washington Green		
Gieves & Hawkes	Ribble Cycles	Chez Mal		Smile 2 Impress	Advanced	
James Lakeland	Intercar Cleaning (ICC)	Lucarelli		Dermoperfection		
Edit Suits	Siematic Kitchen Gallery	Côte Brasserie				
Ribble Cycles	Harvey Jones Kitchens	Indico Street Kitchen				
		Nando's				
		Zizzi				
		Medicine Bakery; Tesco Express; Elio Café; Penny Blacks; The Mayan; Sixes Cricket Club				
