= Mohammad Al Gaz =

Emirati financier and developer

Mohammad AlGaz
- محمد عبدالله القاز
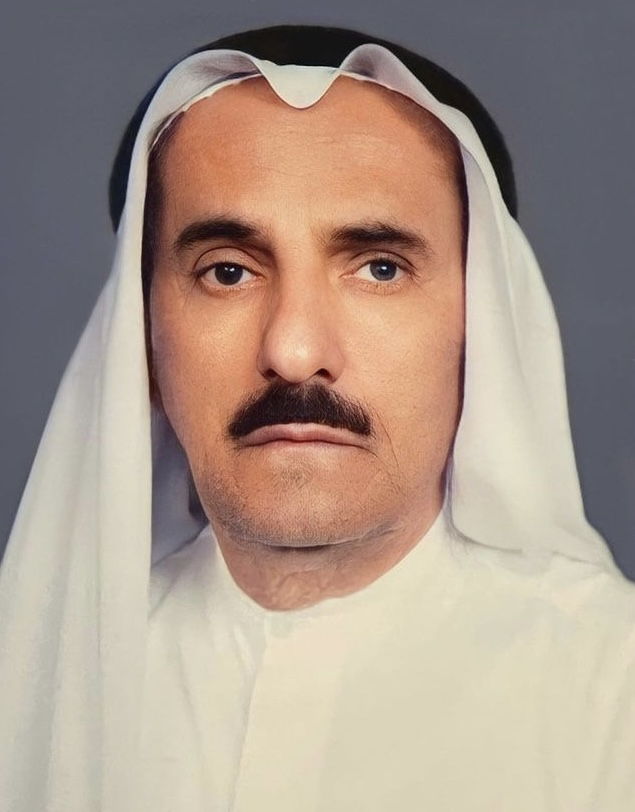
- AlGaz in 1980

Deputy Chairman of the Central Bank
- In office January 1, 1980 – January 1, 1993
- President: Sheikh Zayed bin Sultan Al Nahyan
- Preceded by: Position Established
- Succeeded by: Juma al Majid

Member of the Dubai Municipal Council
- In office July 7, 1958 – January 1, 1965
- President: Sheikh Rashid bin Saeed Al Maktoum

Secretary General of the Dubai Chamber of Commerce
- In office July 1st, 1965 – January 1, 1970
- President: Sheikh Rashid bin Saeed Al Maktoum
- Chancellor: Mohammed Saeed Al Mulla
- Deputy: Saif Ahmad Al Ghurair
- Preceded by: Office Established

Personal details
- Born: 1920 Al Dhagaya, Deira, Dubai
- Died: April 12, 2016 (aged 96) Cleveland Clinic Abu Dhabi
- Education: Al Ahmadiya School
- Occupation: Politician, financier, industrialist, philanthropist

Mohamed Abdallah AlGaz (c. 1920 – April 12, 2016) (Arabic: محمد عبدالله القاز الفلاسي), was a financier, developer, diplomat, central banker and philanthropist in the early years of the United Arab Emirates. AlGaz became a member of Dubai’s first generation of market-making investors and developers in the 1950s through his famous partnership with Juma al Majid.

While a notable statesman and business magnate, AlGaz is widely regarded as a pioneering figure in the history of philanthropy in the United Arab Emirates, with most of his lifetime achievements stemming from generous contributions made to establish various charitable endowments, including some funds that would go on to establish the Beit AlKheir charity, which was the first formalized charitable institution in Dubai.

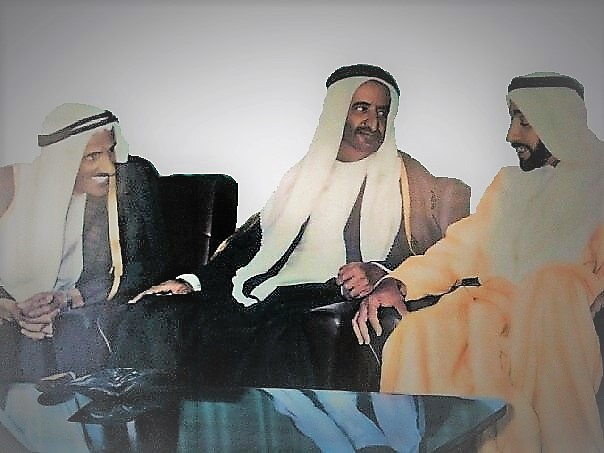
Sheikh Zayed of Abu Dhabi, Sheikh Rashid of Dubai, and Mohammad Al Gaz shortly after Unification.

== Early life ==
AlGaz was born in Al Dhagaya, Deira in 1920 to a modest family. His father, Abdulla Mohamed AlFalasi, died unexpectedly when AlGaz had barely reached adolescence. Despite this, his mother enrolled him in the illustrious Al Ahmadiya School to study under notable theologians such as Sheikh Mohamed Nour AlMuhairi.

During World War II, Dubai was struck with a famine that caused many families to seek refuge in neighboring areas. Escaping this, AlGaz settled temporarily in Bahrain with his family while finding employment in Dammam as a carpenter. AlGaz used his earnings as a carpenter to start a commodity trading operation as the war neared an end. Specifically, he would export various goods such as dried lemons, textiles, and other general goods, from Bahrain and Kuwait to Dubai.

Emerging as a trader in textiles and commodities between markets in the Middle East, AlGaz entered the Switzerland-Dubai-India gold trade in the 1950s after recruiting and partnering with his then-grocer and friend, Juma Al Majid. This partnership would establish the Mohamed & Juma Al Majid company, which owned exclusive distributor rights over consumer appliances and electronics and automobiles.

== Career ==
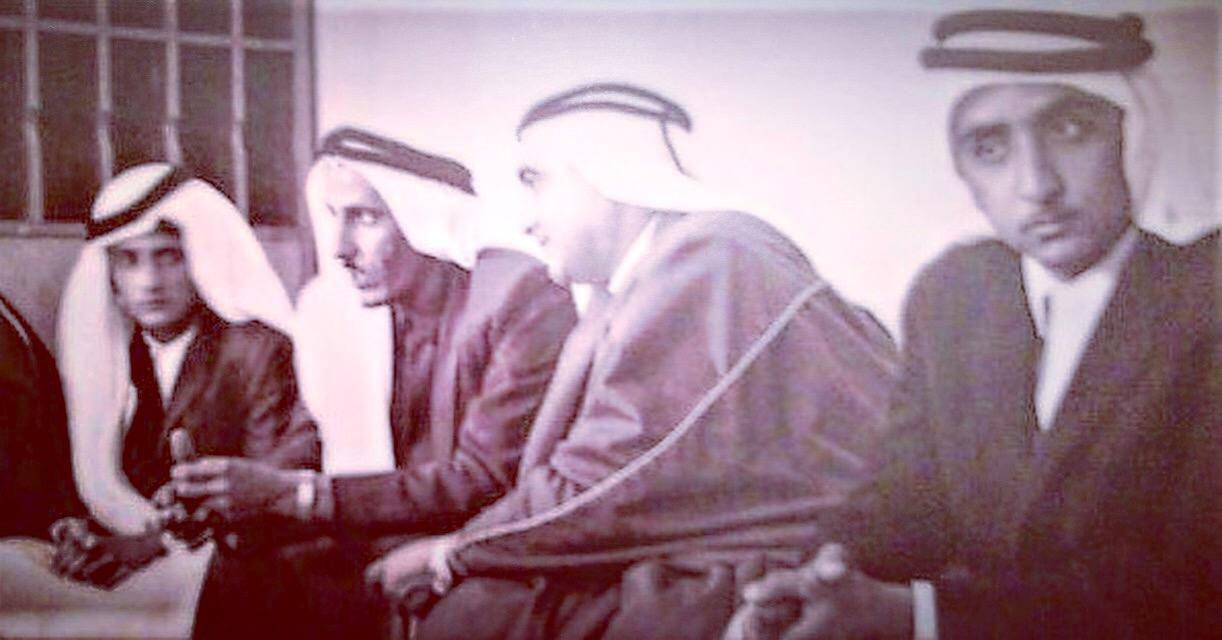
Mohammad AlGaz, with the young Sheikh Mohammad bin Rashid on his right and Mahdi Al Tajir followed by Sheikh Maktoum bin Rashid on his left.

=== Political career ===
AlGaz rose to political power as a trusted advisor of Sheikh Rashid bin Saeed al Maktoum, who himself acceded the throne of Dubai in 1958. During this time, the Dubai Municipal Council (now Dubai Municipality) became the primary political vehicle in command of Dubai's institutional reforms. Al Gaz himself was nominated into the Dubai municipal council on July 7, 1958, alongside other Dubai notables at the time including: Omar bin Haider, Ahmed AlShaibana, and Majid AlFuttaim. During his term as member of the council, Al Gaz was elected to the budget and treasury committee tasked with producing the annual budget for the Dubai government, as well as reviewing the balance sheets of all government related entities.

Mohamed AlGaz became a diplomatic adviser to Sheikh Rashid. He was used as an initial diplomatic channel between Dubai and Abu Dhabi during a time when protracted zero-sum land negotiations were at the centre of the diplomatic relationship; AlGaz helped to reconcile the two sides.

=== Business ===
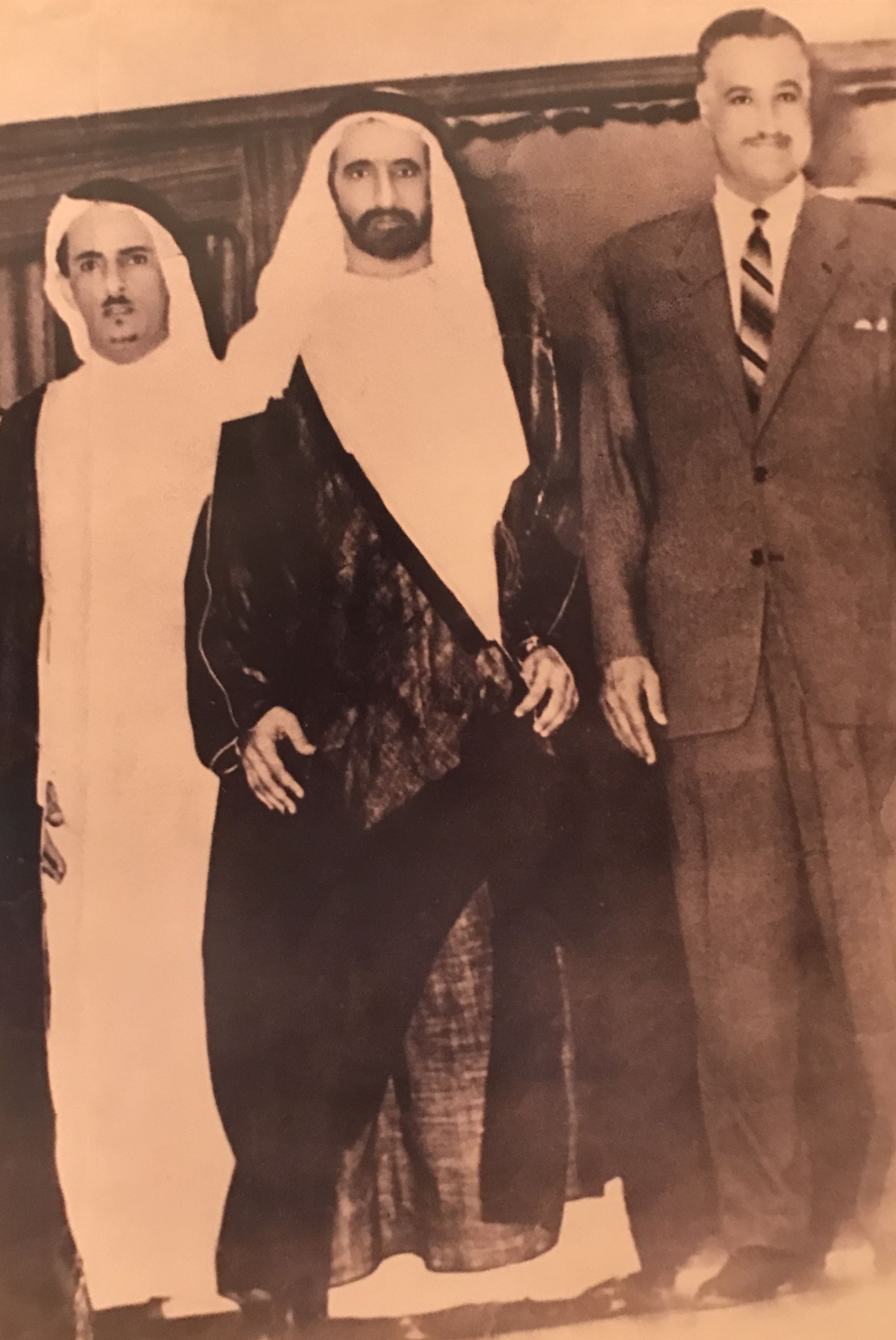
Mohammed Al Gaz (left), and Rashid bin Saeed Al Maktoum (middle) visiting Gamal Abdel Nasser in 1959.

The Indian gold trade fell out of vogue with the partnerships in the early 1970s. AlGaz and his partner Al Majid started to direct their investments into projects that brought know-how or infrastructure to Dubai, which was behind its far more developed rivals in Kuwait and Bahrain. AlGaz and Al Majid invested heavily in securing franchise rights and developing real estate projects; they secured distribution or exclusive franchise rights to international brands in Dubai, including General Electric, Samsung, Phillips, Opel, Pepsi, Nissan, Hyundai, and Kia.

After 11 years of partnership, they split their assets on a mutually agreed basis; reflecting in later years, Al Majid was noted theirs was the only Dubai trading empire of the age to split amicably, with the Al Futtaim partnership, for example, sustaining bitter empire battles on the ending of a major partnerships.

Unlike Al Majid, AlGaz divested from the majority of his franchise holdings (e.g. selling franchise rights to Nissan in the 1980s) to concentrate on real estate development. Having built the first three-story building in Dubai's history, AlGaz then developed much of the properly around Port Said: the clock-tower plaza, and Hamriya in Bur Deira, in what became the Deira market place.

== Later years and philanthropy ==
Post-federation, AlGaz helped found the National Council and served as the first Deputy Chairman of the Central Bank of the UAE, from the Bank's founding in 1980 into the mid-1990s. Serving under the Chairman Sheikh Suroor bin Mohammad Al Nahyan, AlGaz was an important figure in the first two decades of the UAE's economic development.

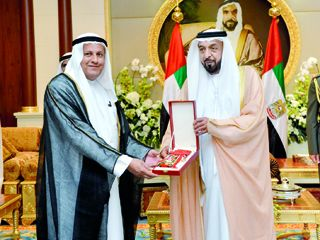
UAE President Sheikh Khalifa presenting Abdallah Mohammad Al Gaz with the President's Merit Award on the behalf of his father, 2012.

Being among the first generation of Dubai business people formed after the crises of the 1930s, AlGaz tried to move away from the pearl business. He encouraged private investment in public education by building schools, including the Amna bint Wahb Girls School, the Gamal Abdulnasser Boys School, and the Community Schools. He endowed public and private institutions anonymously, and in 1989 developed with Juma Al Majid the United Arab Emirates' first charitable society, Beit Al Khair.

== Personal life ==
AlGaz died at the age of 96 from natural causes on April 12, 2016 after a week-long stay in Cleveland Clinic Abu Dhabi. News of his passing quickly spread throughout the country, with hundreds making their appearance to the burial site in Al Qusais Cemetery. His funeral over the next three days was visited by a number of officials, including senior government leaders, ministers, and businessmen as well as including United Arab Emirates President Sheikh Mohammed bin Zayed Al Nahyan, and Prime Minister Sheikh Mohammed bin Rashid Al Maktoum.

== Awards and honors ==
- UAE Pioneers Award, 2018 - Awarded posthumously for significant contributions to the development of the humanitarian sector in the United Arab Emirates
- President's Merit Award, 2012 - For his support of the spirit of the union of the United Arab Emirates
- Dubai Appreciation Award for Community Service, 2022 - Awarded posthumously for his inspiring role to the Dubai community.
