= Al Ahmadiya School =

Coordinates: 25°16′N 55°18′E

- مدرسة الاحمدية
- AlRas, Deira, Dubai; United Arab Emirates

Information
- School type: Private School
- Religious affiliation: Maliki Islam
- Established: c. 1912
- Founder: Ahmed Bin Dalmook

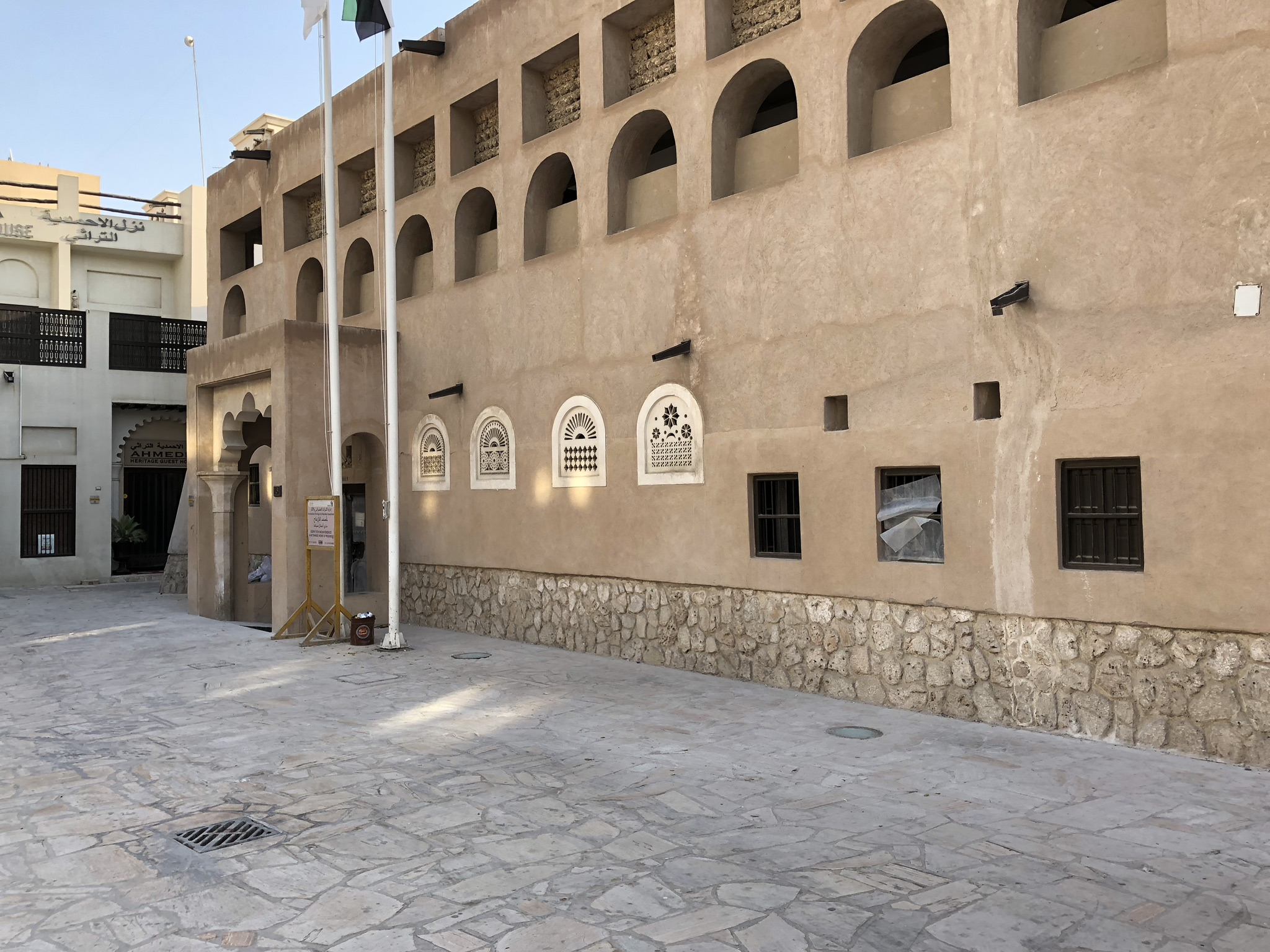
Al Ahmadiya School main entrance

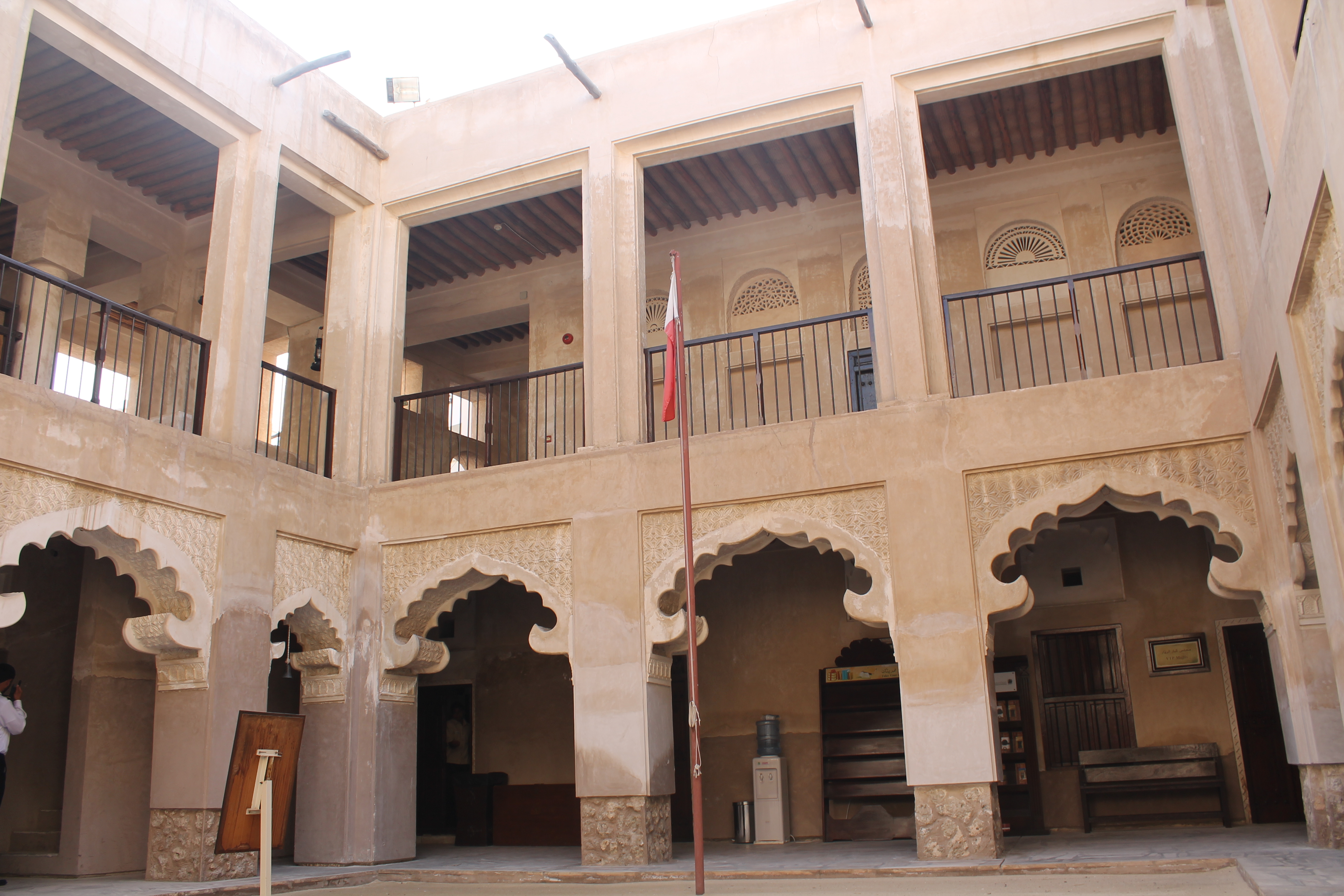
Outdoor courtyard where students used to gather in lines in the morning

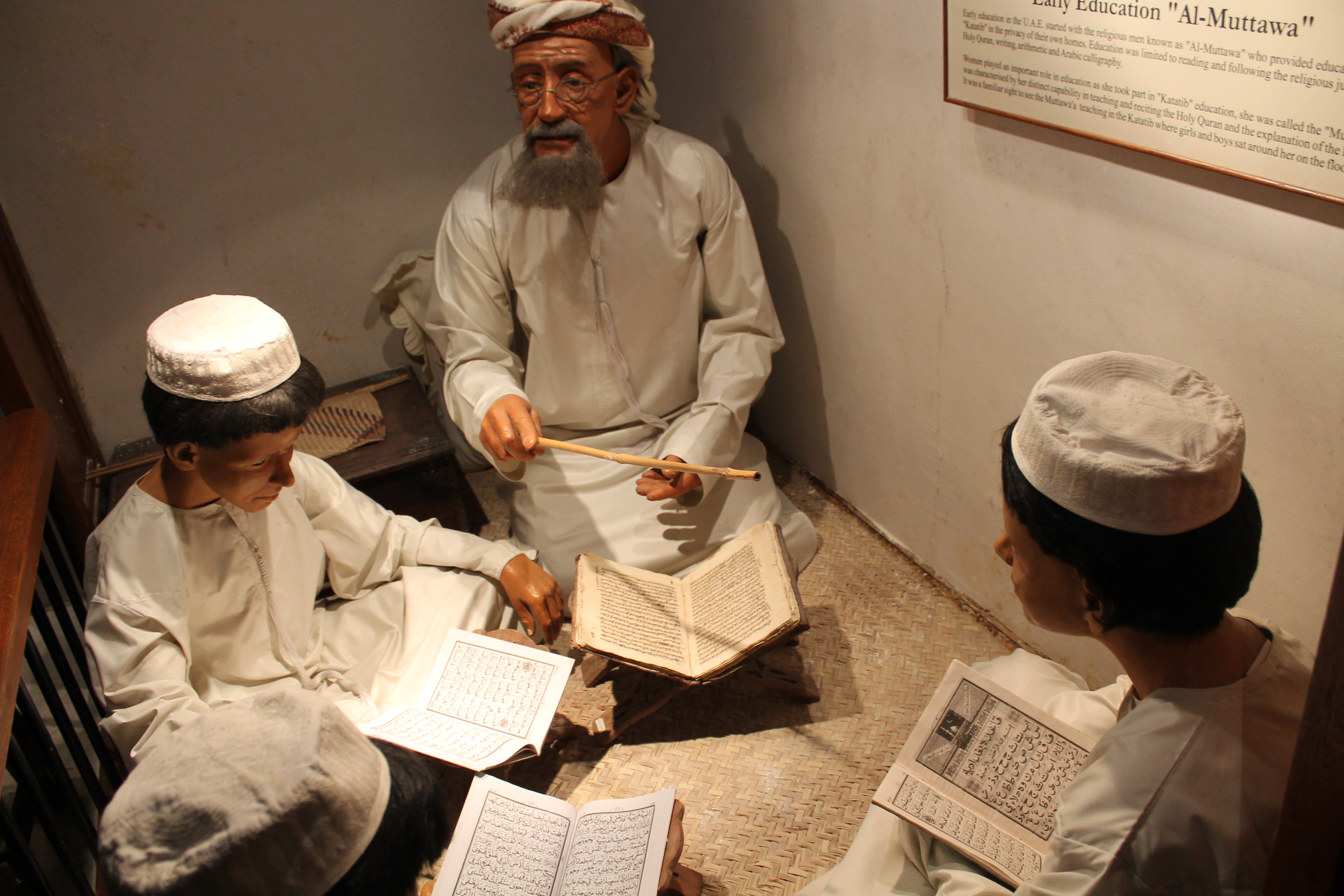
A corner of the Al Ahmadiya School museum showing a scene of traditional education

Al Ahmadiya School (Arabic: مدرسة الأحمدية) was a private school in Al Ras, Dubai, United Arab Emirates. The school was established in 1912 by Sheikh Ahmed Bin Dalmouk, making it Dubai's oldest known formal educational institution. The school has housed an illustrious faculty collection, including some of Dubai's most famous jurists and Islamic scholars at the time. It has also graduated cohorts of notable alumni that would go on to lead Dubai's modernization in the 20th century.

== History ==
The school was founded in the year 1912 by Sheikh Ahmed Bin Dalmouk, of the pearl trade in the Persian Gulf. Following his demise, his son Sheikh Mohammed Bin Ahmed Bin Dalmouk completed the construction of the school and named it Al Ahmadiya School in honor of his father. The Dubai government worked on the restoration of Al Ahmadiya School in mid-1994 and converted it into a museum that was inaugurated by His Highness Sheikh Hamdan Bin Rashid Al Maktoum on March 20, 2000, representing the genesis of semi-formal education in Dubai.

== Notable alumni ==
Over the decades the school remained in operation, it graduated many notable figures that would go on to contribute to Dubai's development in the 20th century. These alumni include:

- Easa Al-Gurg
- Abdulla Al Futtaim
- Majid Al Futtaim
- Mohammad Al Gaz
- Abdulla Al Ghurair
- Saif Ahmad Al Ghurair
