= Mick DeGiulio =

American designer, author and product designer

Mick De Giulio (born 1953) is an American designer, author, and product designer known for his impact on kitchen interiors. He is the co-author of two books on kitchen design, KitchenCentric and KITCHEN.

== Interiors ==
De Giulio founded de Giulio Kitchen Design in 1984. The company is based in Wilmette, Illinois, and has completed commissions across the United States and abroad. His work has appeared in publications such as Architectural Digest, House Beautiful, Interior Design, Forbes, Robb Report, Traditional Home, Germany's Architektur & Wohnen, France's Maison Francaise, and Italy's Ottagano.

Notable projects include residential kitchens for the Ritz-Carlton Residences, Chicago (2012), training and demonstration kitchens for Sub-Zero/Wolf/Cove, concept spaces for Kohler Co. headquarters, and an 11,000 square foot retail showroom for Abt Electronics. Well-known media commissions include research and demonstration kitchens for the Chicago Tribune (1995), Better Homes and Gardens/Meredith Corporation (2005) and the House Beautiful Kitchen of the Year (2012) installed for public viewing at Rockefeller Center in New York.

== Product design ==
De Giulio has designed several kitchen product lines distributed internationally. His cabinetry for SieMatic Corporation, based in Löhne, Germany, was selected for the kitchen at Washington D.C.'s Blair House, the U.S. presidential guest residence, in 2002. In 2011, Kallista, a Kohler Company, introduced the Mick De Giulio Kitchen Sink Collection. His Multiere sink was voted Best of Year by Interior Design magazine. A mixed-metals faucet with new water spray technology for Kallista followed in 2020 and was also voted Best of Year by Interior Design magazine.
