= Associated Architects =

British architectural firm

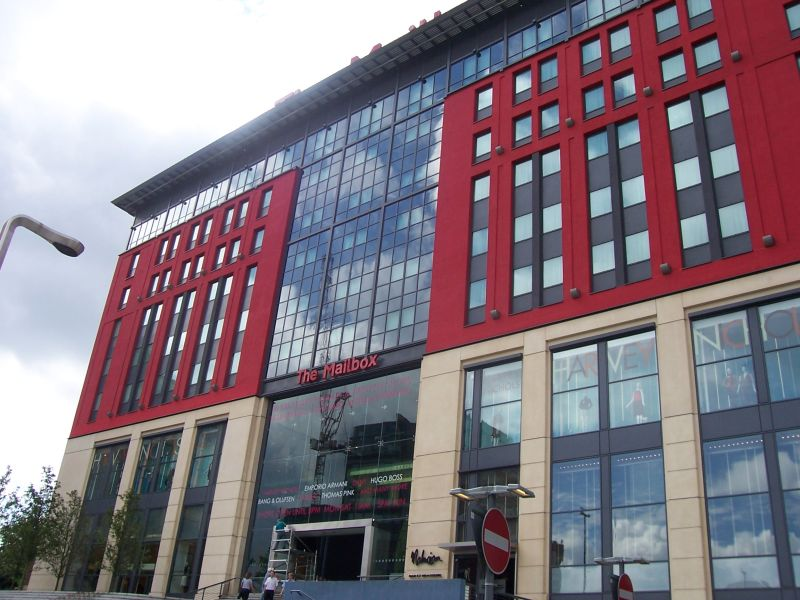
Associated Architects' Birmingham Offices are located in The Mailbox, which was designed by the practice

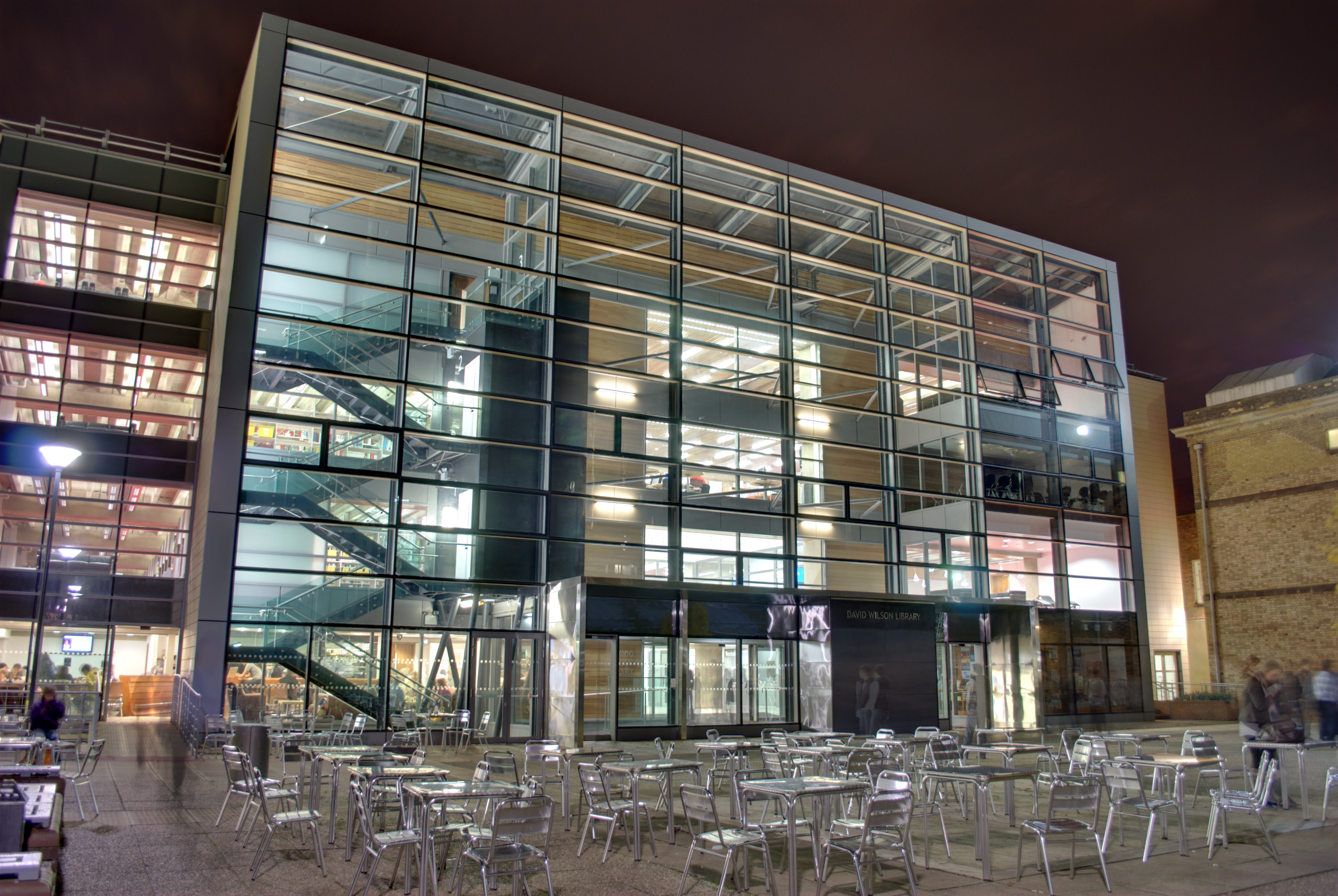
RIBA Award Winner 2009, David Wilson Library

Associated Architects is a leading AJ100 architectural firm with offices in Birmingham, Oxford and Leeds, England. Founded in 1968, the practice has a broad portfolio of work including arts, commercial offices, residential, masterplanning and leisure and is particularly known for its work in education. It has received many national awards including over 30 RIBA Awards, together with the RIBA Sustainability Award. For its commercial work it has been awarded nine BCO Awards (British Council for Offices). The practice designed the George Davies Centre, at the University of Leicester, currently the largest (non-domestic) building in the UK to be Passivhaus accredited. It is also responsible for the design and delivery of Bartholomew Barn, the UK's first "multi-comfort" building, a benchmark pioneered by Saint Gobain. The building has set a new bar for sustainable architecture.

== History ==
The practice was formed by Malcolm Booth, Richard Slawson and Walter Thomson, who met as teachers at the Birmingham School of Architecture in the 1960s. At that time the School undertook live projects and the founders were encouraged to set up a part-time practice, employing students to undertake the work with appropriate management. The work was soon supplemented with private commissions and the move of the School from Aston University prompted the partners to commit to full-time practice in 1973.

The practice name was conceived as having a life beyond the founders, its name Associated Architects chosen deliberately not to include their surnames. The early workload of housing, industrial buildings and offices expanded and the practice relocated in 1976 to St. Paul's Square, which it used as a base for the regeneration of the Jewellery Quarter. It developed skills in urban regeneration, with listed buildings and in urban housing, anticipating the city living movement by a decade.

Paul Lister joined the practice in 1976, becoming a partner in 1984: Ian Standing joined in 1985 and became a partner in 1989. At this time the practice undertook its first projects with independent schools, developing this into a broad education workload. It won its first RIBA Awards and with the Property Services Agency undertook commissions for Law Courts at Stafford and Worcester, opening a Cyprus office to deliver projects for the Ministry of Defence. University work developed at this time with projects including the Birmingham School of Jewellery and the restoration of the Grade I listed Birmingham School of Art.

As the National Lottery made funds available for Arts projects in the 1990s, the practice won national competitions for projects including the City of Birmingham Symphony Orchestra Centre (with Sir Simon Rattle), the Water Hall Gallery and the rebuilding of the Birmingham Hippodrome. Following its work on the first mixed use building at 9 Brindleyplace it built numerous offices and subsequently delivered the largest mixed use building in the UK: the Mailbox.

Matthew Goer joined in 1990 and became a partner in 2001. The founders retired between 1996 and 2002 and Paul Lister retired in 2006. Warren Jukes and Adam Wardle joined in 1996 and with Matthew Goer and Ian Standing became directors of the Limited Liability Partnership in 2003. During 2012 James Hall was promoted to Director and Richard Perry to Director in 2014. Ian Standing retired 2016 having served over 30 years. Adam Wardle died unexpectedly in June 2013, at the age of 42. His obituary appeared in the RIBA Journal.

Associated Architects retains its close relationship with the School of Architecture and has strong links with the cultural and business communities in the city. Although based in Birmingham and deriving much of its work from the region, it also works nationally and internationally.

== Architectural work ==
=== Education ===
Universities

- School of Architecture and the Built Environment, University of Wolverhampton, 2020
- Edward Boyle Library, University of Leeds 2017.
- New Library, University of Birmingham, 2016.
- Centre for Medicine, University of Leicester, 2016.
- The Curzon Building, Birmingham City University, 2015.
- Birmingham Institute of Art & Design, Birmingham City University, 2013 (RIBA Award 2014)
- David Wilson Library, University of Leicester, 2008. (RIBA Award 2009)
- Health, Design & Technology Centre, Coventry University, 2009
- Birmingham School of Art, Birmingham City University, 1995. (RIBA Award 1996)
- School of Jewellery, Birmingham City University, 1994. (RIBA Award 1995)

Independent schools

- Bartholomew Barn, Kings Hawford Junior School, Worcester, 2016
- Yarm School, Stockton-on-Tees, 2012 (RIBA Award 2013)
- The Michael Baker Boathouse, The King's School, Worcester, 2012 (RIBA Award 2013)
- King's School Art School, The King's School, Worcester, 2007
- King's School Library, The King's School, Worcester, 2006. (RIBA Award 2008)
- The British School, Abu Dhabi, UAE, 2005
- Mary Windsor Boarding House, Bromsgrove School, 2002
- Theatre and Hall, Queen Margaret's School, York, 2002. (RIBA White Rose Award for Design Excellence 2004)
- Theatre, Dean Close School, Cheltenham, 1992

Schools

- Starbank School All-Through School, 2016
- The University of Birmingham School, University of Birmingham, 2015
- St Peter's Academy, Stoke BSF, 2013
- Birmingham BSF (Building Schools for the Future), 2012
- Old Swinford Hospital School, Stourbridge, 2010
- St. Olave's, St. Peter's School, York, 2009
- Charter Primary School & Surestart Centre, Coventry, 2005
- Hagley Primary School, Hagley, 2004

Colleges

- West Midlands Construction UTC, University of Wolverhampton, CITB, 2016
- Health Futures UTC (University Technical College), West Midlands Ambulance Service & NHS Foundation, 2015
- Campus Redevelopment, University College Birmingham, 2013
- Blossomfield Campus, Solihull College, Birmingham, 2010
- Progress Centre, Cannock Chase Technology College, Cannock, 2004
- Worcester VI Form College, Worcester, 2002

=== Offices ===
- Platform 21, Birmingham, completion expected 2021
- 6 East Parade, Leeds, 2017
- West Bromwich Building Society Headquarters Offices, West Bromwich, 2016
- 10 Woodcock Street, Birmingham City Council, 2012 (National BCO Award 2013)
- Operations Centre, Severn Trent Water, Coventry, 2010
- One Severn Street Place, Associated Architects, Birmingham, 2009
- Project Sunrise, Punch Taverns, Burton, 2009
- 134 Edmund Street, Birmingham, 2004
- Interchange Place, Birmingham, 2003

=== Mixed-use ===
- 10 Brindleyplace, Birmingham, completion expected 2022
- Post & Mail, Birmingham
- The Mailbox, Birmingham, 2000
- 9 Brindleyplace, Birmingham, 1999

=== Culture ===
- Lapworth Museum of Geology, University of Birmingham, 2015
- Birmingham Town Hall, 2007
- Birmingham Hippodrome, 2001 (in conjunction with Law Dunbar Nasmith). (RIBA Award 2002)
- The Water Hall, Birmingham, 2001
- The CBSO Centre, 1998 and refurbished by Associated Architects in 2014

=== Residential ===
- Tyndal Street, Cardiff, Completion expected 2022
- Newhall Square (PRS Development), Spitfire Homes, 2020
- Old Union Mill, Birmingham
- 1 Swallow Street, Birmingham, 2016
- Eco Vicarages, Diocese of Worcester, 2012
- Cobtun House, Worcester, 2003. (RIBA Award 2005, RIBA Sustainability Award 2005)
- St Crispin's Manor, Northampton, 2008
- Crown Lofts, Walsall, 2003
- Washington Wharf, Birmingham, 2001

=== Other ===
- University railway station 2024
- Jaguar Land Rover Manufacturing Building, i54 Business Park, 2017
- Southwater One, Telford, 2014 (Triple RIBA Award Winner 2014)
- Birmingham Dogs' Home Rescue and Welfare Centre, 2015
- Bristol Civil Justice Centre, Bristol, 2010
- Acorn's Children's Hospice, Worcester, 2005
- Wapping Wharf Masterplan, Bristol
- Stafford Combined Court, Stafford, 1991
- Lee Bank Health Centre, Birmingham, 1990. (RIBA Award 1990)

== Awards ==
- 2016 RIBA West Midlands Award, McIntyre House, University College Birmingham
- 2015 RIBA West Midlands Award, Southwater One, Telford & Wrekin Council
- 2014 RIBA East Midlands Building of the Year Award, College Court, University of Leicester
- 2014 RIBA East Midlands Award, College Court, University of Leicester
- 2014 RIBA East Midlands Conservation Award, College Court, University of Leicester
- 2014 RIBA West Midlands Award, The Parkside Building, Birmingham City University
- 2014 RIBA West Midlands Award, The Lighthouse, Birmingham Youth Services
- 2013 RIBA North East Award: Princess Alexandra Auditorium, Yarm independent school
- 2013 RIBA West Midlands Award: The Michael Baker Boathouse, The King's School Worcester
- 2009 RIBA Award: David Wilson Library, University of Leicester
- 2008 RIBA East Midlands Award: David Wilson Library, University of Leicester
- 2008 RIBA Award: The King's School Library, Worcester
- 2005 RIBA Sustainability Award: Cobtun House, Worcester
- 2005 RIBA Award: Cobtun House, Worcester
- 2004 RIBA White Rose Award for Design Excellence: Queen Margaret's School, York
- 2002 RIBA Award: Hippodrome Theatre, Birmingham
- 1998 RIBA Housing Design Award: City Heights, Birmingham
- 1997 RIBA Housing Design Award: Berkley Court, Birmingham
- 1996 RIBA Award: College of Art, Birmingham
- 1995 RIBA Award: School of Jewellery, Birmingham
- 1993 RIBA Award: 30 St. Paul's Square, Birmingham
- 1993 RIBA Housing Design Award: Malt Mill Lane, Alcester
- 1992 RIBA Award: Clayton Hall, Lilleshall NSC
- 1990 RIBA Award: The Walled Garden, Brockhampton
- 1989 RIBA Award: Lee Bank Health Centre, Birmingham
- 1986 RIBA Award: Malt Mill Lane, Alcester
- 1983 RIBA Housing Design Award: Steven's Terrace, Birmingham
- 1983 RIBA Award: Brown's Restaurant, Worcester
- 1982 RIBA Award: Pleck Orchard, Hartlebury
- 1979 RIBA Housing Design Award: Bishop's Court, Northfield, Birmingham

== Publications ==
- XL, Associated Architects Publishing, 2008
- Buildings that Feel Good, Ziona Strelitz, RIBA Publishing, 2008
- Birmingham: Shaping the City, Ben Flatman, RIBA Publishing, 2008
- Birmingham (Pevsner Architectural Guide), Andy Foster, Yale University Press, 2005
