= Advanced Computer Software =

British private company

OneAdvanced Group Limited
- Type: Private
- Industry: Enterprise software; Cloud computing; Computer software
- Founded: 2008; 18 years ago Slough, Berkshire
- Founders: Vin Murria
- Headquarters: Birmingham, United Kingdom
- Area served: United Kingdom, Republic of Ireland, India, Australia, Canada and United States
- Key people: Simon Walsh (CEO)
- Revenue: ▲£346m (2024); ▲£322m (2023); £317m (2022)
- Net income: ▲ -£42.4m (2024); -£50.5m (2023)
- Owner: Vista Equity Partners (50%); BC Partners (50%)
- Number of employees: ▼2,864 (2024)▲2,960 (2023); 2,676 (2022)
- Website: oneadvanced.com

OneAdvanced Group Limited (operating as OneAdvanced) is a British private enterprise software and cloud computing company founded by Vin Murria in 2008. Headquartered in Birmingham in the West Midlands, it supplies business software and outsourced IT services – including hosting and cloud-based systems – to organisations in sectors such as health and social care, education, legal services and the wider public sector in the United Kingdom and overseas. The company has grown through a series of acquisitions and is jointly owned by private equity firms Vista Equity Partners and BC Partners.

Originally listed on the Alternative Investment Market as Advanced Computer Software, the business was taken private by Vista Equity Partners in 2014 and rebranded to OneAdvanced after a strategy refresh in the early 2020s. In 2024 it sold its application modernisation division to IBM for integration into the IBM Consulting portfolio.

OneAdvanced also provides software used in frontline health and care services. In August 2022 a ransomware attack against its health and care systems disrupted NHS 111 and other services and led to the exfiltration of personal data from tens of thousands of people. The incident cost the group tens of millions of pounds in remediation and outage credits and, following an investigation, resulted in a £3.08 million penalty issued by the Information Commissioner's Office in 2025.

== History ==
The company was founded by Vin Murria in 2008. Originally listed on the Alternative Investment Market in 2008 with a cash value of £3 million, it was bought by Vista Equity Partners in 2014 for £765 million. From the 18% stake Murria held in she took £140.2m from the sale making her one of the wealthiest women in the UK. Murria was awarded an OBE for services to the UK digital economy and advancing women in the software sector in the 2018 New Year Honours.

At the time of sale, Vista brought in a new leadership team including Chief Executive Officer Gordon Wilson, and Chief Financial Officer Andrew Hicks.

In August 2019, Vista sold a 50% stake to BC Partners for £2 billion including debt.

In 2023, the company undertook a strategy refresh, alongside changes to the executive management team, appointing Simon Walsh as Chief Executive Officer, Stephen Dews as Chief Financial Officer and Andrew Henderson as Chief Technology Officer. The aim of the strategy refresh was stated to prioritise resources into high growth market sectors and product categories. Part of this refresh, which cost £8.2m, included updating the operating name from "Advanced" to "OneAdvanced".

=== Sale of application modernization business ===
In January 2024, IBM announced that it had signed a definitive agreement to acquire application modernization capabilities from OneAdvanced. This part of OneAdvanced became part of the IBM Consulting division with service offerings aiming to complement the capabilities of IBM Watsonx Code Assistant for Z. OneAdvanced had net proceeds of £112.7 million from the sale of the division.

== Health and Care Cyber Incident ==
On the 4th August 2022, the company experienced a cybersecurity incident that caused disruption to the NHS 111 service. Simon Short, the CEO, was quoted as saying:

"A security issue was identified yesterday, which resulted in loss of service [...] We can confirm that the incident is related to a cyber-attack and as a precaution, we immediately isolated all our health and care environments."

Perpetrators of the attack were able to extract information relating to 16 Staffplan and Caresys customers.

=== Impact ===
The company's Adastra, Caresys, Odyssey, Carenotes, Crosscare, Staffplan and eFinancials products were all affected, with downtime and recovery lasting for several months.

The Chief Executive of the Oxford Health NHS Foundation Trust reported that:

This ongoing cyber incident has placed a huge burden on colleagues across Oxford Health, many of whom have worked considerably in excess of their contracted hours in order to deliver services

82,946 people were affected by the breach which included phone numbers and medical records, as well as details of how to gain entry to the homes of 890 people who were receiving care at home.

The cyber attack including resulting remediation and outage credits cost the group £18.2 million in 2023 and £9.4 million in 2024.

=== Investigation and regulatory action ===
The Information Commissioner's Office announced in August 2024 a provisional decision to impose a fine of £6.09m on the company, following an initial finding that the provider failed to implement measures to protect the personal information. The ICO and OneAdvanced agreed a voluntary settlement in March 2025. OneAdvanced agreed to pay a final penalty of £3,076,320 without appealing. The final investigation found that personal information belonging to 79,404 people was taken, including details of how to gain entry into the homes of 890 people who were receiving care at home.

== Locations ==
OneAdvanced's head office is located in Mailbox, Birmingham with other office locations in Newcastle, Ashford, Belfast, Dublin, York and Willerby.

The US head office is located in Atlanta, Georgia, while the Australian office is located in Melbourne. OneAdvanced also have offices in India; specifically Ahmedabad, Bangalore and Baroda, where the primary development functions are located.

== Acquisitions ==
Acquisition	Date	Price	Notes
Serco Learning	December 2012	£7.25m	A deal for Serco's education unit, bringing software including Facility CMIS Administration with Facility ePortal and Progresso for primary and secondary schools, timetabling software Scheduler, and CMIS and CMIS Go for the higher education sector.
Computer Software Holdings	March 2013	£110m	Paid for partly by the share placing that helped raise £44m for ACS.
Compass	February 2014	£14.5m	OneAdvanced extended its reach in the education software market by purchasing Chester-based CRM specialist Compass Computer Consultants. Compass was later renamed "ProSuite".
ConsultCRM	April 2014		
Hudman	July 2017		A Welsh cloud SaaS solution, Hudman was later renamed "Business Cloud Essentials".
Information Balance	March 2018	£2.5m	
Science Warehouse	March 2018	£17m	A British developer of cloud SaaS procurement solutions for £17 million. Science Warehouse was later renamed "Cloud Marketplace"
Docman	July 2018	£90m	OneAdvanced acquired PCTI Solutions. Their product, Docman, maintains one billion records and documents for more than 40,000,000 patients in the UK, including the whole of Scotland. A problem with version 7 of the Docman platform in September 2018 meant letters received through NHSmail, automatically scanned to be added to patient records, were not uploaded. About 6,000 GP practices using the electronic document transfer function were affected.
Oyez	March 2019	£23.2m	
Kirona	April 2019	£55.1m	Acquired from Livingbridge and Gresham House.
Modern Systems	July 2019	$26m	
Careworks	November 2019	€21.5m	
Tikit	March 2020	£46.8m	Acquired for significantly less than the original £80 million asking price.
Mitrefinch	October 2020	£90.6m	Acquired from LDC who completed a management buyout in 2016 for £20 million.
Clear Review	October 2020	£26m	Acquired from Stuart Hearn (entrepreneur and former Sony Music HR Director) and Mercia Asset Management
Certainty	February 2021	£16.3m	
bksb	May 2021	£19.3m	Acquired from West Nottinghamshire College.
Smart Apprentices	May 2021	£28m	Acquired from entrepreneur Fiona Hudson-Kelly.
Isosec	September 2021	£22.3m	A previous acquisition attempt from rival firm Imprivata was abandoned in May 2021 after a CMA investigation.
cloudtrade	October 2021	£25.8m	
Portt	April 2022	£16.05m	
Decision Time	April 2022	£22m	
Pellcomp	June 2022	£8.1m	
