= Vin Murria =

British businesswoman (born 1962)

Vin Murria OBE
- Born: Vinodka Murria; 1962 (age 63–64); Punjab, India
- Education: University of London
- Occupation: Businesswoman

Vinodka "Vin" Murria OBE (born 1962) is a British businesswoman and founder of Advanced Computer Software where she was CEO until it was acquired in 2015. Prior to that she was founder and CEO of Computer Software Group Plc, acquired by Hellman & Friedman in 2007. She works as an investor/advisor to HgCapital.

In 2018, Murria received an OBE for services to the British digital economy, as well as for advancing women in the software sector.

== Early life ==
Murria was born in Punjab, India, and moved to the United Kingdom at the age of three. She received a first class BSc in computer science and an MBA from the University of London.

== Career ==
Murria began her career at Kewill Systems. When she left the company in 2001, she had risen to the role of group chief operating officer.

Following her time at Kewill, she started her own journey with a shell company, Computer Software Group in 2002. The Group was taken private with HG Capital in April 2007, merged with Iris software and sold to Hellman & Friedman for £500m in July 2007.

Murria has been a partner at Elderstreet Investments since 2002.

In 2008, Murria founded the Advanced Computer Software Group. In 2015 she sold the business for £765 million to Vista Equity Partners and subsequently it was sold again in Sept 2019 for £2Bn with Vista and BC Partners now the owners.

Murria has also been appointed to sit on various boards. She currently sits on the boards of Bunzl Plc (FTSE 100), Softcat Plc (FTSTE 250) and Silicon Valley Bank. Her previous non-executive director roles include Chime Plc, Zoopla Plc, and Sophos Plc.

In September 2018, Murria joined Pythagoras Communications as a major shareholder and chairperson. The business was acquired by Ernst & Young in May 2021.

In May 2020, Murria became the largest shareholder in M&C Saatchi, and subsequently with her vehicle ADVT extended the holding to 22.3% of the enlarged company. In September 2022, it was announced Murria's bid to acquire M&C Saatchi was rejected by shareholders.

== Awards ==
Murria was named Woman of the Year at the 2012 Cisco Everywoman in Technology Awards and Entrepreneur of the Year at the 2012 AIM Awards. She was also named UK Tech Awards 2013 Tech Personality of the Year (shared with David Braben, CEO of Frontier Developments). In 2014, Advanced was named Technology Company of the Year. She was awarded an honorary doctorate by Edinburgh Napier University.

== Philanthropy ==
Murria founded the PS Foundation in 2007 to help educate young women in India and the UK. The foundation is named after her mother.
