= Easa Saleh Al Gurg =

Emirati entrepreneur and diplomat

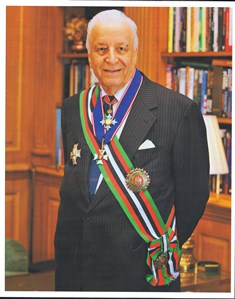
- Born: 1927; United Arab Emirates
- Died: 31 March 2022 (aged 94–95)
- Citizenship: United Arab Emirates
- Known for: First UAE Banker, UAE Ambassador to the UK and Ireland
- Children: Raja Al Gurg, Muna Al Gurg

Easa Saleh Al Gurg was an Emirati entrepreneur, philanthropist, diplomat, and the founder of the Easa Saleh Al Gurg Group (ESAG), a conglomerate headquartered in the United Arab Emirates. He was born in 1927 and died on 31 March 2022.

He served as the UAE's first banker and was the executive director of the Trucial States Development Board in 1971, a role that contributed to the region's economic development. He received the Order of Zayed II in 1997 from Sheikh Zayed Bin Sultan Al Nahyan and the Knight Commander of the Royal Victorian Order (KCVO) from Queen Elizabeth II in 2009 for his work in strengthening UAE-UK relations.

== Early life ==
Easa Saleh Al Gurg was born in the UAE in 1927 into a family with deep roots in pearl trading. As a child, Al Gurg attended Al Falah School in Dubai but left due to dissatisfaction with the curriculum. Despite not completing formal schooling, he continued his Islamic education independently.

A turning point in Al Gurg's early education came at the age of 12 when an Indian doctor invited him to study English alongside the doctor's sons. Initially hesitant about Western influences, Al Gurg's father eventually allowed him to learn English, a decision that would later prove pivotal in shaping his future.

World War II marked another defining chapter in Al Gurg's life. As a teenager, he witnessed British soldiers arriving at Dubai Creek, sparking his entrepreneurial spirit. Alongside his friend Ahmed bin Matter Albdoor, he began buying clothing from local souks and selling them to RAF soldiers, leveraging his English-speaking skills.

These early experiences in education, language acquisition, and entrepreneurship laid the foundation for Al Gurg's later success as a businessman and diplomat.

== Career ==
Easa Saleh Al Gurg began his professional journey in the 1960s by establishing the Easa Saleh Al Gurg Group (ESAG). Initially, the group was the exclusive trading partner for Grundig, a German electronics company. Over time, ESAG expanded into a conglomerate with a global presence. Founded in 1960, ESAG now includes over 30 companies in sectors such as retail, construction, manufacturing, and services. The group has partnerships with over 370 international brands, including Dunlop, British American Tobacco, Siemens, Unilever, and 3M.

ESAG has contributed to the UAE's development, being involved in projects like the Burj Khalifa, Dubai Metro, and Dubai Opera. The group's activities include trading and distribution of consumer goods, supply of building materials, engineering and consultancy services, and property development and management. With a workforce of over 4,500, the group focuses on employee development and ownership, in line with its growth strategy.

== Diplomatic service and recognition ==
In addition to his business achievements, Easa Saleh Al Gurg contributed to diplomacy and public service. He served as the UAE Ambassador to the United Kingdom and Ireland from 1991 to 2009.

Earlier, he was a member of the Deliberative Committee of the Trucial States Development Office, influencing the region's governance and development during its early years. Al Gurg received several honours for his diplomatic efforts.

He was awarded CBE (Commander in the Most Excellent Order of the British Empire) in 1990.

== Philanthropy ==
Easa Saleh Al Gurg was committed to philanthropy. His charitable activities began in the early years of the UAE's development and were formalised in October 2010 with the creation of the Easa Saleh Al Gurg Charity Foundation.

Established under Decree No. 21 by His Highness Sheikh Mohammed bin Rashid Al Maktoum, Vice President and Prime Minister of the UAE and Ruler of Dubai, the Foundation focuses on humanitarian and charitable initiatives. These include cultural programs, community-based non-profit activities, and support for education and healthcare. The Foundation reflects Al Gurg's commitment to contributing to society and improving lives.

== Legacy ==
Easa Saleh Al Gurg died on 31 March 2022, leaving behind a legacy of leadership, compassion and service. He is survived by his three daughters, Dr Raja Al Gurg, Maryam Al Gurg, and Muna Al Gurg.
