= Juma Al Majid Holding Group =

Conglomerate Company

- Type: Holding company
- Industry: Automotive, Heavy Equipment, Fast Moving Consumer Goods, Real Estate, Travel & Tourism, Contracting & Services
- Founded: 1950
- Founder: Juma Al Majid
- Headquarters: Dubai, UAE
- Key people: Khalid Al Majid (Vice-Chairman); Tarig Shalabi (Group Chief Operating Officer)
- Services: Construction, Automotive, and Real estate
- Revenue: $2 Billion Annually
- Owner: Juma Al Majid
- Number of employees: 7500+
- Website: www.al-majid.com

Juma Al Majid Holding Group is an Emirati holding company and business conglomerate headquartered in Dubai, United Arab Emirates. It was established in 1950. Juma Al Majid Group has over 35 companies with over 150 branches in the UAE and GCC in automotive, real estate development, contracting and construction services, FMCG, distribution, travel, retail, hospitality and tourism. It was founded by Juma Al Majid.

== History ==
The Juma Al Majid Holding Group was established in 1950 by Juma Al Majid. Initially, the company was primarily involved in trading activities. However, as the Emirates unified into a single nation, the company diversified into contracting, automotive, heavy equipment, real estate, FMCG and other sectors. The group also engages in financial investments and portfolio management.

In 1958, The Group’s Tyres & Batteries Division was established and signed an agreement for the distribution of Yokohama Tyres in the UAE.

In 1962, the Group entered into the FMCG sector by establishing GULFCO (Gulf Trading & Refrigerating Co. LLC). In 1967, the group established General Navigation & Commerce Co.(GENAVCO LLC), starting the supply of construction materials and equipment. In 1982, Genserv was established in Oman.

In 1971, the Group’s Contracting & Services Sector established Al Arabia, providing technical items involving Air Conditioning Systems, Building Materials & AC Accessories.

In 1988, Al Majid Motors was established, representing Kia in the UAE.

In 1991, the Group’s Travel & Tourism vertical established Sky Line Travel & Tourism LLC. Leader LLC was formed as an interior fit-out & FF&E company in 1994. In 1997, Al Majid Property was established, followed by Al Maarifa Mechanical Electrical Building Maintenance. The Group founded Awafi Foodstuff and Al Majid Investments in 1999.

In 2004, Al Arabia for Operations & Maintenance was established. In 2016, the group's automotive division introduced the Genesis brand to the UAE under Hyundai. In 2018, the group founded the Auto Body Center.

== Sectors ==
Juma Al Majid Holding Group’s businesses include sectors such as automotive, heavy equipment, and fast-moving consumer goods.

The Group’s Contracting and Services division provide turnkey electromechanical works, along with facilities management, interior fit-out, joinery, and architectural metal works. They also provide firefighting, protection, and prevention services.

Building maintenance and facilities management firm Al Maarifa Mechanical, Electrical & Building Maintenance was founded in 1997 and is a member of the Juma Al Majid Holding Group.

The Group's Travel & Tourism operation, which includes Sky Line Travel, Tourism & Shipping LLC, and Al Majid Travel LLC, provides business and leisure travel services. Sky Line Travel Tourism & Shipping LLC was founded in Sharjah in 1990 Al Majid Travel LLC collaborates with Sky Line Travel to promote leisure travel.

Al Majid Investment Co. was established in 1999 with investments in equity markets, money markets, fixed income, and equity.

Juma Al Majid Group manages operations of Taj Palace Hotel in Deira from India’s Taj Hotels Resorts and Palaces under its hospitality division.
