= Raja Al Gurg =

Emirati Businesswoman

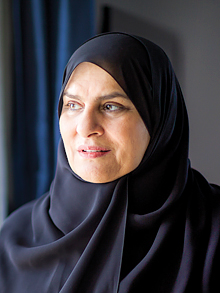
- Born: Raja Easa Saleh Al Gurg
- Citizenship: United Arab Emirates
- Education: Kuwait University
- Occupation: Managing Director Easa Saleh Al Gurg Group
- Known for: High profile Arab businesswoman

Dr. Raja Easa Al Gurg is a businesswoman in Dubai, United Arab Emirates, currently serving as the chairperson and managing director of the Easa Saleh Al Gurg Group.

Al Gurg has been recognised internationally with accolades including the highest French civilian award – the Legion of Honor Chevalier (Knight), in appreciation of her efforts in strengthening the UAE-France relations.

She is a board member of the Dubai Chamber of Commerce and Industry.

== Biography ==
Raja Easa Al Gurg graduated from Kuwait University in 1977 with a degree in English Literature. She has also done advanced courses in management, sales and marketing, human resources and the development of personal skills.

=== Education ===
Al Gurg serves as the honorary pro-chancellor at the Heriot Watt University in Dubai. Other significant positions she holds in the educational sector include the vice chairperson of the board of trustees at Mohammed Bin Rashid University of Medicine and Health Sciences, and member of board of trustees at Ajman University.

She is the Deputy Chairperson of the Board of Governors at Hamdan Bin Mohammed Smart University, a member of the Board of Directors for Dubai Academic Health Corporation, and the Vice Chairperson of the University of Dubai.

Al Gurg also contributes as a member of the Board of Directors of the Emirates Schools Establishment. She was awarded with an Honorary Doctorate at Queen’s University Belfast for economics and also conferred the Doctor of Literature (D.Litt.) honour by Amity University, India.

=== Banking ===
In March 2020, the National Bank of Fujairah appointed Raja Easa Al Gurg as the deputy chairperson of its board. She is also on the advisory board of Coutts Bank, the wealth division of the Royal Bank of Scotland Group.

=== Women empowerment ===
Al Gurg founded the Dubai Businesswomen Council, which fosters personal and professional development of businesswomen in Dubai. She is also a board member of Dubai Women’s Association.

She is also a member of the Family Business Advisory Committee, which oversees the work of the Dubai Centre for Family Businesses.

=== Philanthropy ===
A philanthropist and the chairperson of the Easa Saleh Al Gurg Charity Foundation, Al Gurg serves as the chairperson of the Al Jalila Foundation, a nonprofit organisation advancing medical education and research in the UAE.

== Published works ==
In December 2019, Raja Easa Al Gurg released her autobiography, entitled ‘Raja Al Gurg - An Autobiography.’

In 2023, she released her book, ‘The Power of Authenticity: Three Principles of Leadership Success’, in which she recounts the obstacles and triumphs she has faced during her career journey.

== Accolades ==
- Ranked among the ‘100 Most Powerful Arabs’ for 2024 by Gulf Business magazine.
- Ranked among ‘The World’s 100 Most Powerful Women’ by Forbes for 2023.
- Ranked among the Arabian Business 2023 listing of the ‘100 Most Inspiring Leaders in the Middle East.’
- Ranked second in ‘The Middle East Most Powerful Businesswomen’ listing of Forbes Middle East for 2023.

== See also ==
- Muna Al Gurg
- Easa Al-Gurg
