= Juma Al Majid =

UAE businessman (born 1930)

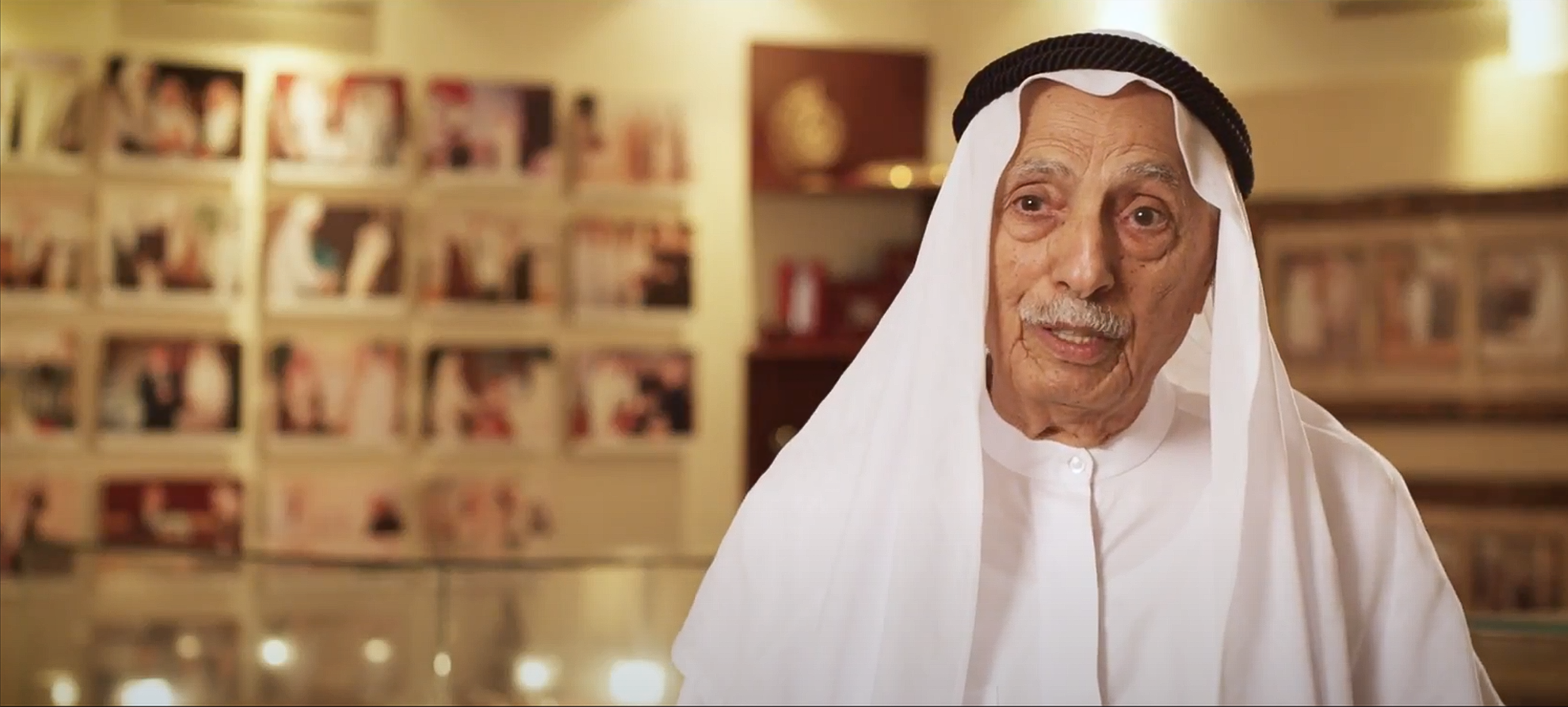
- Born: Juma Al Majid; 1930 (age 95–96); Al Shandagah, Dubai
- Education: traditional Quranic study centers (katateeb)
- Occupations: Founder and owner, Juma Al Majid Holding Group
- Spouse: Aisha Ahmad Al Ghurair
- Children: Hana, Khalid Juma Al Majid
- Parent(s): Majid Bin Abdullah Qraiban and Aisha Majid Al Ghurair
- Relatives: Juma’s brother, Rashid, and two sisters, Hamda and Shamsa
- Website: www.al-majid.com

Juma al Majid (born 1930, Dubai, United Arab Emirates) is an Emirati businessman, political adviser, and philanthropist. He is the founder and chairman of Juma Al Majid Holding Group. In 2016, Al Majid was ranked among the richest Arabs in the world.

He is known for his significant contributions to the development of the UAE's economy and society. He founded Juma Al Majid Holding Group, a diversified conglomerate with interests in trading, manufacturing, and real estate. Al Majid is also recognized for his charitable endeavors, particularly in education, healthcare and promoting cultural and social initiatives in the region.

Juma Al Majid held key positions including Chairman for Dubai Economic Council, Vice Chairman for the UAE Central Bank, Vice Chairman for Emirates Bank International Ltd, Director for Dubai Chamber of Commerce & Industry, and Board Member for AI Nisr Publishing (Gulf News).

In 1950, he established the Juma Al Majid Holding Group, which later became one of the most reputed organisations in the Middle East. The group’s verticals include real estate, travel and tourism, hospitality, investments, automobiles, contracting and commercial.

== Early life and career ==
Juma Majid was born in Al Shandagah, Dubai, in 1930 (then part of the Trucial States). He was a pearl diver's son. He received early schooling in Qur’an and Arabic at local kuttāb (traditional classes).

When Juma Al Majid turned 15, his uncle, Ahmad Majid Al Ghurair, asked him to assist him at his shop in Deira, and eventually opened a second small shop for him. He opened his business in 1950 and began by selling fabric and switched to air conditioners.

Juma met Mohammad Al Qaz, a trader who imported goods to Dubai from Kuwait and Bahrain, who become his associate and friend. Juma started helping Al Qaz with sales and in 1950, he established Juma Al Majid Holding Group.

In 1956, Al Qaz invited Juma to accompany him on trading trips to Kuwait. They would take tobacco and Omani dry lime to sell in Kuwait and Bahrain and return with fabric and watches from Switzerland and France to sell in Dubai. Soon after, Juma set up a home appliances division, with international brands. By 1958, he added a tire and battery division and signed an exclusive distribution agreement with Yokohama Tires.

In 1962, Juma Al Majid Holding Group entered the fast-moving consumer goods (FMCG), founding Gulf Trading and Distributing Co. (GULFCO), which became the exclusive UAE distributor for several of SC Johnson’s home and personal care brands. In 1967, the group established General Navigation & Commerce Co., starting the supply of construction materials and equipment.

In the late 1960s, during a visit to a Bahrain showroom, Juma observed General Electric refrigerators, which were not available in Dubai at the time. Pretending to check one of the refrigerators, he picked up the guarantee card with the company’s details. Back in Dubai, he arranged to purchase 200 air conditioners from a GE dealer in Lebanon at a reduced price to resell in Dubai. Juma also became involved in the gold trade between the UK, Switzerland, and India.

By the 1970s, his company had grown to be the second largest distributor of General Electric products, selling up to 700,000 air conditioners per year.

After the UAE Federation was created in 1971, Mohammed Al Gaz and Al Majid opened a Pepsi factory in Dubai. He also expanded his firm into carpentry and interior design.

He quit gold trading and ventured into other businesses: confectionery and watches, commercial vehicles, travel and tourism, heavy equipment, sewage treatment, real estate, and food production, apart from construction and infrastructure.

Since then, the firm has expanded into automotive, heavy equipment, fast-moving consumer goods, office equipment, travel, real estate, and contracting. He also founded Al Majid Investments, an international investment company.

Throughout his career, Al Majid acquired the franchise rights for numerous international brands in engineering, automotive, office furniture, communication, and tyres from businesses such as Samsung, Hyundai, and Hitachi.

Juma Al Majid Group manages operations of Taj Palace Hotel in Deira from India’s Taj Hotels Resorts and Palaces under its hospitality division.

Juma is also known for his contribution to the preservation of UAE culture; he established the Juma Al Majid Center for Culture and Heritage, with a library, archive, a research and publication center.

== Philanthropy ==
At the start of the 1950s, he collaborated with his colleagues Humaid Al Tayer, Abdullah Al Ghurair, and Nasir Rashed Loutah in establishing the first charitable society in Dubai, with the consent of Sheikh Rashed Bin Saeed Al Maktoum. They established Jamal Abdul Nasser Secondary School for boys and Amna Secondary Schools for girls. In 1983, Juma Al Majid founded the National Charity Schools to assist poor expatriate children in gaining a free education.

In 1987, Al Majid founded the Islamic and Arabic Studies College in Dubai which provides free education to all. This college, which accepts students from the Gulf Cooperation Council (GCC) states, is accredited by Al-Azhar University, Dar Al Uloom College, and the UAE Ministry of Higher Education.

In 1989, he established a cultural organisation known as the Juma Al Majid Center for Culture and Heritage, which holds a collection of Arab and Islamic manuscripts.

The Juma Al Majid Culture and Heritage Centre is considered one of the world’s most popular scientific and cultural heritage centres. He has made significant contributions as a member of the advisory committee for the Centre for The Middle Eastern Studies at Harvard University.

Al Majid founded the Beit Al Khair Society in 1990 and is currently its chairman. He established a public library in 1991, which later evolved into a cultural organisation known as the Juma Al Majid Center for Culture and Heritage, which holds a collection of Arab and Islamic manuscripts.

== Recognition ==
- 1992: Sultan Al Owais Award for Cultural Personality of the Year.
- 1995: Education Award, Ministry of Education, UAE
- 1998: Appreciation award from Her Highness Shaikha Fatima Bint Mubarak, Wife of the late President Shaikh Zayed Bin Sultan Al Nahyan, and Chairwoman of the General Women's Union.
- 1999: King Faisal International Award for service to Islam, Saudi Arabia.
- 1998: Hamdan Bin Rashid Award for Distinguished Academic Performance.
- 1999: Honoured by the Scientific Council of St Petersburg University for preserving Islamic heritage.
- 2001: Honoured by the Arabic Culture Society for his role in preserving Islamic and Arabic heritage, Beirut.
- 2003: Voluntary Work Award from His Highness Dr. Shaikh Sultan Bin Mohammad Al Qasimi, Member of the Supreme Council and Ruler of Sharjah.
- 2007: Sultan Al Owais Award for Scientific and Cultural Achievement.
- 2010: Honorary PhD degree from the Institute of Oriental Studies (The Russian Academy of Sciences in Moscow).
- 2010: Gibran Khalil Gibran Award for Global Responsibility Given by the Arab American Institute, Washington, D.C., USA.
- 2011: Khalifa International Award for Date Palm and Agricultural Innovation – Recognition Award Given by H.H. Sheikh Khalifa Bin Zayed Al Nahyan.
- 2014: Makhdoum Guly Fraghy Meda—awardedd by the President of Turkmenistan for contributions to the preservation of Turkmen heritage.
- 2015: GCC Award for Excellence in Philanthropy.
- 2015: UAE Pioneers Awar—— Recognized as one of the 44 Emirati pioneers by H.H. Sheikh Mohammed bin Rashid Al Maktoum.
- 2022: Honorary doctorate from the University of Sharjah.
- 2024: Juma Al Majid was honored with the Mohammed bin Rashid Al Maktoum Knowledge Award for his contributions to the dissemination and preservation of knowledge for future generations.
- 2024: Medal of Culture & Creativity—UAE’s highest cultural honor awarded by Sheikh Mohammed bin Rashid Al Maktoum.
- 2024: Mohammed bin Rashid Al Maktoum Knowledge Award—for sustained knowledge dissemination and preservation
