= Muna Al Gurg =

Emirati businesswoman

Muna Easa Al Gurg
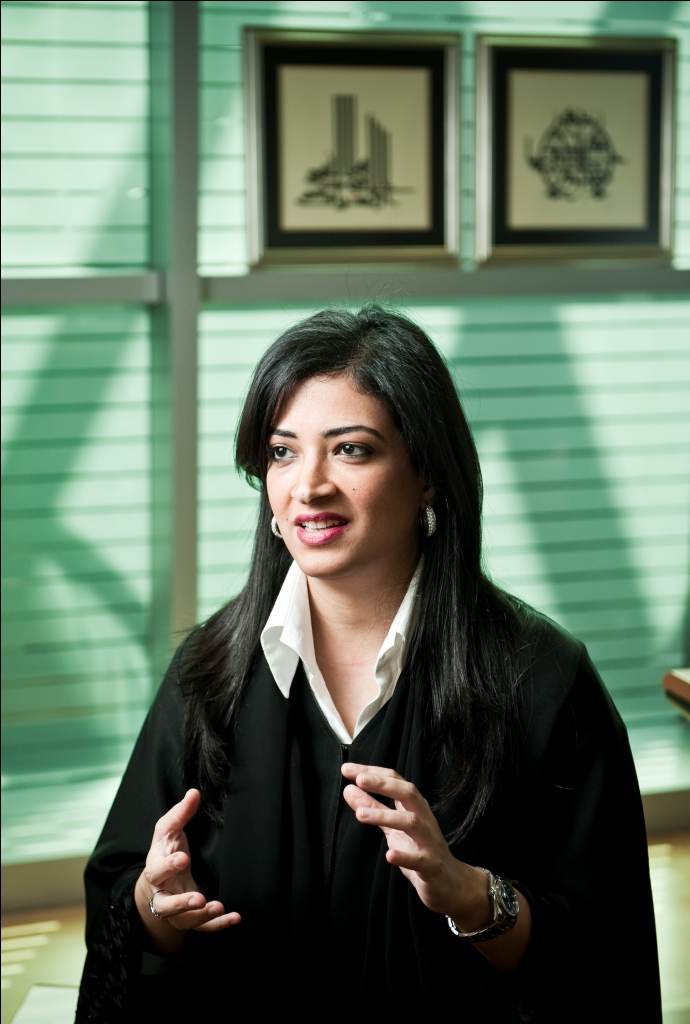
- Born: Muna Easa Al Gurg; Dubai, UAE
- Education: London Business School
- Occupations: Vice Chairperson and Director of Retail at Easa Saleh Al Gurg Group
- Years active: 2001-present
- Parent: Easa Saleh Al Gurg
- Website: https://www.algurg.com/

Muna Easa Al Gurg is an Emirati businessperson and philanthropist. She is the Vice Chairperson and Director of Retail of Easa Saleh Al Gurg Group, a conglomerate headquartered in the United Arab Emirates, and the founder of Meem Foundation.

In 2025 she was ranked 1st amongst powerful businesswomen leading the largest family-owned companies by Forbes Middle East.

In 2026, Time Magazine named her one of the 100 most influential philanthropists of the year.

== Background and career ==
Al Gurg was born in Dubai. She is the daughter of Sir Easa Saleh Al Gurg, a businessman and former Ambassador to the United Kingdom and the Republic of Ireland, and Soraya Kazim.

Al Gurg holds an MBA from London Business School and a BA in Business Administration from the American University in Dubai.

In 2001 she joined her family's business, the Easa Saleh Al Gurg Group, a conglomerate based in the United Arab Emirates, as director of marketing and communications. She worked closely with her father and founder of the business Easa Saleh Al Gurg and her eldest sister Raja Al Gurg who is managing director of the business. Since 2009, she has been a board member of the company and Director of Retail, responsible for strategy and operational development of the group’s international and local retail brands.

In July 2020, Al Gurg joined the board of HSBC Bank Middle East Limited.

In 2022, Al Gurg was appointed Vice Chairperson to the Easa Saleh Al Gurg Group.

== Philanthropy ==
In 2025, Al Gurg joined The Giving Pledge, a philanthropic initiative launched by Bill Gates, Melinda Gates and Warren Buffett.

Al Gurg is the Founder of Meem Foundation, a self-funded philanthropic foundation launched in 2024 to address challenges faced by women and girls in the Middle East & North Africa and facilitate economic empowerment and access to healthcare.

In 2021, Al Gurg donated AED 1 million to a neonatal intensive care unit in the Palestinian city of Jenin, in the West Bank.

In 2015 she launched the Muna Al Gurg Scholarship at London Business School, supporting female students as part of the school’s MBA and Executive MBA programmes.

Al Gurg has served on the board of non-profit organizations, such as the Emirates Foundation for Youth Development and Young Arab Leaders UAE. At the Easa Saleh Al Gurg Charity Foundation, she is responsible for initiatives including primary education support for underprivileged children in Zanzibar.

== Other activities ==
In 2010, Al Gurg became a Fellow of the Middle East Leadership Initiative of the Aspen Institute and a member of the Aspen Global Leadership Network.

In 2012, she was a member of the judging panel on the UAE business reality show The Entrepreneur.

Al Gurg invested in the Middle East's largest technology startup Careem which was acquired by Uber in March 2019 for $3.1 Billion.

Al Gurg was a founding board member of Endeavor UAE, the UAE-branch of a non-profit organization.

In 2024, Al Gurg, along with female director Nayla Al Khaja, co-produced the movie 'Three', the first feature movie by an Emirati female director, that starred Jefferson Hall.
