= Reem Saleh Al Gurg =

Author of children's stories

- ريم صالح القرق
- Born: United Arab Emirates
- Notable work: Wid and Walid series

Reem Saleh Al Gurg (Arabic: ريم صالح القرق) is an Emirati author of children's literature. In 2009, she became the first Arab woman to enter the Guinness World Records after she created the largest mosaic panel in the world, titled "Desert Vision."

== Career ==
Al Gurg began writing for children after searching for books for her daughter. At the time, she was living intermittently in London while pursuing education, and could not find appealing Arabic children's literature. Of course, she does not want the English language, because it's an easy language to acquire and learn.

Al Gurg's first story series, Wid and Walid, follows two children on National Day roaming the United Arab Emirates. The series was published in collaboration with the Mohammed bin Rashid Al Maktoum Knowledge Foundation.

== Education ==
- Bachelor of Science in Medical Laboratory Sciences, University of Sharjah, 2004.
- Master's degree in Nutrition from King's College, Britain.
- Ph.D. in Health Policy and Management from Bradford University.

== Position ==
- Director of Strategy & Corporate Excellence and Assistant Professor of Health Policy at Mohammed Bin Rashid University Of Medicine and Health Sciences.
- Member of the Emirates Scientists Council.

== Works ==
=== Wid and Walid ===
- ود و وليد في الثاني من ديسمبر [Wid and Walid on the eighth of December] (in Arabic). Dubai: Jerboa Books. 2010. ISBN 978-9948-447-11-5. Archived from the original on 2020-07-16.
- ود و وليد عند الطبيب [Wid and Walid at the doctor] (in Arabic). Dubai: Jerboa Books. 2010. ISBN 978-9948-447-11-5. Archived from the original on 2020-07-16.
- ود و وليد : خطة النوم [Wid and Walid: Sleep plan] (in Arabic). Dubai: Jerboa Books. 2010. ISBN 978-9948-447-11-5. Archived from the original on 2020-07-16.
- ود و وليد في طريق العودة [Wid and Walid on the way back] (in Arabic). Dubai: Jerboa Books. 2010. ISBN 978-9948-447-11-5. Archived from the original on 2020-07-16.
- ود و وليد في سوق الخضار [Wid and Walid in the vegetable market] (in Arabic). Dubai: Jerboa Books. 2010. ISBN 978-9948-447-11-5. Archived from the original on 2020-07-16.
- ود و وليد : ماذا تحب ؟ [Wid and Walid: What do you like?] (in Arabic). Dubai: Jerboa Books. 2010. ISBN 978-9948-447-11-5. Archived from the original on 2020-07-16.
- ود و وليد : يوم في الخيمة [Wid and Walid: A day in the tent] (in Arabic). Dubai: Jerboa Books. 2010. ISBN 978-9948-447-11-5. Archived from the original on 2020-07-16.

=== Other books ===
Book	Language	Publisher	Year	Number of pages	ISBN	Source
Al-Eid Cakes (Arabic: kaek aleid)	Arabic	Beirut, Jarrous Press	2013	32	978-9953-468-17-4	
Maryam's gifts (Arabic: hadaya maryam)	Arabic	Beirut, Jarrous Press	2014	18	978-9953-587-04-2	
Spectrum colors in my home (Arabic: 'alwan altiyf fi dari)	Arabic	Beirut, Jarrous Press	2015	24	978-9953-587-10-3	
Shall I bring you a little elephant? (Arabic: hal 'ajlib lak fylaan sghyraan)	Arabic	Abu Dhabi, AlBorj Media	2016		978-9948-497-83-7	
Al Marjan Restaurant (Arabic: mateam almarjan)	Arabic	Sharjah, Kalimat Publishing & Distributions	2016	36	978-9948-02-508-5	
The Pink Palace on the Moon (Arabic: Alqasr alwardi ala saṭḥ al-qamar)	Arabic	Abu Dhabi, AlBorj Media	2016	28	978-9948-02-229-9	
The Ostrich Naema (Arabic: naema alnaeama)	Arabic	Abu Dhabi, Bidaya Media	2017	32	978-9948-02-720-1	
Alsadra Honey (Arabic: easal alsadra)	Arabic	Sharjah, Kalimat Publishing & Distributions	2017	36	978-9948-10-251-9	
The Little Jerboa (Arabic: alyarbue alsaghir)	Arabic	Sharjah, Kalimat Publishing & Distributions	2018	25	978-9948-39-067-1	
The Gorgeous Bih (Arabic: bih albahia)	Arabic	Abu Dhabi, AlBorj Media	2019	26	978-9948-37-729-0	
Smile for the Picture (Arabic: 'abtasim lilsuwra)	Arabic	Sharjah, Wow publishing house	2019	28	978-9948-36-751-2	

- الجمل والتنين [The Camel and Dragon] (in Arabic). Abu Dhabi: AlBorj Media. 2019. ISBN 978-9948-38-163-1. Archived from the original on 2021-06-14.
- سباق الصباح [Morning Race] (in Arabic). Sharjah: Kalimat Publishing & Distributions. 2019. ISBN 978-9948-38-776-3. Archived from the original on 2021-06-14.
- خمس وصفات للسعادة [Five recipes for Happiness] (in Arabic). Abu Dhabi: AlBorj Media. 2020. ISBN 978-9948-36-610-2. Archived from the original on 2021-06-14.
