= Harvey Jones Kitchens =

British kitchen designer and retailer

- Type: Privately held
- Industry: Retail & Manufacturing
- Founded: 1977; 49 years ago
- Founder: Roy Griffiths
- Headquarters: United Kingdom
- Key people: John Curwen (MD); Geoff Brady (Chairman)
- Number of employees: 176 (2016)
- Website: harveyjones.com

Harvey Jones Kitchens (Harvey Jones Limited & Harvey Jones Manufacturing Limited) is a British kitchen designer, retailer and manufacturer. Established in 1977 by Roy Griffiths, Harvey Jones Kitchens sold hand-built, freestanding kitchen furniture.

The company's product range developed into the manufacture of fitted furniture. The company’s first showroom was in Fulham with others opening in Battersea, Islington, Leamington Spa and Stratford-upon-Avon. Incorporated in 1986, the company has 32 showrooms across the UK. By 2017, John Curwen was the Managing Director.

== History ==
Early years 1977 - 2007

During the early years, furniture was hand-built in the founders’ garden workshop. As demand grew production was moved to a small workshop in Murrow, close to the company’s current main workshop. Over the subsequent years new showrooms were opened in Sheen, Harrogate, Hove, St Albans and Worcester.

In 2004 Harvey Jones acquired a larger manufacturing site in the middle of Wisbech and transferred manufacturing from Murrow to Wisbech. By 2007, the company had transferred all manufacturing to this site.

First buyout 2007

In 2007, founder Roy Griffiths sold the business in a management buyout backed by private equity firm YFM, and the company began to expand by opening new showrooms. Further investment was also made in expanding the capacity of the workshops, installations department and more sophisticated IT systems. Geoff Brady joined the company as non-executive chairman in 2008, having displayed significant retail experience with both Matalan and CarpetRight.

Expansion 2007 - 2016

By 2007, all showrooms were reporting through Harvey Jones Limited. At the time of the management buyout in 2007, there were showrooms in Battersea, Fulham, Harrogate, Leamington Spa, Sheen, St. Albans, Tunbridge Wells and Worcester, and two further rebranded showrooms in Islington and Hove.

In 2008 showrooms were opened in Bristol, Winchester and Bath, followed in 2009 by Hampstead, Marlow and Oxford and in 2010 Wilmslow and Cambridge. In 2011 by the first showroom in Scotland opened in Edinburgh, and also showrooms in Guildford, Brentwood and Cheltenham, taking the total to 18. A Glasgow showroom was opened in January 2012, followed by others in Bournemouth and Chester and, in December 2012, one in Chichester. In July 2013, two further showrooms were added, in Notting Hill and Chislehurst. In early 2014 a showroom in Cardiff was opened, followed by showrooms in Nottingham in the spring and Milton Keynes at the end of the year. In 2018 they opened their 32nd showroom in the Mailbox shopping centre, Birmingham.

Second Buyout - 2017

A secondary management buyout in August 2017 was backed by Allied Irish Bank.

== Operations ==
The manufacturing arm of the company is based in Murrow, near Wisbech (Cambridgeshire). Northbrink Limited changed its name to Harvey Jones Manufacturing Limited in 2012.

== Recognition ==
In 2009, the Linear range was awarded ‘Best Kitchen System’ at the Grand Designs Awards.

In 2011, their 'Linear' range won ‘Best Luxury Kitchen’ at the House Beautiful Awards.

In 2017, the Harvey Jones 'Smile Stool', designed in conjunction with furniture designer Sarah Kay, was awarded a Design Guild Mark by the Furniture Makers’ Company. During 2017 the company was also shortlisted as Best Kitchen Retailer at the Northern Design Awards.
