= Abdulla Fareed Al Gurg =

Emirati businessman

Abdulla Al Gurg is a businessperson. He is a member of the Board of Directors and Director of Advisory Board of Easa Saleh Al Gurg Group. He is the grandson of founder Easa Saleh Al Gurg.

== Early life and education ==
Al Gurg is the oldest son of Mrs Raja Al Gurg, the managing director of Easa Saleh Al Gurg Group. He earned his bachelor's degree in marketing and management from the American University of Sharjah, after graduating from the Dubai National School. Al Gurg also holds a master's certificate in management concepts from Regis University, Denver, Colorado.

== Career ==
Al Gurg became Group General Manager of the Easa Saleh Al Gurg Group in October 2009. Before taking up his present position, Al Gurg was executive project director of The Tiger Woods Dubai. His first job was in the sales department of a call centre at Tejari.com, an e-commerce hub in Dubai.

He is on the board of directors of the National Bank of Fujairah. He is the Chairman of the Advisory Board of the Emirates E-Sports Association.

== Personal life ==
Abdulla Al Gurg has four children. Al Gurg is a member of the Board of Directors of the Easa Saleh Al Gurg Charity Foundation. In recognition of the Foundation‘s charitable efforts, he was the Lloyds TSB Torchbearer for the London 2012 Olympic Torch Relay.
