= Easa Al-Gurg =

Emirati businessman

Easa Al Gurg
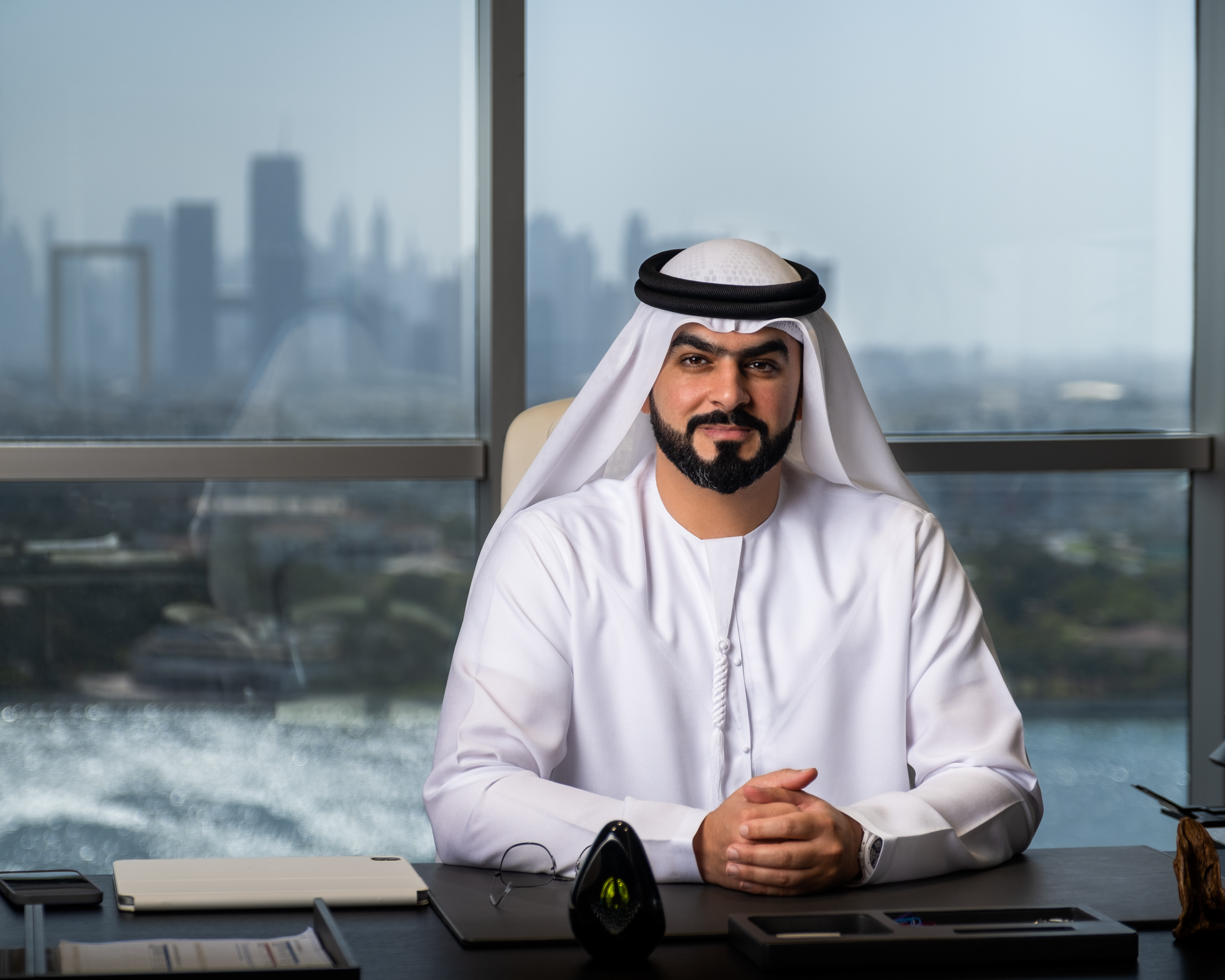

Personal details
- Occupation: Easa Saleh Al Gurg Group (ESAG) Company CEO

Easa Al Gurg is an Emirati businessman, entrepreneur, and investor based in the United Arab Emirates. He currently serves as the Group CEO of Easa Saleh Al Gurg Group (ESAG). He is the grandson of late Easa Saleh Al Gurg, recognized as the first Emirati banker and a prominent figure in Emirati diplomacy.

== Career ==
Easa joined ESAG in August 2010 as the General Manager of Scientechnic, the group's flagship entity and a turnkey engineering company. In May 2021 he was appointed Group CEO.

Easa Al Gurg serves on the Boards of the Dubai Chamber of Commerce and the National Bank of Fujairah (NBF), reinforcing his leadership in the UAE’s business landscape. His appointment to the NBF Board of Directors was formally announced in early 2025 during the bank’s recent General Assembly. Concurrently, H.H. Sheikh Mohammed bin Rashid Al Maktoum, Vice President and Prime Minister of the UAE and Ruler of Dubai approved the new Boards of Directors for the Dubai Chamber of Commerce. In addition to these, he also serves on the board of the Al Gurg Charity Foundation, which was established by royal decree in October 2010.

As the Group CEO, Easa prioritizes expansion into new business sectors and markets, customer engagement innovation, employee ownership, and market adaptability.

== ESAG Group ==
The Easa Saleh Al Gurg Group LLC (ESAG), founded in 1960 by the late Easa Saleh Al Gurg, is a multidivisional conglomerate with over 27 companies. The group's businesses span retail, building and construction, industrial sectors, and joint ventures. Operating for nearly seven decades, ESAG is one of the oldest business family groups in the UAE.

ESAG's portfolio includes 27 companies across various sectors such as retail, building and construction, industrial, and real estate. The group operates in the United Arab Emirates and Oman, as well as across Asia, the Middle East, Africa, parts of America, Australia, and New Zealand.

ESAG is a regional partner for 370 international brands, including Siemens, Osram, British American Tobacco, Dunlop, Armitage Shanks, Viking Johnson, SieMatic, Danfoss, Interface, Parador, Smeg, and 3M. The group's joint ventures include AkzoNobel, Al Gurg Unilever, Siemens LLC, Siemens Healthineers, Al Gurg Fosroc, and Al Gurg Smollan.

In terms of sustainability initiatives, ESAG has invested in eco-friendly infrastructure and collaborated on joint ventures with Siemens Industrial and Siemens Energy for sustainable investments.
