= SieMatic =

German kitchen manufacturer

SieMatic Möbelwerke GmbH & Co. KG
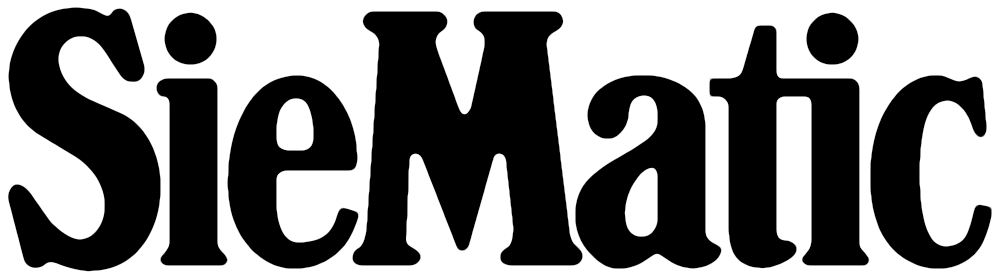
- Company type: private
- Industry: manufacturing
- Founded: 1929; 97 years ago
- Founder: August Siekmann
- Headquarters: Löhne, Germany
- Areas served: worldwide
- Key people: Ulrich W. Siekmann; Silvia Weppler
- Products: kitchen cabinets
- Revenue: €130.1 million (2007)
- Number of employees: ~500 (2012)
- Website: siematic.com

SieMatic Möbelwerke GmbH & Co. KG is a German kitchen manufacturer. The company was founded in 1929 and has its headquarters in Löhne, North Rhine-Westphalia. It delivers its products to over 60 countries worldwide. SieMatic is considered among the best-known German luxury brands. Since 1998, Ulrich W. Siekmann has been Managing Director of SieMatic, the third generation of his family to run the company.

In 2007, the company achieved sales of €130.1 million and in 2012 it had roughly 500 employees.

== History ==
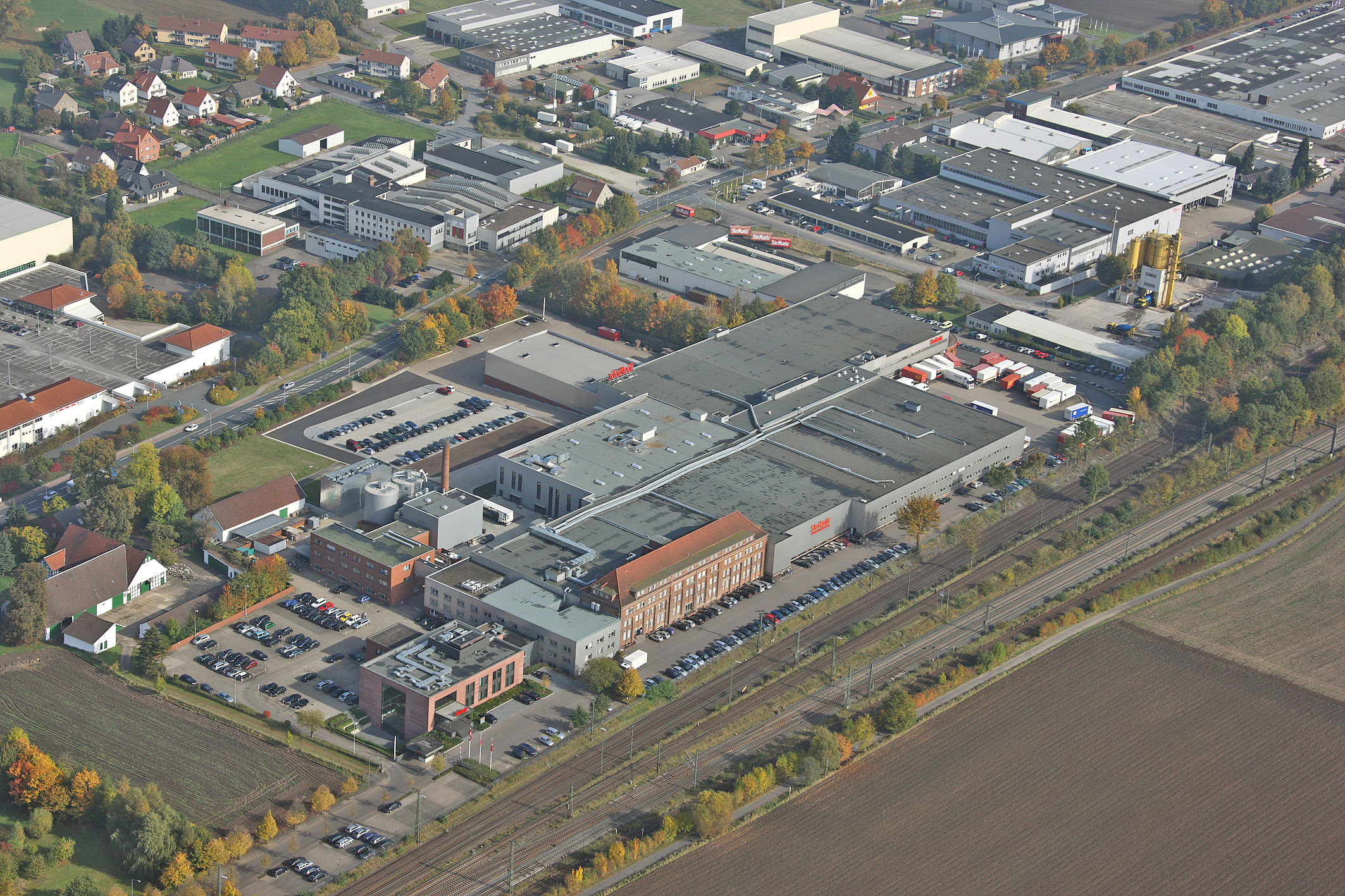
Headquarters in Löhne (2008)

In the 1920s, August Siekmann established a factory to produce kitchen furniture on the site of the Cologne-Minden Railway Company. During the Second World War, large sections of the factory site were destroyed, yet the company resumed kitchen production in 1946. In 1960, SieMatic unveiled the first kitchen with integrated grip handles for a handle-free door front. From that point on, the entire company went by SieMatic as both its brand and official company name. At the beginning of the 1970s, the capacity of the original plant in Löhne was significantly expanded. For the first time, the company achieved sales of over 100 million Deutsche Mark and established subsidiaries in other European countries. In 1979, SieMatic entered the US market, setting up a subsidiary there. In the 1990s, SieMatic was among the first kitchen furniture manufacturers using medium-density fiberboard (MDF) for its products. In 2004, SieMatic opened a showroom center at its headquarters, the "August Wilhelm Siekmann Forum", which is still open today. The company also set up a new logistics center near the Löhne headquarters.

== Products ==
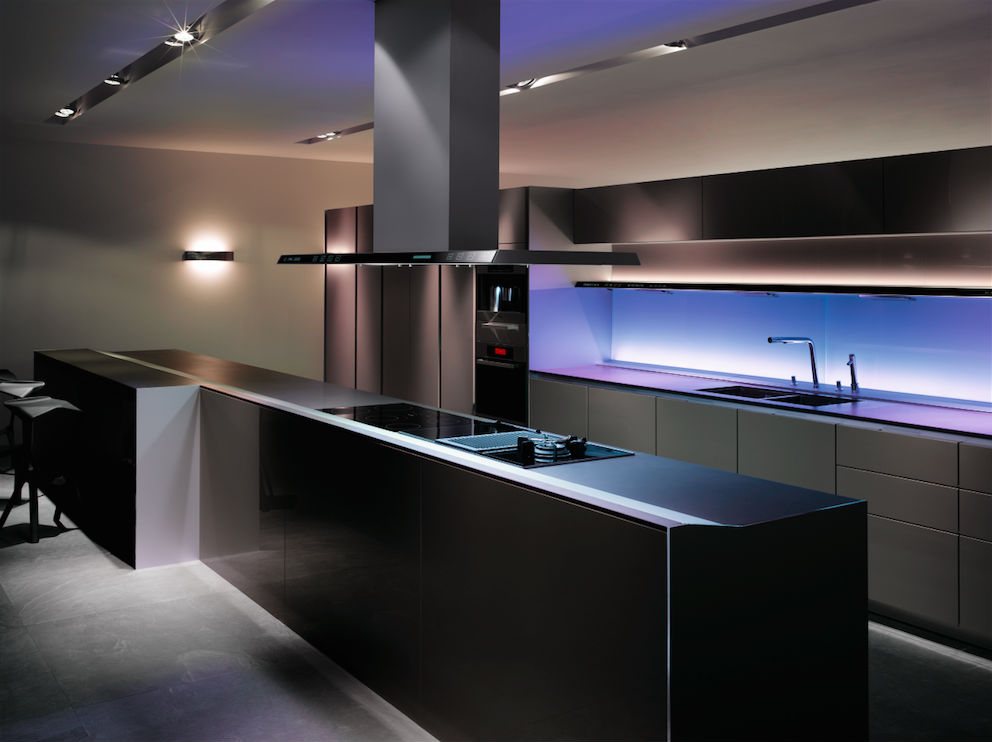
SieMatic S1 black edition (2007)

SieMatic manufactures kitchen furnishings including cabinetry, countertops, interior organization systems and accessories. One of the company's most well-known products is the S1, a handle-free kitchen introduced in 2008 that integrated lighting and multimedia systems into cabinetry, winning various awards including the Red Dot Design Award. Since then, SieMatic has also offered the S2 and S3, similar products at different price points. More recently SieMatic began categorizing kitchens by "style collections" instead of product series. As of 2016, the company style collections are divided into Classic, Pure and Urban.

For several years, the wood chips and dust accumulated during production in the SieMatic factory in Löhne have been collected and used as an energy source to heat the company headquarters. As of 2016, SieMatic has a plant site totaling over 70,000 m^{2} (17.3 acres).

== Locations ==
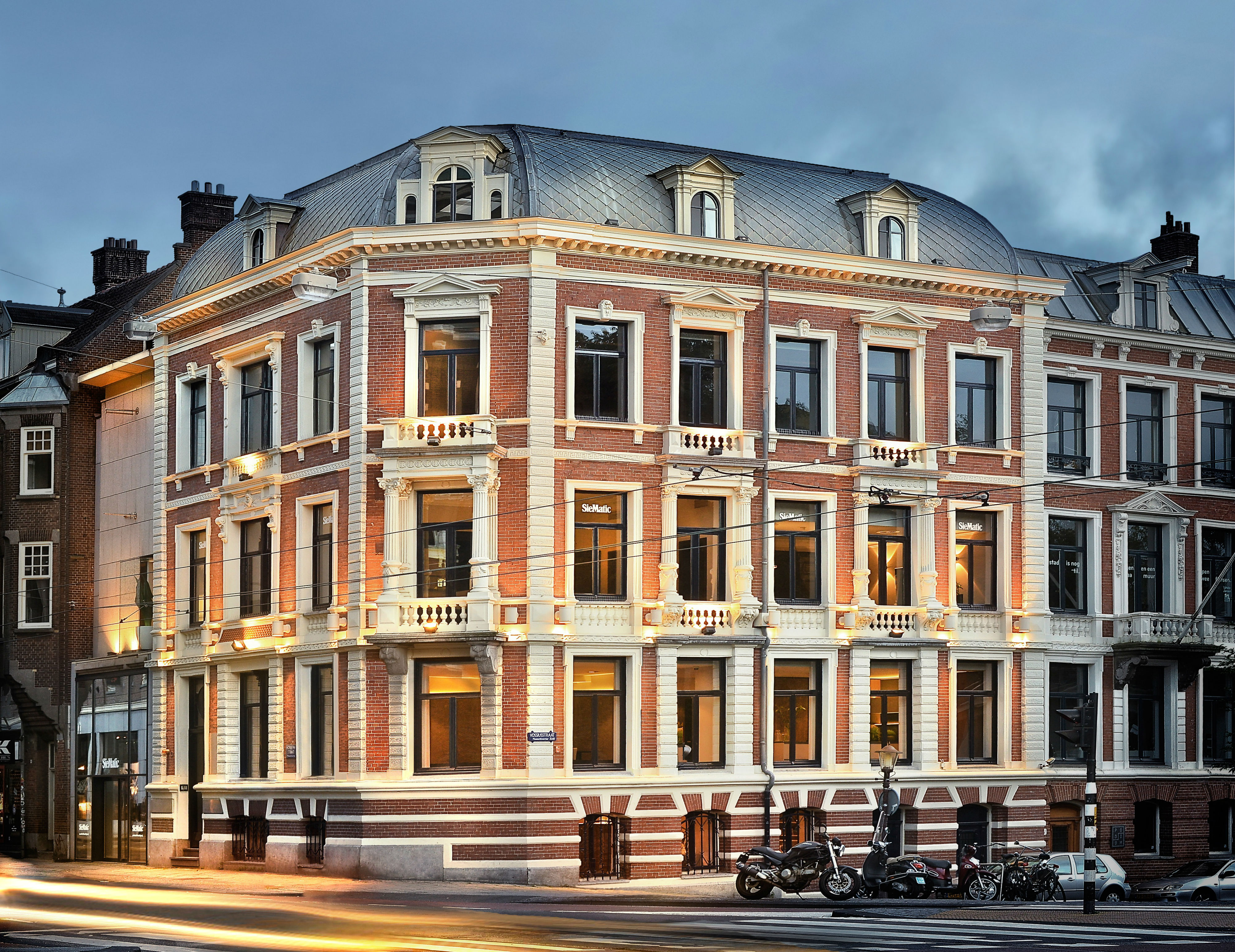
SieMatic Vondelpark store (2014)

SieMatic dealers are located in cities across the globe including Sydney, Chicago, Dubai, Dublin, Oslo, and Seoul. Company-owned and -operated flagship stores include Amsterdam, Beijing and New York. The Midtown Manhattan showroom won the "Kitchen and Bath Business" award for "Showroom of the Year 2014". SieMatic is also involved in the multi-unit market, and its kitchens feature in luxury developments such as the Ritz-Carlton Residences in Chicago.

SieMatic's clientele also includes former Pope Benedict XVI, who had a SieMatic kitchen put in the Apostolic Palace. The soccer team Arminia Bielefeld has SieMatic kitchens in its stadium luxury boxes.
