= 1922 Dhabyani coup d'état =

Coup in the United Arab Emirates

Coordinates: 24.28°N 54.22°E

1922 Dhabyani coup
- Emirate of Abu Dhabi in the United Arab Emirates
Date	August 22, 1922
Location	Emirate of Abu Dhabi
Result	Coup Successful: Sheikh Hamdan Al Nahyan killed; Sheikh Sultan Al Nahyan installed; Sultan deposed in a counter coup in 1926

Belligerents
(Emirate of Abu Dhabi) Abu Dhabi	(Emirate of Abu Dhabi) Junior Al Nahyan

Commanders and leaders
(Emirate of Abu Dhabi) Hamdan Al Nahyan †	(Emirate of Abu Dhabi) Sultan Al Nahyan (Emirate of Abu Dhabi) Hazza Al Nahyan (Emirate of Abu Dhabi) Saqr Al Nahyan

Units involved
(Emirate of Abu Dhabi) Hamdan loyalists	(Emirate of Abu Dhabi) Sultan loyalists

Casualties and losses
4 (including Hamdan)	none

In 1922 Sheikh Sultan Al Nahyan, with a coalition of his brothers Hazza and Saqr staged a palace coup in Abu Dhabi killing their brother Hamdan, the ruling emir at the time, and crowned Sultan in his place.

== Background ==
In 1909 longtime ruler of Abu Dhabi, Zayed Al Nahyan "The Great" died. In Islam there is no stringent monarchical inheritance laws, instead, successors typically are chosen via Shura, although Abu Dhabi's colonial overlord, the British Empire, had been pressuring the Trucial States to adopt primogeniture, this would not be adopted in Abu Dhabi until another palace coup in 1966. Zayed's eldest son Khalifa at the urging of his wife who feared for his life if he inherited, declined the throne, with it instead passing to Zayed's second eldest son Tahnoun. However, Tahnoun would die young of illness in 1912 again reopening the issue of succession. Hamdan, Zayed's fifth eldest son would inherit the throne from his brother and become the new emir, passing over several of Zayed's older sons.

== Coup ==
=== Planning ===
Hamdan's rule was far from secure, and wasn't helped by an economic collapse in 1920–1921 within the emirate as the economy was almost entirely reliant on pearling, with the pearl fields running dry due to over fishing. However, economic conditions for a coup where only a pretense, with the real reason for the coup being inter-personal family rivalries. Hamdan, who had no adult sons of his own, had begun grooming his older brother Sultan's sons to succeed him, which would've bypassed Sultan. Additionally, Hamdan had earned the ire of nomadic Bedouins due to his insistence that they pay more taxes due to the economic shortfall and for sending tribute to Saudi Arabia. Sultan was able to convince his other, still politically active, brothers Hazza and Saqr to stage a coup and instead determine the new emir by Shura.

=== Events ===
On Tuesday, August 22, Sultan entered the Qasr Al Hosn alongside Saqr and four Bedouin retainers from the Bani Yas, as it was just after the midday majlis Hamdan was resting in the shade of the central courtyard with some of his advisors. Sultan then promptly opened fire on his brother point blank, killing him instantly, as the other members of his party opened fire on Hamdan's courtiers killing three of them. Sultan then sealed the fort, secured the keys to the treasury, and sent envoys to his brothers and tribal leaders.

== Aftermath ==
=== New emir ===
After the coup about 20 male elders from the Al Nahyan met in the fort to determine who the new emir would be. Largely divided along tribal lines, Sultan saw support from the al‑Qubaisāt family of his mother, as well as the Manasir and most of the Suwdān. Hazza, who shared Sultan's mother, received the support of the rest of the Suwdān, and almost all of the Bani Yas, but was largely sidelined as he was unable to arrive in Abu Dhabi in time for the meeting. Saqr, who was present during the coup, but had a different mother, saw marginal support from fringe tribal leaders, with the main bulk of his support coming from his mother's family, the Al Bu Falasah of Dubai and merchants that supported inter-emirati relations.

The British also reported that Saqr had promised tax breaks to Wahhabists which they viewed as one of the principle reasons he wasn't chosen. Seeking a ruler that could lead both the coastal cities and the tribal hinterland, votes weren't held by head, which would give the Bani Yas a huge advantage, instead votes where held by section or tribe. The British were a non-factor during this council, as the political resident was in Bushire at the time, 600 km away from Abu Dhabi and was unable to react until after the coup. Instead Khalifa served as a kingmaker, while not seeking the throne himself, he threatened to stage a counter coup if Saqr was installed, and said that he would "tolerate" the rule of Sultan. Due to these factors Sultan was selected as the new emir.

=== Destabilization ===
The coup would destabilize Abu Dhabi for generations. In 1926, after Sultan failed to resolve the economic crisis, and had cut his brother's allowances, there would be another palace coup that would see Sultan dead and Saqr installed as emir without consultation from the family. However, Saqr's rule too would be short lived, as the paranoid Saqr viewed Khalifa as a potential treat and plotted his murder, resulting in Khalifa to coordinate with the council of elders to stage a third coup in 1928.

After this third coup Khalifa and the family council listened to the advice of the British and crowned Sultan's son Shakhbut as the new emir, as he was the eldest son of the last legitimate emir. However, Shakhbut too would fail to fix the economic crisis, especially after oil was discovered.

The Saudis attempted to back another coup in the 1950s to install Saqr's kids in exchange for the disputed Buraimi Oasis, but this coup would fail after international arbitration found in favor of Abu Dhabi. Afterwards Shakhbut, seeking to return Abu Dhabi to its traditional roots, outlawed stone buildings and new construction, and as such a fourth coup, this time in 1966 crowned his younger brother Zayed, finally ending the political instability.

== See also ==
- 1926 Dhabyani coup d'état
- 1928 Dhabyani coup d'état
- 1954-1955 Dhabyani coup attempt
- 1966 Dhabyani coup d'état
- 2011 Dhabyani coup attempt
