= 1926 Dhabyani coup d'état =

Coup in the United Arab Emirates

Coordinates: 24.28°N 54.22°E

1926 Dhabyani coup
- Emirate of Abu Dhabi in the United Arab Emirates
| Date | August 4, 1926 |
| Location | Emirate of Abu Dhabi |
| Result | Coup Successful: Sheikh Sultan Al Nahyan deposed and executed; Sheikh Saqr Al Nahyan installed; Saqr deposed in a counter coup in 1928 |

Belligerents
| (Emirate of Abu Dhabi) Abu Dhabi | (Emirate of Abu Dhabi) Junior Al Nahyan |

Commanders and leaders
| (Emirate of Abu Dhabi) Sultan Al Nahyan † (Emirate of Abu Dhabi) Khalid Al Nahyan (WIA) | (Emirate of Abu Dhabi) Saqr Al Nahyan (Emirate of Abu Dhabi) Hazzan Al Nahyan |

Units involved
| (Emirate of Abu Dhabi) Sultan loyalists | (Emirate of Abu Dhabi) Saqr loyalists |

In 1926 Sheikh Saqr Al Nahyan, who had helped his brother, the then current emir of Abu Dhabi, Sultan Al Nahyan stage a coup in 1922, staged his own coup to take the throne for himself.

== Background ==
In the 1920's Abu Dhabi would undergo an economic collapse due to the pearl fields in their territories going dry due to over fishing. Hamdan Al Nahyan had been emir since 1912, succeeding his brother Tahnoun who became emir in 1909 following their fathers death, and had died young.

Believing that the economic crisis was due to Hamdan's poor management, three of his brothers Hazza, Sultan, and Saqr conspired to overthrow him, doing so in 1922, with Sultan killing Hamdan during the coup and being crowned emir due to him having some support within the Al Nahyan council of elders. However, the coup didn't resolve the economic crisis, which only continued to worsen due to the political uncertainty.

== Plot ==
Sultan, attempting to cut state spending, canceled his brothers allowances which turned them against him. Meanwhile the family council abandoned Sultan due to his failure to address the economic crisis. Sensing he was in imminent danger from a plot from either the family council or one of his brothers, Sultan had his sons Hazza and Shakhbut sent into exile in Buraimi on July 12, 1926.

On August 4, 1926, Saqr invited Sultan to a dinner. There, Saqr shot and killed Sultan, as well as wounding Sultan's son Khalid who was able to escape and sought refuge at the home of his mother's family, the Qubaisat. Saqr then proclaimed himself ruler, and was accepted by the people of Abu Dhabi.

== Aftermath ==
Despite his role in the earlier coup, and him now being emir by gunpoint, Saqr was not well received by the Al Nahyan due to him being raised primarily with his mother's family, the Al-Bu Falasah, in Dubai. An outsider in the family, he was politically isolated and sought to ally with Saudi Arabia to counteract this isolation.

Saqr's first act was to send own son Dhiyab to Buraimi with a forged letter from Sultan asking his two sons Hazza and Shakbut, to return to Abu Dhabi on urgent business as if Sultan was still alive, while in reality Saqr would kill them both as soon as they entered the country. However, both had already learned of the death of their father, and had found refuge, and military support, from the Dawahir tribe and traveled around the gulf in exile in Dubai and later Qatar, where they started to organize with the Qubaisat to stage a coup.

Unable to deal with Sultan's sons, Saqr began to engineer a plot to kill his oldest brother Khalifa and his son Muhammad, however, Khalifa would learn of the plot and return to politics, and begin to seek allies within the council of elders to topple Saqr. (Note: This plot was wholly independent of Shakbut and Hazza's plot with the Qubaisat which never progressed far due to Saqr securing the Dhabyani navy preventing the brothers from crossing from Qatar.)

This, combined with news of his negotiations with the Saudis was enough to spur Khalifa, Khalid, and the family council into staging a third coup in 1928 to ultimately crown Sultan's eldest son Shakhbut with British backing. Saqr's kids would be sent into exile, and they would attempt to orchestrate their own coup in 1955 with Saudi backing, but this was ultimately called off.

== See also ==
- 1922 Dhabyani coup d'état
- 1928 Dhabyani coup d'état
- 1954-1955 Dhabyani coup attempt
- 1966 Dhabyani coup d'état
- 2011 Dhabyani coup attempt
