= 1954–1955 Dhabyani coup attempt =

Coup in the United Arab Emirates

Coordinates: 24.28°N 54.22°E

1954–1955 Dhabyani coup
- Part of Buraimi dispute
- Emirate of Abu Dhabi in the United Arab Emirates
Date	1954–1955
Location	Emirate of Abu Dhabi
Result	Coup Foiled: Sheikh Shakhbut Al Nahyan remains in power

Belligerents
(Emirate of Abu Dhabi) Abu Dhabi; United Kingdom	(Emirate of Abu Dhabi) Junior Al Nahyan; Saudi Arabia

Commanders and leaders
(Emirate of Abu Dhabi) Shakhbut Al Nahyan (Emirate of Abu Dhabi) Zayed bin Sultan Al Nahyan	(Emirate of Abu Dhabi) Zayed bin Saqr Al Nahyan (Emirate of Abu Dhabi) Diab Al Nahyan

Units involved
(Emirate of Abu Dhabi) Shakhbut loyalists (Trucial States) Trucial Oman Scouts	(Emirate of Abu Dhabi) Bribed tribes (Saudi Arabia) Saudi Expedition

From 1954 to 1955 two princes of the house of Al Nahyan; Zayed and Diab, received Saudi backing to stage a coup to retake the throne of Abu Dhabi which their father, Saqr, lost in a coup in 1928. This came amidst significant tension between Saudi Arabia and the United Kingdom over the future of the Trucial States, with the Saudi government hoping a friendly Abu Dhabi would cede the Buraimi Oasis, which they were attempting to take over. However, an international tribunal would find in favor of Abu Dhabi in the territorial dispute, with one of the terms of the ruling being the Saudi cessation of support for the plot.

== Background ==
In the 1920s Abu Dhabi would be rocked by three coups dubbed the fratricides, first in 1922 when Hamdan Al Nahyan was deposed and killed by his brother Sultan Al Nahyan with help from his two other brothers Hazza and Saqr and secondly in 1926 when Saqr killed Sultan and took the throne for himself. Each of these brothers argued that their siblings were unfit to rule due to a prolonged economic downturn caused by depletion of pearl fields. However, before any of them could implement policies to improve the economy, they would be toppled by another brother, worsening the crisis.

In 1928 the United Kingdom intervened, and assisted the Al Nahyan family council, who had already begun to plot a third coup which would ultimately see Saqr killed and install Sultan's son Shakhbut Al Nahyan as the new Sheik and puppet of the family council. The British had hoped that stringent codified primogeniture succession laws would resolve the political crisis the emirate was facing, and viewed Sultan as the last legitimate Sheik, and as such demanded the installation of his son Shakhbut, hoping that their intervention would prevent further palace coups. Between fratricides each brother would exile the other's children and their supporters to other emirates including Saqr's children following the 1928 coup, namely Dubai, resulting in a large population of Dhabyani expatriates eagerly hoping Shakhbut's reign would restore stability and economic prosperity, allowing for their return.

However, the economy only continued to worsen, with the British estimating that Abu Dhabi was only producing 1/10th its trade value at the start of World War II when compared to the end of World War I. The British had leveraged this and pressured various emirates to allow them to construct naval facilities and RAF bases across the region, whose rent would in turn become a large chunk of the emirate's economy, making them further dependent on the Empire. In 1939, following a similar deal made by Dubai in 1937, Shakhbut signed an extensive deal with the British Iraqi Petroleum Company who would explore for natural gas and oil in Abu Dhabi, paying a yearly rent and bonus if oil is found, but with the proven fields being conceded to the company for a period of 75 years. This largely resolved the economic crisis, however, it made the emirate wholly dominated by foreign business interests.

By the early 1950s Shakhbut had persevered against his family's elders and was now ruling as Sheik in his own right, and sought to turn the country back to its more conservative and Islamist roots. He banned all new construction in the country, including that of roads and restored the 19th century practice of banning stone structures. With the money he was making from the oil exploration deals he constructed a lavish palace and fort to exert control over the city.

== Plot ==
=== 1930s ===
Two of Saqr's five sons, Diab and Zayed, had been plotting against Shakhbut since the early 1930s in Dubai, viewing the Great Depression as causing enough financial distress to facilitate their return them to power. However, in 1938 family elders made peace with Saqr's branch of the family, offering to end their exile if they vow to never name a child after Saqr and were forbidden from marrying back into the main family. Diab and Zayed agreed, but once back in Abu Dhabi began to make contact with agents from Saudi Arabia who showed little support for staging a coup with the plot ultimately fizzling out.

=== Renewed Saudi interest ===
The Saudis would change their mind on their support of the brothers by the late 1940s and early 1950s as Wahhabi interest in the gulf was renewed. The Saudi government had sent an armed expedition to Buraimi, where their leader married into the local tribe and delivered extensive gifts and bribes in an effort to buy their allegiance and the surrounding territory due to potential oil reserves. However, the government of Abu Dhabi, largely backed by the Trucial Oman Scouts and the regional governor Zayed bin Sultan Al Nahyan, was able to repel this incursion.

Afterwards the Saudis sought underhanded methods to gain control over the territory. They hoped that with backing from the Arabian-American Oil Company and its American counterparts; Standard Oil of California and the Texas Oil Company, that the brothers Diab and Zayed would be able to stage a coup and install a pro-Saudi government that would cede the territory. British intelligence and forces loyal to Shakhbut uncovered that the Saudis and the princes had bought the loyalty of 28 tribal leaders through bribes and were preparing to assassinate Shakhbut. Other leaders where offered bribes, including Shakhbut's brother Zayed, however, he would reject it. Shortly after an international tribunal found in favor of Abu Dhabi over the status of Buraimi, the Saudis where forced to back down. Cut off from Saudi money, and failing to make any inroads within Abu Dhabi proper, tribal leaders started to defect to Shakhbut's side in 1955, spelling the end of the coup plot.

== Aftermath ==
Despite preserving his rule for the time being, Shakhbut still failed to fix the emirate's growing economic crisis. His refusal to westernize, to use banks, to invest in infrastructure, expand the oil industry or halt the growth of pan-Arab socialism among Arab migrant workers led to his brother Zayed bin Sultan Al Nahyan to coordinate with the British government to stage his own coup in 1966. Zayed would go on to become one of the founding fathers of the United Arab Emirates which he helped federalize in 1971.

== See also ==
- 1922 Dhabyani coup d'état
- 1926 Dhabyani coup d'état
- 1928 Dhabyani coup d'état
- 1966 Dhabyani coup d'état
- 2011 Dhabyani coup attempt
