= 1928 Dhabyani coup d'état =

Coup in the United Arab Emirates

Coordinates: 24.28°N 54.22°E

1928 Dhabyani coup
- Emirate of Abu Dhabi in the United Arab Emirates
Date	January 1, 1928
Location	Emirate of Abu Dhabi
Result	Coup Successful: Sheikh Saqr Al Nahyan deposed and executed; Sheikh Shakhbut Al Nahyan installed

Belligerents
(Emirate of Abu Dhabi) Abu Dhabi	(Emirate of Abu Dhabi) Al Nahyan family council Supported by: United Kingdom

Commanders and leaders
(Emirate of Abu Dhabi) Saqr Al Nahyan †	(Emirate of Abu Dhabi) Khalifa Al Nahyan (Emirate of Abu Dhabi) Muhammad bin Saqr Al-Nahyan (Emirate of Abu Dhabi) Muhammad bin Khalifa Al-Nahyan

Units involved
(Emirate of Abu Dhabi) Saqr loyalists	(Emirate of Abu Dhabi) Al Manasir tribal levee

In 1928, the Al Nahyan council of elders, led by Khalifa Al Nahyan, orchestrated a coup against his brother, the ruling emir of Abu Dhabi, Saqr Al Nahyan, who himself had taken power in a coup in 1926 and assisted in orchestrating another coup in 1922.

== Background ==
In the 1920's Abu Dhabi was rocked with a series of coups dubbed the fratricides due to an economic collapse from the pearl fields the emirate relied on being over fished and depleted. In 1922 the emir, Hamdan bin Zayed Al Nahyan was overthrown and killed by a conspiracy consisting of his three brothers, Hazza, Sultan, and Saqr, with Sultan, the most liked of the trio among the family council, taking over as emir. After Hamdan's family fled to Dubai and the plotters realized that the emirate's coffers where empty, they quickly began to plot among one another, with Saqr able to convince Hazza to help him stage a second coup in 1926 that killed Sultan and crowned Saqr.

== Plot ==
Since Saqr had personally killed Sultan with his own hands, he became disreputable among his family, and although he was able to seize power, the Al Nahyan council of elders quickly began to plot his removal. Saqr was not helped by his Wahhabi sympathies and when news broke that he was offering tributes to Saudi Arabia for political support, his remaining supporters in the family council turned against him.

Sheikh Khalifa, the older brother to Hamdan, Hazza, Sultan and Saqr, was the leading figure in the elder council that orchestrated the coup. Sultan's second-eldest son Hazza was able to form a pact against Saqr that included the Al-Bu Shaar section of the Al Manasir that included Saqr's youngest son Sheikh Muhammad. An elaborate plot was hatched that involved a Baluchi-origin servant from Sultan's remaining household staff sneaking the conspirators into a New Years day celebration on January 1, 1928 to kill Saqr and take the throne. Although Saqr was able to escape from the party, one of the conspirators, Al-Bu Shaar, was able to catch up to the fleeing Saqr and executed him.

== Aftermath and succession ==
=== New emir ===
Khalifa accepted full responsibility for the killing of his brother and banished Saqr's kids to Dubai. He installed his son Muhammad as temporary caretaker in the ruler's fort and ruled through him via a powerful contingent of Manasir. Khalifa's wife, who had discouraged him from pursuing inheriting the throne in 1909, didn't want her son's life put at risk becoming the new emir, so instead the family council began considering junior members of the Al Nahyan.

Muhammad had married his cousin, Sultan's daughter, and as such Khalifa sought to restore one of her brothers as the new emir. Khalifa met with Sultan's second-eldest son Khalid, who chose not to go into exile, but instead sought sanctuary with the council of elders and was in Abu Dhabi at the time of the coup. Khalid's brothers Shakhbut, Hazza, and Zayed where all in exile in Buraimi, under the protection of their grandfather's elderly wali: Ahmad bin Muhammad Al-Dhaheri.

The Bani Yas elders wanted Khalifa to crown Hazza, however, the British Empire, then the colonial overlords at the time, intervened in the coup and argued that stringent codified primogeniture be implemented, in order for the new ruler to both receive the British's blessing, and to end the string of palace coups. As such, the British favored Sultan's first-born son Shakhbut as the new emir. Shortly afterwards Khalifa invited Shakhbut back from exile, and his three brothers swore an oath of fidelity to their still influential mother, Salama, to support him.

=== Consequences ===
Shakhbut's rule would be far from stable. Merely a vehicle for the elder council to rule through, in 1954-1955 two of Saqr's son would be financed by Saudi Arabia to begin orchestrating their own coup, although this attempt would ultimately be foiled. When Shakhbut finally began ruling in his own right in the 1950's he took the emirate in a conservative Islamist direction, and following an economic crisis due to his refusal to invest in the oil industry, and Shakhbut's banning of any new construction, and the banning of stone buildings, the British helped his younger brother Zayed stage a coup in 1966.

== See also ==
- 1922 Dhabyani coup d'état
- 1926 Dhabyani coup d'état
- 1954-1955 Dhabyani coup attempt
- 1966 Dhabyani coup d'état
- 2011 Dhabyani coup attempt
