= 1966 Dhabyani coup d'état =

Coup in the United Arab Emirates

Coordinates: 24.28°N 54.22°E

1966 Dhabyani coup
- Emirate of Abu Dhabi in the United Arab Emirates
Date	August 6, 1966
Location	Emirate of Abu Dhabi
Result	Coup Succeeded: Sheikh Shakhbut Al Nahyan deposed; Sheikh Zayed Al Nahyan installed

Belligerents
(Emirate of Abu Dhabi) Abu Dhabi	(Emirate of Abu Dhabi) Al Nahyan council United Kingdom

Commanders and leaders
(Emirate of Abu Dhabi) Shakhbut Al Nahyan (surrendered)	(Emirate of Abu Dhabi) Zayed Al Nahyan (United Kingdom) Glencairn Balfour Paul

Units involved
(Emirate of Abu Dhabi) Shakhbut loyalists	(Trucial States) Trucial Oman Scouts (United Kingdom) Unknown British Military Formations (Note: Information on direct British involvement remains classified, however, direct use of British forces was authorized and used)

On August 6, 1966, Zayed Al Nahyan, the younger brother of ruling Sheikh of Abu Dhabi Shakhbut Al Nahyan, staged a bloodless palace coup with direct military assistance from the United Kingdom, then Abu Dhabi's colonial overlord via the Trucial States.

== Background ==
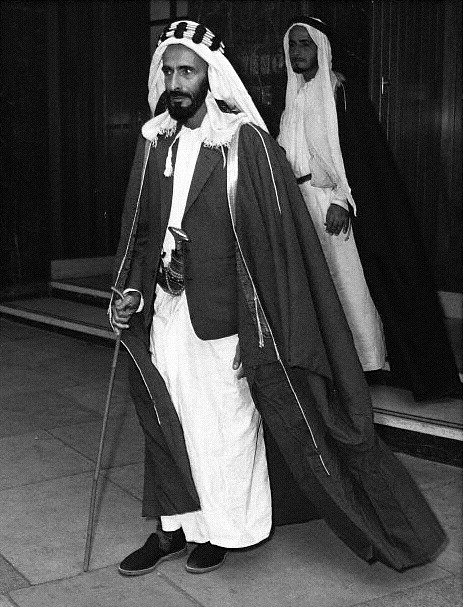
Shakhbut in 1961

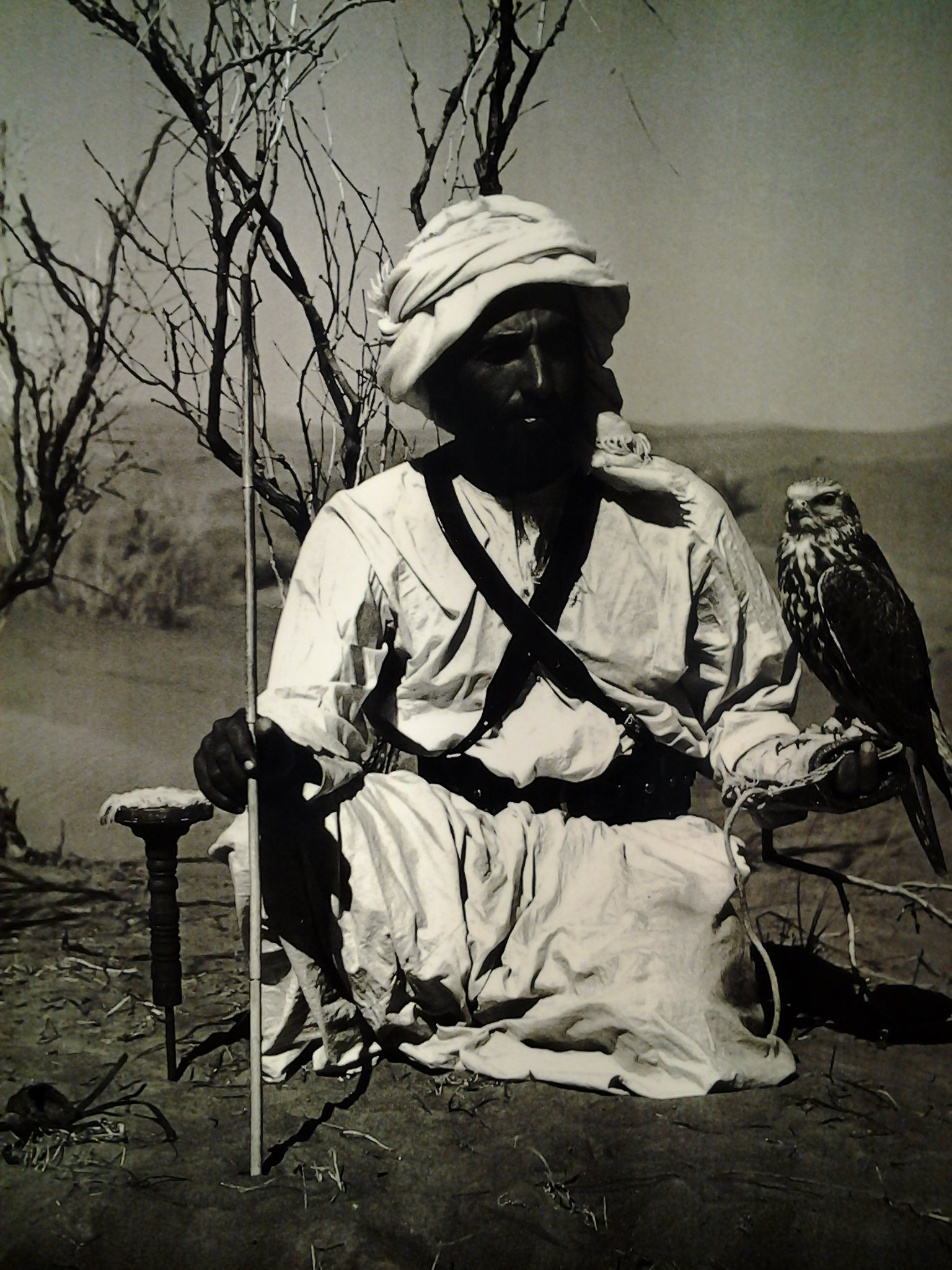
Zayed during his time as governor of Al-ain

During the 200-year rule of the Al Nahyan dynasty, the Emirate of Abu Dhabi was the scene of a series of succession conflicts, including palace coups, royal plots and assassinations. In 1928, Sheikh Shakhbut bin Sultan Al Nahyan became ruler of Abu Dhabi following a coup led by Sheikh Khalifa Al Nahyan, which killed his predecessor, Sheikh Saqr bin Zayed Al Nahyan. Saqr, in turn, had seized power through a 1926 royal plot, which resulted in the assassination of Sheikh Sultan bin Zayed Al Nahyan, Shakhbut's father.

Abu Dhabi had transformed from a collection of huts clustered around a fort to a thriving city due to the discovery of oil in the region under the leadership of Shakhbut bin Sultan Al Nahyan in the 1960s. Shakhbut had named his younger brother Zayed bin Sultan Al Nahyan as the governor of Al-Ain due to a vow their mother had made the two of them swear, following a series of fratricidal murders among their uncles. Zayed quickly made a name for himself being vehemently opposed to political Islam, noting Wahhabism and the Saudi government actively disputed territories in Al-Ain, spreading Wahhabism among locals to further their cause.

Shakhbut had resisted efforts by the British to westernize Abu Dhabi, being perceived by the British as the most tight-fisted ruler in the Persian Gulf. Shakhbut's financial mismanagement and refusal to Westernize angered British authorities who wanted to see the royal treasury, which was raised primarily off oil revenues, to be re-invested back into building more oil wells and developing more infrastructure. Concurrently, the British and their Arab allies in the rest of the Trucial States and Oman where fighting the Dhofar War against the Marxist-Leninist Popular Front for the Liberation of the Occupied Arabian Gulf, which vowed to spread Communism to the Trucial states, including Abu Dhabi, and the British saw it vital to oust older more traditionally islamist leadership in the gulf. The British also orchestrated coups in Sharjah in 1965 and Oman in 1970 to install more western-oriented and pro-business leaders. In Abu Dhabi, the British reported in 1964 that Shakhbut's autocratic rule, and an influx of Arab migrant workers potentially harboring Pan-Arab sentiments, made Abu Dhabi a "perfect target for subversive and revolutionary activity".

Protests inside Abu Dhabi began to question the governance of Shakhbut, with Zayed secretly meeting with Hugh Boustead to argue that Shakhbut was clinically insane and unfit to govern in 1964. Boustead wrote that Zayed convinced him that his brother was "basically mad". Zayed presented himself to both Boustead and his successor Archie Lamb as the opposite of Shakhbut, and wrote to British leadership in the region that despite personally pleading with his brother, Shakhbut routinely rejected calls to develop infrastructure, seemingly unaware of becoming increasingly unpopular with the general public. Zayed supported closer cooperation with the other members of the Trucial States and supported British activities to federalize the Sheikdoms into the United Arab Emirates, but Shakhbut opposed federalization and cooperation with the other Trucial States. When he was required to attend pan-Trucial talks, Shakhbut wouldn't attend in person, instead, he would send Zayed as his official representative.

== Events ==
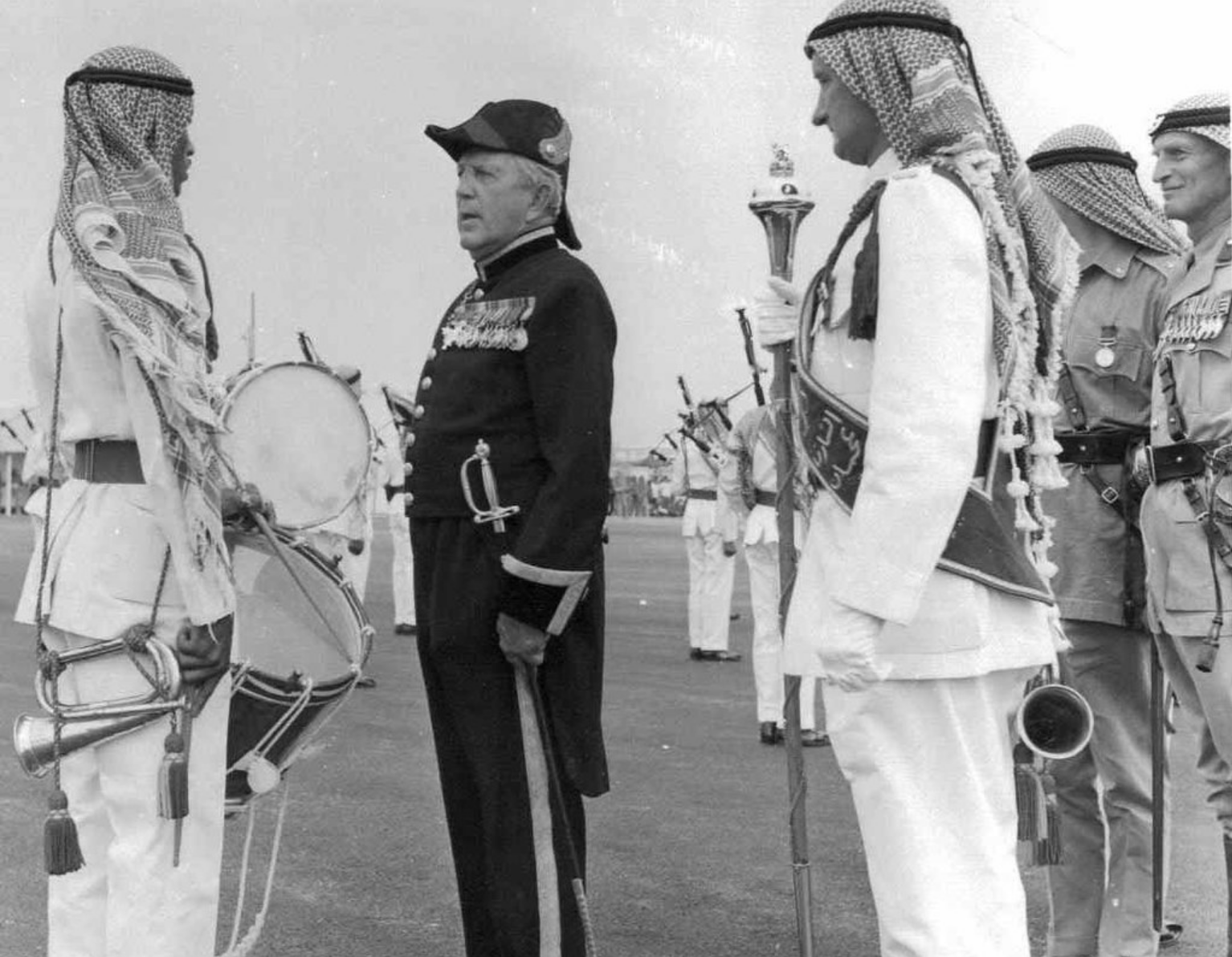
Hugh Boustead, one of the principle British organizers of the coup, during his service farewell parade in 1967

=== 1963 plan ===
Boustead and William Henry Luce had been attempting to pressure the British government into replacing Shakhbut with Zayed without Zayed's support since at least 1962. In 1963, Luce planned to hand deliver a letter to Shakhbut demanding his abdication in favor of Zayed, otherwise the British government would rescind their recognition of his government, instead recognize a rival government led by Zayed, and would use military force to maintain order via the Trucial Oman Scouts. Luce was ordered to halt his plans due to lack of confirmed support from Zayed.

The British Foreign Office routinely opposed proposals established by Boustead and Luce, arguing that their time in the Sudan Political Service had made them think of themselves as colonial administrators instead of diplomats, and that an overt coup would be seen as a colonial power-grab. The Foreign Office argued that Shakhbut's poor governance was "strictly speaking not our affair"

=== 1965 plan ===
Zayed became convinced that a coup would be needed to remove his brother following a meeting in June 1964 in attempt to explain the royal family was becoming increasingly unpopular with the public, but was met with Shakhbut dismissing his brother: "I know we are popular, and I know that they like me." With Zayed's support confirmed, the British began to plan a coup while Shakhbut was yachting with Prince Rainier of Monaco. The Trucial Oman Scouts presumably would have escorted Zayed into the capital to assume the role of Sheikh, while a Royal Navy detachment would intercept Rainier's yacht and escort Shakhbut to Qatar or Bahrain. However, as the planned date expired, no coup took place, due to concerns that direct British involvement couldn't be defended in the House of Commons.

=== 1966 Coup ===
Zayed would immediately step into power, on 6 August 1966, H. G. Balfour-Paul orchestrated a bloodless palace coup to replace Shakhbut with Zayed. Exact details on the coup remain unknown, as most documents on the coup are Classified information due to the direct involvement of the British Government. On the night of August 4, 1966, Balfour-Paul received a letter from the Foreign Office that the Al Nahyan family council would be seeking to depose Shakhbut, and were to receive British assistance. The Foreign Office notes that the letter was signed by "both required persons" to authorize direct use of British personnel, but did not specify who those were. (Note: It is assumed that then Prime Minister Harold Wilson is one of the two persons) Zayed would march on the royal palace with the backing of the Trucial Oman Scouts, and force his brother to abdicate to him. Shakhbut would then take a flight into exile in Bahrain.

Historian Helene von Bismarck concluded that Zayed and the British government were equal partners in the coup, rather than the coup being a purely British instrument to preserve power, or solely a move by Zayed to increase his own personal power.

== Aftermath ==
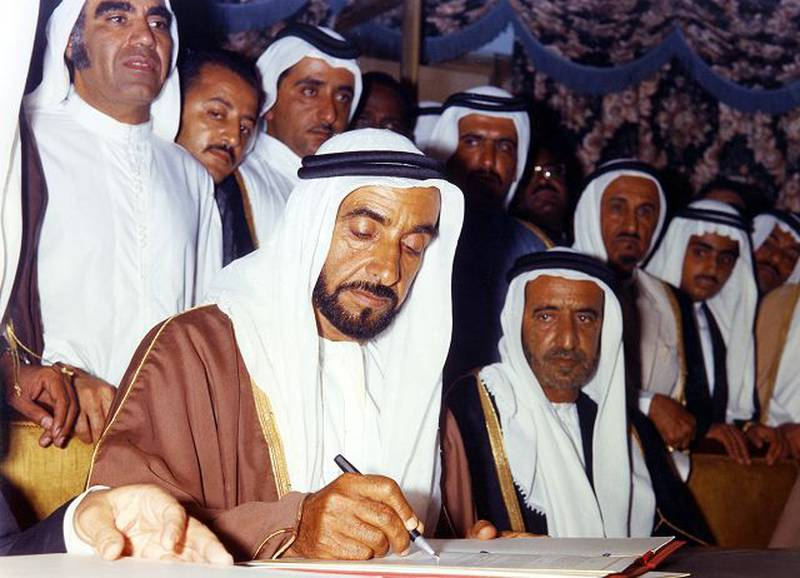
Zayed signing the federation agreement establishing the UAE

Shakhbut would go into exile but was invited back to Abu Dhabi by Zayed, fixing their relationship. The British government argued that Shakhbut was “failing to create an efficient administration, failing to govern and for not using the state’s wealth for the benefit of the people” in an official statement on the coup. Zayed promptly banked most of Abu Dhabi's wealth into the British Bank of the Middle East and rapidly developed Abu Dhabi into a modern metropolis. Zayed went on to serve as the President of the UAE.

The 1966 coup would often be compared to efforts by Sheikh Hamdan bin Zayed al-Nahyan to stage a palace coup during the Arab Spring in 2011, although the attempt would ultimately be foiled, especially due to Hamdan supposedly seeking to improve his own personal achievements following a Hajj in 2010, seeking to follow in his father's footsteps and seize power himself.

== See also ==
- 1922 Dhabyani coup d'état
- 1926 Dhabyani coup d'état
- 1928 Dhabyani coup d'état
- 1954-1955 Dhabyani coup attempt
- 2011 Dhabyani coup attempt

== Bibliography ==
- Bismarck, Helene von (2013). British Policy in the Persian Gulf, 1961-1968: Conceptions of Informal Empire. Springer. ISBN 978-1-137-32672-0.
