= Hazza bin Sultan Al Nahyan =

- Sheikh ٱلشَّيْخَ
- Born: 1905 (according to British sources)
- Died: January 20, 1958
- Spouse: Maryam bint Said bin Zayed bin Khalifa Al Nahyan; Maryam bint Hamdan bin Zayed bin Khalifa Al Nahyan
- House: Al Nahyan
- Father: Sultan bin Zayed bin Khalifa Al Nahyan
- Mother: Salama bint Butti Al-Qubaisi
- Religion: Islam

Sheikh Hazza bin Sultan Al Nahyan (Arabic: ٱلشَّيْخ هَزَّاع بِن سُلْطَان آل نَهْيَان, romanized: Ash-Shaykh Hazzāʿ bin Sulṭān Āl Nahyān) was the brother of Sheikh Shakhbut bin Sultan Al Nahyan, Ruler of Abu Dhabi from 1928 to 1966, and Sheikh Zayed bin Sultan Al Nahyan, Ruler of Abu Dhabi from 1966 to 2004 and the UAE's first President. Hazza was the Ruler's Representative in the Western Region of Abu Dhabi.

== Early years ==
Hazza was born in the period 1905-1907 in the Western Abu Dhabi village of Mujib, the second son of Sheikh Sultan bin Zayed bin Khalifa Al Nahyan and Sheikha Salama bint Butti, an influential lady from the tribe of Al-Qubaisi. Sheikh Sultan would go on to rule Abu Dhabi from 1922-1926. Shakhbut was his elder brother. Sheikh Salama, alarmed by the family history of fratricide, made all four of her sons swear not to harm each other.

He studied under the Imam of the Seer Mosque, Aqail Saber Haidar Al Khoury. In July 1926, aged 19, he traveled with his mother and brothers from Abu Dhabi to Al Ain when his father sent them away suspecting trouble. The subsequent coup saw Sheikh Sultan bin Zayed killed and the accession of Sheikh Saqr bin Zayed Al Nahyan, Hazza's uncle. Hazza's younger brother Khalid was caught up in the violence in Abu Dhabi, and wounded before seeking refuge with the Qubaisat, his mother's family.

Hazza and Shakhbut subsequently fled Al Ain and travelled in search of refuge to Sharjah, al-Hasa, Wakra, Delma, Qatar and then Riyadh. They returned to Abu Dhabi on the death of Sheikh Saqr in another coup in 1928.

== Ruler's Representative ==
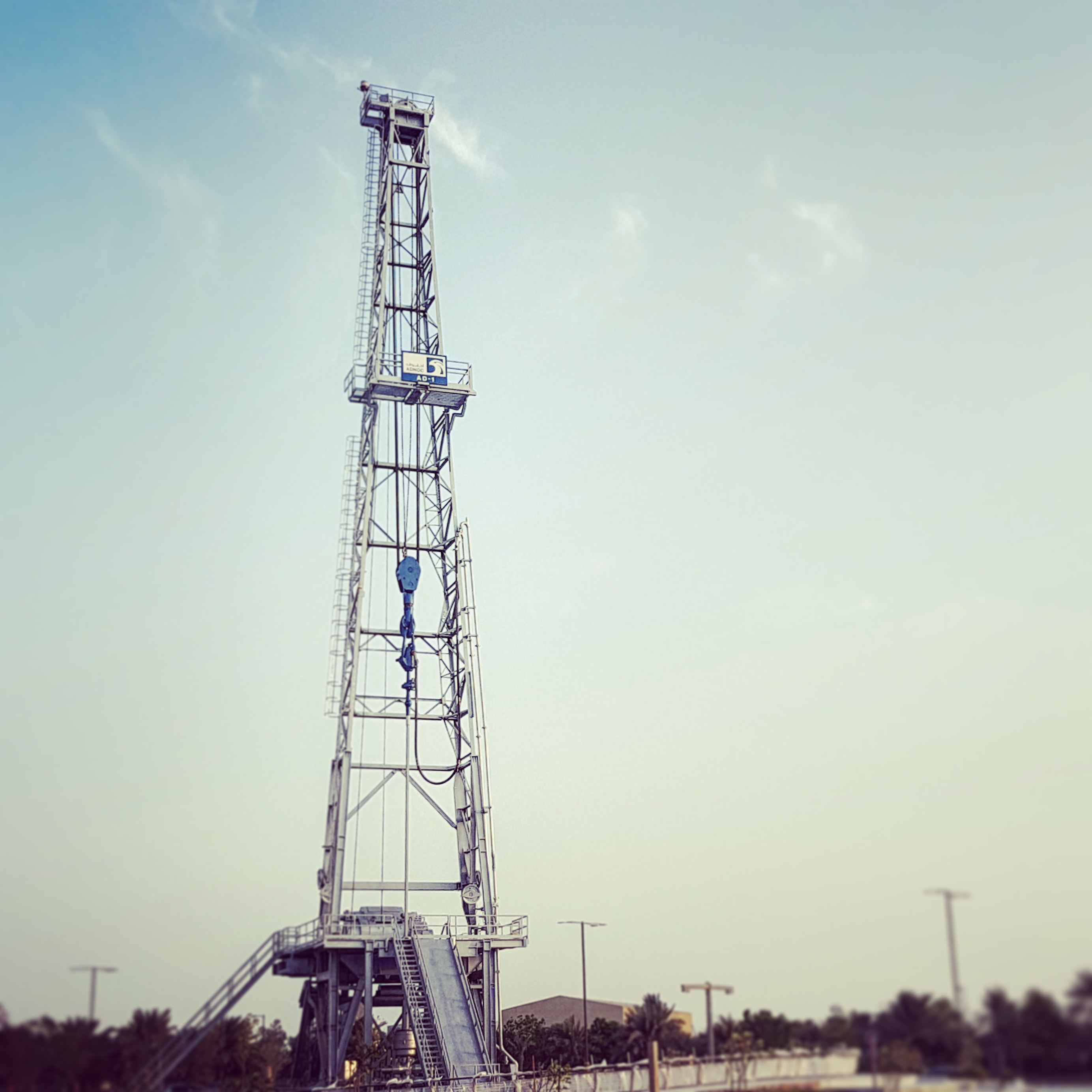
Abu Dhabi's first oil rig, AD-1. Although Sheikh Hazza attended the first 'spudding in' of a rig in Abu Dhabi, oil was not found in commercial quantities until after his death in 1958.

Sheikh Shakhbut became the next Ruler of Abu Dhabi and appointed Hazza as his wali or Representative to the Western Region. Well-versed in tribal affairs and commanding widespread respect, Hazza was keen on falconry, a love for the sport that was shared by his younger brother, Zayed, who was the Ruler's Representative in the Eastern Region.

Hazza led a mission to Saudi Arabia in 1922, representing his brother and earning a rebuke from the British as they reserved to themselves all foreign relations of the Trucial States, the result of the 'Exclusive Agreement' of 1892.

He was present at the first 'spudding in' of Abu Dhabi's first exploratory drilling at Ras Al Sadr, in February 1950. This well was eventually, however, found to be dry (the deepest ever drilled in the area at 13,000 feet) and it wasn't until October 1960 that oil was found in commercial quantities in Abu Dhabi.

Of the many tribal disputes, Hazza was to rule over, one was to have British explorer Wilfred Thesiger's Bedouin guide freed from Sharjah prison - Salim Bin Ghabaishah, a Rashidi, went raiding with the Awamir in 1950 and was captured by the Bani Qitab. Hazza's intervention was enough to secure Ghabaishah's release.

== Buraimi dispute ==
Hazza lived in the Liwa Oasis, in the village of Mariyah and his authority spanned Liwa, the Batin, Batinah, Qufa, Saruq, Ramlat Al Hamra and Bainunah. He was responsible for maintaining the peace between the (often fractious) Bedouin tribes, collecting Zakat and undertaking the application of law and maintaining the stability and security of the region. Not least of his challenges were continued encroachments on the territory under his control by the Saudi Arabian oil company, ARAMCO, and in 1949, Hazza and the British agent, P. D. Stobart, undertook a fact-finding tour of the border areas to the south of Abu Dhabi, which led to a protest being made to Saudi Arabia. These incidents formed part of a pattern of Saudi incursions which was eventually to lead to the occupation of Buraimi by an armed Saudi force, an action which sparked the Buraimi Dispute of 1952-1954. Together with Zayed, Hazza attended the Geneva Court in September 1955 on behalf of his brother, during attempts to arbitrate the Buraimi Dispute. However, the arbitration failed when the British and Belgian representatives walked out, and the British resolved to unilaterally abrogate the Standstill Agreement and themselves invade Buraimi.

== Death ==
Hazza's health was declining at the time of the Buraimi Dispute, and despite undergoing treatment in the United States and India, he died on 20 January 1958.

== Personal life ==
He was a close friend of Sheikh Rashid bin Saeed Al Maktoum, the Ruler of Dubai. He married twice, both times to a cousin from the lineage of Zayed bin Khalifa Al Nahyan, but had no children. His first wife was Sheikha Maryam bint Said bin Zayed bin Khalifa. After her death, he married Sheikha Maryam bint Hamdan bin Zayed bin Khalifa.

== Legacy ==
He has falajes named after him in the Western and Eastern Regions of Abu Dhabi, respectively Bed‘ Hazza‘ and Falaj Hazza‘.
