= Duru (tribe) =

Bedouin tribe of the United Arab Emirates

- Arab tribe
- Ethnicity: Arab
- Location: United Arab Emirates
- Language: Arabic
- Religion: Islam

The Duru (Arabic: الدرعي singular Al Darai الدروع) is a tribe of the United Arab Emirates (UAE). A relatively small tribe, they nevertheless managed to intersperse themselves in a number of territorial conflicts which broke out throughout the Trucial States in the 20th century.

== Conflict with Awamir ==
Tribal raiding in 1877 saw the Duru and Awamir acting in concert and raiding Dubai, while the northern Bani Qitab raided Abu Dhabi, before a peace was eventually arranged.

Although the Duru were on good terms with the Al Bu Shamis and considered themselves dependents of Dubai, they were in conflict with other tribes, including the Rashid and particularly the warlike Awamir, who encroached on their dar or territory. In the 1920s, in Liwa and Buraimi, fighting broke out between the Bedouin tribes, with the Manasir and Bani Yas of Dhafra fighting a southern confederation of Awamir, Duru and Al Bu Shamis. The conflict resulted in the Manasir and some Mazari seeking the protection of the headman of Hasa, Ibn Jaluwi. Sheikh Hamdan bin Zayed Al Nahyan, an ally of the Wahhabis, finally managed to broker an uneasy truce between them.

However, fighting broke out again in the Buraimi oasis, between the Duru, Manasir and Bani Qitab. The escalating conflict provided an early challenge for the new Ruler of Abu Dhabi, Sheikh Sultan bin Zayed Al Nahyan, who was at a disadvantage as an arbitrator because of Hamdan's wahhabi affiliation. Sultan marched against the Duru in December 1923. Word got out of his movement and the Duru and Awamir raised a force, together with the Bani Qitab of Falayah, which met a party of 20 riders from Abu Dhabi and killed seven of them and captured the rest. Raising a force of 200 men, the Northern confederation raided Buraimi while Sultan's forces raided Falayah. The Duru, understanding that men from Dubai had been supporting Sultan, raided Dubai in revenge.

== Saudi influence ==
A concerted effort at conciliation followed, as the various Trucial Rulers recognised that the ongoing conflicts were threatening to descend into a state of general war. The Duru, as well as the Al Bu Shamis, once again sought the protection of Ibn Jaluwi, who was only too pleased to extend his influence among the tribes of the Trucial States and Oman.

This led to an ongoing and bloody conflict and in the 1940s, fighting led the headman of the Bedouin Awamir, Salim bin Hamad bin Rakkad, to lead his people to Al Hasa in 1943. They returned in 1948, but in subsequent years were constantly drawn back to Hasa. The bulk of the tribe remained at Buraimi and petitioned the Al Bu Falah for protection. One of Sheikh Zayed bin Sultan Al Nahyan's first acts when he was appointed wali of Al Ain was to call for Salim bin Mussalam bin Hamm and appoint him as head of the Bedouin Awamir. The portion of the tribe which had moved south under Salim bin Hamad became Saudi citizens and this schism within the Awamir, driven by the Duru, was later to form part of the territorial arguments put forward in the Buraimi Dispute.
