= Salama bint Butti Al Qubaisi =

Wife of Sultan bin Zayed bin Khalifa Al Nahyan

- Sheikha الشيخة
- Born: 7th of January 1889; Liwa
- Died: October 1970; Al Ain
- Spouse: Sultan bin Zayed bin Khalifa Al Nahyan
- Issue: Shakhbut bin Sultan Al Nahyan; Khalid bin Sultan Al Nahyan; Hazza bin Sultan Al Nahyan; Zayed bin Sultan Al Nahyan; Mariam bint Sultan Al Nahyan
Names
- Salamah bint Butti Al Qubaisi (Arabic: سلامة بنت بطي القبيسي)
- House: Al Nahyan (by marriage)
- Father: Butti bin Khadem bin Nehayman Al Qubaisi
- Mother: Moza bint Hamed bin Sultan Al Falahi
- Religion: Islam

Sheikha Salama bint Butti Al Qubaisi (Arabic: ٱلشَّيْخَۃ سَلَامَة بِنْت بُطِّي القبيسي, romanized: Ash-Shaykhah Salāmah bint Buṭṭī) was the wife of Sheikh Sultan bin Zayed bin Khalifa Al Nahyan, Ruler of the Emirate of Abu Dhabi from 1922, and the mother of Sheikhs Shakhbut (who ruled Abu Dhabi from 1928 to 1966) and Zayed (who ruled Abu Dhabi from 1966 to 2004, and was the president of the United Arab Emirates from 1971 to 2004). Other children include Hazza bin Sultan, who was the Ruler's Representative of the Western Region of the Emirate, and died in 1958.

== Life and family ==
Salamah is believed to be from the family of Al Qubaisi, a prominent Bedouin tribe from Liwa, who also settled Khor Al Adaid. Salamah herself was from Mezairaa in Liwa.

After the assassination of her husband in 1926, she took Zayed from Abu Dhabi to Al Ain, and made her sons swear an oath that they would not kill or fight against each other. In early 1955, her sons Zayed, Hazza and Shakhbut, who was the Ruler of Abu Dhabi at the time, helped to arrange her to return to Abu Dhabi on board a Gulf Air plane. She is stated to have died in October 1970, while Zayed was the Ruler.

== See also ==
- Sheikha Salama Mosque, named after her
- Qasr al-Hosn, residence
