= Awamir =

Bedouin tribe of the United Arab Emirates and Oman

Awamir العوامر
- Arab tribe
- Ethnicity: Arab
- Location: United Arab Emirates; Oman
- Descended from: Amir bin Sasaa
- Population: 10,000
- Branches: Afar (not the Afar ethnic group); Bani Omar
- Language: Arabic
- Religion: Islam

The Awamir (Arabic: العوامر) (singular Al Amri Arabic: العامري) is a Bedouin Arab tribe in the United Arab Emirates (UAE) and Oman, closely associated with the Bani Yas of Abu Dhabi. Warlike and fiercely independent, they were camel breeders, raiders and occasionally date farmers before settling in the 1960s.

== History ==
Sheikh Hamid bin Rakadh al-'Amri (right) with Sheikh Ghusn bin Salim al-Maamari of the Bani Omar (left)

The Awamir roamed across the whole Oman peninsula, from Muscat and Nizwa to Abu Dhabi and Liwa. The Awamir in the area of Abu Dhabi were considered affiliated to the Bani Yas and frequently supported them in conflicts. A large tribe, the Awamir originated in the steppes to the north of the Hadhramut, settling in the north in a process of migration which took place over 500 years. A subsection of the tribe, 'Afar, was linked to Dhafrah. Some 4,000 Awamir settled outside of Oman proper at the turn of the 20th century and of the whole tribe, numbered at the time as 10,000 strong, some 3,500 were nomadic Bedouin.

J. G. Lorimer characterised the Awamir as "Reputed brave and warlike but crafty, treacherous and predatory; they are said to plunder indiscriminately all whom they meet..." Samuel Beckett Miles characterised them as 'very wild and savage'.

== Bani Yas affiliation ==
In 1848, Sheikh Saeed bin Tahnun Al Nahyan was spurred into action against the Wahhabis encamped in Buraimi, capturing his two forts back with the help of the Awamir. The Awamir formed part of the tribal confederacy force he then pulled together and used to clear the oasis and block a relieving army under Sa'ad bin Mutlaq. It was a decisive strategic victory. By 1850, Saeed's great tribal association had cleared Buraimi Oasis of Wahhabi forces. He subsequently accepted a stipend from the Sultan of Muscat for the defence of Buraimi.

The Awamir supported Saeed's successor, Sheikh Zayed bin Khalifa Al Nahyan in his extended war with Qatar in the 1880s, a series of conflicts that secured the western border of Abu Dhabi. By the 1920s, the Awamir were central to a number of conflicts between the tribes around Buraimi and Abu Dhabi town, fighting with the Manasir, Duru and Bani Qitab.

== Raiding ==
By the 1930s, the decline of pearling on the Trucial Coast had led to a general recession and the Awamir's raiding activities grew as demand for their camels and services as drivers dropped. The raids on Dubai alone were part of the general unrest (in a time of depression and poverty) felt by the people against their Ruler, Sheikh Saeed bin Maktoum Bin Hasher Al Maktoum leading to the Majlis movement. In 1931 alone several such incidents included raids on camel trains, on settlements and date groves and, in at least one case, sheer vandalism in retaliation against a ruler's punishment of them: they cut down 20 unripe date palms in Umm Al Quwain following an outbreak of looting. This raiding led to open conflict between tribes and Abu Dhabi found itself called to account on behalf of its unruly subjects as raids led to open and bloody warfare between tribes and the 1946 war between Dubai and Abu Dhabi. For the first time, the British were forced to intervene in matters of the interior and broker an agreement between Abu Dhabi and Dubai over their border and the terms of a peace between the tribes.

The Awamir had long been in conflict with the Duru and in the 1940s, the ongoing conflict led the headman of the Bedouin Awamir, Salim bin Hamad bin Rakkad, to lead his people to Al Hasa in 1943. They returned in 1948, but in subsequent years were constantly drawn back to Hasa. The bulk of the tribe remained at Buraimi and petitioned the Al Bu Falah for protection. One of Sheikh Zayed bin Sultan Al Nahyan's first acts when he was appointed Wali of Al Ain was to call for Salim bin Mussalam bin Hamm and appoint him as head of the Bedouin Awamir. The portion of the tribe which had moved south under Salim bin Hamad became Saudi citizens and this schism within the Awamir was later to form part of the territorial arguments put forward in the Buraimi Dispute.

== Settlement ==
By the 1950s, some 50 families of the Awamir had acquired date plantations in Buraimi but few settled in Liwa. Staunchly nomadic and focused on breeding and herding camels, the Awamir had no interests in the pearling beyond casual work on the boats and remained essentially nomadic. By 1968, some 1,721 members of the Awamir were identified in a census, many of whom had taken up employment with the oil companies.
