= 2011 Dhabyani coup attempt =

Coup attempt in the United Arab Emirates

Coordinates: 24.28°N 54.22°E

- Part of Arab Spring
- Emirate of Abu Dhabi in the United Arab Emirates
Date	Mid-2011
Location	Emirate of Abu Dhabi
Result	Coup Foiled: Sheikh Khalifa Al Nahyan retains power; Sheikh Hamdan Al Nahyan placed in palace-arrest

Belligerents
(Emirate of Abu Dhabi) Abu Dhabi	(Emirate of Abu Dhabi) Junior Al Nahyan; Supported by: Al Islah

Commanders and leaders
(Emirate of Abu Dhabi) Mohammed Al Nahyan (United Arab Emirates) Saif Al Nahyan	(Emirate of Abu Dhabi) Hamdan Al Nahyan

In 2015, a royal employee of the House of Nahyan gave an interview to Middle East Eye alleging that Sheikh Hamdan Al Nahyan and several junior members of the al Nahyan had attempted to orchestrate a palace coup against his brother Khalifa Al Nahyan then the Ruler of Abu Dhabi and the President of the UAE. However, the coup would be foiled by Crown Prince Mohamed bin Zayed Al Nahyan and Interior Minister Saif bin Zayed Al Nahyan.

== Event ==
The source, a British investment banker, stated that Hamdan sought to topple his brother due to a business dispute that had sidelined him from power in 2009; seeing him go from deputy prime minister, to the governor of the "flea-bitten hole" of Al Dhafra. Aware of his increasing isolation from power, Hamdan sought to retake power by force, especially after being inspired following his 2010 Hajj to increase his own personal achievements, as his father did when he staged a coup against his brother in 1966. A second source confirmed that there was indeed a coup plot, but that the al Nahyan brothers were all secretly plotting behind each other's backs out of view of the public, stating "Hamdan didn’t have a cat in hell's chance of taking power, his brothers are far too powerful."

Hamdan painted himself as the only one of the brothers that was still true to their father's vision for the UAE, and argued that wealth was being too concentrated in the country. He sought public support vowing to turn Abu Dhabi from an absolute monarchy into a constitutional one, granting universal suffrage to all Arab nationals, turning the Federal National Council into a directly elected legislature with full powers, and wanted to portray himself as his father, overseeing this democratic transition with a firm hand. However, by mid-2011 the plot had been discovered by Saif's state security apparatus as the plotters were using their personal phones and computers to organize the plot.

== Aftermath ==
Hamdan would be isolated with all his communications being carefully monitored and restricted. By September 2011 he was planning on resigning as prince so he could move into exile in Europe, however, after another lengthy communication blackout, suddenly changed his mind, with a source close to him saying that his bank accounts were seized, and he was banned from leaving the country, being placed under effective palace-arrest in Liwa. Saif took extensive steps to make sure that news of the coup plot, and subsequent arrest of its organizing royal prince, was kept hidden, with the news of the coup attempt only breaking in 2015.

== Legacy ==
Although Hamdan's royal plot would be foiled, some of the lower levels of the chain of command would continue to plot, ultimately joining forces with al-Islah, an affiliate to the Muslim Brotherhood which had 94 members charged with plotting a coup in 2013. Several of these arrested members were junior members of noble families, including Sheikh Sultan bin Kayed al-Qassemi. Christopher Davidson, a regional expert said that a burgeoning alliance between dissatisfied pro-Democracy aristocrats with the Islamist Muslim Brotherhood was so heavily cracked down upon due to a perceived risk of a wave of palace coups across the UAE, even if a nation-wide Muslim Brotherhood plot failed.

After the Arab spring and due to perceived instability by the coup attempts, the UAE began to centralize their armed forces around the President and undertake a massive increase in military spending. Additionally, the coups also pressured the UAE and other gulf monarchies to review their power structures, as part of a broader reaction to the Arab Spring.

== See also ==
- 1922 Dhabyani coup d'état
- 1926 Dhabyani coup d'état
- 1928 Dhabyani coup d'état
- 1954-1955 Dhabyani coup attempt
- 1966 Dhabyani coup d'état
