= Ghafalah =

Bedouin tribe of the United Arab Emirates and Oman

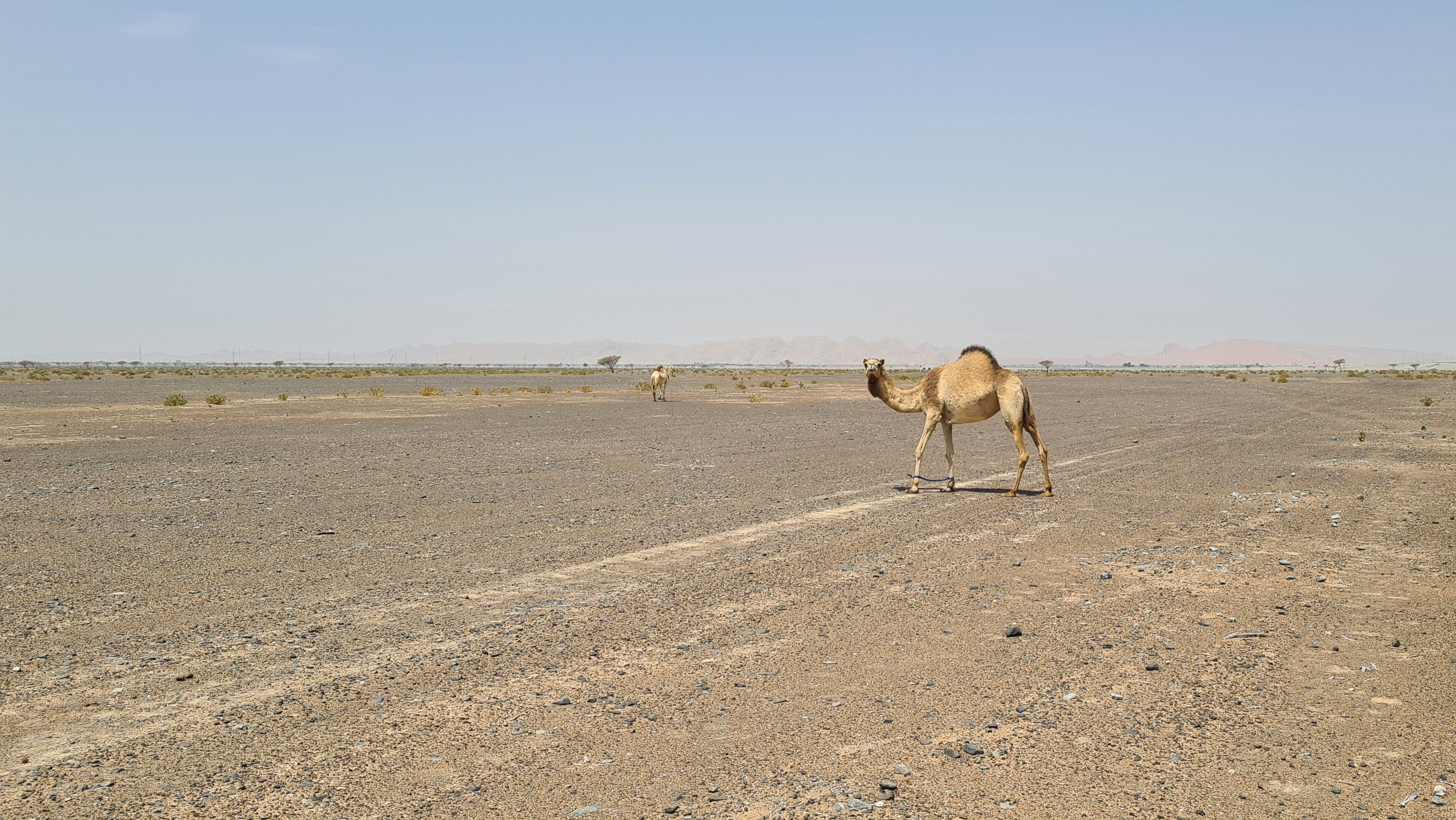
The Jiri Plain of the northern United Arab Emirates, the dar, or roaming territory, of the Ghafalah tribe.

The Ghafalah (singular Al Ghufaili) is a Bedouin Arab tribe of the United Arab Emirates (UAE) and Oman.

== Origins ==
The Ghafalah found themselves at odds with Khalifa bin Shakhbut Al Nahyan of Abu Dhabi in 1843, ten years after Khalifa's bloody succession had triggered the 1833 flight of the Al Bu Falasah to found the Maktoum town of Dubai. Egged on by Dubai's ruler, Maktoum bin Butti bin Suhail, Khalifa went to war against the Bani Qitab, Na'im and Ghafalah. His riders raided across the interior, looting the oasis town of Dhaid and taking a number of camels. The Ghafalah hit back at Maktoum in November 1843 and he attacked them in turn, putting them to flight but losing his eye in the conflict.

An entirely Bedouin tribe at the turn of the 20th century, the Ghafalah roamed the Jiri Plain inland of Ras Al Khaimah and particularly Umm Al Quwain, but did not extend their dar, or roaming territory, into the Hajar Mountains or even their foothills. At the time numbering some 500 in strength, by 1968 their numbers had dwindled to 197 people living in the five northern Emirates.

A Ghafiri tribe, the Ghafalah were close to the Al Nahyan of Abu Dhabi and often supported them in conflict. They claimed precedence over a number of wells inland, often sharing these with the Khawatir. They subsisted mainly by selling firewood and charcoal in the coastal towns, and by the produce of their 700 camels, 1,000 sheep and goats as well as cattle and donkeys. They also carried goods such as dates across inland routes to service coastal traders.

The Ghafalah were one of a number of tribes opposed to oil exploration taking place inland of the Trucial States, particularly in the late 1940s, frequently allying with the Khawatir, who frustrated the coastal Qawasim rulers in granting oil concessions and access to the interior.
