= Hamdan bin Zayed bin Khalifa Al Nahyan =

Ruler of Abu Dhabi
- Reign: 1912–1922
- Predecessor: Tahnoun bin Zayed Al Nahyan
- Successor: Sultan bin Zayed Al Nahyan
- Died: 1922
- Issue: Latifa bint Zayed Al Nahyan; Maryam bint Zayed Al Nahyan; Hamdan bin Zayed Al Nahyan
- House: Al Nahyan
- Father: Zayed bin Khalifa Al Nahyan
- Mother: Maryam bint Mohammed Al Falahi

Sheikh Hamdan bin Zayed bin Khalifa Al Nahyan was the ruler of Abu Dhabi from 1912 to 1922.

== Biography ==
Hamdan was the fifth son of Zayed bin Khalifa Al Nahyan, Ruler of Abu Dhabi. Zayed had many sons (at least seven) by several wives. His eldest son, Khalifa, declined the succession. Since Khalifa declined to accept leadership, his next brother, Tahnoun, was selected. Tahnoun ruled for three years (1909–12) and died peacefully at age 55. Tahnoun had no sons. When he died, his brother Hamdan bin Zayed (Zayed's fifth son) seized the rulership, superseding two older brothers, apart from Khalifa.

Hamdan's rule was unpopular. While Abu Dhabi's population was violently anti-Wahhabi (a number of incursions into Buraimi had helped to cement Wahhabi unpopularity), Hamdan sent a mission to Ibn Saud in Riyadh, possibly in a bid to bolster his rule by gaining external allies, but paying tribute to Ibn Saud. He is also said to have disrupted Abu Dhabi's long-standing trade relations.

Hamdan's reign witnessed the breakdown of authority which had been entrenched during his powerful father's long reign. In Liwa and Buraimi, fighting broke out between the Bedouin tribes, with the Manasir and Bani Yas fighting a southern confederation of Awamir, Duru and Al Bu Shamis. Himself becoming an ally of the Wahhabis, Hamdan managed to broker an uneasy truce.

== Assassination and aftermath ==
In August 1922, after ruling for ten years, Hamdan was killed by his younger brother, Sultan bin Zayed, who seized the throne. Zayed’s remaining two sons disagreed with the fratricide and were estranged. The murder only added to disorder within the family and the town and several family members, including Hamdan's daughters, fled to Dubai (one of them, Latifa bint Hamdan would marry Sheikh Rashid bin Saeed Al Maktoum of Dubai). Two other brothers of Hamdan and Sultan began a campaign against Sultan. Intrigue and strife were rife as factions emerged in the confusion following the murder. There were other difficulties also: Sultan inherited the unstable interior that Hamdan had barely pacified, pitching him into a series of wars and outbreaks of peace which dogged his rule.

In 1926, four years after he seized power, Sultan was killed by an older half-brother, Saqr, who then seized the throne. Saqr was the fourth son of Zayed and one of the brothers who Hamdan had superseded. Nor did it end here. Saqr himself was killed in 1928, within two years of usurping power. Many members of the family may have been involved in the plot to kill Saqr, including the eldest brother, Khalifa, who nevertheless held fast to his promise not to sit on the throne. The actual murder was carried out by members of the Manasir tribe.

It was Shakhbut, eldest son of Hamdan's assassin Sultan, who finally became ruler in 1928. Shakhbut (born in 1905) would rule Abu Dhabi from 1928 to 1966 and would be succeeded by his full brother, Zayed, who would rule from 1966 to 2004.

== Personal life ==
Hamdan married twice. One of his spouses was Shamsa bint Obaid Al Falasi from Dubai. They had a daughter named Latifa and a son named Hamdan who was born after his death. He was also married to Shamsa bint Ahmed Al Suwaidi, with whom he had a daughter, named Maryam. Latifa was taken to Dubai with her mother when her father was killed. Latifa was the mother of the rulers of Dubai, Maktoum bin Rashid Al Maktoum and Mohammed bin Rashid Al Maktoum. Hamdan's other daughter, Maryam was married to Hazza bin Sultan Al Nahyan until his death in 1958. Sheikha Maryam died in November 2020.

Hamdan bin Zayed bin Khalifa Al Nahyan House of Al Nahyan Died: 1922
Regnal titles
Preceded by Sheikh Tahnoun bin Zayed bin Khalifa	Ruler of Abu Dhabi; 1912–1922	Succeeded by Sheikh Sultan bin Zayed
