= Abu Dhabi Cultural Foundation =

The Abu Dhabi Cultural Foundation was founded in 1981 as a center of art and learning. It is located in the middle of downtown Abu Dhabi, UAE, off Khalifa Street and next to the White Fort, also known as Qasr al-Hosn Palace. The center hosts a variety of events, including art exhibits, lectures, concerts and movies, and arts workshop classes. The foundation is operated under the Abu Dhabi Authority for Culture and Heritage.
