= Zayed bin Khalifa Al Nahyan =

Sheikh of Abu Dhabi from 1855 to 1909

- Zayed The Great
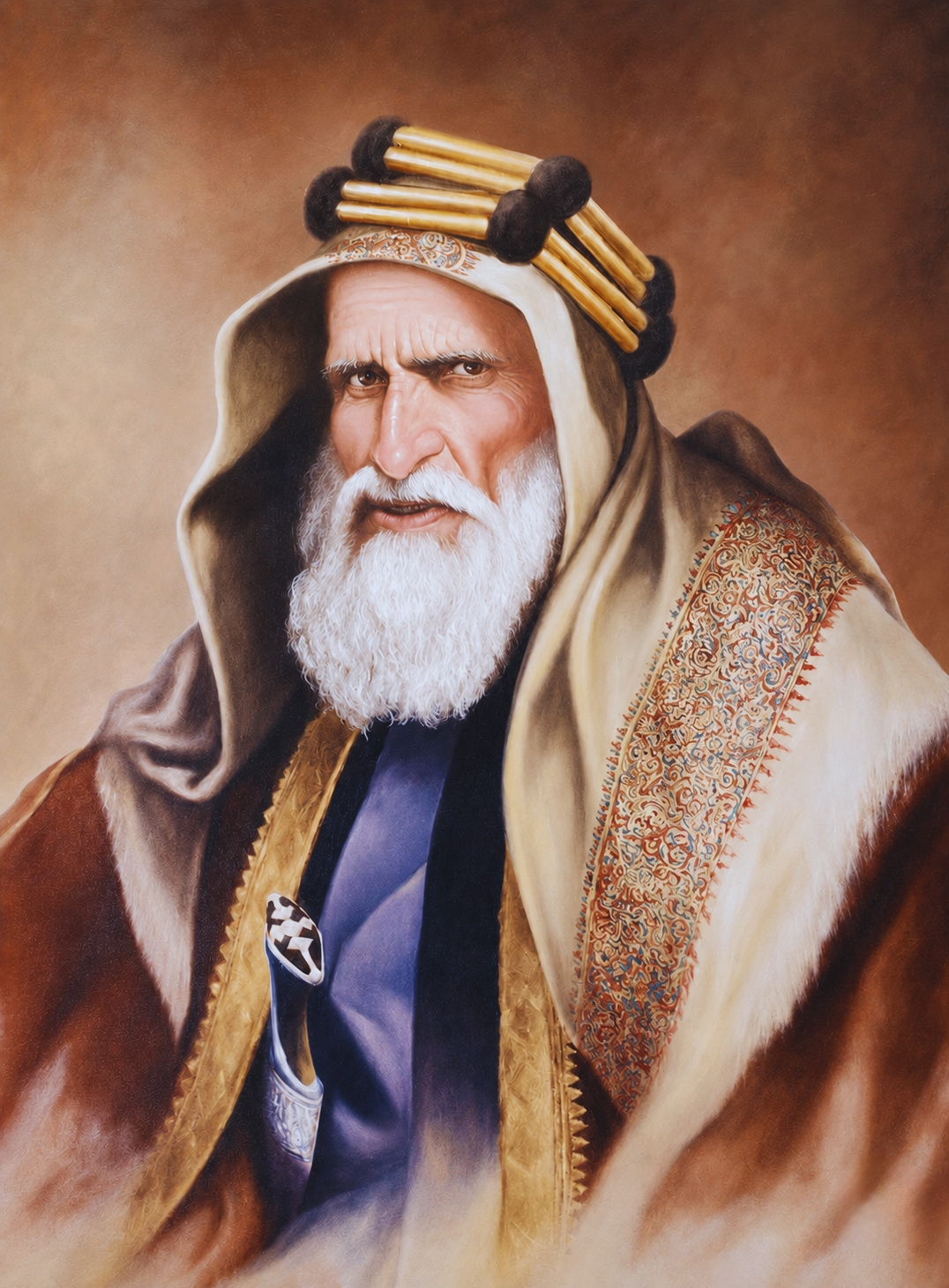
- Modern depiction of Zayed bin Khalifa

Ruler of Abu Dhabi
- Reign: 1855 – 19 May 1909
- Predecessor: Saeed bin Tahnun Al Nahyan
- Successor: Tahnoun bin Zayed bin Khalifa Al Nahyan
- Born: 1835; Abu Dhabi
- Died: May 19, 1909 (aged 73–74); Abu Dhabi
- Spouse: Maryam bint Mohammed Al Falahi; Hessa bint Rashid Al Nuaimi; Hessa bint Maktoum Al Maktoum; Latifa bint Tahnoon Al Nahyan; Maitha bint Salmeen Al Mansouri
- Issue: Khalifa bin Zayed Al Nahyan; Tahnoun bin Zayed Al Nahyan; Hamdan bin Zayed Al Nahyan; Sultan bin Zayed Al Nahyan; Saqr bin Zayed Al Nahyan; Saeed bin Zayed Al Nahyan; Hazza bin Zayed Al Nahyan; Mohammad bin Zayed Al Nahyan; Shamma bint Zayed bin Khalifa Al Nahyan
- House: Al Nahyan family
- Father: Khalifa bin Shakhbut Al Nahyan
- Mother: Moza bint Abdullah Al Suwaidi
- Religion: Islam

Sheikh Zayed bin Khalifa Al Nahyan (Arabic: زايد بن خليفة آل نهيان; 1835 – 19 May 1909), also known as Zayed the Great was the ruler of Abu Dhabi from 1855 to his death in 1909. He was the grandfather and namesake of Sheikh Zayed bin Sultan, founding father of the United Arab Emirates.

== Accession ==
Zayed bin Khalifa was born in the emirate of Abu Dhabi sometime around 1835 or 1840. He lived much of his early life with the Bedouin of Abu Dhabi. He was made Ruler of Abu Dhabi after the deposition of his cousin, Sheikh Saeed bin Tahnun, in 1855. He ruled for 54 years, until his death in 1909. He had a wife called Maitha Almansoori.

Zayed's first experience of dealing with the British came immediately following his accession when, in 1855, he was held responsible for an attack on a Bahraini boat and the murder of one of the Bahraini sailors by two Abu Dhabi vessels at Khor Udeid. The incident had actually taken place under Saeed bin Tahnun's rule and so Zayed initially refused liability but was eventually forced to pay 600 Thalers blood money and burn the two boats in punishment.

The deposed Sheikh Saeed bin Tahnun attempted a return to power in July 1856, when he sailed with a force of three boats from exile on Kish Island to Sharjah and then to land at Abu Dhabi, where he collected a number of Bedouin allies and sacked Abu Dhabi. Zayed bin Khalifa was in remote Al Dhafra to the west of Abu Dhabi at the time and it was his brother Dhiyab who barricaded the townspeople in the Qasr Al Hosn Fort against the raiders. Zayed returned from Dhafra and fought Saeed's forces at Maqta, routing them and killing both Saeed bin Tahnun and his brother Hamdan. Sharjah was found by the British to be complicit in the attempted coup and Sultan bin Saqr Al Qasimi was made to pay a fine of 25,000 Thalers (a huge sum at the time), which took four years to pay.

== Conflict and consolidation ==
In October 1867, the ruler of Bahrain, Muhammad bin Khalifa Al Khalifa, was facing open rebellion from his Qatari subjects (an 1851 peace agreement between Bahrain and Saudi Arabia had ceded Qatar to Bahrain and Dammam to the Saudis) and called on Zayed bin Khalifa for his help. Zayed embarked 2,000 men in a fleet of 80 boats in support and they attacked Doha and Wakra in October 1867, effectively demolishing both towns and scattering their populations. The action was a breach of the Maritime Truce (and arguably only took place in the temporary vacuum left by the reform of the Bombay Marine) and the British imposed large fines on Bahrain (effectively deposing Muhammad bin Khalifa) and also Zayed, who had been indemnified against any British reparation by Bahrain. The British also confiscated three cannons from Zayed, although these were returned when it was clear their loss left Abu Dhabi defenceless.

Early in his rule, Zayed guided Abu Dhabi through a series of conflicts with the Emirate of Sharjah. In 1868, during an armed clash with Sharjah's forces, he advanced ahead of his troops and challenged the Ruler of Sharjah, Sheikh Khalid bin Sultan Al Qasimi, to single combat. Zayed wounded Khalid mortally and the death of Khalid brought an end to the conflict – although outbreaks of internecine conflict continued to be the norm among the coastal communities.

=== Oman and Qatar ===
He united with Omani forces to drive the Saudi troops from the Buraimi area in 1870. This left the forts defending the Buraimi Oasis in permanent control of Abu Dhabi and forced the Saudis to abandon their designs on Oman. Abu Dhabi's influence and control over this area steadily grew afterwards. Zayed supported the Omani Imam Azzan bin Qais, who paid Abu Dhabi to defend Buraimi, against the Sultan of Muscat, Turki bin Said, at the Battle of Dhank. That battle saw Abu Dhabi allied with men from Dubai, Ajman and Ras Al Khaimah, as well as Na'im and Bani Qitab Bedouin take to the field against Turki bin Said's forces. Prevailing, Turki became the ruler, the first time in centuries, of all of Oman (both Muscat and the interior). It was a rare setback for Zayed, who continued to press for increased influence in the area, attacking the Na'im at Dhank in 1875 with a mounted force of 200 Manasir and Bani Hajir Bedouin, as well as sending a force of Manasir and Mazari against Buraimi, an act which led to the Bani Qitab applying to Dubai for help and resulting in a standoff.

Zayed led Abu Dhabi in an extended war with Qatar in the 1880s that secured the western border of Abu Dhabi. The first conflicts between the two occurred in 1881, during the battles of Baynunah, Suwaihan and Al-Marsaf. In 1887, Jassim bin Mohammed Al Thani, accompanied by Ottoman troops, led an expedition into Khor Al Adaid in southern Qatar to assert his claim over the territory, which was disputed with Zayed bin Khalifa. This action elicited strong British diplomatic protests to the Ottoman Porte, with the British Political Resident, Edward Ross, going so far as to threaten military intervention.

Tensions peaked in 1888 following a series of raids and counter-raids. Following several of these skirmishes was the Battle of Khannour from January to February 1889, in which Jassim's forces penetrated deep into Abu Dhabi territory. The conflict was eventually resolved in 1893 through an agreement jointly brokered by the British and Ottomans.

== Building influence ==
Zayed continued to spread his influence in Buraimi, buying up any property that became available in the oasis, eventually resulting in a rebellion of the previously loyal Dhawahir when they realised the extent to which he had expanded his control over oases they traditionally domainted. Zayed reconciled with the Na’im, who had long fought the Bani Yas and, with that alliance behind him, marched against Buraimi in May 1887. The Sultan of Muscat sent arms and money in support of the Dhawahir, but they arrived too late: Zayed overtook the oasis and took two of the tribe's sheikhs as hostages. He was to march against the Dhawahir once again in 1891, this time backed by 30 horsemen and 300 camel riders from Dubai. Zayed took the 'Ain Dhawahir and constructed a fort there to consolidate his dominance over the oasis. He then appointed a Wali, Ahmad bin Muhammad bin Hilal Al Dhahiri and married the daughter of the Nuaimi headman of Buraimi.

In 1895, Zayed saw in Al Zorah (today part of Ajman) an ideal base for supplying Bani Qitab forces loyal to him in conflicts with the Northern Sheikhs and applied to the British Resident for permission to move supplies there by sea. Unaware of the true reasons for the movement, the Resident gave permission but Zayed faced opposition in his scheme from other Sheikhs and was unable to complete the movement. In 1897, a section of the Sudan (singular Al Suwaidi) tribe under Sultan bin Nasser Al Suwaidi requested permission to settle Al Zorah with the support of Zayed (himself a Suwaidi on his mother's side and married to one of Sultan's daughters) and this was granted by the Resident.

Alarmed by the scheme, the Ruler of Ajman built a fort at one of the waterways connecting Al Zorah with the mainland (it was at the time an island) and the Ruler of Sharjah, in 1890, appealed to the Resident to prevent this establishment of a non-Al Qasimi stronghold in the midst of his territory. This being upheld, to the annoyance of Zayed who had seen Al Zorah as an extension of his claim to the Northern coast, the scheme was abandoned and the decision to block it was subsequently upheld after a visit to Al Zorah by Major Percy Cox, the British Political Resident.

Zayed was noted by Cox to be "troublesome" and guided the rest of the Sheikhs of Dubai and Umm Al Quwain to not adopt the White Pierced Red flag, the intended flag of the Trucial States, referencing that the flag represents the Al Qawasim tribal federation. In 1892, Zayed signed a treaty with the United Kingdom which effectively ceded control of Abu Dhabi's international commercial relations to the British.

=== Tribal alliances ===
By 1894, Zayed was considered the most powerful of the Trucial Sheikhs, replacing the hegemony of Sharjah. By 1900, he controlled a large swathe of territory, from Khor Udeid on the Qatari peninsula to Liwa and Buraimi and north to Jebel Ali. His tribal federation was solid and his rule and judgement, even among the tribes of the interior, was accepted and recognised.

Under Zayed's leadership, the first meeting between the five Trucial Sheikhs took place in Dubai, in September 1905, with the aim of settling a dispute between the Bani Qitab and Na'im. The Bani Qitab sought support from the young ruler of Umm Al Quwain, Rashid bin Ahmad Al Mualla, who was keen to expand his influence among the tribes. In April 1906, a second meeting between the five rulers was held at Khawaneej and a treaty agreed, allocating responsibility for the tribes to the two Rulers – Rashid bin Ahmad was to be responsible for the Bani Qitab, Ghafalah and Bani Ka’ab, while Zayed undertook responsibility for the Na’im of Buraimi, the Dhawahir, the Sharqiyin of Fujairah and the Shihuh of Ras Al Khaimah. The treaty gave Zayed control over a large area that had previously fallen under the influence of Sharjah, but it also gave him impetus to act against his young would-be rival and in November 1906, Zayed allied with Dubai and Sharjah and prepared to attack Falaj Al Mualla, Umm Al Quwain's inland town. The British now became involved, brokering a series of negotiations between Zayed and Rashid bin Ahmad. In January 1907, Zayed apprehended Rashid bin Ahmed and, together with the Rulers of Dubai, Ajman and Sharjah, conspired to have Rashid imprisoned. The British resident Percy Cox now became involved in a reconciliation and Rashid bin Ahmed, having been roughed up in the interim (and cured of his dynastic ambitions), was handed over to Cox.

Zayed the Great died on 19 May 1909.

== Marriage and Children ==
Zayed bin Khalifa married five times and had eight sons and one daughter. His wives and children are:

- Maryam bint Mohammed bin Saif bin Zayed Al Falahi
  - Saeed bin Zayed bin Khalifa Al Nahyan
  - Hazza bin Zayed bin Khalifa Al Nahyan
  - Hamdan bin Zayed bin Khalifa Al Nahyan
  - Sultan bin Zayed bin Khalifa Al Nahyan
  - Shamma bint Zayed bin Khalifa Al Nahyan
- Hessa bint Rashid bin Abdulaziz bin Humaid Al Nuaimi
  - Mohammed bin Zayed bin Khalifa Al Nahyan
- Hessa bint Maktoum bin Hasher Al Maktoum
  - Saqr bin Zayed bin Khalifa Al Nahyan
- Latifa bint Tahnun bin Shakhbut Al Nahyan
  - Tahnoun bin Zayed bin Khalifa Al Nahyan
- Maitha bint Salmeen Bourhama Al Mansouri
  - Khalifa bin Zayed bin Khalifa Al Nahyan

== See also ==
- Al Jahili Fort

== Sources ==
Zayed bin Khalifa Al Nahyan House of Al Nahyan Born: 1840 Died: 19 May 1909
Regnal titles
Preceded by Sheikh Said	Ruler of Abu Dhabi; 1855–1909	Succeeded by Sheikh Tahnun II
