= Tahnoun bin Zayed bin Khalifa Al Nahyan =

Emir of Abu Dhabi
- Reign: May 1909 to October 1912
- Predecessor: Zayed bin Khalifa Al Nahyan
- Successor: Sheikh Hamdan bin Zayed bin Khalifa Al Nahyan
- Born: 1857
- Died: October 1912 (aged 54–55)
- House: Al Nahyan
- Father: Zayed bin Khalifa Al Nahyan

Sheikh Tahnoun bin Zayed bin Khalifa Al Nahyan (1857–1912) was the Ruler of Abu Dhabi from May 1909 to October 1912.

== Biography ==
Tahnoun was born in 1857 and was the second eldest son of Zayed bin Khalifa. Tahnoun's mother was the daughter of Saeed bin Tahnun Al Nahyan.

Tahnoun succeeded his father Zayed bin Khalifa in May 1909 when his elder brother, Khalifa, refused to replace his father. Tahnoun died in October 1912 and was succeeded by another brother, Hamdan.

Tahnoun bin Zayed bin Khalifa Al Nahyan House of Al Nahyan Born: 1857
Regnal titles
Preceded by Zayed bin Khalifa	Ruler of Abu Dhabi; 1909–1912	Succeeded by Sheikh Hamdan bin Zayed bin Khalifa Al Nahyan
