= Manasir (tribe) =

Bedouin tribe of the United Arab Emirates

Al Manasir
- Arab tribe
- Ethnicity: Arab
- Location: United Arab Emirates (Abu Dhabi · Dubai · Sharjah); Qatar; Saudi Arabia; Bahrain
- Descended from: Mansur bin Qais
- Branches: Al Bu Mundir, Al Bu Rahamah, Al Bu Shaar
- Religion: Islam
- Surnames: Al-Mansoori

The Manasir (Arabic: المناصير, romanized: al-Manāṣīr, singular Mansuri) is a tribe of the United Arab Emirates (UAE), long closely associated with Abu Dhabi's ruling Bani Yas.

Nomadic, warlike and fiercely independent, the Manasir roamed between Buraimi and Qatar, the Persian Gulf coast to Liwa and also settled in the Northern emirates. They subsisted through date farming, pearling and moving goods with their camel trains, as well as camel breeding.

== Independent Bedouin ==
One of the most important tribes in the emirate of Abu Dhabi (together with the Bani Yas, with whom they cooperated and coexisted closely), the tribe was traditionally predominant in the desert areas between Buraimi and Qatar and the Persian Gulf coast to Liwa, but Manasir families had settled Abu Dhabi, Buraimi, Al Khan and Jumeirah by the turn of the 20th century. Apart from the settled population in the towns, the Manasir were entirely nomadic Bedouin, while the tribe they shared this region with, the Bani Yas, was largely settled. There were also a number of nomadic Marar families in the Liwa region.

Manasir houses in the Liwa Crescent were mostly seasonal areesh, or palm frond constructions, maintained as dwellings during the summer date season.

Some 1,400 Manasir roamed this tribal area or dar at the turn of the century, but surveys in the 1950s point to a total population of some 4,000: 2,800 of these lived in the emirate of Abu Dhabi while the balance lived both settled and nomadic lives in the other Trucial States.

The Manasir were fiercely independent and, unlike their settled counterparts the Bani Yas, did not necessarily consider themselves dependents of the Sheikh of Abu Dhabi. They did co-operate closely with the Bani Yas, however, and of 42 settlements in the Liwa area, Manasir were found in 36. They were an inland people with limited maritime resources and had few boats of their own. They worked the pearl banks with the Bani Yas, or worked as divers or haulers for various nakhudas. During the date season, Manasir who did not own their own plantations would work on settled plantations for payment in kind. The Manasir were exempted from paying the customary date tax to the Ruler of Abu Dhabi.

== Decline in revenues ==
Subsections of the tribe include the Al Bu Mundir (Kaabara, Mani, Marashid, Matawaah, Midahima); Al Bu Rahamah (Al Bu Khail, Tarsif, Tararifah and Wabran) and the Al Bu Shaar (Ghawainam, Rashaiyid and Al Bu Thuwaibit), and Al Rabeea. All of these wintered to the North West (by the border with Qatar) and summered in Liwa, although the Al Bu Khail section of the Al Bu Rahamah wintered in Semeih and Abu Dhabi and summered in Buraimi.

Formerly subject to the Wahhabi government, they had asserted their independence by the turn of the 20th century and were closer to Abu Dhabi, but remained essentially independent, with their own sheikhs.

The Manasir bred camels and also carried trade goods from the oases to Abu Dhabi. They made their own charcoal and would carry this, dates, limes, wheat and other produce from the oases to the towns. The annual seasonal migration of families from Abu Dhabi took place to the oases of the interior (both Al Ain, then known as Buraimi and Liwa) for the hot summer months and the date season – and the Manasir would be hired to provide the camel trains.

As the revenues of the pearl trade declined in the late 1920s, the Manasir's trade in breeding and hiring camels for the carrying trade suffered and an increase in Manasir raids on the communities of the Northern emirates resulted. This led to the respective rulers of Abu Dhabi being pressed for reparations by other Trucial Sheikhs as their own dependents took their claims to the majlis to be settled.

=== Alternative sources of revenue ===
An alternative source of revenue for the Manasir was working for the oil companies: ARAMCO or Qatar Petroleum (today QatarEnergy). Petroleum Development (Trucial Coast) Ltd had 40 Manasir on its payroll, but they only took work for as long as it took to pay off their immediate economic need, a date garden or perhaps a new wife. Latterly, it would be a Land Rover. Their animals would be left with a relative while they took up this temporary work. As this pattern of working for oil companies turned into longer term employment, and the Buraimi Dispute began to show how tribal affiliations could turn into territorial claims, the government of Abu Dhabi started to regulate this movement of labour and Manasir who stayed away longer than a year were liable to find their date plantations confiscated.

Another source of revenue as the march of civilisation forced changes to their way of life was to work as a retainer for the Ruler of Abu Dhabi. The Sheikhs of Abu Dhabi in their turn recognised that the Manasir was a potent and influential force and ensured that employment opportunities were open and subsidies paid to the Sheikhs of the Manasir. In the 1950s, the Ruler of Abu Dhabi had 85 regularly paid Manasir retainers.

== Conflicts ==
The Manasir frequently formed an important part of Abu Dhabi's fighting force, and always fought alongside the Bani Yas, although in 1823 were involved in an abortive attempt to usurp Tahnun bin Shakhbut Al Nahyan by his brother Mohammed bin Shakhbut.

In 1834, a force of Manasir attacked Sharjah during the pearling season, part of an ongoing dispute between the Bani Yas and Qawasim as a result of the foundation of Dubai as a Maktoum-led town in 1833. As a result of that raid, Sultan bin Saqr Al Qasimi seized ten boats of Abu Dhabi's pearling fleet, together with their crews and 4,000 rupees worth of pearls, causing the recall of the coastal pearling fleets and a foreclosure of that year's season.

When Sheikh Saeed bin Tahnun Al Nahyan repelled the Wahhabis from the Buraimi Oasis in 1848 with most of his forces consisting of the Awamir tribe, it was the Manasir, together with the Mazari, who waited South of Abu Dhabi to fall on the relieving force send from Nejd under Saad bin Mutlaq. The Manasir also played a key role fighting for Zayed the Great in the 1870 Battle of Dhank (which established the primacy of Turki bin Said as Sultan of Muscat) and in the period following that battle, culminating in January 1875 in a further attack by Zayed against Dhank and the area south of the town, the Dhahirah, by a mounted force of 200 Manasir and Bani Hajir Bedouins. At the same time, Zayed sent a force of Manasir and Mazari against Buraimi, an act which led to the Bani Qitab applying to Dubai for assistance and a force of riders being sent from Dubai to Buraimi. This resulted in a standoff and Zayed suspended his operations against the oasis.

The Manasir were also to be involved in fighting in Shinas in 1850, part of a 400-strong force sent by Saeed bin Tahnun Al Nahyan to support the Sultan of Muscat against an Al Qasimi attack on the town.

The Manasir were fighting again in Buraimi in 1923, when they fought against the Duru, Bani Qitab and Awamir in Buraimi – a conflict that was to lead to a long period of inter-tribal skirmishing and raiding throughout the interior.

However, they were also a force to be reckoned with and willing to play king-maker: in 1927, Sheikh Sultan bin Saqr Al Qasimi, the Ruler of Sharjah, expelled the former Ruler, Sheikh Khalid bin Ahmad Al Qasimi, with the help of the Manasir following an attempted come-back by the latter - and again in 1928 when Sheikh Saqr bin Zayed Al Nahyan was shot and killed during a coup carried out by Baluchis and Manasir, paving the way for the rule of Sheikh Shakbut bin Sultan Al Nahyan. They would play a key role in the widespread raiding throughout the interior that broke out in the 1946 conflict between Abu Dhabi and Dubai, continuing to raid and threaten Dubai as late as 1950. At least in part, these ongoing depredations were caused by the Manasir being increasingly sidelined by the march of modernisation.

== Notable members ==
- Mariam Al Mansouri – The first female fighter pilot of the United Arab Emirates
- Hazza Al Mansouri – The first Emirati astronaut in space
- Reem al-Mansoori – is a Qatari civil servant and politician. In 2017 she was one of four women appointed to the Consultative Assembly, becoming one of the country's first female parliamentarians.
- Sultan bin Saeed Al Mansoori – is an Emiratiengineer who was the Minister of the Economy of the United Arab Emirates from 2008 until 2020.
- Hawaa Al Mansoori – is an Emirati physician, inventor and politician. She was appointed to the Federal National Council of the United Arab Emirates in 2019.
- Abdullah al-Mansoori – is a Bahraini naval officer. He held several senior command positions, including Commander Royal Bahrain Naval Force, Commander Combined Task Force 152, and Commander Flotilla. Al-Mansoori also has a PhD in international relations and was awarded the Legion of Merit. He is currently the head of the national defence college of Bahrain.
- Mohammed Juma Al Mansoori - Emirati international professional football player
