= Qasr Al Hosn =

Qasr Al Hosn قَصْر ٱلْحُصْن
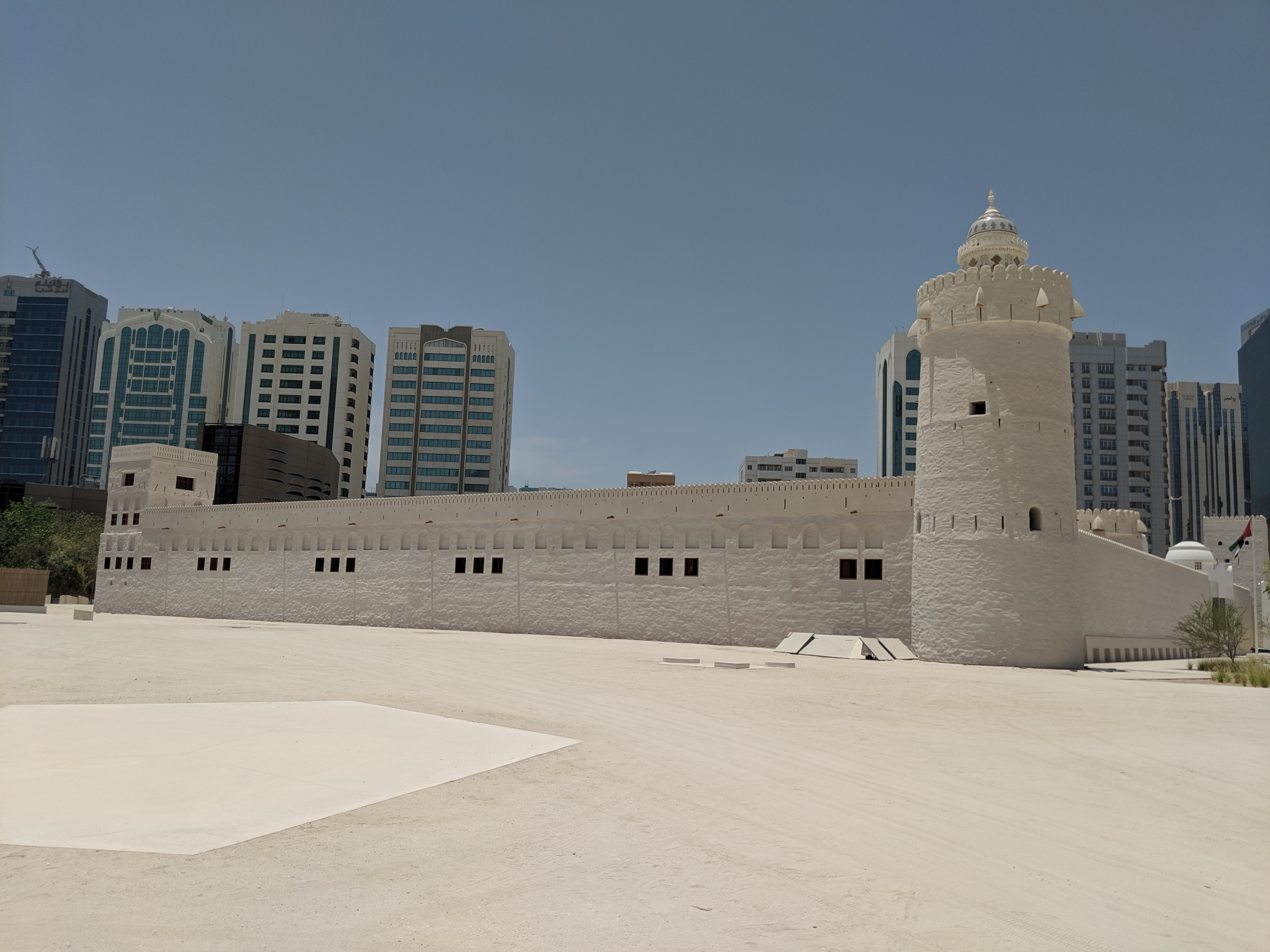
- Qasr Al Hosn in May 2019

- Location in the U.A.E. Qasr Al Hosn (Persian Gulf) Qasr Al Hosn (West and Central Asia)
- 24°28′56.6″N 54°21′17.35″E
- Location: Sheikh Zayed the First Street

History
- Built: 1931 outer Fort with 30 m (98 ft) high main watchtower around the 1761 inner fort

The Qasr Al Hosn (Arabic: قَصْر ٱلْحُصْن, romanized: Qaṣr al-Ḥuṣn, lit. 'The Fortified Palace') is a historical landmark and the oldest stone building in the city of Abu Dhabi, the capital of the United Arab Emirates. Its construction was supervised by Mohammed Al Bastaki in 1761.

== Location ==
It is located along Rashid Bin Saeed Al Maktoum St and is a part of the Abu Dhabi Cultural Foundation.

== History ==
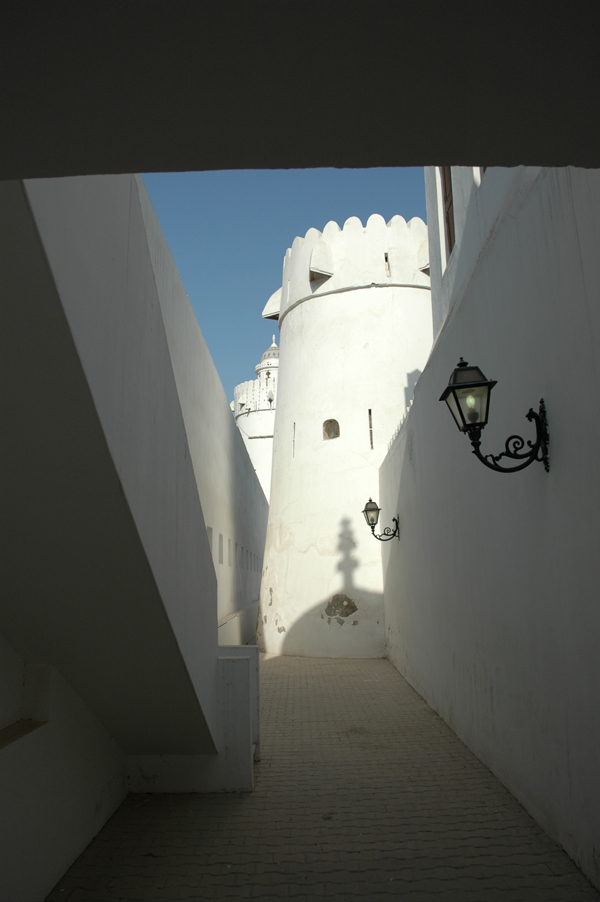
Interior of the palace

Qasr Al Hosn, also known as the White Fort (originally not white in colour but painted bright white during 1976–1983 renovations) or Old Fort, was constructed in 1761 as a conical watchtower to defend the only freshwater well in Abu Dhabi island. The tower was later expanded into a small fort in 1793 by the then ruler, Shakhbut bin Dhiyab Al Nahyan, and became the permanent residence of the ruling Sheikh. The tower took its present shape after a major extension in the late 1930s, aided by revenues received for granting the first oil license in Abu Dhabi. It remained the emir's palace (hence the name Qasr Al Hosn, meaning Palace fort) and seat of government until 1966. The fort had been refurbished several times and is now partially open to the public.

== Current use ==
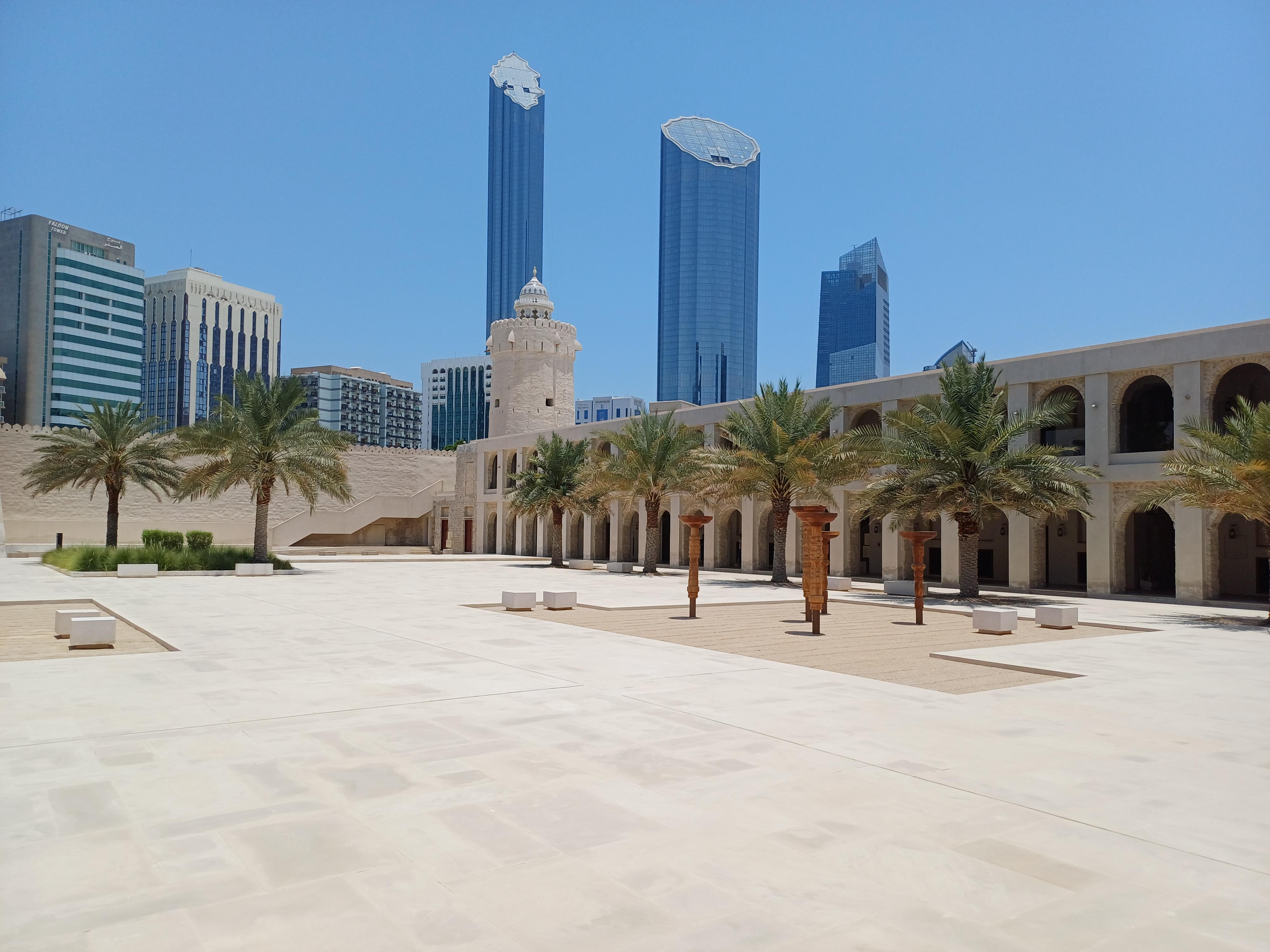
In 2024

The Qasr Al Hosn is currently the subject of extensive historical, archaeological, and architectural research. The fort houses a museum displaying artifacts and pictures representing the history of the country. It also has a range of weapons, used through the region's history, on display. Following a decade-long conservation and restoration project, Qasr Al Hosn reopened to the public in 2018 as a museum and cultural site. The wider Al Hosn complex includes Qasr Al Hosn Fort, the National Consultative Council, the Cultural Foundation, and the House of Artisans. The House of Artisans presents traditional Emirati crafts and offers educational workshops and events, including demonstrations of Sadu, Khoos, and Talli.

Qasr Al Hosn Festival is an annual 11-day cultural event staged on the grounds of the fort. The fort is open to the public during the festival, including some of the restricted areas and features live music and dance performances showing the UAE's cultural heritage.

== Mosque ==
Located on Zayed the First Street nearby (24°28′52.52″N 54°21′31.36″E) is the historical Zayed the Second Mosque (Arabic: مَسْجِد ٱلشَّيْخ زَايِد ٱلثَّانِي, romanized: Masjid Aš-Šaykh Zāyid Ath-Thānī), which should not be confused with the Grand Mosque.

== Gallery ==
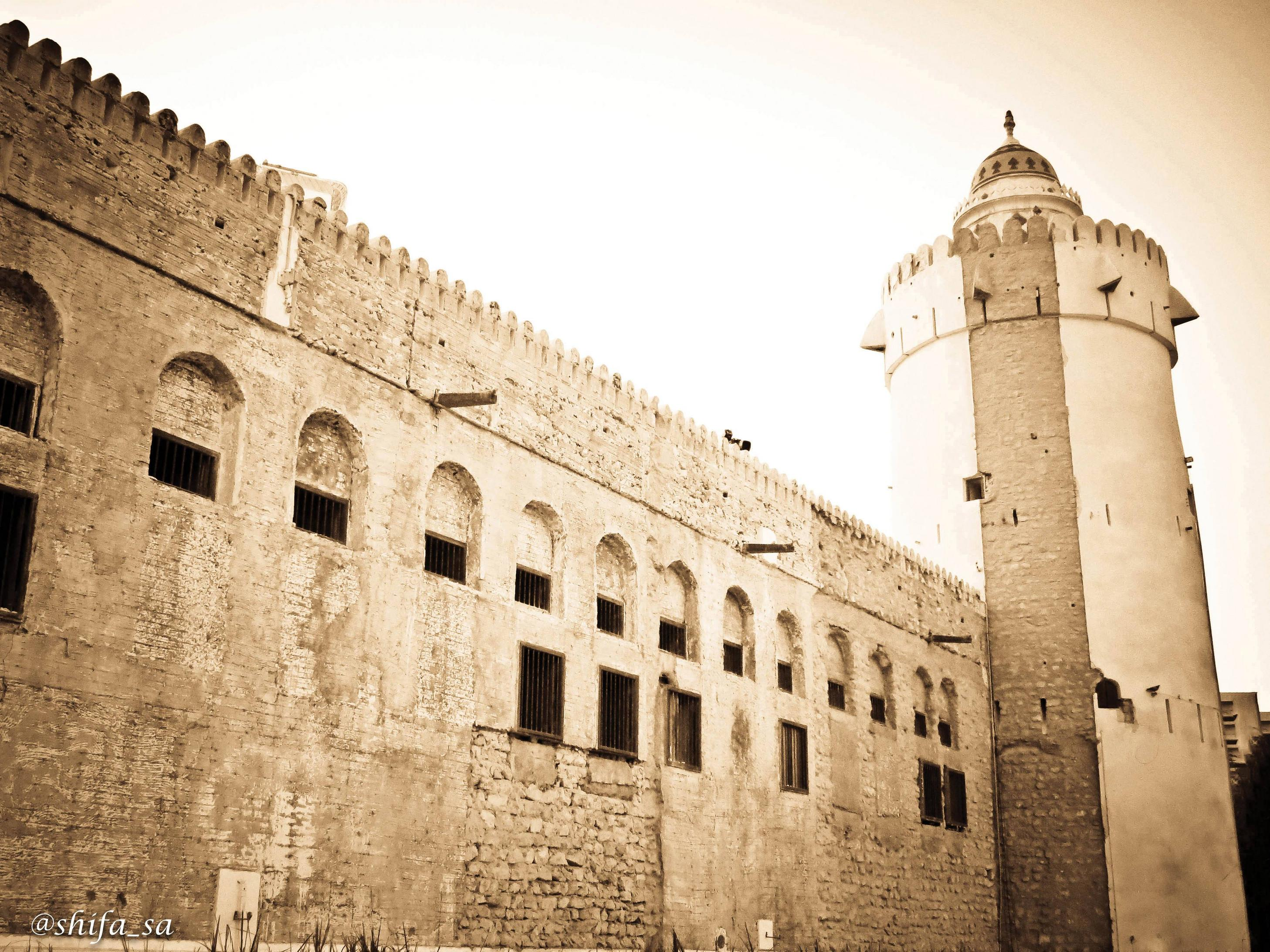
Historic exterior view of Qasr Al Hosn.

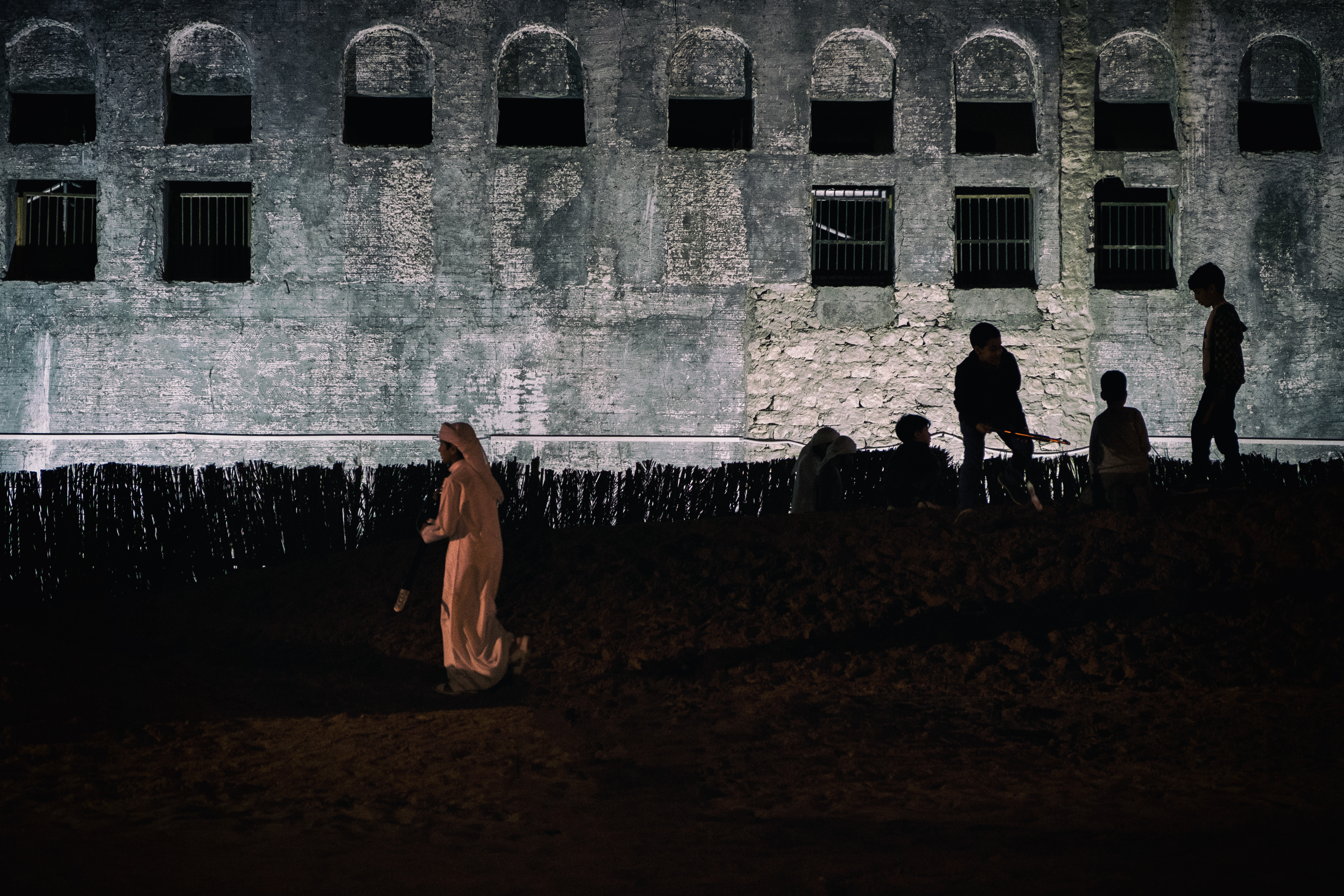
Qasr Al Hosn at night.

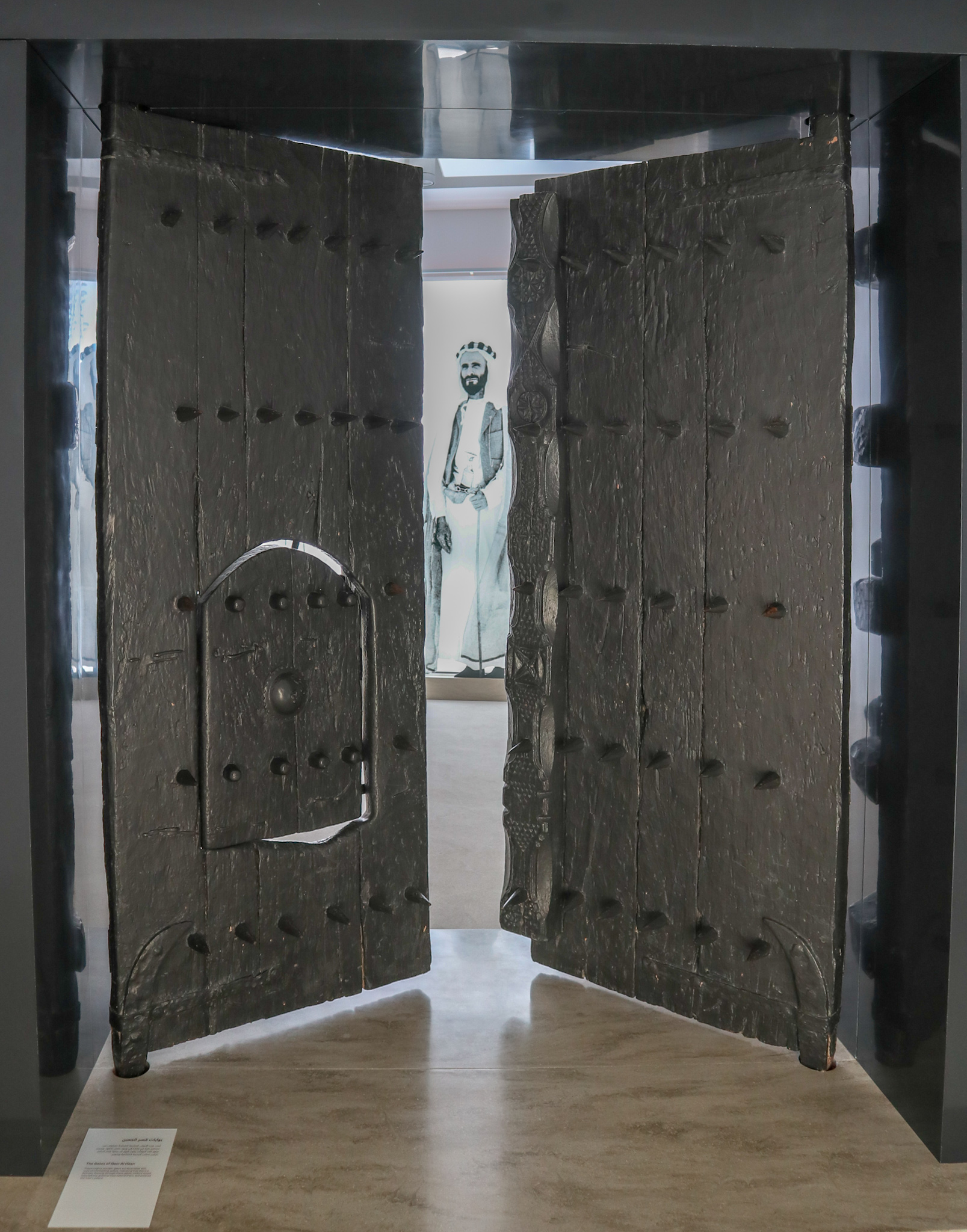
Old gates inside Qasr Al Hosn.

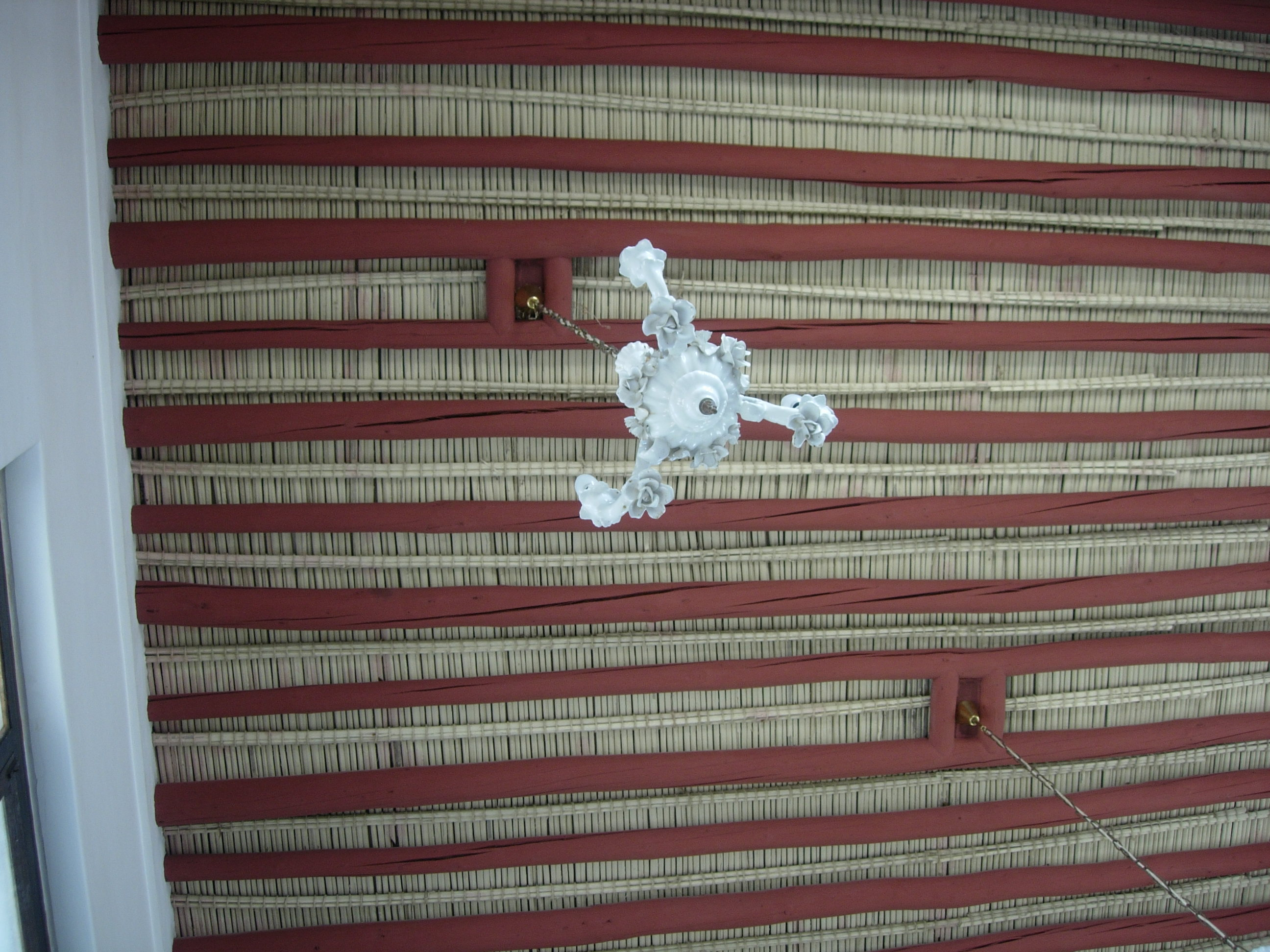
Historic ceiling inside Qasr Al Hosn.

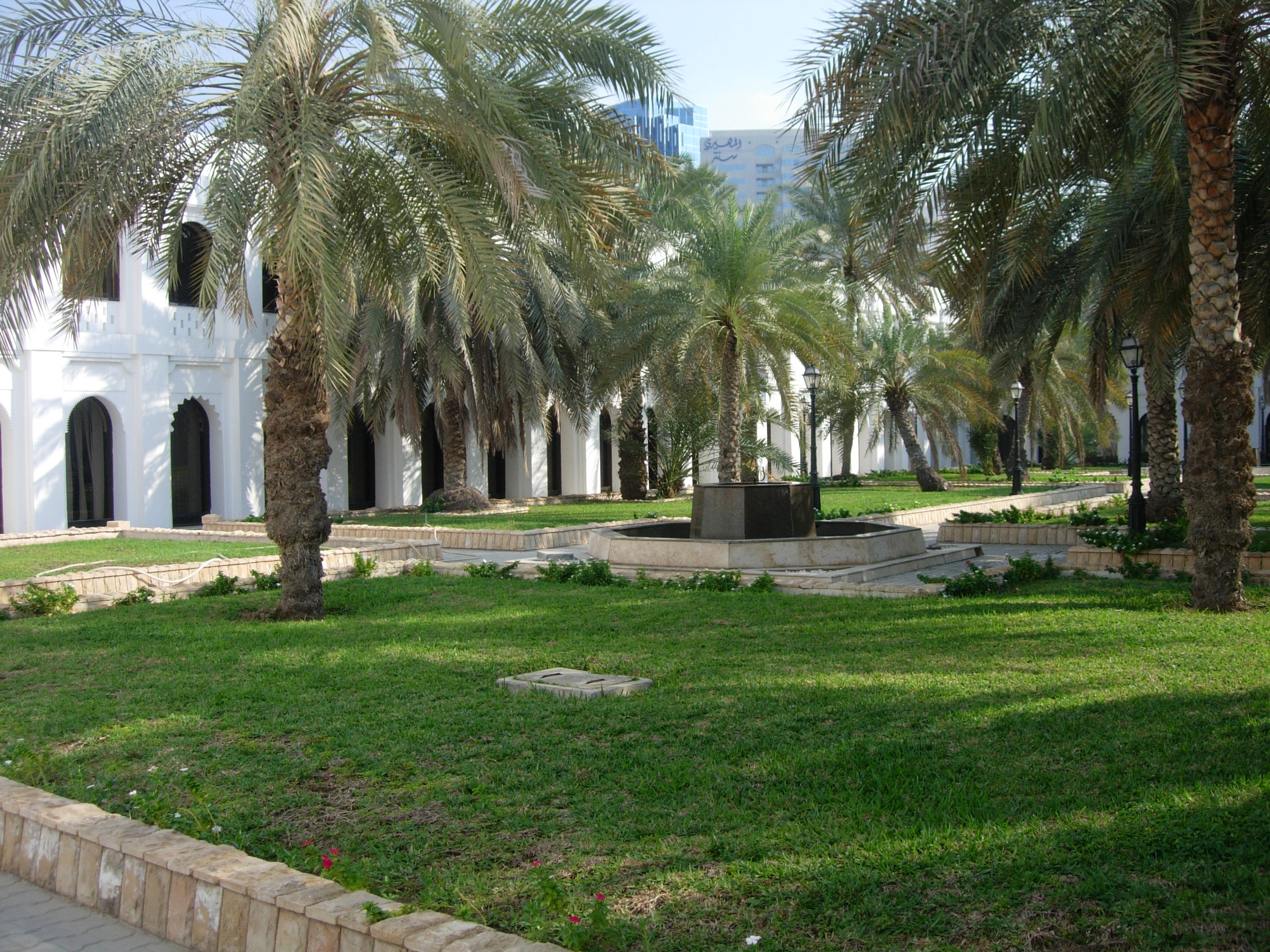
Interior courtyard of Qasr Al Hosn.
