= Khalifa bin Zayed bin Khalifa Al Nahyan =

Member of Al Nahyan dynasty

- Sheikh
- Born: c. 1856
- Issue: Mohammed
- House: Al Nahyan
- Father: Zayed I

Khalifa bin Zayed bin Khalifa Al Nahyan (Arabic: ٱلشَّيْخ خَلِیْفَة بِن زَایِد بِن خَلِیْفَة آل نَهْيَان, romanized: Ash-Shaykh Khalīfah bin Zāyid bin Khalīfah Āl Nahyān) was the eldest son of Abu Dhabi ruler Zayed bin Khalifa Al Nahyan. He was brother of four Abu Dhabi rulers, Tahnoun, Hamdan, Saqr and Sultan. Khalifa refused to ascend the throne when his father died in 1909, because his mother begged him to refuse, as she was sure he would be killed. He reportedly built Al-Muwaiji Fort in what is now the city of Al Ain during the early 20th century, during the reign of his father.

Khalifa's grandsons, Hamdan, Mubarak, Tahnoun and Saif, were the major supporters of Zayed bin Sultan when he became the ruler of Abu Dhabi in 1966. They assumed various major public roles. He is the great-grandfather of Nahyan bin Mubarak Al Nahyan.
