= Shakhbut bin Sultan Al Nahyan =

Emirati politician (1905–1989)

Shakhbut bin Sultan Al Nahyan; شخبوط بن سلطان آل نهيان
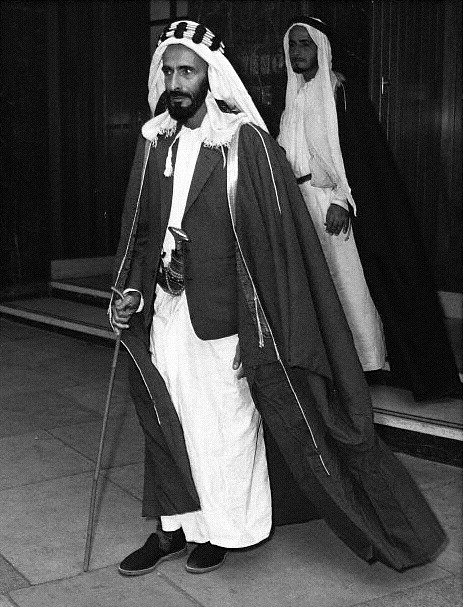
- Sheikh Shakhbut in 1961

Ruler of Abu Dhabi
- Reign: 1 January 1928 – 6 August 1966
- Predecessor: Saqr bin Zayed Al Nahyan
- Successor: Zayed bin Sultan Al Nahyan
- Born: 1 June 1905; Abu Dhabi, Trucial States
- Died: 11 February 1989 (aged 83); Abu Dhabi, United Arab Emirates
- Spouses: Fakhera bint Hazza Al Nahyan; Mariam bint Faisal Al Otaiba
- Issue: 2 sons and 4 daughters
- House: Al Nahyan
- Father: Sultan bin Zayed Al Nahyan
- Mother: Salama bint Butti Al Qubaisi
- Religion: Sunni Islam

Sheikh Shakhbut bin Sultan Al Nahyan (Arabic: شخبوط بن سلطان آل نهيان; 1 June 1905 – 11 February 1989) was the ruler of Abu Dhabi from 1928 to 1966. On 6 August 1966, Shakhbut was deposed by members of his family with assistance from Britain in a bloodless coup. His younger brother Zayed bin Sultan Al Nahyan succeeded him as the ruler of Abu Dhabi.

== Early life ==
Shakhbut was born in 1905. He was the eldest son of Sultan bin Zayed bin Khalifa Al Nahyan. His mother was Sheikha Salama bint Butti.

== Reign ==
Sheikh Shakhbut was installed following a coup against Sheikh Saqr bin Zayed Al Nahyan in 1928, becoming the ruler of the emirate of Abu Dhabi. During his reign, he adopted an aggressively mercantilist strategy, keeping his reserves in gold.

After the discovery of oil in Abu Dhabi in 1958, Abu Dhabi's elites were frustrated by Shakhbut's refusal to spend the petroleum royalties. At the request of Abu Dhabi's elites, the British, via the Trucial Oman Scouts, carried out a bloodless coup against Shakhbut on 6 August 1966, installing Sheikh Zayed bin Sultan Al Nahyan as the ruler of Abu Dhabi in his stead.

== Personal life ==
Shakhbut married twice. His first wife was his first cousin, Sheikha Fakhera bint Hazza Al Nahyan, and she was the mother of all his children. They had two sons, Saeed and Sultan. Both of his sons predeceased Shakhbut; they died in their youth while living in exile with their father. The elder son, Saeed, was married to his cousin, the daughter of his uncle Sheikh Zayed in Buraimi in 1963. He has a son named Tahnoun. Saeed's daughter, Fakhra is married to Nahyan bin Mubarak Al Nahyan. Sultan also had a son, Khalifa. Their descendants continue to live in the emirate of Abu Dhabi. In addition to his two sons, Sheikh Shakhbut also had four daughters, Osha, Mozah, Qoot and Rawdha. Shakhbut's second wife was Mariam bint Rashid Al Otaiba. They did not have children together.

After being deposed, Shakhbut and his family went into exile to Iran under his brother Zayed's orders. They resided in the Khuzestan province of Iran. They were hosted by Sheikh Abdulkarim Al-Faisali of the Banu Tamim tribe.

== Honours ==
On 24 April 1966 King Hussein of Jordan awarded him the Nahda Order, then the highest Jordanian honour.

Shakhbut bin Sultan Al Nahyan House of Al Nahyan Born: 1905 Died: 1989
Regnal titles
Preceded by Sheikh Saqr bin Zayed	Ruler of Abu Dhabi; 1928–1966	Succeeded by Sheikh Zayed II bin Sultan
