= Saqr bin Zayed Al Nahyan =

- Sheikh

Ruler of Abu Dhabi
- Reign: 4 August 1926 – 1 January 1928
- Predecessor: Sultan bin Zayed Al Nahyan
- Successor: Shakhbut bin Sultan Al Nahyan
- Died: 1 January 1928
- House: Al Nahyan
- Father: Zayed bin Khalifa Al Nahyan
- Religion: Sunni Islam

Saqr bin Zayed Al Nahyan was the Ruler of Abu Dhabi from 1926 to 1928. He was the half brother of Sultan bin Zayed bin Khalifa Al Nahyan (Ruler of Abu Dhabi from 1922 to 1926), whom he shot and killed to become Ruler himself. He was the uncle of Zayed bin Sultan Al Nahyan and Shakhbut bin Sultan Al Nahyan, his successor.

At the instigation of Khalifa bin Zayed, the Emir Saqir was assassinated on New Year's Day 1928 by members of the Al-Bu Shaar sect of the Al Manasir, who installed Shakhbut bin Sultan Al Nahyan, the son of Saqr's predecessor and brother, Sultan bin Zayed, as the new Emir. Shakhbut became the new ruler of Abu Dhabi.

Saqr bin Zayed Al Nahyan House of Al Nahyan Born: 1887
Regnal titles
Preceded by Sheikh Sultan bin Zayed bin Khalifa Al Nahyan	Ruler of Abu Dhabi; August 4, 1926 – January 1, 1928	Succeeded by Sheikh Shakhbut bin Sultan Al Nahyan
