= Sultan bin Zayed bin Khalifa Al Nahyan =

- Sheikh

Ruler of Abu Dhabi
- Reign: 1922–1926
- Predecessor: Hamdan bin Zayed Al Nahyan
- Successor: Saqr bin Zayed Al Nahyan
- Born: Abu Dhabi, Trucial States
- Died: 1926
- Spouse: Salama bint Butti Al-Qubaisi
- Issue: Shakhbut; Khalid; Hazza; Zayed; Mariam
- House: Al Nahyan
- Father: Zayed the Great
- Religion: Islam

Sheikh Sultan bin Zayed bin Khalifa Al Nahyan (Arabic: ٱلشَّيْخ سُلْطَان بْن زَایِد بْن خَلِیْفَة آل نَهْيَان, romanized: Sulṭān bin Zāyid bin Ḵalīfa Āl Nahyān) was the ruler of the Emirate of Abu Dhabi from 1922 to 1926. Two of his sons, Shakhbut and Zayed, ruled Abu Dhabi for seventy six years (from 1928 to 2004).

Sultan killed his brother Hamdan in 1922 to rule Abu Dhabi, but was himself toppled and killed by another brother, Saqr, in 1926.

== Children ==
Sheikh Sultan had at least four sons, the eldest of whom was Shakbut, and the youngest of whom was Zayed, also called Zayed II.

Name	Lifespan	Notes
Shakbut	(ca. 1905 – 11 February 1989)	Ruler of Abu Dhabi from 1928 to 1966; Son of Salama bint Butti
Hazza	1907-1958	He married Mariam bint Hamdan bin Zayed Al Nahyan and Mariam bint Saeed bin Zayed Al Nahyan. Son of Salama bint Butti; No children
Khalid		Founder of Khalidiyah area. One son Mohammad
Zayed	(6 May 1918 – 2 November 2004)	Ruler of Abu Dhabi from 6 August 1966 to 2 November 2004; Father of incumbent ruler Mohamed bin Zayed Al Nahyan; Son of Salama bint Butti
Mariam		

Sultan bin Zayed bin Khalifa Al Nahyan House of Al Nahyan Died: 1926
Regnal titles
Preceded by Sheikh Hamdan bin Zayed	Ruler of Abu Dhabi; 1922–1926	Succeeded by Sheikh Saqr bin Zayed
