= House of Nahyan =

Royal family in the United Arab Emirates

House of Nahyan آل نهيان
- Royal house
- Parent house: Bani Yas; Al Falahi
- Country: United Arab Emirates
- Founded: 1761; 265 years ago
- Founder: Dhiyab bin Isa Al Nahyan (died 1793)
- Current head: Mohamed bin Zayed Al Nahyan
- Titles: Ruler of Abu Dhabi; Sheikh
- Style: His/Her Highness
- Connected families: House of Al Falasi; House of Maktoum

The House of Nahyan (Arabic: آل نهيان, romanized: Āl Nuhayān) is the ruling royal family of the Emirate of Abu Dhabi, and one of the six ruling families of the United Arab Emirates. The family is a branch of the House of Al Falahi (Āl Bū Falāḥ), a branch of the Bani Yas tribe. They are related to the House of Al Falasi from which the ruling family of Dubai, the Al Maktoum, descends.

== History ==
The House of Nahyan is a branch of the House of Al Falahi (Āl Bū Falāḥ), a branch of the Bani Yas tribe. The Bani Yas came to Abu Dhabi in the 18th century from Liwa Oasis. They have ruled Abu Dhabi since 1793, and previously ruled Liwa. Five of the rulers were overthrown and eight were killed in coups between 1793 and 1966; many were brothers.

=== 21st century ===
The Al Nahyan family controls multiple sovereign wealth funds including the Abu Dhabi Investment Authority and Mubadala Investment Company that have an estimated US$1 trillion worth of assets under management. In 2024, the family was ranked second in the list of world's richest families.

== Rulers ==
The following Al Nahyan family members have ruled Abu Dhabi:

Name	Lifespan	Reign start	Reign end	Notes	Family	Image
Dhiyab bin Isa Al Nahyan: ذياب بن عيسى آل نهيان	1700 – 1793	1761	1793 (killed by his cousin Hazza bin Zayed bin Muhammad bin Falah)	Leader of the Bani Yas tribal confederation and founder of the Al Falahi dynasty, which still rules Abu Dhabi	House of Nahyan	
Shakhbut bin Dhiyab Al Nahyan: شخبوط بن ذياب آل نهيان	Unknown	1793	1816 (deposed by his son)	Son of Dhiyab bin Isa Al Nahyan	House of Nahyan	
Muhammad bin Shakhbut Al Nahyan: محمد بن شخبوط آل نهيان	Unknown	1816	1818 (deposed by his brother, Tahnun bin Shakhbut Al Nahyan, with the support of their father and sent to exile)	Son of Shakhbut bin Dhiyab Al Nahyan	House of Nahyan	
Tahnun bin Shakhbut Al Nahyan: طحنون بن شخبوط آل نهيان	Unknown – 1833	1818	April 1833 (killed by his two brothers)	Son of Shakhbut bin Dhiyab Al Nahyan	House of Nahyan	
Khalifa bin Shakhbut Al Nahyan: خليفة بن شخبوط آل نهيان	Unknown – 1845	April 1833	1845 (killed by his maternal nephew, Isa bin Khalid al-Falahi, at the conclusion of the feast on the beach at Abu Dhabi)	Son of Shakhbut bin Dhiyab Al Nahyan	House of Nahyan	
Saeed bin Tahnun Al Nahyan: سعيد بن طحنون آل نهيان	Unknown – January 1855	December 1845	1855 (death by natural causes)	Son of Tahnun bin Shakhbut Al Nahyan	House of Nahyan	
Zayed bin Khalifa Al Nahyan: زايد بن خليفة آل نهيان	1835 – 19 May 1909	1855	May 1909 (death by natural causes)	Son of Khalifa bin Shakhbut Al Nahyan and grandfather of the founder of the United Arab Emirates, Sheikh Zayed bin Sultan Al Nahyan	House of Nahyan	
Tahnoun bin Zayed Al Nahyan: طحنون بن زايد آل نهيان	1857 – October 1912	May 1909	October 1912 (death by natural causes)	Son of Zayed bin Khalifa Al Nahyan	House of Nahyan	
Hamdan bin Zayed Al Nahyan: حمدان بن زايد آل نهيان	Unknown – 22 August 1922	October 1912	22 August 1922 (killed by his younger brother, Sultan bin Zayed Al Nahyan)	Son of Zayed bin Khalifa Al Nahyan	House of Nahyan	
Sultan bin Zayed Al Nahyan: سلطان بن زايد آل نهيان	Unknown – 4 August 1926	22 August 1922	4 August 1926 (killed by his brother, Saqr bin Zayed Al Nahyan)	Son of Zayed bin Khalifa Al Nahyan and father of the founder of the United Arab Emirates, Sheikh Zayed bin Sultan Al Nahyan	House of Nahyan	
Saqr bin Zayed Al Nahyan: صقر بن زايد آل نهيان	Unknown – 1 January 1928	4 August 1926	1 January 1928 (killed by members of the Al Bu Shaar section of the Al Manasir tribe)	Son of Zayed bin Khalifa Al Nahyan	House of Nahyan	
Shakhbut bin Sultan Al Nahyan: شخبوط بن سلطان آل نهيان	1 June 1905 – 11 February 1989	1 January 1928	6 August 1966 (deposed in the bloodless coup by the Trucial Oman Scouts to the benefit of his brother, Zayed bin Sultan Al Nahyan)	Son of Sultan bin Zayed Al Nahyan	House of Nahyan	
Zayed bin Sultan Al Nahyan: زايد بن سلطان آل نهيان	6 May 1918 – 2 November 2004	6 August 1966	2 November 2004 (death by natural causes)	Son of Sultan bin Zayed Al Nahyan and first president of the United Arab Emirates	House of Nahyan	
Khalifa bin Zayed Al Nahyan: خليفة بن زايد بن سلطان آل نهيان	7 September 1948 – 13 May 2022	2 November 2004	13 May 2022 (death by natural causes)	Son of Zayed bin Sultan Al Nahyan and second president of the United Arab Emirates	House of Nahyan	
Mohamed bin Zayed Al Nahyan: محمد بن زايد آل نهيان	11 March 1961 – present	13 May 2022	present	Son of Zayed bin Sultan Al Nahyan and current president of the United Arab Emirates	House of Nahyan	

== Genealogy ==
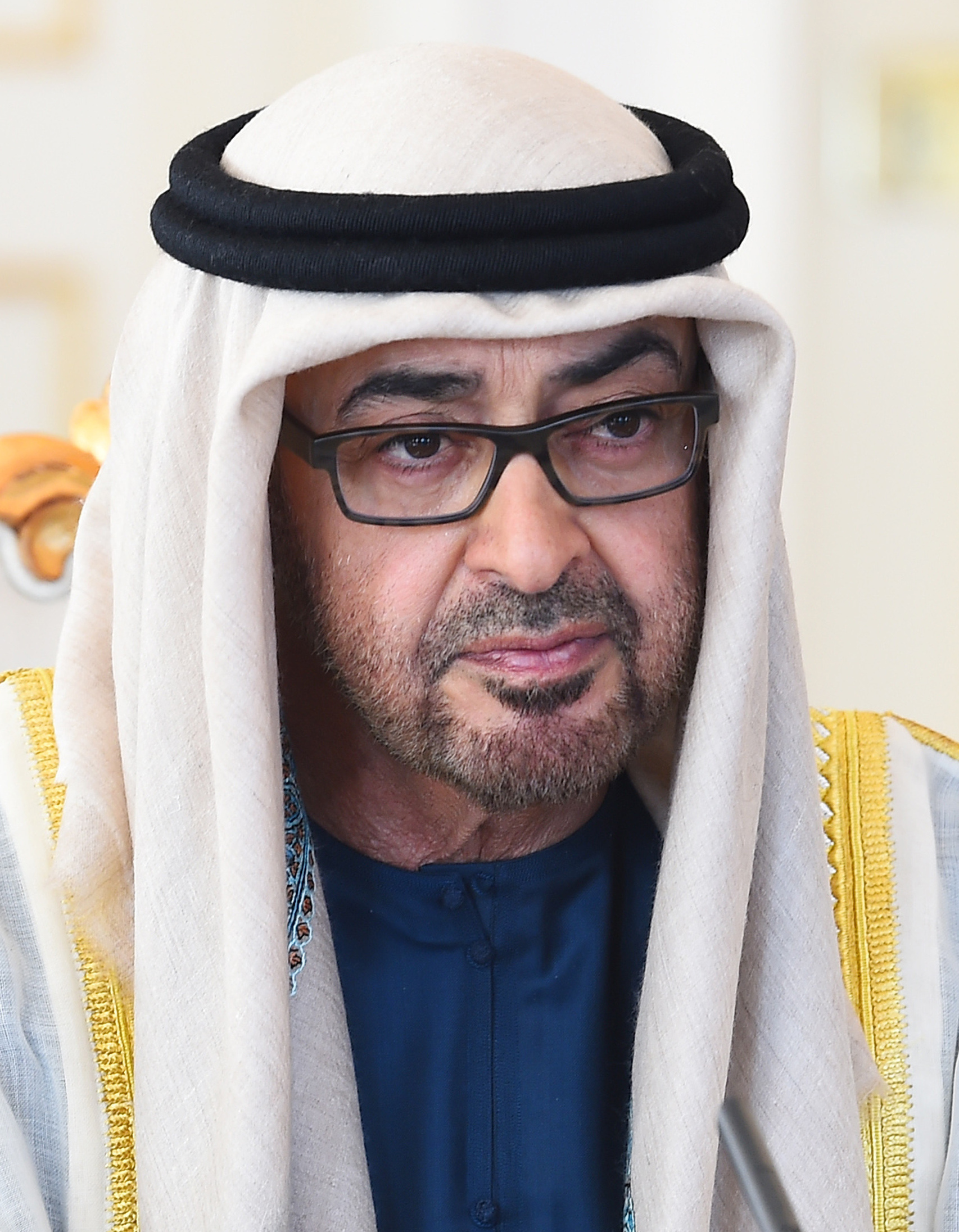
The current head of the family, Sheikh Mohamed bin Zayed Al Nahyan

Current ruler of Abu Dhabi
Previous ruler of Abu Dhabi

Dhiyab bin Isa^{(1)} r. 1761–1793
Shakhbut bin Dhiyab^{(2)} r. 1793–1816
Muhammad bin Shakhbut^{(3)} r. 1816–1818	Tahnun bin Shakhbut^{(4)} r. 1818–1833	Khalifa bin Shakhbut^{(5)} r. 1833–1845
Saeed bin Tahnun^{(7)} r. 1845–1855	Zayed bin Khalifa^{(8)} r. 1855–1909
Tahnoun bin Zayed^{(9)} r. 1909–1912	Hamdan bin Zayed^{(10)} r. 1912–1922	Sultan bin Zayed^{(11)} r. 1922-1926	Saqr bin Zayed^{(12)} r. 1926–1928	Khalifa bin Zayed; Al Nahyan
Mohammed bin Khalifa; Al Nahyan
Shakhbut bin Sultan^{(13)} r. 1928–1966	Fatima bint Mubarak; Al Ketbi	Zayed bin Sultan^{(14)} r. 1966–2004; President^{(1)} t. 1971–2004	Hassa bint Mohammed; Al Nahyan
Mohamed bin Zayed^{(16)} r. 2022–present President^{(3)} t. 2022–present	Khalifa bin Zayed^{(15)} r. 2004–2022; President^{(2)} t. 2004–2022
Khaled bin Mohamed; Al Nahyan

== Controversy ==
The Nahyan family was involved in the criminal Bank of Credit and Commerce International and was its largest investor; the bank collapsed in 1991. According to information from U.S. investigators, the bank allegedly operated a prostitution ring. Bank employees are said to have provided members of the royal family with virgins aged 16 to 20, who were flown in from Pakistan. Some of the prepubescent girls were injured in the process.

In April 2009, Sheikh Issa bin Zayed, a member of the Al Nahyan royal family, was subject to a controversy where he was allegedly shown to be torturing a man.

In 2017, several Emirati princesses from the Al Nahyan family were found guilty in a Belgium court over the inhumane treatment of servants, an incident that occurred between 2007 and 2008.

== See also ==
- Royal families of the United Arab Emirates
- List of Sunni Muslim dynasties
- List of rulers of separate Emirates of the United Arab Emirates
