= Political history of the United Arab Emirates =

The political history of the United Arab Emirates covers political events and trends related to the history of the United Arab Emirates.

== Trucial States period, 1820–1971 ==
Before the Trucial States, the dominant force in the area was the Ras Al Khaimah ruled by the Al Qasimi dynasty. After decades of incidents where British shipping had fallen foul of the aggressive Al Qasimi, an expeditionary force embarked for Ras Al Khaimah in 1809. This campaign led to the signing of a peace treaty between the British and Hassan bin Rahma Al Qasimi, the Al Qasimi leader. This broke down in 1815.

=== British subjugation ===
In the Persian Gulf campaign of 1819 a British punitive expedition embarked from Bombay, India in November 1819 to attack Ras Al Khaimah. The campaign was militarily successful for the British and led to the signing of the General Maritime Treaty of 1820 between the British and the Sheikhs of what was then known as the 'Pirate Coast', would become known as the 'Trucial Coast' after this and later treaties. In 1892 they entered into "Exclusivity Agreements" with the British which put them under British protection. This was an unclear status which fell short of a formal protectorate, but required Britain to defend them from external aggression in exchange for exclusive British rights in the states.

The British mainly stayed out of the internal affairs of the States, with the political arrangements in the region largely remaining unchanged throughout the period. The British presence was exercised through the Political Resident subservient to the Indian Civil Service. This was understood by the local rulers as similar to an informal tribal power arrangement. Occasional gunboat diplomacy was also applied by the British. Nevertheless, the locals mainly saw the local sheikhs as their rulers, who themselves shared power with other local figures.

In the Hyacinth incident in 1910, a British military action against suspected gun runners based in Dubai resulted in street fighting between the town's citizens and British soldiers and culminated in the shelling of Dubai by HMS Hyacinth using high explosive munitions. The attack and subsequent bombardment resulted in the killing of 37 of Dubai's townspeople, as well as four dead and five wounded British servicemen.

=== Dubai instability ===
After the Great Depression created increased disaffection, an assassination attempt was undertaken against the local Sheikh, Saeed bin Maktoum bin Hasher Al Maktoum, who was rescued by British forces. Nevertheless, there were growing demands for redistribution of the Sheikh's wealth to the wider community by the extended elite. The reform movement also demanded a council to take over governance, with a majlis of 15 members but under the Sheikh's veto formed on 22 October 1938. Many social reforms were subsequently achieved. However, after the majlis had restricted the Sheikh's income, he disbanded it on 29 March 1939 and had many leaders of the reformers killed, leading to its collapse.

One of the Sheik's opponents, Mani bin Rashid, escaped to Sharjah to continue resistance. By 3 September 1939, Dubai and Sharjah were ready to go to war. Mani meanwhile was ready to mount a coup in Dubai. His forces met those of Rashid bin Saeed Al Maktoum, the new acting regent of Dubai, outside the city, but was forced back after a skirmish. Finally, an intervention by the Sheikh of Abu Dhabi, Shakhbut bin Sultan Al Nahyan, put an end to the conflict. Nevertheless, Sharjah sent troops to the Dubai side, in response to which Dubai declared war and small-scale fighting broke out. A truce was agreed on 9 March 1940.

=== Independence and unification ===
Towards the end of World War II, the British Political Resident called a meeting of all the Sheiks on 7 March 1945, the first such meeting in 40 years. This created the precedent for regular meetings later on. A shared military force was created as the Trucial Oman Scouts in 1951. Action was soon seen against Saudi Arabian forces during the Buraimi dispute during 1952 to 1955. The Trucial States Council was created in 1952 with the seven Sheikhs, and providing common services of police, customs, health, and education.

In the 1950s, Arab nationalism began spreading to the Gulf. The Dubai National Front was established to oppose British presence with the support of Egypt, with attacks against infrastructure and political targets. The British banned visits by representatives of the Arab League, and when Saqr bin Sultan Al Qasimi planned to issue them passports to get around the ban, he was deposed in 1965. Following his exile to Egypt, he returned in 1972 in an attempted coup that failed.

After Shakhbut bin Sultan Al Nahyan became an obstacle on the road to unification, he was also deposed by Zayed bin Sultan Al Nahyan in 1966. In 1968, the United Kingdom announced a withdrawal of East of Suez. Following this, Dubai and Abu Dhabi agreed to form a union with the Union Accord, also inviting the other Trucial States as well as Bahrain and Qatar, with Abu Dhabi as the capital and Zayed as the head of state owing to Abu Dhabi's overwhelming wealth. Ras Al Khaimah, Bahrain and Qatar later opted out, while the United Arab Emirates were formally established on 18 July 1971. Sharjah also stayed out.

On 30 Nov 1971, shortly after the withdrawal of British forces from the islands of Abu Musa and the Greater and Lesser Tunbs, the seizure of Abu Musa and the Greater and Lesser Tunbs by the Imperial Iranian Navy took place. Following the seizure of the islands by Iran, both the emirates of Sharjah and Ras al-Khaimah acceded to the newly-formed United Arab Emirates, doing so on 2 Dec 1971 and 10 Feb 1972, respectively, causing the United Arab Emirates to inherit the territorial dispute with Iran over the islands. Iran has maintained its control over the islands since their seizure.

== Independent state, 1971–present ==
The UAE founded the Gulf Cooperation Council in 1981 with fellowArab states of the Persian Gulf at a meeting in Abu Dhabi following the Iran–Iraq War. During the Gulf War, UAE forces participated in fighting while US forces used the country as a base. Zayed died in 2004, and was replaced by his son Khalifa bin Zayed Al Nahyan. Zayed's reportedly favourite wife Fatima bint Mubarak Al Ketbi was able to promote her sons into powerful positions. These included Sheikh Mohammed, Sheikh Hamdan, Sheikh Hazza, Sheikh Tahnoun, Sheikh Mansour, Sheikh Abdullah, Sheikha Shamma and Sheikha Alyazia. They are the most powerful block in the ruling family of Abu Dhabi, the Al Nahyans.

In January 2014, when Sheikh Khalifa suffered a stroke, Mohamed became the de facto ruler of Abu Dhabi, controlling almost every aspect of UAE policymaking. He is seen as the driving force behind the UAE's interventionist foreign policy and is a leader of a campaign against Islamist movements in the Arab world. He supported the Saudi-led, western-backed intervention in Yemen to drive out Houthi militants after the Houthi takeover in Yemen. In August 2020, Trump, Israeli prime minister Benjamin Netanyahu and Sheikh Mohamed jointly announced the establishment of formal Israel–United Arab Emirates relations. After the death of Sheikh Khalifa on 13 May 2022, Mohamed became the ruler of Abu Dhabi; he was elected to the presidency of the United Arab Emirates the next day.

Political scientists have characterized Mohamed bin Zayed as the strongman leader of an authoritarian regime, as there are no free and fair elections, political and civil rights are limited, free speech is restricted, and there are no free and independent media. According to the human rights organizations Amnesty International and Human Rights Watch, the UAE practices torture, arbitrary detention, and forced disappearance of citizens and residents. Political scientist Christopher Davidson has characterized Mohamed's tenure as de facto UAE leader as entailing a "a marked and rapid intensification of autocratic-authoritarianism." Democracy indicators show "recent and substantial efforts to tighten up almost all remaining political and civic freedoms."
