= List of Al Ain FC presidents =

Al Ain Football Club is a football club based in Al Ain, Abu Dhabi, United Arab Emirates that competes in Pro League.

== History ==
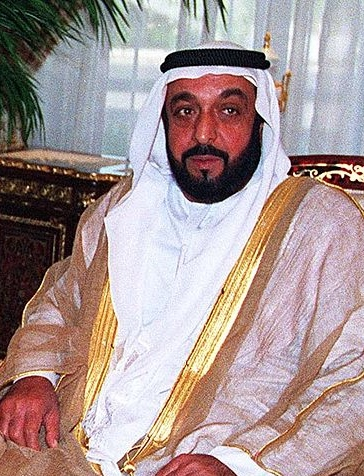
Sheikh Khalifa bin Zayed Al Nahyan club Honorary President since 1974.

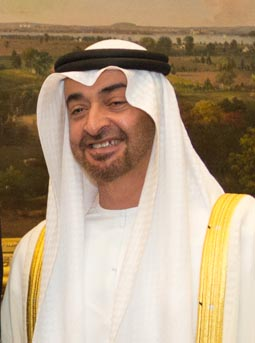
Sheikh Mohammed bin Zayed is the current club president since 1979.

Since its founding in 1968, Sheikh Khalifa bin Zayed Al Nahyan, helped the club financially and gave the founders the first club headquarters, became club Honorary President on 13 November 1974. The first board of directors of the club was formed after the merger under the chairmanship Mohammed Salem Al Dhaheri in 1974. On 21 May 1975, Sheikh Sultan bin Zayed Al Nahyan was elected Chairman of Board of Directors. Mohammed Bin Zayed Al Nahyan became president of Al Ain on 19 January 1979.

== List of presidents ==
Al Ain FC Presidents
Name	Nationality	From	To	Honours
Sultan Bin Zayed Al Nahyan	Emirati	21 May 1975	1979	1 Abu Dhabi Championship Cup, 1 Pro League
Mohammed Bin Zayed Al Nahyan	Emirati	19 January 1979	Present	12 Pro League, 7 President's Cup, 1 League Cup, 5 Super Cup, 1 Gulf Club Champions Cup, 1 AFC Champions League, 3 Federation Cup, 1 Joint League Cup, 2 Vice Presidents Cup

== Board of directors ==
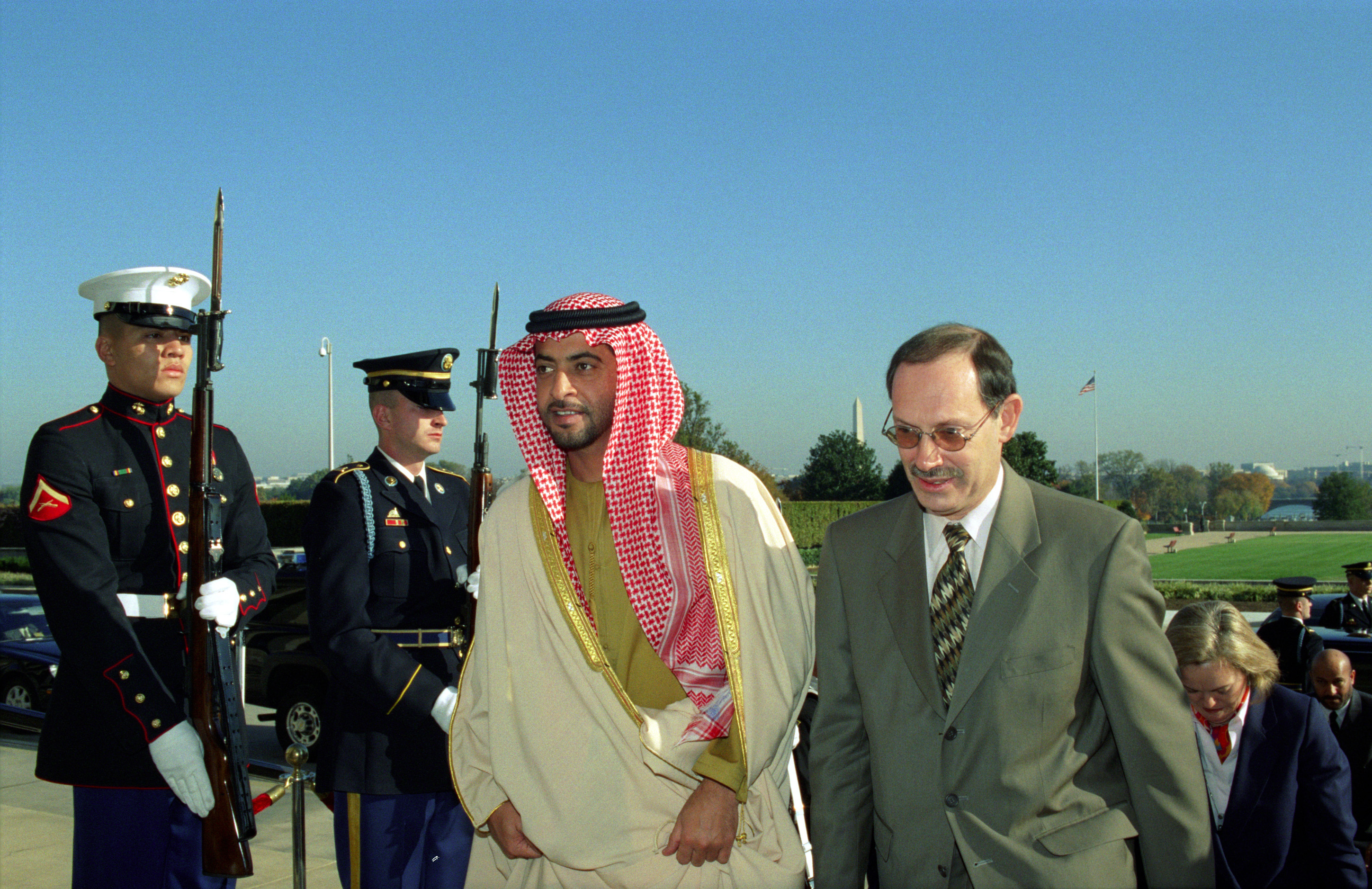
Hamdan bin Zayed, was elected vice chairman of board of directors in 18 March 1983 until he resigned in 2 May 1984 after he was selected as president of the UAEFA in the same period.

=== 1974 ===
Office	Name
Chairman of Board of Directors	Mohammed Salem Al Dhaheri
Vice Chairman of Board of Directors	Sultan Abdullah Ghulom
Team Manager	Abdullah Mohammed

The first board of directors.

=== 2011–16 ===
Office	Name
President; Honorary Board President	Mohammed Bin Zayed
First Deputy President; Honorary Board First Deputy President	Hazza Bin Zayed
Second Deputy President; Honorary Board Second Deputy President	Tahnoun bin Zayed
Chairman of Board of Directors	Abdullah bin Mohammed bin Khaled Al Nahyan
Vice Chairman of Board of Directors	Rashid bin Mubarak Al Hajri
Member of Board of Directors	Awad bin Hasoom Al Darmaki
Member of Board of Directors	Mohammed Abdullah bin Bdouh
Member of Board of Directors	Mohammed bin Obaid Al Dhaheri

From 25 March 2011 To 6 August 2016.
Source: 1

=== 2016–19 ===
Office	Name
President; Honorary Board President	Mohammed Bin Zayed
First Deputy President; Honorary Board First Deputy President	Hazza Bin Zayed
Second Deputy President; Honorary Board Second Deputy President	Tahnoun bin Zayed
Chairman of Board of Directors	Ghanem Mubarak Al Hajeri
Vice Chairman of Board of Directors	Ahmed Humaid Al Mazroui
Member of Board of Directors	Mohammed Obaid Hammad
Member of Board of Directors	Sultan Rashed Al Kalbani
Member of Board of Directors	Ali Msarri Al Dhaheri

From 6 August 2016 To 22 June 2019.
Source: 2

=== 2019–2022 ===
Office	Name
President; Honorary Council President	Mohammed Bin Zayed
First Vice President; Honorary Council First Vice President; Chairman of the Board of Directors of Al Ain SCC	Hazza Bin Zayed
Second Vice President; Honorary Council Second Vice President	Tahnoun bin Zayed
Chairman of Board of Directors	Matar Al Darmaki
Vice Chairman of Board of Directors	Khaled Al Dhaheri
Board of Directors Member	Matar Al Dhaheri
Board of Directors Member	Salem Al Jneibi
Board of Directors Member	Majid Al Owais

From 22 June 2019 To 1 September 2022.
Source: 3

=== 2022–June 2023 ===
Office	Name
President; President of the Honorary Council	Mohammed Bin Zayed
First Vice President; First Vice President of the Honorary Council; Chairman of the Board of Directors of Al Ain SCC	Hazza Bin Zayed
Second Vice President; Second Vice President of the Honorary Council	Tahnoun bin Zayed
Vice Chairman of the Board of Directors of Al Ain SCC; Chairman of the Executive Committee	Sultan bin Hamdan bin Zayed
Chairman of Board of Directors	Matar Al Darmaki
Vice Chairman of Board of Directors	Khaled Al Dhaheri
Board of Directors Member	Matar Al Dhaheri
Board of Directors Member	Salem Al Jneibi
Board of Directors Member	Majid Al Owais

1 September 2022 – 7 June 2023.
Source: 1, 2

=== 2023– ===
Office	Name
President; President of the Honorary Council	Mohammed Bin Zayed
First Vice President; First Vice President of the Honorary Council; Chairman of the Board of Directors of Al Ain SCC	Hazza Bin Zayed
Second Vice President; Second Vice President of the Honorary Council	Tahnoun bin Zayed
Vice Chairman of the Board of Directors of Al Ain SCC; Chairman of the Executive Committee	Sultan bin Hamdan bin Zayed
Members of the Steering Committee	Matar Al Darmaki
Members of the Steering Committee	Mohamed Al Mahmood
Members of the Steering Committee	Awad Al Kaabi
Members of the Steering Committee	Mohammad Obaid Hammad

7 June 2023–10 June 2024
Source: alainclub.ae

=== 2024– ===
Office	Name
President; President of the Honorary Council	Mohammed Bin Zayed
First Vice President; First Vice President of the Honorary Council; Chairman of the Board of Directors of Al Ain SCC	Hazza Bin Zayed
Second Vice President; Second Vice President of the Honorary Council	Tahnoun bin Zayed
Vice Chairman of the Board of Directors of Al Ain SCC; Chairman of the Executive Committee; Chairman of the Board of Directors Al Ain FC	Sultan bin Hamdan bin Zayed
Supervising Sports affairs	Mohammed Al Mahmoud
Supervising Media affairs	Mohammed Al Ketbi
Supervising of Financial and Administrative affairs	Ziad Amir Ahmed Saleh
Supervising the Academy and Talents sector	Abdullah Mohammed Abdullah Khouri

10 June 2024–
Source: Wam.ae
