= Royal Group =

Company in the United Arab Emirates

- Industry: Investments, media, trade, financing, real estate, manufacturing, construction, information technology, education, entertainment, healthcare, hospitality, retail and robotics
- Key people: Tahnoon bin Zayed al-Nahyan (Chairman)
- Revenue: ▲
- Net income: ▲
- Total assets: ▲$300 billion USD, 61% share of International Holding Company with a market capitalization of 240 billion
- Owner: Abu Dhabi royal family
- Website: www.ihcuae.com

Royal Group is a family office of the Abu Dhabi royal family based in the United Arab Emirates (UAE), which is the world's second richest family after the Walton family. It is chaired by Tahnoon bin Zayed al-Nahyan. Royal Group is a limited liability company of 60 large and medium-sized companies and was founded in 1999. According to its website it owns businesses in "media, trade, financing, real estate, manufacturing, construction, information technology, education, entertainment, healthcare, hospitality, retail and robotics".

As of 2025, it had 300 billion US dollar in assets and it owned a 61% share of the International Holding Company which has a market capitalization of 240 billion US dollar.

In 2025, Royal Group stated it had 27,600 employees from more than 90 countries.

== See also ==
- Dubai Holding
