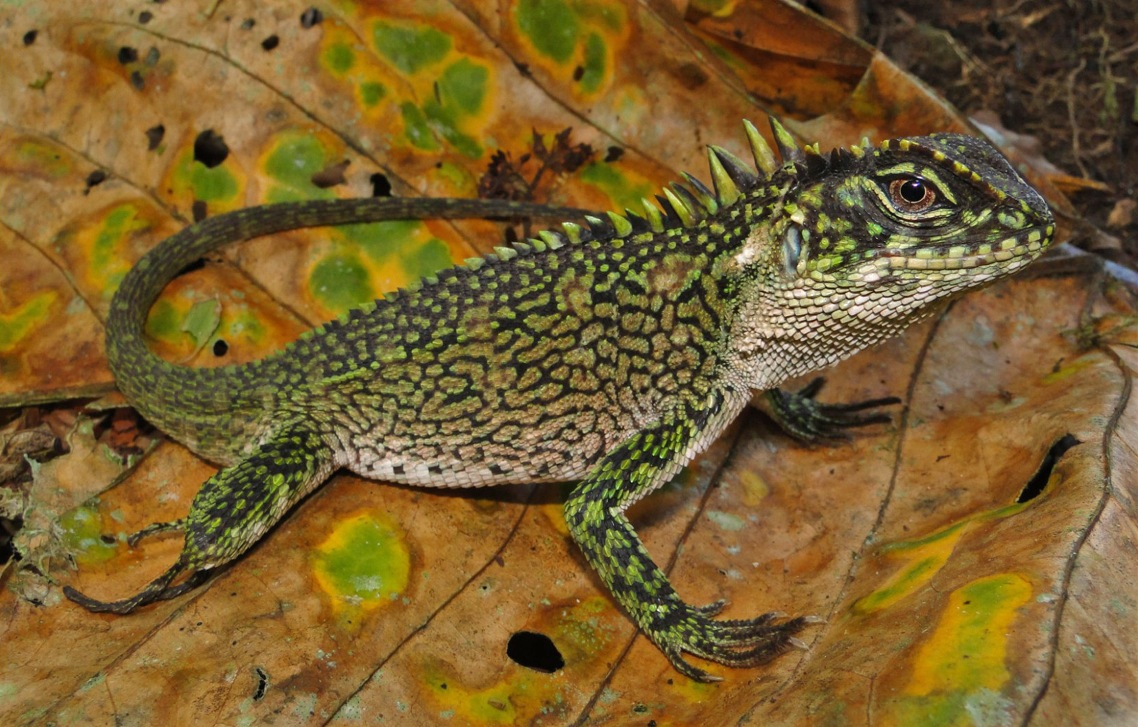
- Holotype, adult male
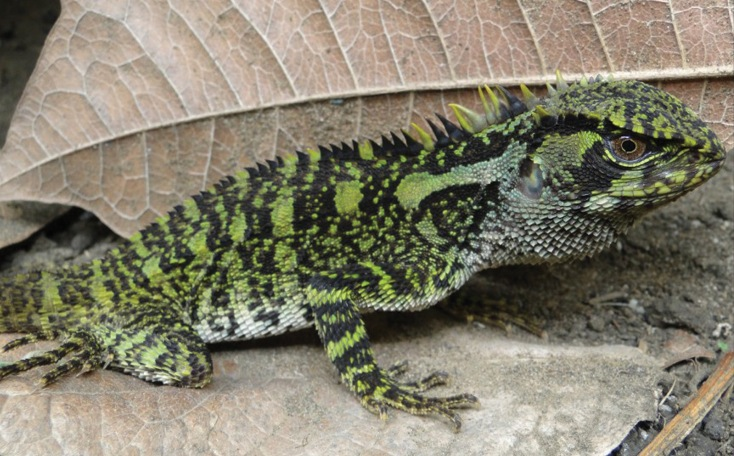
- Adult female

Conservation status
- Least Concern (IUCN 3.1)

Scientific classification
- Kingdom: Animalia
- Phylum: Chordata
- Class: Reptilia
- Order: Squamata
- Suborder: Iguania
- Family: Hoplocercidae
- Genus: Enyalioides
- Species: E. binzayedi

Binomial name
- Enyalioides binzayedi Venegas, Torres-Carvajal, Duran, de Queiroz, 2013

= Enyalioides binzayedi =

Lizard from Peru named after Mohammed bin Zayed

Enyalioides binzayedi is a species of lizard in the genus Enyalioides. It was formally described in 2013 and is named after Mohamed bin Zayed Al Nahyan, the Crown Prince of Abu Dhabi. It is known only from its type locality in the montane rainforest of the Río Huallaga basin in northeastern Peru at an elevation of 1080 m. This locality lies within the Cordillera Azul National Park, in a mountain ridge between the Departments of San Martín and Loreto. It is classified by the IUCN as being of least concern, as its entire range lies within the large national park and no threats are known.

== Taxonomy ==
Enyalioides binzayedi was formally described in 2013 by a group of Peruvian herpetologists based on an adult male specimen collected from Chambirillo station in the Cordillera Azul National Park, in the Department of San Martín, Peru. The species is named after Mohamed bin Zayed Al Nahyan, the Crown Prince of Abu Dhabi and founder of the Mohamed bin Zayed Species Conservation Fund, which funded the surveys that discovered this species.

== Description ==
The only known male had a dark brown or black head, with scattered light green scales (especially on the dorsal surface) and a dark longitudinal supratemporal stripe. The supralabials and infralabials were greenish-white, the former interspersed with dark brown. The rostral and mental scales were light green, while the gular scales were white with greenish-white margins and the dark gray skin in between the gulars. The dorsal background of the body, limbs, and tail is light green with a dark brown reticulation. There is a white blotch posterior to the tympanum, followed by five diffuse pale brown dorsolateral blotches extending from the neck to the base of the tail. The ventral surface of the body, limbs, and tail is white, with a longitudinal row of 4–5 dark gray squarish marks between the flanks and venter. The iris was coppery with fine brown reticulation and a round pupil with a pale green margin.

The holotype is the only adult male specimen available; it differs from female and subadult male paratypes in having projecting scales on each side of the vertebral crest on the neck. Additionally, female paratypes are unique in having a double vertebral crest from midbody to pelvic region. In females, the dorsal background can be dark greenish-brown, dark green, or dark brown speckled with light green flecks. Some females have light dorsolateral blotches interspersed with dark transverse bars, which are well-defined dorsolaterally and diffuse laterally. Some females have a pale blotch behind the tympanum similar to the holotype, whereas others have a larger pale blotch connected to first pale dorsolateral blotch, forming a continuous postympanic stripe extending from the tympanum to the scapular region. Ventrally, females are white or tan with scattered dark brown spots or flecks. The throat in females is generally brown or light brown with dark flecks or diffuse reticulations, although one female had a spotless tan throat.

A subadult male specimen differs from the holotype in having scattered black spots on the ventral surface of body. All females differ from the holotype in having dorsal, broad transverse bars arranged longitudinally along the vertebral line, larger dark marks on the ventrolateral surface of body, and well-defined postocular and supratemporal stripes.

Enyalioides binzayedi can be distinguished from other species in its genus by the combination of characters. The scales posterior to the superciliaries form a longitudinal row of strongly projecting scales across the lateral edge of the skull roof in adults of both sexes. There are 31 or fewer longitudinal rows of strongly keeled dorsals in a transverse line between the dorsolateral crests at midbody. The ventral scales are strongly keeled. The caudals increase in size posteriorly within each autotomic segment. There are no projecting scales on the body or limbs. The vertebrals on the neck are more than five times the size of the vertebrals between hind limbs in adult males.

== Distribution and habitat ==
Enyalioides binzayedi is known only from its type locality in the montane rainforest of the Río Huallaga basin in northeastern Peru at an elevation of 1080 m. This locality lies within the Cordillera Azul National Park, in a mountain ridge between the Departments of San Martín and Loreto. All known individuals were collected at night sleeping on the vertical stems of bushes 30–230 cm above the ground. One female collected on 21 January 2011 had two maturing eggs in each oviduct. Enyalioides binzayedi lives alongside many other species of lizards, including E. azulae and E. laticeps.

== Conservation ==
Despite its small range, Enyalioides binzayedi is classified by the IUCN as being of least concern, as its entire range lies within the large Cordillera Azul National Park and no threats to the species are known. It is rather common within its known range and is thought to have a stable population.

== Gallery ==
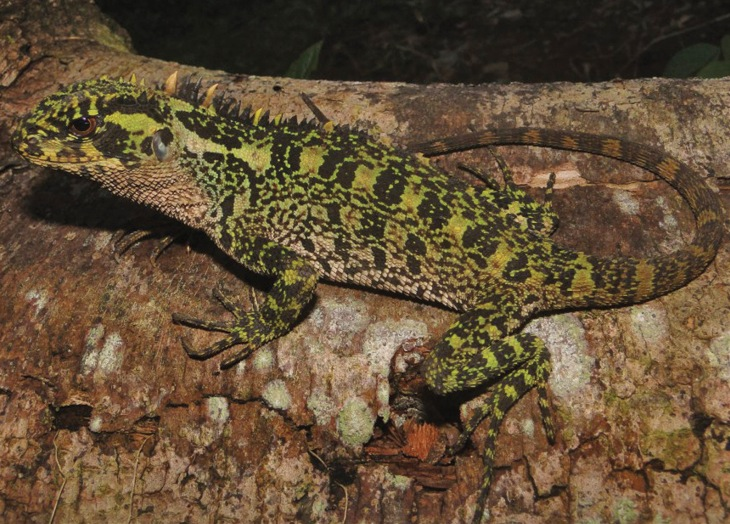
Adult female

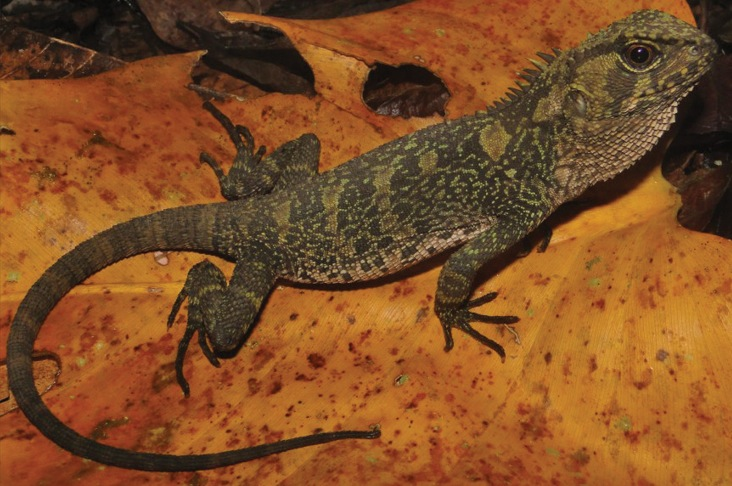
Adult female

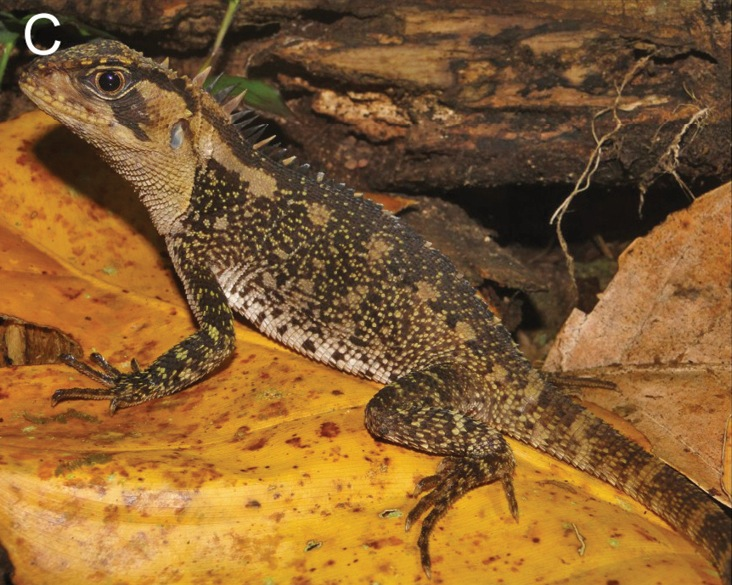
Adult female

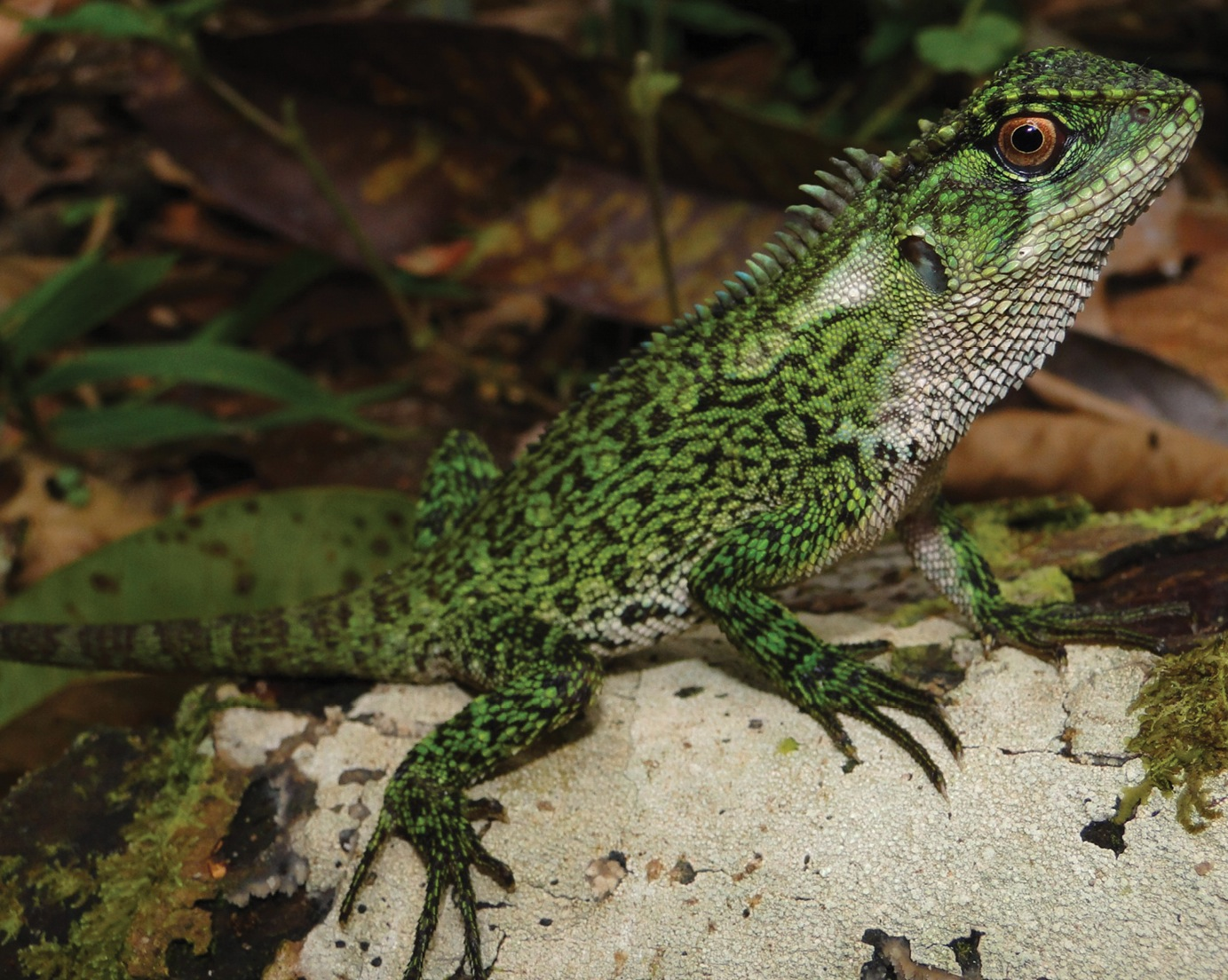
Juvenile male
