= International Holding Company =

Holding company in the United Arab Emirates

- Type: Public
- Traded as: ADX: IHC
- Industry: Investments
- Founded: 1998; 28 years ago
- Headquarters: Abu Dhabi, United Arab Emirates
- Key people: Tahnoon bin Zayed al-Nahyan (chairman); Syed Basar Shueb (CEO)
- Revenue: ▲$16.4 billion USD (2023)
- Net income: ▲$7.5 billion USD (2023)
- Total assets: ▲$455.043 billion USD (2023)
- Owner: Royal Group (60%)
- Website: www.ihcuae.com

Headquarters in Abu Dhabi

The International Holding Company (IHC) is a holding company headquartered in Abu Dhabi, United Arab Emirates, which manages a diversified portfolio of domestic and foreign investments. Royal Group, owned by the Abu Dhabi ruling dynasty, is the biggest shareholder at 61%. IHC´s chairman is Sheikh Tahnoon bin Zayed al-Nahyan, who also serves as the country's National Security Advisor and manages two sovereign wealth funds.

The company is listed on the Abu Dhabi stock exchange and as of 2024 had a market capitalization of 240 billion US dollar. After the Royal Group transferred 40 companies worth US$4.7 billion to IHC, the company's share price grew by 42,000% between 2019 and 2024, making it the second most valuable company in the Gulf States behind petroleum company Saudi Aramco. This transformation coincides with Tahnoon bin Zayed al-Nahyan's time as Chairman.

== History ==
International Holding Company (IHC) was founded in 1998 as Asmak and was initially active in the fisheries sector. The company quickly developed into a regional market leader in the export of seafood. In 2005, the company went public on the Abu Dhabi Stock Exchange, which enabled broader expansion.

From 2005 to 2018, IHC remained largely seafood-centric, with the company's activities concentrated on food and beverage and aquaculture. During this time, IHC expanded regionally, building facilities across the UAE and then entering the Oman and Saudi Arabia markets.

In 2019, IHC had 40 employees. This number increased to 125,000 by mid-2023. A 2019 leadership-driven pivot led the company to explore broader investments, converting the group into a diversified investment holding company.

In 2020, three of its subsidiaries—Palms Sports, Ghitha, and Easylease—were listed on the Abu Dhabi Securities Exchange. The following year, IHC's growth continued as the company listed three more subsidiaries—Alpha Dhabi, ESG and Al Seer Marine—and became the most valuable company on the Abu Dhabi Stock Exchange.

In April 2021, IHC acquired a 45% stake in construction giant Alpha Dhabi Holding (ADH). In December 2021, Multiply Group, a holding company that invests in tech-focused businesses, became IHC’s eighth subsidiary to be listed on Abu Dhabi's main stock market.

From 2021 to 2022, the company saw the number of its subsidiaries grow from 302 to 482 and its joint ventures and associates increase to 41.

IHC continued its expansion in 2022, concluding a US$2 billion investment agreement with the Indian Adani Group and acquiring a significant stake in the renewable energy sector with the purchase of shares of Turkish Kalyon Enerji. In September 2023, the IHC sold stakes in the Adani Group, but increased its stake in Adani Enterprises.

In February 2023, IHC acquired a 55% stake in Reach Employment Services, a recruitment and outsourcing company, for Dh315 million. In November 2023, the Group acquired a majority stake in a copper mine in Zambia for just under US$1 billion. In December 2023, ICH subsidiary EasyLease acquired a 60% stake in Ripe, which had a portfolio including container and commercial kiosk rentals, food trucks, and advanced management of parking facilities, event management, and drive-through services from vehicles.

In 2023, IHC established an investment unit, Lunate, to manage Group 42’s China-focused fund, the 42X Fund, which had stakes in JD.com and ByteDance. Lunate formed a small team controlled by Tahnoun bin Zayed. The fund became questionable due to G42 and its CEO Peng Xiao’s promise to the US government to divest from China.

In January 2024, IHC established a new holding company with $27 billion in assets called 2PointZero. It added to the opaqueness, as it was not published what price IHC had been paying to acquire these assets from Royal Group. IHC at that point represented 30% of the local stock market.

IHC was ranked second on Forbes Middle East's Top 100 Listed Companies 2025 list.

In April 2025, IHC, Abu Dhabi sovereign wealth fund ADQ, and First Abu Dhabi Bank (FAB) announced plans to launch a Dirham-backed stablecoin.

In May 2025, IHC announced the launch of a new reinsurance platform headquartered in the Abu Dhabi Global Market, backed by over $1 billion in initial equity commitments.

By mid-2025, IHC'a market cap exceeded 900 billion AED. In July 2025, IHC acquired eFunder, the UAE’s pioneering private financing platform for SMEs, and rebranded it as Zelo. In October 2025, IHC announced a merger of its flagship portfolio companies (Multiply Group, Ghitha Holding, and 2PointZero) to form 2PointZero Group. That same month, IHC announced it would acquire a 43.5% stake in Sammaan Capital for 88.50 billion rupees ($997.7 million), betting on India's fast-growing housing finance market.

In October 2025, the Government of Pakistan divested its 82.64% majority stake in the state-owned First Women Bank Limited (FWBL) to IHC in a transaction reportedly valued at $14.6 million. As part of the agreement, IHC committed to injecting an additional Rs. 6.8 billion to ensure the bank meets the State Bank of Pakistan's minimum capital requirement of Rs. 10 billion over a five-year period. IHC also announced plans to modernize its core banking infrastructure and expand its branch network from 42 to 200 in the medium term.

In November 2025, it was announced that IHC was planning to invest up to $24 billion in the following nine months as well as divest two to three companies to reconfigure its portfolio. In December 2025, IHC announced it had acquired a 70% stake in Peko Holdings Limited, a digital platform that streamlines financial and administrative operations for businesses.

== Operations ==
As of 2025, IHC manages a portfolio of more than 1,300 subsidiaries and 86 joint ventures and associates across over 41 countries. Its investments cover asset management, healthcare, real estate, financial services, and IT.

== Criticism ==
IHC has drawn scrutiny for its rapid and largely unexplained growth. Between 2019 and 2022, IHC's market capitalization surged from about 700 million AED to over 880 billion AED, an increase of more than 125,000%. This exponential rise, coupled with limited trading activity—often just a few dozen shares exchanged daily—has led analysts to question the company's valuation and transparency. The Financial Times noted that IHC went from relative obscurity to becoming Abu Dhabi's most valuable company within three years, despite little public disclosure regarding its financials or corporate strategy. The Wall Street Journal highlighted its stock’s nearly 400-fold increase, which puzzled market observers as it defied conventional market trends. Bloomberg reported on IHC’s staggering 2,819% rally over a 12-month period, labeling it "mysterious" and leaving traders uncertain about the driving forces behind its stock movements. Given its deep ties to Abu Dhabi’s ruling family, concerns persist about the company’s governance and the degree to which its valuation reflects actual market demand.

== Investments ==
IHC manages over 100 investments in the following sectors:

- Agriculture and fisheries
- Finance
- Healthcare
- Real estate and construction
- Food and beverages
- Utilities
- Renewable energy
- Manufacturing
- IT and communication
- Retail and leisure

In 2023, the Real Estate and Construction segment represented the largest share of the Group's revenue (33.9%), followed by Agriculture and Fisheries (29.6%) and Food and Beverages (6.9%).

== See also ==
- Abu Dhabi Developmental Holding Company
