= Mohamed bin Zayed Al Nahyan =

President of the United Arab Emirates since 2022

Mohamed bin Zayed Al Nahyan; محمد بن زايد آل نهيان
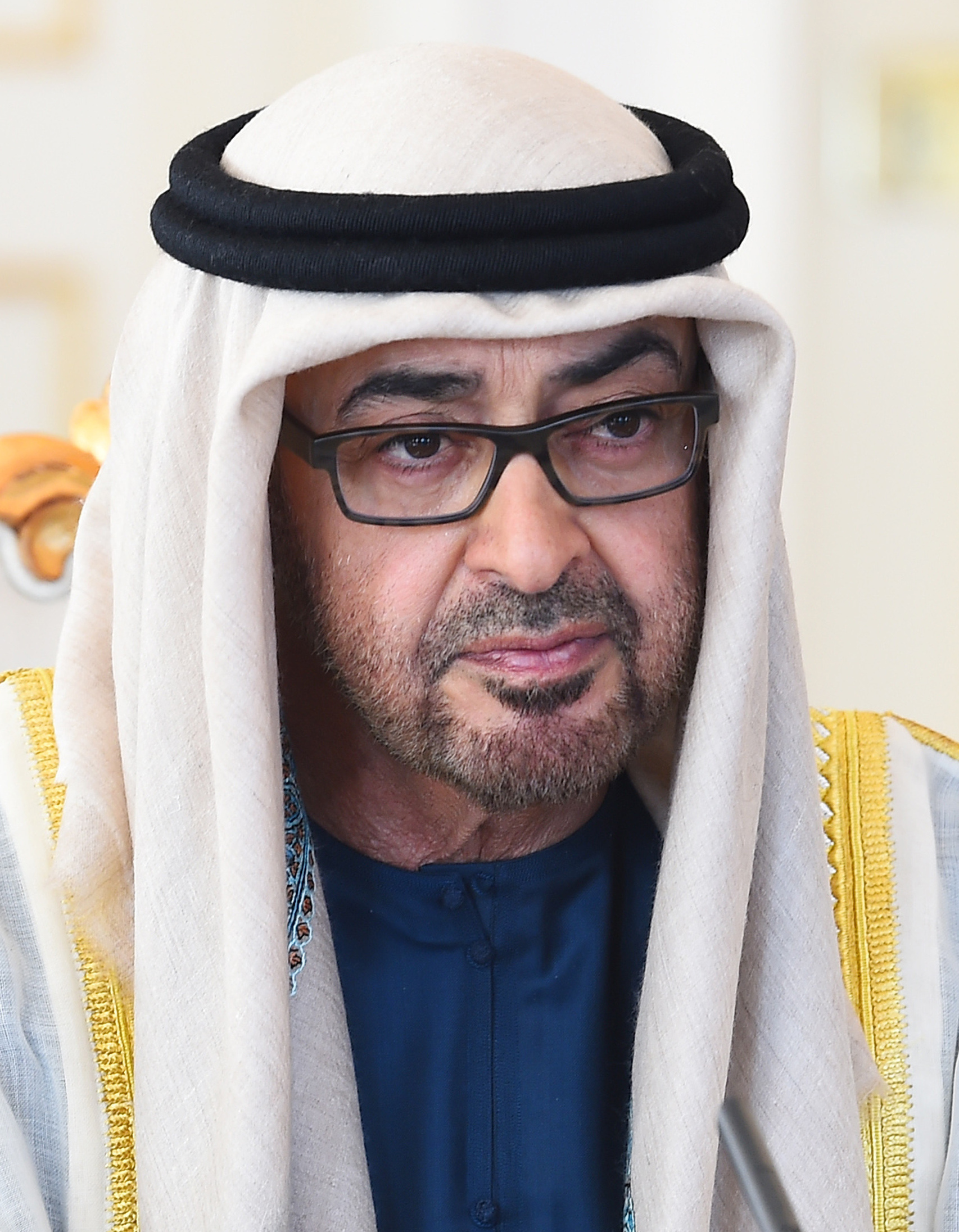
- Mohamed in 2024

3rd President of the United Arab Emirates
- Incumbent
- Assumed office 14 May 2022
- Prime Minister: Mohammed bin Rashid Al Maktoum
- Vice President: Mohammed bin Rashid Al Maktoum; Mansour bin Zayed Al Nahyan
- Preceded by: Khalifa bin Zayed Al Nahyan

Ruler of Abu Dhabi
- Reign: 13 May 2022 – present
- Predecessor: Khalifa bin Zayed Al Nahyan
- Heir apparent: Khaled bin Mohamed Al Nahyan

De facto leader of the United Arab Emirates
- De facto reign: 24 January 2014–14 May 2022
- Predecessor: Khalifa bin Zayed Al Nahyan (as President of the United Arab Emirates)
- Successor: Himself (as President of the United Arab Emirates)
- Born: 11 March 1961 (age 65); Al Ain, Abu Dhabi, Trucial States
- Spouse: Salama bint Hamdan Al Nahyan (m. 1981)
- Issue more...: Sheikh Khaled
Names
- Mohamed bin Zayed bin Sultan bin Zayed bin Khalifa Al Nahyan
- House: Al Nahyan
- Father: Zayed bin Sultan Al Nahyan
- Mother: Fatima bint Mubarak Al Ketbi
- Education: Royal Military Academy Sandhurst
- Religion: Sunni Islam
- Military career
- Allegiance: United Arab Emirates
- Branch: United Arab Emirates Air Force
- Service years: 1979–present
- Commands: United Arab Emirates Armed Forces; United Arab Emirates Air Force

Mohamed bin Zayed Al Nahyan (Note: Arabic: محمد بن زايد آل نهيان, romanized: Muḥammad bin Zāyid Āl Nahyān) (born 11 March 1961), also known as MBZ or MbZ, is an Emirati politician and member of the Abu Dhabi ruling family who has served as the third president of the United Arab Emirates and the ruler of Abu Dhabi since 2022. He was the de facto leader of the United Arab Emirates from 2014 to 2022, ruling for his brother Sheikh Khalifa.

Mohamed completed his education in Abu Dhabi and Al Ain, and graduated from the Royal Military Academy Sandhurst in 1979. He joined the UAE Armed Forces, and held various posts, before becoming a pilot in the UAE Air Force; he was promoted to general in 2005.

Mohamed is the third son of Sheikh Zayed bin Sultan Al Nahyan, the first president of the UAE and 16th ruler of Abu Dhabi. Mohamed became the crown prince of Abu Dhabi in 2004, following the death of his father, when his brother, Sheikh Khalifa, became the second president of the UAE, and the ruler of Abu Dhabi. In 2014, Sheikh Khalifa suffered a stroke, and Mohamed became the de facto leader of the UAE. Following Sheikh Khalifa's death in May 2022, Mohamed became the ruler of Abu Dhabi and was elected president of the UAE by the Federal Supreme Council. In March 2023, Mohamed appointed his son Sheikh Khaled as his successor and crown prince of Abu Dhabi.

In 2019, The New York Times named Mohamed as the most powerful Arab ruler, and he was named as one of the 100 Most Influential People of 2019 by Time magazine. He is an opponent of the Muslim Brotherhood as well as of Iran and its proxies in the Middle East. Since he became de facto leader, the UAE participated in the war against ISIS in Iraq and Syria, the Syrian civil war. He also took part in the Saudi-led intervention in the Yemeni civil war, until a disagreement over Saudi Arabia's support of Al-Islah, a Yemeni party connected with the Muslim Brotherhood, while Mohammed continued to support the Southern Transitional Council. The UAE was a leading actor in the Qatar crisis, in which the UAE, Saudi Arabia, Bahrain, and other Arab countries severed diplomatic relations with Qatar, based on accusations that Qatar supports the Muslim Brotherhood and off-shoot organizations. Intervening in the Sudanese civil war, Mohamed has been the main backer of the Rapid Support Forces (RSF).

He fell out with the Obama administration over the US-Iran nuclear deal, and supported US withdrawal from the deal. Mohamed maintained a close relationship with US President Donald Trump, with reports suggesting Mohamed was pushing Trump to take a tougher stance on Iran and the Muslim Brotherhood. In 2020, the UAE, alongside Bahrain, Morocco and Sudan, signed the Abraham Accords, an agreement to normalize diplomatic relationship with Israel, brokered by Trump. The UAE has had an economic rivalry with Saudi Arabia, and opposed Saudi efforts for OPEC+ production cuts.

== Family and early life ==
Mohamed bin Zayed bin Sultan Al Nahyan was born at Oasis Hospital in Al Ain on 11 March 1961, in what was then known as the Trucial States.

He is the third son of Sheikh Zayed bin Sultan Al Nahyan, who became the founder and first president of the United Arab Emirates and the 16th ruler of Abu Dhabi, and his third wife, Sheikha Fatima bint Mubarak Al Ketbi.

Mohamed has 18 brothers: Hamdan, Hazza, Issa, Nahyan, Saif, Tahnoun, Hamed, Mansour, Falah, Theyab, Abdullah, Omar, Khalid, the late Khalifa, the late Sultan, the late Saeed, the late Nasser, and the late Ahmed. In addition to these, he has eleven sisters.

He has five younger full brothers: Hamdan, Hazza, Tahnoun, Mansour, and Abdullah. They are referred to as Bani Fatima (the sons of Fatima).

== Education ==
Mohamed attended schools in Al Ain, Abu Dhabi until the age of 18. He also spent a summer at Gordonstoun in Scotland. In his youth, his father put Izzedine Ibrahim, a respected Egyptian Islamic scholar with connections to the Muslim Brotherhood, in charge of his education.

Mohammed later joined the Royal Military Academy Sandhurst, graduating in April 1979. While there, he completed a fundamental armor course, a fundamental flying course, a parachutist course, and training on tactical planes and helicopters, including the Gazelle squadron. During his time in Sandhurst, he also met and became good friends with fellow officer cadet Abdullah of Pahang, who would later become the 16th Yang di-Pertuan Agong (King) of Malaysia.

In the 1980s, as a young military officer, he enjoyed vacationing in Tanzania.

He has held a number of roles in the UAE military, from that of an officer in the Amiri Guard (now called Presidential Guard) to a pilot in the UAE Air Force.

== Political career ==
=== Crown Prince of Abu Dhabi ===
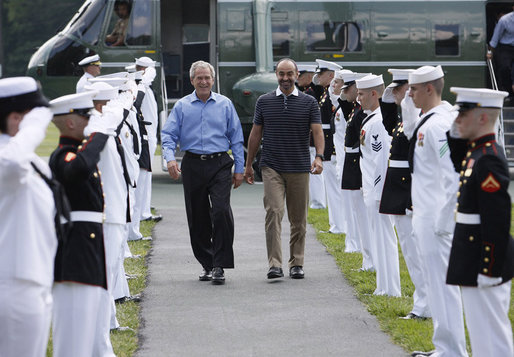
Mohamed and U.S. president George W. Bush at Camp David

In November 2003, Sheikh Zayed appointed his son Mohamed as deputy crown prince of Abu Dhabi. Upon the death of his father, Mohamed became crown prince of Abu Dhabi in November 2004 and was appointed deputy supreme commander of the UAE Armed Forces in January 2005. Later that month, he was promoted to the rank of general. Since December 2004 he has also been the chairman of the Abu Dhabi Executive Council, which is responsible for the development and planning of the Emirate of Abu Dhabi and is a member of the Supreme Petroleum Council. He also served as a special adviser to his older half-brother, Khalifa bin Zayed, president of the UAE at the time.

As a result of Sheikh Khalifa's ill health, Mohamed became the de facto ruler of Abu Dhabi in January 2014 and was responsible for welcoming foreign dignitaries in the capital district of the United Arab Emirates in the city of Abu Dhabi. On 13 May 2022, he became the ruler of Abu Dhabi, following the death of his brother Khalifa. On 14 May 2022, he was elected as president of the United Arab Emirates.

=== Foreign policy ===
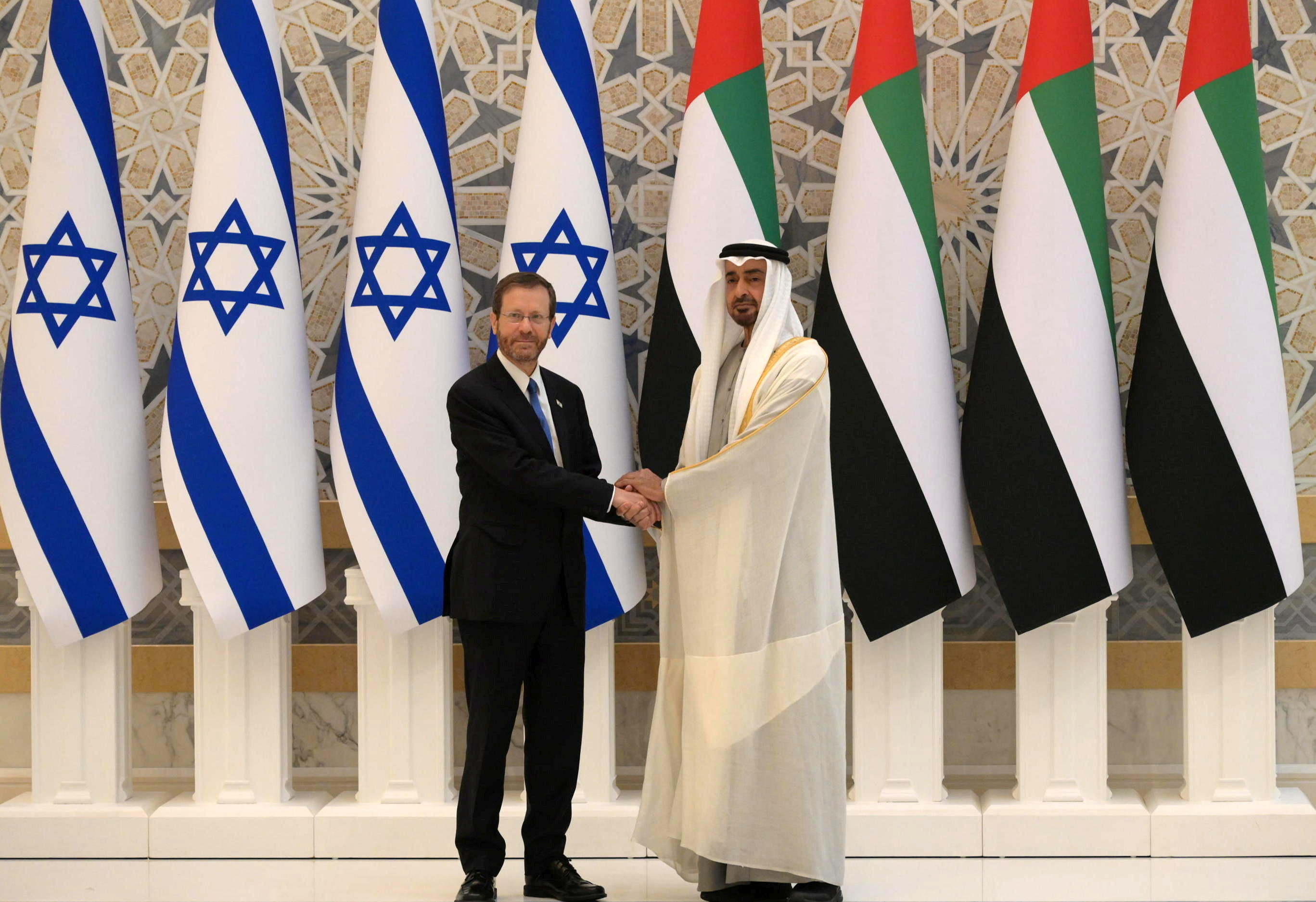
Israeli president Isaac Herzog meets Mohamed during his official visit to the United Arab Emirates, 30 January 2022

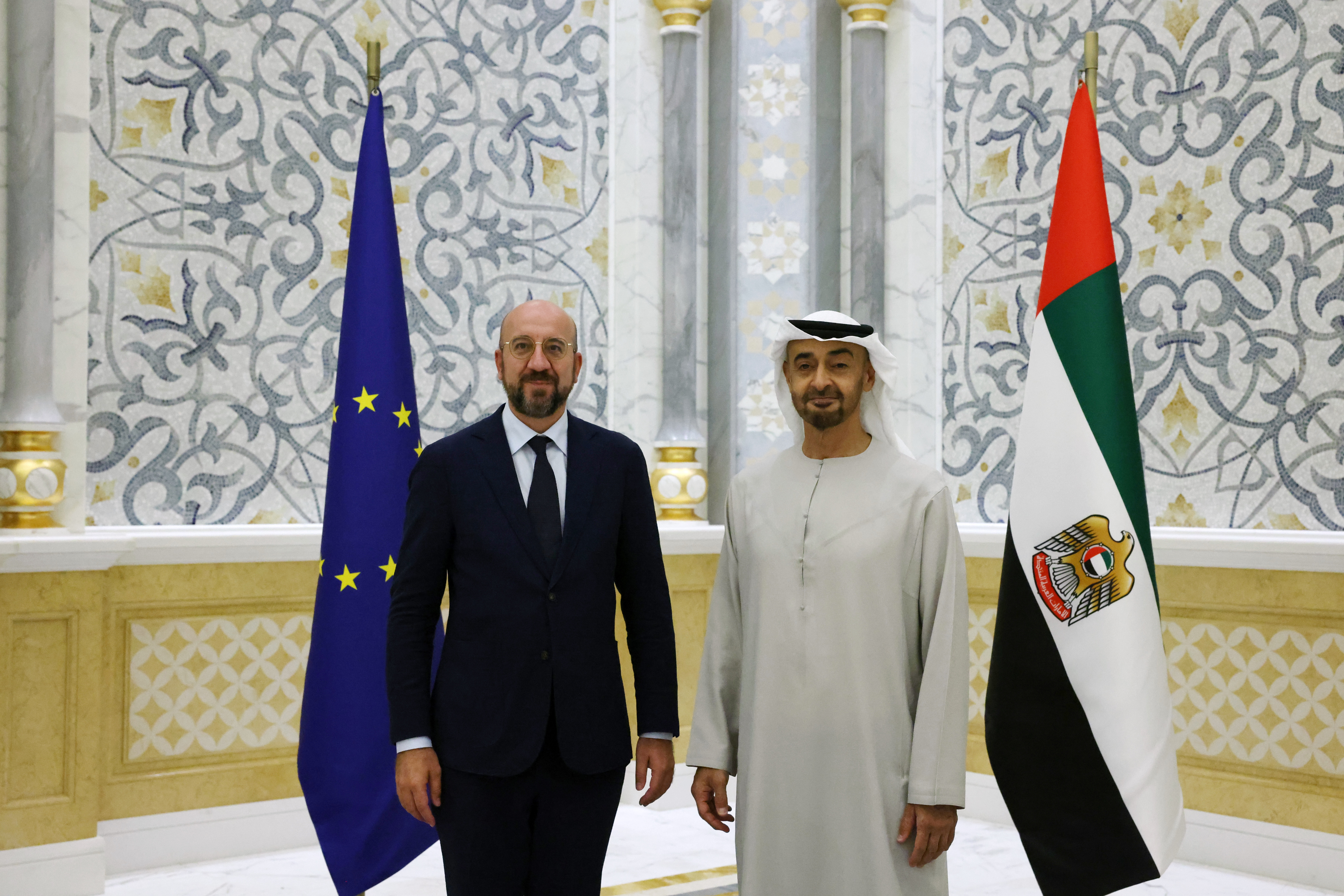
Mohamed meets with President of the European Council Charles Michel on 8 September 2022

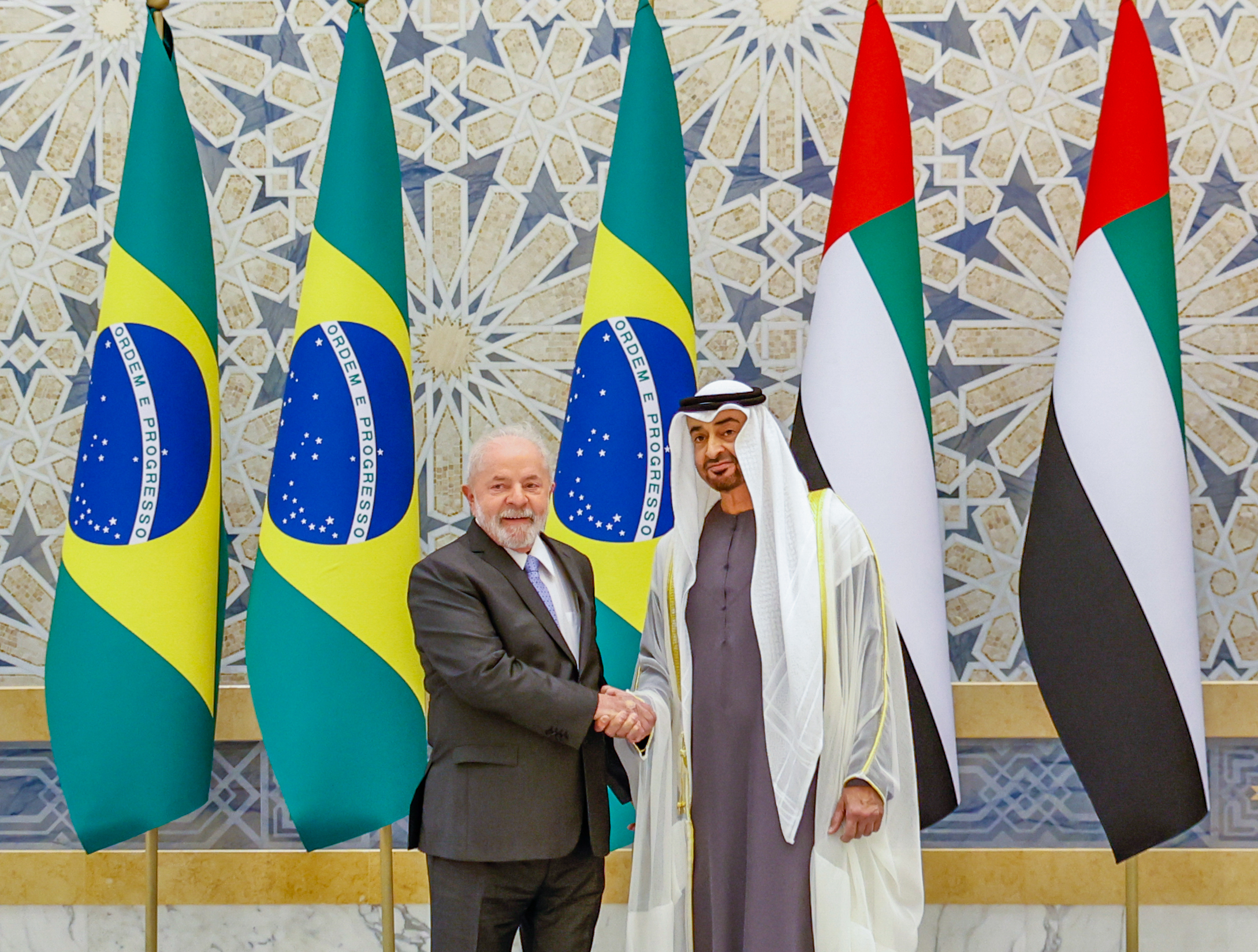
Mohamed meets with Brazilian president Luiz Inácio Lula da Silva in Abu Dhabi, 15 April 2023

In 2018, Mohamed travelled to Ethiopia to meet Prime Minister Abiy Ahmed, ahead of the first installment of a $3 billion donation from the UAE to Ethiopia, intended to tide over its foreign exchange shortage. Under Mohamed's encouragement and initiative, the UAE raised funds to provide aid to Somalia during periods of drought.

Mohamed is a supporter of Yemen's internationally recognized government, after the Yemen civil war, and supported the Saudi-led intervention in Yemen to drive out Irani-backed Houthi militants after the Houthi takeover in Yemen. During Mohamed's visit to France in 2018, a group of rights activists filed a lawsuit against the crown prince, accusing him of being a "war criminal" who was "complicit in the torture and inhumane treatment in Yemen". The complaint filed on behalf of the French rights group AIDL said: "It is in this capacity that he has ordered bombings on Yemeni territory."

Mohamed's foreign policy was characterized by supporting secessionist movements and fueling fragmentation across various countries in the MENA (Middle East and North Africa) region. A result of his opposition to the 2011 Arab Spring uprisings, this approach assists the UAE's plans to avoid external threat, silence dissent, exercise influence and secure its interests. MbZ has actively encouraged factions that undermine central governments, including Khalifa Haftar in Libya, the Southern Movement in Yemen, and Hemedti in Sudan, rather than backing the unified states.

==== United States ====
Mohamed regards the United States as his chief ally and has a strong relationship with United States government officials including former US Secretary of Defense Jim Mattis and former US national security advisor and counter-terrorism expert Richard A. Clarke. As unpaid advisers, Mohamed consults them and follows their advice on combating terrorism and enhancing the UAE's military strength and intelligence. Mohamed had an initially good relationship with the Obama administration but the relationship deteriorated when Barack Obama did not consult with or inform the UAE about its Iran nuclear deal. A further breakdown in relations was caused over their different positions on the Syrian civil war. According to an Emirati senior adviser, "His Highness felt that the UAE had made sacrifices and then been excluded." However, Mohamed continued talking to Obama regularly and offered him advice. Mohamed warned Obama that his proposed remedy for Syria — the Free Syrian Army rebels who were allied to Al-Qaeda and the Muslim Brotherhood — would be worse than the regime of Bashar al-Assad. He also urged Obama to talk to the Russians about working together on Syria, and supported the Russian intervention in the Syrian civil war. The relationship deteriorated further when Obama made dismissive comments in a 2016 interview in The Atlantic, describing the gulf's rulers as "free riders" who "do not have the ability to put out the flames on their own". After the election of Donald Trump, Mohamed flew to New York to meet the president-elect's team and canceled a parting lunch with Obama.

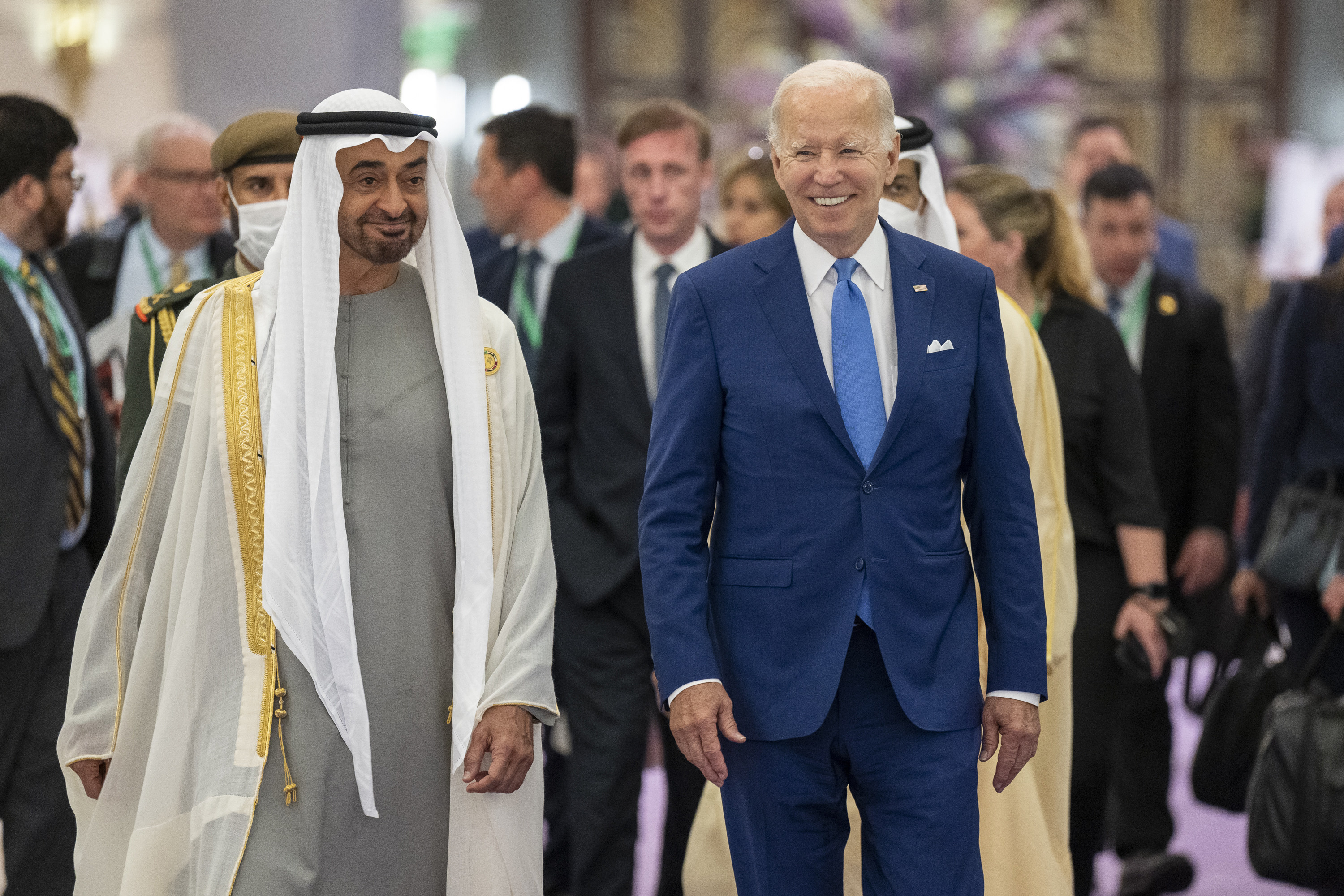
Mohamed with U.S. president Joe Biden at the GCC+3 summit in Jeddah, Saudi Arabia, 16 July 2022

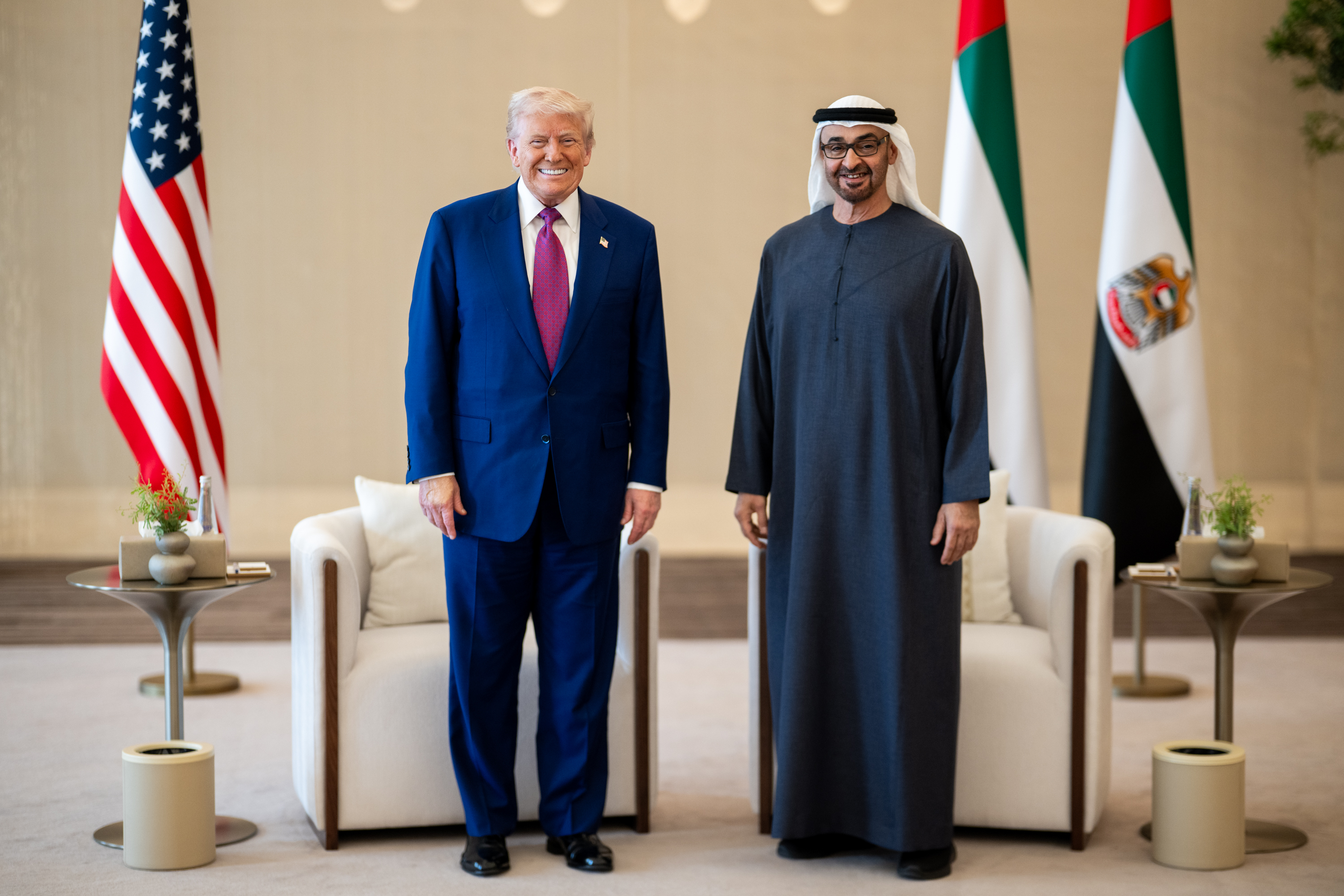
Mohamed and U.S. president Donald Trump in Abu Dhabi during Donald Trump's visit to the Middle East, May 2025

Mohamed shared similar ideas with President Trump regarding Iran and the Muslim Brotherhood, as Trump has sought to move strongly against both. When Mohamed was a child, his father Sheikh Zayed unknowingly assigned a respected Muslim Brotherhood member, Ezzedine Ibrahim, as Mohamed's tutor. His tutor attempted an indoctrination that backfired. "I am an Arab, I am a Muslim and I pray. And in the 1970s and early 1980s I was one of them," Mohamed told visiting American diplomats in 2007 to explain his distrust of the Muslim Brotherhood, as they reported in a classified cable released by WikiLeaks. He stated, "I strongly believe these guys have an agenda." Trump also shared Mohamed's views on Qatar, Libya and Saudi Arabia, even over the advice of cabinet officials and senior national security staff. In August 2020, Trump, Israeli Prime Minister Benjamin Netanyahu and Sheikh Mohamed jointly announced the establishment of formal Israeli–Emirati relations.

After the Russian invasion of Ukraine in 2022, The Wall Street Journal reported that Al Nahyan refused to take phone calls with US President Joe Biden (at a time when Biden was asking for greater oil production from Saudi Arabia and the UAE) due to his criticism of Biden's policy in the Gulf.

In September 2024, Mohamed bin Zayed visited the United States, the first ever visit of an Emirati President to the White House. Mohamed met President Joe Biden and Vice President Kamala Harris separately, discussing future bilateral economic and technological relations. Ahead of Mohamed's visit to Washington, certain US lawmakers also sent a letter to Biden, asking him to discuss with Mohamed the ongoing crisis in Sudan, and stating that the UAE's backing of the Rapid Support Forces (RSF) in Sudan could hinder Biden's efforts to end the conflict.

==== United Kingdom ====
In 2024, British Prime Minister Keir Starmer and Sheikh Mohamed significantly deepened bilateral relations through direct meetings and high-level diplomatic engagement. In December 2024, Starmer conducted a high-profile visit to the United Arab Emirates and Saudi Arabia to accelerate negotiations for a Free Trade Agreement with the Gulf Cooperation Council.

In late 2025, Starmer's government faced intensifying parliamentary and public pressure to suspend arms sales to the UAE following reports that British-made military equipment was being diverted to the Rapid Support Forces (RSF) in Sudan.

==== Egypt ====
On 22 March 2022, Sheikh Mohamed met with Abdel Fattah el-Sisi and Israeli Prime Minister Naftali Bennett in Egypt. They discussed trilateral relations, Russo-Ukrainian War and the Iran nuclear deal.

==== Russia ====
Mohamed maintains a strong relationship with Russia and Vladimir Putin, and has brokered talks between Russia and the Trump administration. In 2016, Mohamed was found involved in the Russian meddling of the US presidential elections, where his adviser George Nader arranged a meeting for him and Saudi Crown Prince Mohammed bin Salman in Seychelles with US and Russian delegates, including Erik Prince and Kirill Dmitriev. Mohamed was named in the final report of special counsel Robert Mueller on the alleged collusion between Trump campaign and Russia, which the investigation later concluded that there was no collusion between the meeting that occurred with Mohamed. Mohamed's strong relationship with both Russia and the United States, as well as the influence he wields across both countries, has led The New York Times to label him as the Arab World's "most powerful ruler".

Putin calls Mohamed an "old friend" and "a big friend of our country, a big friend of Russia". The two leaders talk with each other on the phone regularly. In an official state visit to the Emirates, Putin gifted Mohamed a Russian gyrfalcon. The UAE also trained the first two Emirati astronauts Hazza Al Mansouri and Sultan Al Neyadi, and successfully launched the first Emirati and Arab astronaut Hazza Al Mansouri to the International Space Station with Russian help.

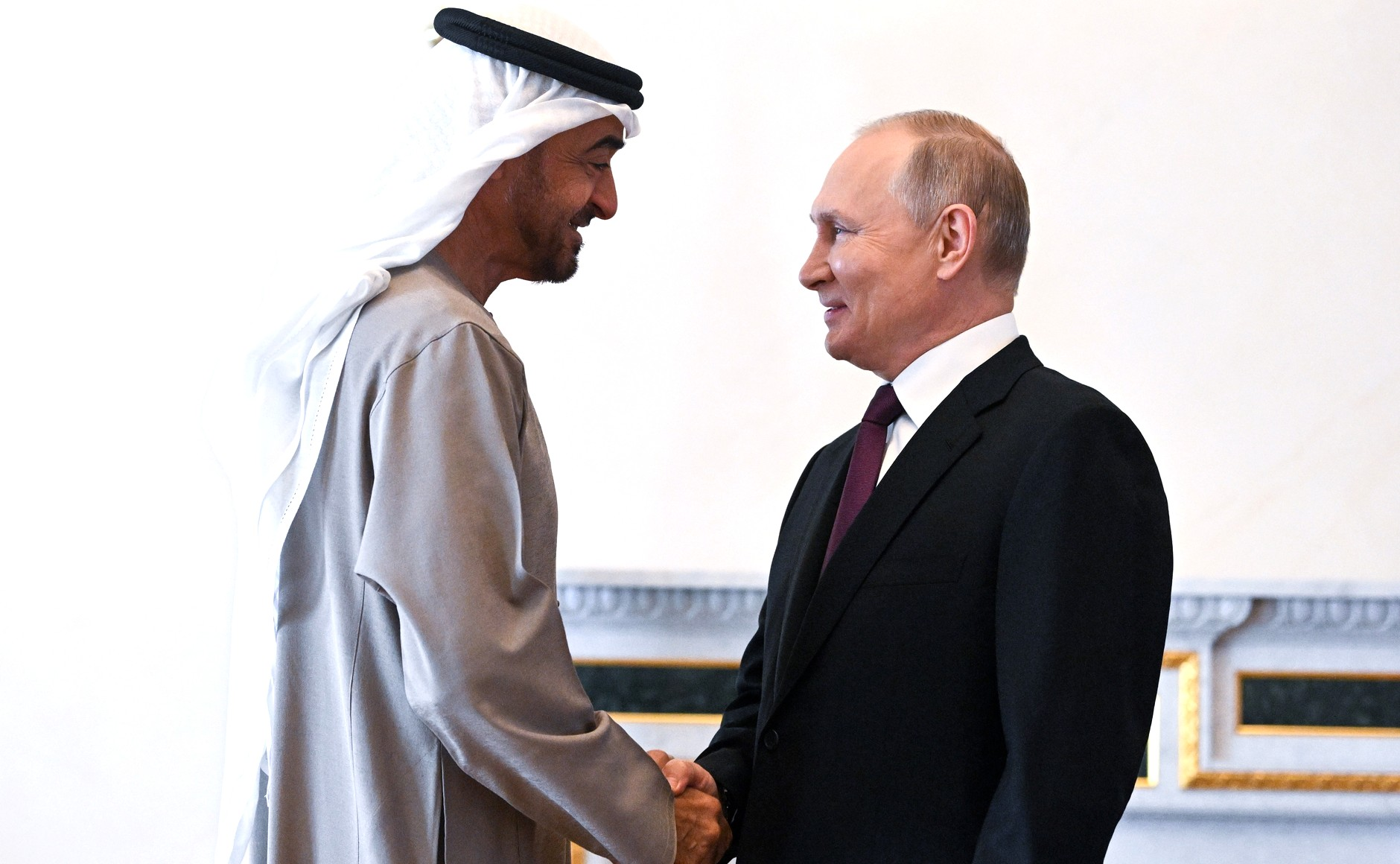
Russian president Vladimir Putin meeting with Sheikh Mohamed in Saint Petersburg on 11 October 2022.

On 11 October 2022, Sheikh Mohamed met with Putin in Saint Petersburg, days after OPEC+ cut oil production.

In June 2023, Sheikh Mohamed met Putin at the St. Petersburg International Economic Forum (SPIEF), and said the Emirates wished to strengthen ties with Russia. Mohamed became the most prominent attendee, as the UAE was a special guest country at the event. Several major US and European politicians and investors used to attend the forum before the Russian invasion of Ukraine, but the Western nations remained absent from the event in 2023. MbZ's diplomatic adviser, Anwar Gargash said it was a "calculated risk" that the UAE was willing to take for de-escalation in an increasingly polarized world. The UAE was, however, criticized for supporting Russia's war in Ukraine, where the Emirates also became a mediator in sending Chinese weapons to Russia.

==== Turkey ====
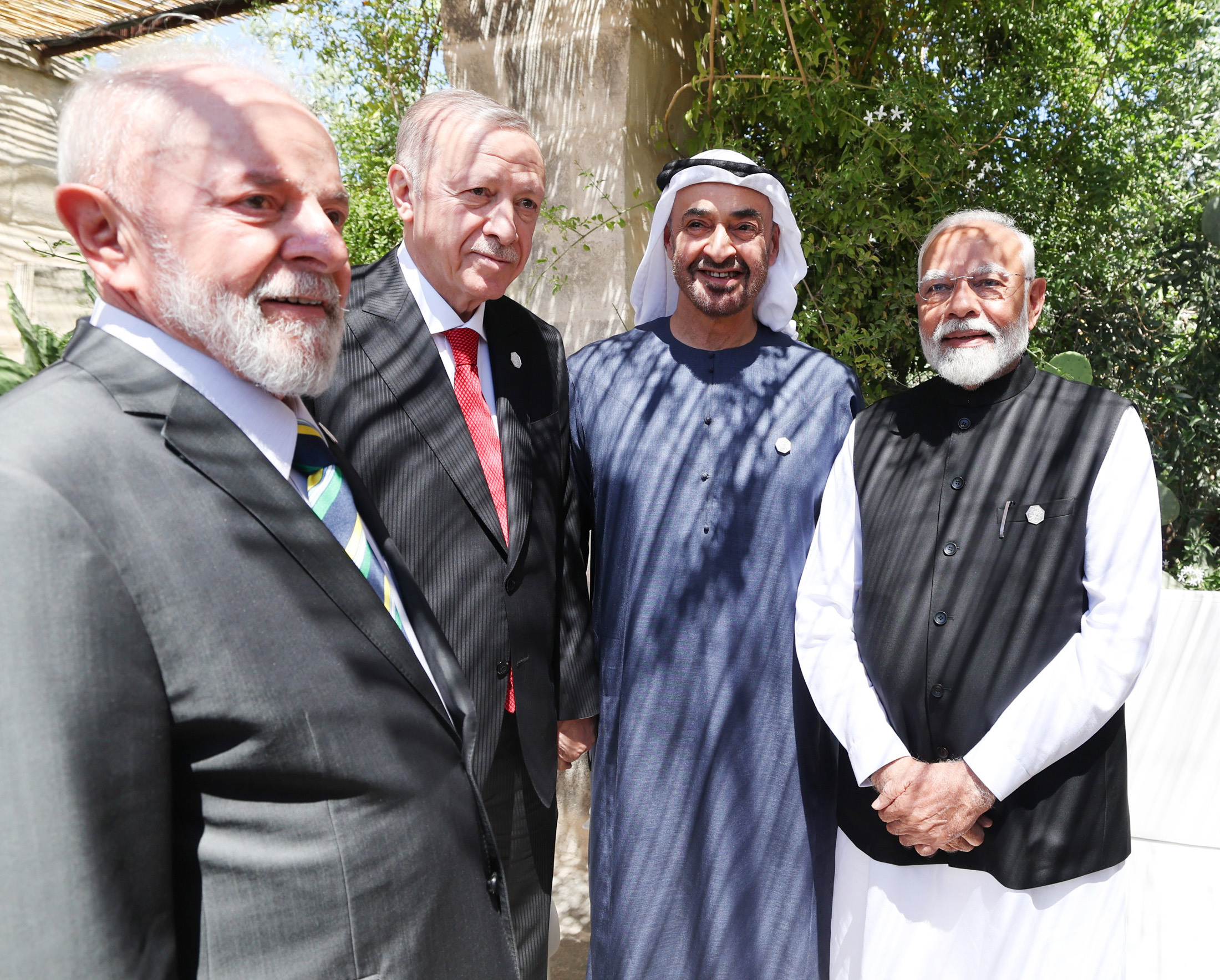
Mohamed with Turkish president Recep Tayyip Erdoğan and Indian prime minister Narendra Modi at the G7 Summit in Italy, 14 June 2024

In August 2021, Mohamed held talks with Turkish president Recep Tayyip Erdoğan to discuss reinforcing relations between their two countries. This came after years of each state supporting opposing sides in regional conflicts, such as that in Libya. Relations started to improve between the two regional rivals – the United Arab Emirates and Turkey – following the fall of Afghanistan to the Taliban and the withdrawal of the US troops.

==== Africa ====
The Emirates’ policy in Africa majorly involved three categories– Commercial, strategic and financial role. Under Mohamed's leadership, the Emirates’ total investments into Africa increased to $110bn, as China was cutting down loans to the continent. In 2022 and 2023, the Emirates also pledged investments worth $97bn across ports, renewable energy, mining, agriculture, real estate, communications and manufacturing in Africa. In a decade, the UAE maintained a position amongst the top 4 investors of Africa. The Emirati influence in Africa has also been on the rise. Even though Dubai denied to extradite Gupta brothers, who were accused of looting South Africa by the authorities, Mohamed was welcomed in the state. Mohamed also donated around $1mn to upgrade a runway of an airport in the Eastern Cape province. In April 2023, Mohamed, his family and friends, traveled to Eastern Cape to stay at his private resort to celebrate Eid. The UAE's presence was also seen in wars, including in Libya, Ethiopia and Sudan. In Ethiopia, the Emirates provided military support to the government in the war against the forces from Tigray. In 2019 and 2020, the UAE's actions in the Libya war were controversial, where it supported the Libyan warlord, Khalifa Haftar. In Sudan, the UAE was accused of fueling the war by supporting Hemedti’s Rapid Support Forces, which the Emirates has repeatedly denied. African leaders increasingly welcomed investments from the UAE, which offered a financial boost to Africa's green energy sector. Between 2019 and 2023, Emirati investments in renewable energy amounted to $72 billion. However, the UAE's rising climate finance commitments in Africa were questioned by activists and analysts. They raised concerns around the UAE's rights records, treatment of migrant workers, support for hydrocarbons, and its failure to address environmental issues.

===== Sudan =====
During the Sudanese civil war that broke out in 2023 between the Sudanese Armed Forces and its former paramilitary wing, the Rapid Support Forces (RSF), the UAE covertly provided arms to the RSF, which has perpetrated massive crimes against humanity in Sudan, including large-scale sexual violence, indiscriminate killings, and ethnic cleansing. The UAE used the cover of humanitarian relief efforts under Red Crescent auspices to ship the weapons to RSF, including powerful drones, howitzers, multiple rocket launchers, and antiaircraft missiles, and is regarded as the most important foreign ally of RSF and its head Mohamed Hamdan Dagalo (known as Hemeti). Although the UAE officially denies arming any of the combatants in the Sudan conflict, Emirati officials reportedly made an implicit acknowledgement of the country's support for Hemeti after being confronted by U.S. officials. Groups such as Refugees International have criticized MBZ for his support for the RSF.

=== Nuclear energy and international cooperation ===
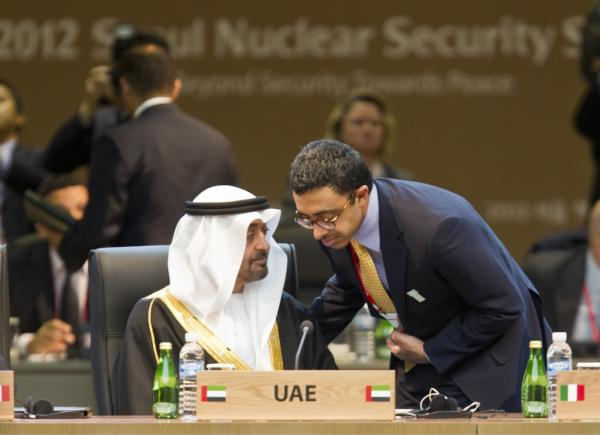
Mohamed representing the United Arab Emirates in the 2012 Nuclear Security Summit

Under Mohamed, the UAE built the Barakah nuclear power plant, which is the first nuclear power plant in the Arabian Peninsula. The UAE and US signed a bilateral agreement for peaceful nuclear cooperation that enhances international standards of nuclear non-proliferation. Mohamed attended the Nuclear Security Summits of 2012 and 2014, hosted by South Korea and the Netherlands respectively.

=== Religion and foreign relations ===
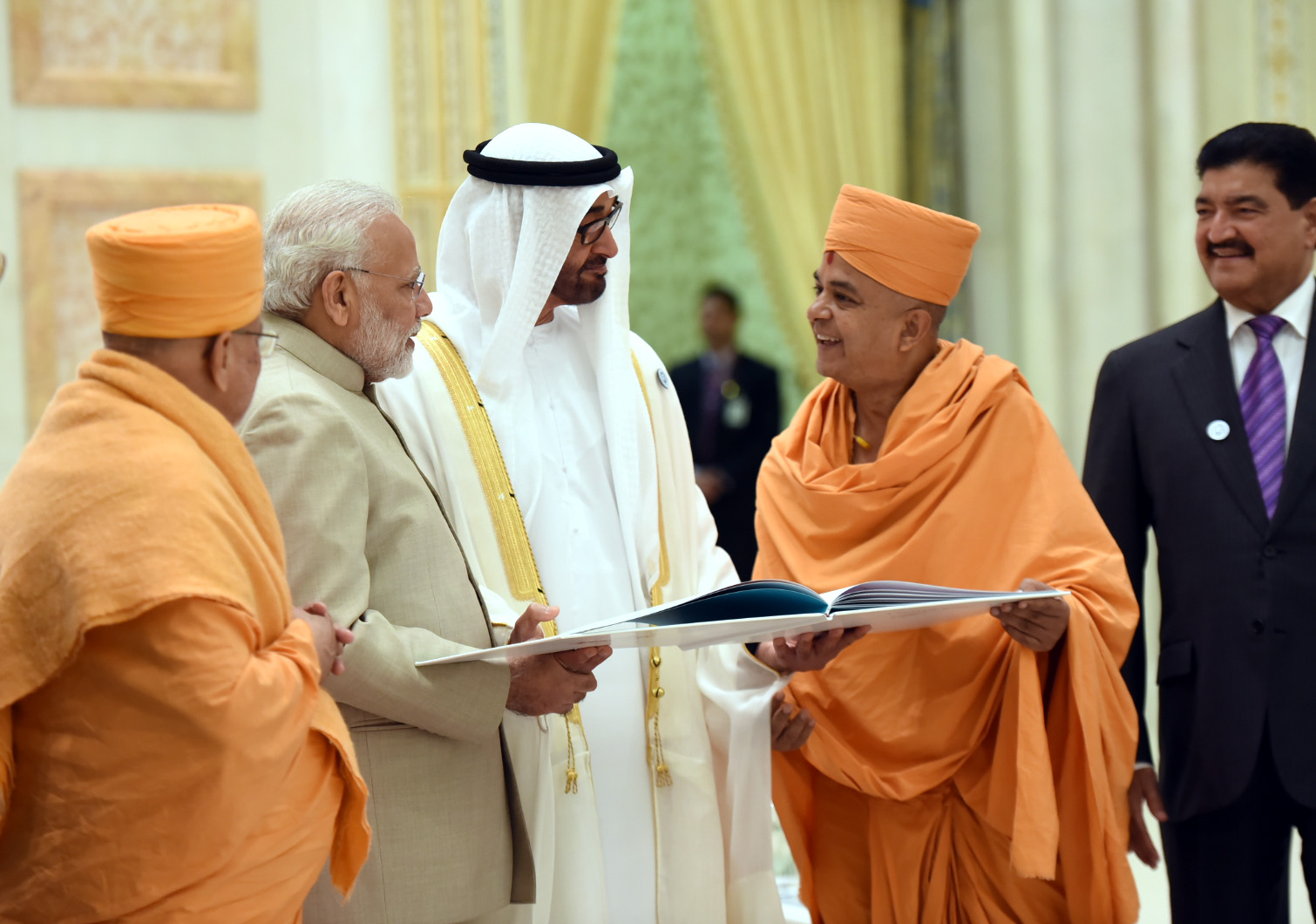
The BAPS present Hindu literature to Sheikh Mohamed and Indian Prime Minister Narendra Modi, Abu Dhabi. At the rightmost corner is B. R. Shetty.

Islam is the official religion of the UAE, and there are laws against blasphemy, proselytizing by non-Muslims, and conversions away from Islam. The constitution of the UAE guarantees freedom of worship, unless it contradicts "public policy or morals". The UAE government tightly controls, and monitors, Muslim practices. A government permit is required to hold a Quran lecture, or distribute content related to Islam, in an effort to combat decentralized preaching from Islamist groups. All imams must receive their salaries from the UAE government.

Mohamed visited Pope Francis in 2016, and in February 2019, he welcomed Francis to the UAE, marking the first papal visit to the Arabian Peninsula. Pope Francis's arrival coincided with a conference entitled "Global Conference of Human Fraternity". The conference featured talks and workshops about how to foster religious tolerance. As part of this visit, Pope Francis held the first Papal Mass to be celebrated in the Arabian Peninsula, at Zayed Sports City, in which 180,000 worshippers from 100 countries, including 4,000 Muslims, were present.

Over the course of the last years, the UAE has seen the rise of the Indian population and Hindu advocacy. The government has allowed the building of several privately funded Hindu temples and the screening of the film The Kashmir Files.

== Domestic policy ==
=== Authoritarianism ===
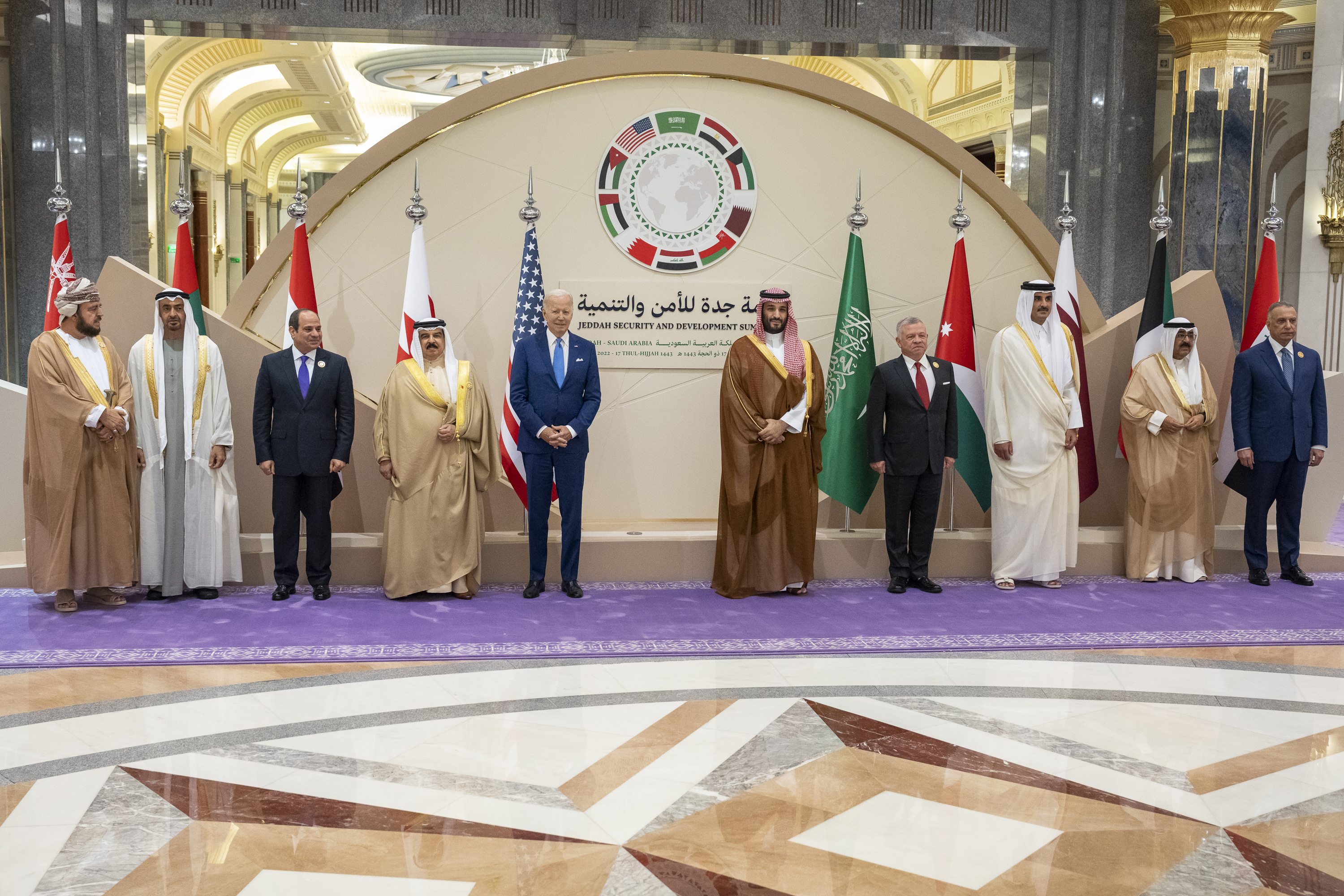
Mohamed bin Zayed and other autocratic Arab leaders at the GCC+3 summit in Jeddah, 16 July 2022

Political scientists have characterized Mohamed bin Zayed as the strongman leader of an authoritarian regime, as there are no free and fair elections, political and civil rights are limited, free speech is restricted, and there are no free and independent media. According to the human rights organizations Amnesty International and Human Rights Watch, the UAE practices torture, arbitrary detention, and forced disappearance of citizens and residents.

Political scientist Christopher Davidson has characterized Mohamed's tenure as de facto UAE leader as entailing "a marked and rapid intensification of autocratic-authoritarianism." Democracy indicators show "recent and substantial efforts to tighten up almost all remaining political and civic freedoms." According to Andreas Krieg, Mohamed's political ideology holds that strongman authoritarianism is the optimal governance system for the UAE. Krieg writes:

"MbZ envisaged the creation of a new Middle Eastern state... Statecraft would be the prerogative of the autocratic, centralized ruler whose transactional relationship with his subordinates was supposed to be governed by both means of accommodation and repression. The ideal strongman, from MbZ's point of view, was in control of the security sector, both military and law enforcement, and governed over a society emancipated from religious conservatism and empowered by capitalist market structures... Abu Dhabi's paranoia over political dissidence was further fueled by the developments of the Arab Spring to which MbZ internally reacted by further curtailing the freedom of speech, thought and assembly in the country... MbZ's fierce state has moved against any civil society activism in the country outside state control."

=== Economic policy ===
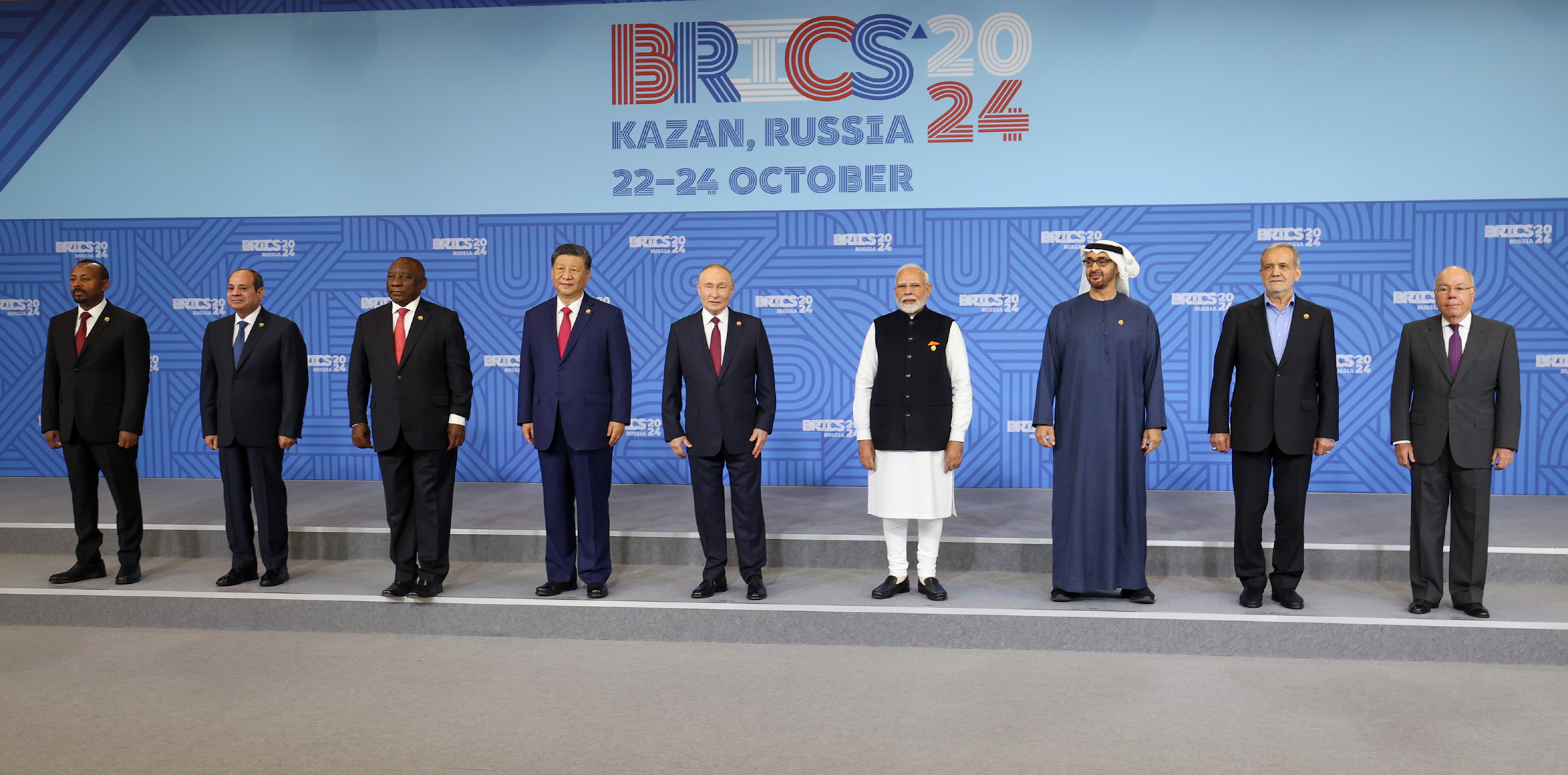
Mohamed bin Zayed at the 16th BRICS summit in Kazan, Russia, 23 October 2024

Scholars have also characterized the UAE under Mohamed bin Zayed's regime as a rentier state.

He previously served as the head of Abu Dhabi Council for Economic Development (ADCED), Abu Dhabi Investment Authority (ADIA), Mubadala Development Company, Tawazun Economic Council, and Abu Dhabi Department of Education and Knowledge.

According to The Intercept and referencing the hacked emails of Yousef Al Otiaba, an American citizen Khaled Hassen received $10 million in 2013 for an alleged torture settlement after a lawsuit presented in the federal court in Los Angeles against three senior Abu Dhabi royals, including Mohamed bin Zayed.

In June 2018, Mohamed approved a three-year AED 50 billion economic stimulus package. He also commissioned a review of building regulations in an effort to galvanize urban development.

Mohamed is chairman of the Supreme Council for Financial and Economic Affairs. The council is the primary governing body of Abu Dhabi's financial, investment, economic, petroleum and natural resources affairs. He also chairs the Abu Dhabi National Oil Company.

== Military ==
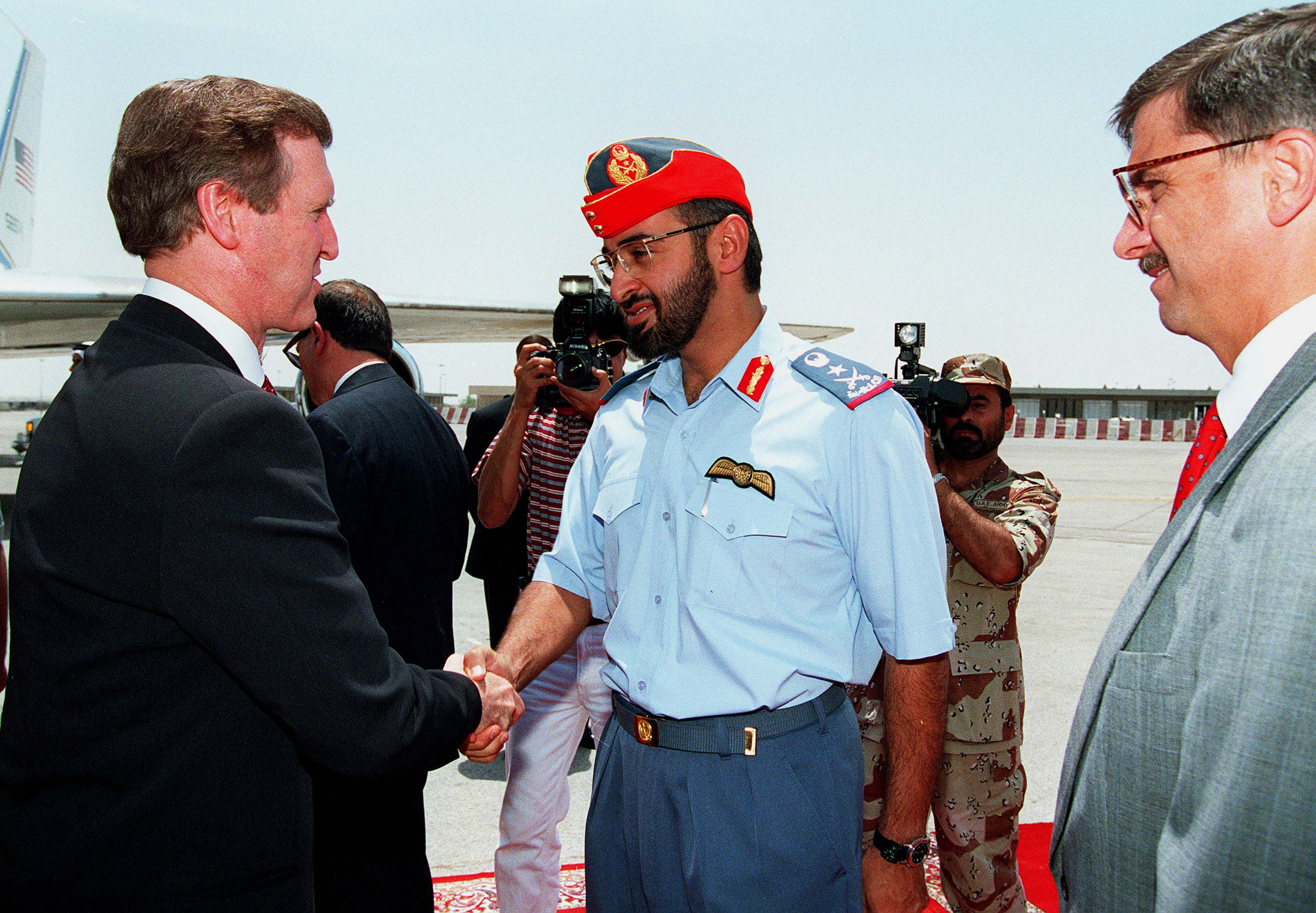
Mohamed as Chief of Staff in his air force military uniform greeting then U.S. Secretary of Defense William S. Cohen in Abu Dhabi, 1997

Mohamed served as an officer in the Amiri Guard (now known as Presidential Guard), as a pilot in the UAE's Air Force, as commander of the UAE Air Force and Air Defense, and as deputy chief of staff of the Armed Forces. In 2005, he was appointed deputy supreme commander of the UAE Armed Forces and was accordingly promoted to lieutenant general.

In the early 1990s, Mohamed told Richard Clarke, then an assistant secretary of state, that he wanted to buy the F-16 fighter jet. Clarke replied that he must mean the F-16A, the model the Pentagon sold to American allies. Mohamed said that instead he wanted a newer model he had read about in Aviation Week, with an advanced radar-and-weapons system. Clarke told him that that model did not exist yet; the military had not done the necessary research and development. Mohamed said the UAE would pay for the research and development. The subsequent negotiations went on for years, and according to Clarke "he ended up with a better F-16 than the US Air Force had".

Mohamed made jujitsu compulsory in schools. In 2014, he established the military draft, conscripting young Emiratis to attend a year of boot camp, initially running a pilot project within his own family and making his own daughters run as the sample size by making them attend boot camp. He invited Maj. Gen. Mike Hindmarsh, the retired former head of Australia's Special Operations Command, to help reorganize the Emirati military. According to the New York Times, as a result of Mohamed's vision, the United Arab Emirates Armed Forces became the best equipped and trained military in the region apart from Israel. Under Mohamed's leadership, the United Arab Emirates Armed Forces also became commonly nicknamed as "Little Sparta" by United States Armed Forces General and former US defense secretary James Mattis as a result of their active and effective military role despite their small active personnel.

According to a 2020 study, Mohamed's reforms successfully increased the effectiveness of the UAE military.

== Controversies ==
On 17 July 2020, a French investigating magistrate was appointed to carry out the probe targeting Mohamed bin Zayed for "complicity in the use of torture", citing the UAE's involvement in the Yemen civil war. One of the two complaints was filed with the constitution of civil party by six Yemenis, who claimed to have been tortured, electrocuted and burned by cigarettes in Yemeni detention centres controlled by the UAE armed forces. A report by United Nations experts highlighted that the attacks of the Saudi-led coalition, of which the UAE is a member, may have constituted war crimes, and that the Emirati forces controlled two centres where torture has been carried out.

Following the 2018 French probe into the torture claims, France's top criminal court, the Court of Cassation, rejected in November 2022 attempts to reopen the investigation and rule that there were "no grounds to accept an appeal." In October 2021, Mohamed's name was featured alongside four other Emirati officials in an indictment of Thomas J. Barrack, former adviser of Donald Trump. In July 2021, Barrack was arrested by the American authorities for allegedly failing to register as a foreign lobbyist for the UAE, obstructing justice and lying to investigators. Later, his seven-count indictment identified names of three Emirati royals, who were hosts at Barrack's reception in December 2016. It included Mohamed bin Zayed, Tahnoun bin Zayed and director of the Emirati intelligence service, Ali Mohammed Hammad Al Shamsi. Two other UAE officials named in the indictment were Abdullah Khalifa Al Ghafli and Yousef Al Otaiba. Together, the officials were accused of giving Barrack the task to push the Emirati interests with the US. In 2022, Barrack was found not guilty on all charges.

On 17 July 2022, Mohamed visited France to meet President Emmanuel Macron. It was his first foreign travel since becoming the UAE president. However, a group of human rights organizations, including International Federation for Human Rights (FIDH), the Gulf Center for Human Rights (GCHR), and the Ligue des droits de l'Homme, wrote an open letter to President Macron, highlighting the human rights situation in the UAE. Drawing attention to the repressive dictatorship practiced in the Emirates, they urged Macron to raise the issue of severe human rights violations in the UAE with Mohamed during the meeting. The letter also asked Macron to end the arms supply to the UAE, in wake of the Yemen war.

In 2023, The New Yorker reported that Mohamed was paying millions of euros to a Swiss-based private investigation firm, Alp Services, for orchestrating a smear campaign against its targets, including Qatar and the Muslim Brotherhood. As part of this campaign, Alp posted false and defamatory Wikipedia entries, and published propaganda articles against the targets. Multiple meetings took place between the Alp Services head, Mario Brero, and an Emirati official, Matar Humaid Al Neyadi. However, Alp's bills were sent directly to MbZ. The defamation campaign also targeted an American, Hazim Nada, and his firm, Lord Energy, who is the son of the Muslim Brotherhood's long-time financier Youssef Nada and founder of Al Taqwa Bank which was formerly placed on the UN terror list by the US Treasury Department for allegedly financing Al-Qaeda. Nada had approached a former security official close to MbZ, Abdul Rehman al-Blouki, in hope of a financial settlement. However, Blouki warned him to not threaten the Emirates. The information was acquired through confidential documents obtained through a hack into Alp Services. An investigation, termed Abu Dhabi Secrets, was run into the documents. It further revealed that Mario Brero provided the UAE with a list of over 1,000 individuals and 400 organizations in Europe, including over 200 individuals and 120 organizations in France, who were falsely linked to radical Islam. A lawsuit against George Washington University, its Program on Extremism and Lorenzo Vidino revealed their involvement in rumors about an Austria-based academic researcher, Farid Hafez. He was targeted by the “Operation Luxor”, which included raids and asset seizures. The suit, which was a part of the New Yorker investigation, stated that Vidino acknowledged the UAE financed the operation through Alp Services.

A report by The Athletic referred to the 2020 unpublished judgement of the UEFA’s Club Financial Control Board (CFCB) as it disclosed that Mohamed bin Zayed's former key senior aide, Jaber Mohamed, facilitated sponsorship payments to the Emirati-owned Manchester City F.C. The payments made through Etisalat were disguised as equity funding and were under the Premier League's investigation over breach of UEFA's financial rules. Between 2005 and 2022, Jaber Mohamed served as the General Director of the Abu Dhabi Crown Prince's Court (CPC), which takes care of MbZ's public affairs. Another senior most aide to Sheikh Mohamed at the CPC, Mohamed Al Mazrouei, was also on Man City's board during the club's FFP violations. Citing the involvement of CPC, experts questioned whether MbZ was aware of the sponsorship payments and to what extent.

== Philanthropy ==
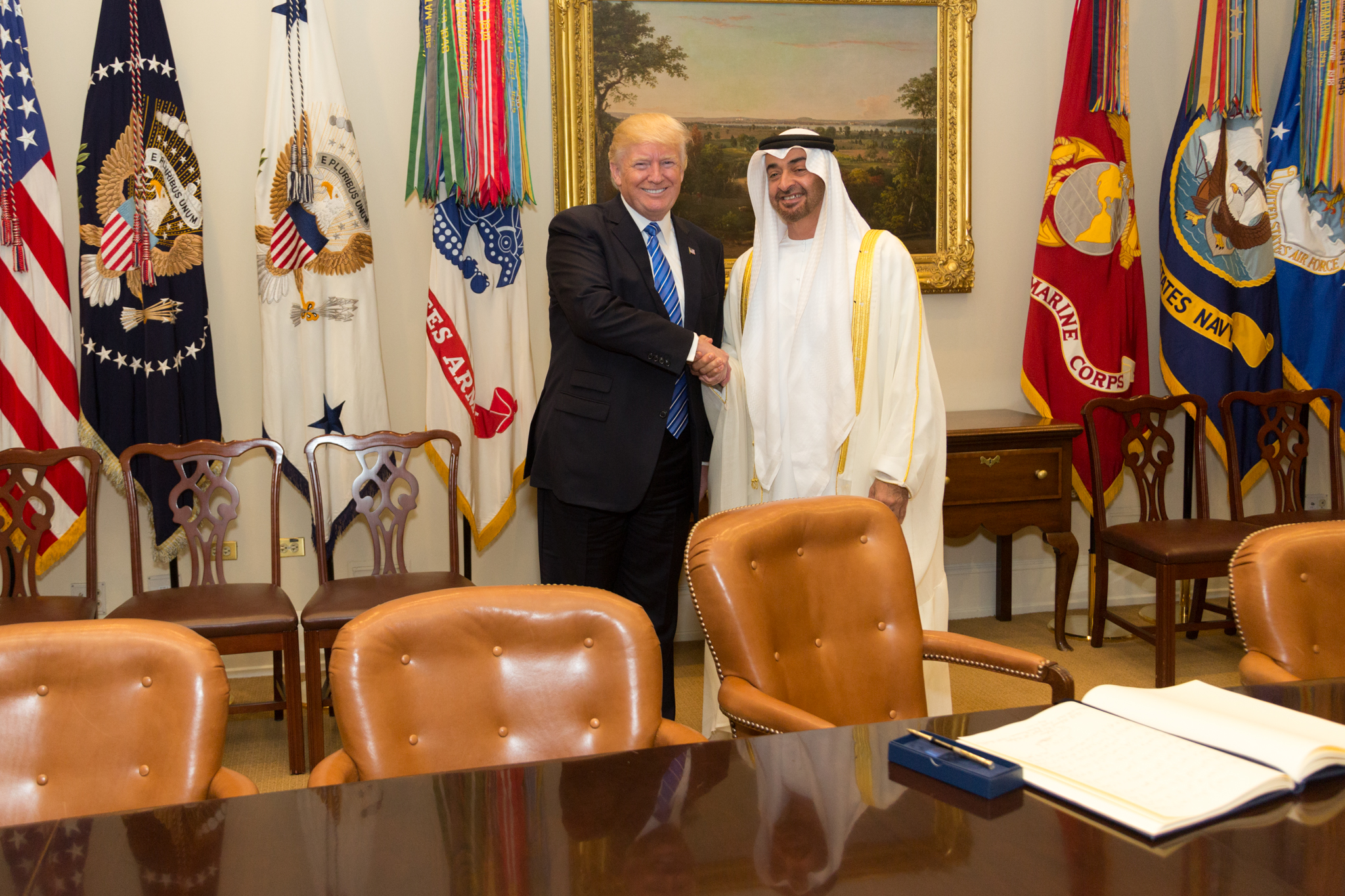
Mohamed with U.S. President Donald Trump in Washington, D.C., May 2017

Mohamed has gifted AED 55 million to the UN Global Initiative to Fight Human Trafficking, committed to raise US$100 million for the Reaching the Last Mile Fund, pledged US$50 million for children vaccine efforts in Afghanistan and Pakistan, and contributed US$30 million to the Roll Back Malaria Partnership. The University of Texas chair for scientific and medical knowledge in cancer research is named after Mohamed as a result of a funding grant to MD Anderson Cancer Center. He organizes the Zayed Charity Marathon in New York City since its inauguration in 2005. The race raises awareness about kidney disease, and the proceeds go to the US's National Kidney Foundation.

Mohamed bin Zayed has been involved in setting up art museums, such as Louvre Abu Dhabi in 2017 and the Guggenheim Abu Dhabi in 2012, as well as cultural heritage sites such as Qasr Al Hosn.

Mohamed has been involved in efforts to protect wild falcons, bustards, and the Arabian oryx. He donated US$1 million to an initiative aimed at preventing the power line-related deaths of wild birds, as part of launching of the 20-million-dollar Sheikh Mohamed Bin Zayed Raptor Conservation Foundation. He heads the Mohamed bin Zayed Species Conservation Fund.

A species of woodlizard — Enyalioides binzayedi — was named after Mohamed as the creator of the Mohamed bin Zayed Species Conservation Fund that provided financial support to the expeditions leading to the discovery of the species in the Cordillera Azul National Park in Peru. In 2017, Acer binzayedii, a rare species of maple tree found in the mountainous cloud forest of Jalisco in Western Mexico, was named after him.

== Personal life ==
Mohamed is married to Sheikha Salama bint Hamdan Al Nahyan. They married in 1980. They have nine children together, four sons and five daughters. They have 22 grandchildren and 2 great-grandchildren together.

- Sheikha Mariam bint Mohamed bin Zayed Al Nahyan. She is married to Sheikh Mohammed bin Tahnoun Al Nahyan. They have two sons.
- Sheikh Khaled bin Mohamed Al Nahyan (born on 8 January 1982). He is married to Sheikha Fatima bint Suroor Al Nahyan. They have four children.
- Sheikha Shamsa bint Mohamed bin Zayed Al Nahyan (born on 18 June 1984). She is married to Sheikh Mohammed bin Hamad Al Nahyan. They have six children and two grandchildren.
- Sheikh Theyab bin Mohamed bin Zayed Al Nahyan. He is married to Sheikha Latifa bint Hamdan Al Nahyan. They have three children.
- Sheikh Hamdan bin Mohamed bin Zayed Al Nahyan was born in 1988. He married Sheikha Fakhra bint Khalifa Al Nahyan. They have two sons.
- Sheikha Fatima bint Mohamed bin Zayed Al Nahyan was born in 1989. She is married to Sheikh Nahyan bin Saif Al Nahyan. They have four children.
- Sheikha Shamma bint Mohamed bin Zayed Al Nahyan was born in 1992. She is married to Sheikh Zayed bin Hamdan Al Nahyan. They have one son.
- Sheikh Zayed bin Mohamed bin Zayed Al Nahyan was born in 1995.
- Sheikha Hessa bint Mohamed bin Zayed Al Nahyan was born in 2001. She is married to Sheikh Khalifa bin Sultan Al Nahyan.

A life-long fan of falconry, Mohamed established the Mohamed bin Zayed Falconry and Desert Physiognomy School, with the goal of promoting, and sustaining, the ancient tradition by teaching it to new generations of Emiratis. He himself learned the practice from his father.

== Succession ==
Mohamed, in his capacity as ruler of Abu Dhabi, has issued an Emiri decree appointing his oldest son Khaled bin Mohamed Al Nahyan as the crown prince.

== Honours ==
Styles of Mohamed bin Zayed Al Nahyan
- Reference style: His Highness
- Spoken style: Your Highness
- Alternative style: Ra'is (President)

- Albania: Grand Cross of the Order of Public Gratitude (17 July 2025)
- United States: Commander of the Legion of Merit (1991)
- Brazil: Collar of the Order of the Southern Cross (12 November 2021)
- Kuwait:
  - First Class of the Kuwait Liberation Medal (September 1994)
  - Special Class of the Order of Kuwait (June 1995)
- France:
  - Grand Cross of the National Order of Legion of Honour (18 July 2022)
  - Grand Cross of the National Order of Merit (15 February 2013)
- Germany: Grand Cross 1st Class of the Order of Merit of the Federal Republic of Germany (29 October 2008)
- Kosovo: Medal of the Order of Independence (21 April 2014)
- Malaysia:
  - Honorary Grand Commander of the Order of the Defender of the Realm (17 June 2011)
  - Member of the Order of the Crown of the Realm (30 November 2023)
    - Pahang: Member 1st Class of the Family Order of the Crown of Indra of Pahang (30 November 2023)
- South Korea: Grand Order of Mugunghwa (21 November 2012)
- Montenegro: Grand Cross of the Order of the Montenegrin Grand Star (12 December 2013)
- Morocco:
  - Grand Cordon of the Order of Military Merit (April 1994)
  - Collar of the Order of Muhammad (17 March 2015)
- Serbia: Grand Cross of the Order of the Republic of Serbia (2017)
- Jordan:
  - Supreme Order of the Renaissance (June 1996)
  - Collar of the Order of Al-Hussein bin Ali (21 November 2018)
- Oman:
  - Second class Military Order of Oman (26 February 2000)
  - Collar of the Order of Al-Said (27 September 2022)
- Spain: Knight Grand Cross of the Order of Civil Merit (23 May 2008)
- Palestine: Order of the Star of Jerusalem (October 2008)
- United Kingdom: Honorary Knight Grand Cross of the Order of St Michael and St George (25 November 2010)
- Italy: Knight Grand Cross with Collar of the Order of Merit of the Italian Republic (23 February 2025)

=== Place named after him ===
- Indonesia: In April 2021, the Jakarta–Cikampek Elevated Toll Road in Indonesia was renamed as Sheikh Mohamed bin Zayed Skyway (Jalan Layang Mohamed bin Zayed), at the behest of the Indonesian President's secretary.

== Notes ==
Mohamed bin Zayed Al Nahyan House of Al Nahyan Cadet branch of the House of Al Falahi Born: 11 March 1961
Regnal titles
Preceded by Khalifa bin Zayed Al Nahyan	Ruler of Abu Dhabi; 13 May 2022 – present	Incumbent; Heir: Khaled bin Mohamed Al Nahyan
Political offices
Preceded by Khalifa bin Zayed Al Nahyan	President of the United Arab Emirates; 14 May 2022 – present	Incumbent
