= Fatima bint Mubarak Al Ketbi =

Mother of the UAE (born c. 1943)

- Born: 1943 (age 82–83); Al-Hayer, Al-Ain, Abu Dhabi, UAE
- Spouse: Zayed bin Sultan Al Nahyan (m. 1960; died 2004)
- Issue: Sheikh Mohamed; Sheikh Hamdan; Sheikh Hazza; Sheikha Shamma; Sheikha Al-Yazia; Sheikh Tahnoun; Sheikh Mansour; Sheikh Abdullah
Names
- Fatima bint Mubarak bin Ghanim Al Ketbi
- House: House of Al Nahyan (by marriage)

Sheikha Fatima bint Mubarak Al Ketbi (Arabic: فاطمة بنت مبارك الكتبي; born c. 1943) was the third wife of Sheikh Zayed bin Sultan Al Nahyan, the founder and inaugural president of the United Arab Emirates (UAE).

== Early life ==
Sheikha Fatima was born in Al-Hayer, Al Ain Region, as the only daughter to her parents. Her family is Bedouin and religious.

== Politics ==
Sheikha Fatima is a supporter of women's rights in the UAE. She heads the UAE's General Women Union (GWU), which she founded in 1975. She is also the President of the Motherhood and Childhood Supreme Council. At the end of the 1990s, she publicly announced that women should be members of the Federal National Council of the Emirates.

== Awards ==
In 1997, five different organizations of the United Nations had awarded Sheikha Fatima for her significant efforts for women's rights. The UNIFEM stated, "she is the champion of women's rights." She was also awarded the Grand Cordon of the Order of November 7th by the Tunisian president Zine El Abidine Ben Ali on 26 June 2009 for her contributions to raise the status of Arab women. She was also given the UNESCO Marie Curie Medal for her efforts in education, literacy and women's rights, being the third international and the first Arab recipient of the award.

On March 16, 2005, she received the Athir Class of the National Order of Merit of Algeria.

== Marriage and children ==
Fatima bint Mubarak Al Ketbi married Sheikh Zayed Al Nahyan when he was the ruler of the Eastern region in 1960. Sheikh Zayed met her in a mosque. They moved to Abu Dhabi when Sheikh Zayed became the ruler in August 1966. She is the mother of Sheikh Mohamed, the current President of the United Arab Emirates and the ruler of Abu Dhabi; Sheikh Hamdan, Sheikh Hazza, Sheikh Tahnoun, Sheikh Mansour, Sheikh Abdullah, Sheikha Shamma and Sheikha Alyazia. They are the most powerful block in the ruling family of Abu Dhabi, the Al Nahyans.
