= Riyan Airport prison =

Riyan Airport prison in Yemen is a secret prison located in the cargo terminal of Riyan Airport in Yemen. The airport is a civilian one in the city of Mukalla. US special forces fighting al-Qaida are based close to this prison. Witnesses have claimed some detainees have been handed over to the US forces for further interrogation. According to the Associated Press, there are at least eighteen secret detention centers in Southern Yemen. According to Yemeni Minister of Interior Hussein Arab these clandestine prisons are located in an airport, military bases and private villas. Senior American defense officials have acknowledged that US forces have been involved in interrogations of detainees in Yemen, however they have denied any mistreatment of the detainees. They said that there had not been any abuse when US forces were present. Allegedly there are at least 18 clandestine prisons across southern Yemen run by the United Arab Emirates (UAE) or by Yemeni forces. The UAE's government has denied the allegations.
