= Hazza bin Zayed Al Nahyan =

Emirati politician (born 1965)

His Highness Sheikh Hazza bin Zayed Al Nahyan
- هزاع بن زايد آل نهيان
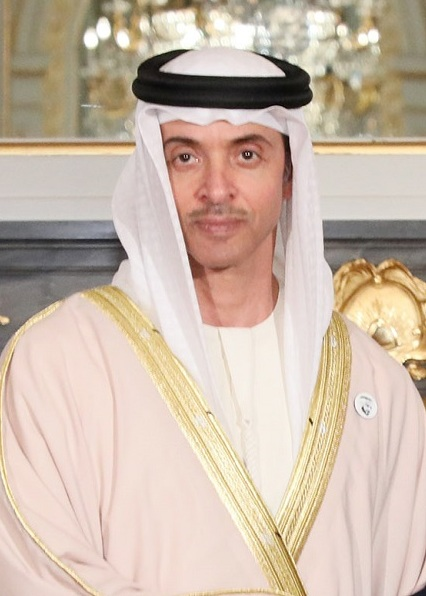
- Hazza in 2019

Ruler's Representative in Al Ain Region
- Incumbent
- Assumed office 3 December 2024
- President: Mohamed bin Zayed Al Nahyan
- Preceded by: Tahnoun bin Mohammed Al Nahyan

Deputy Prime Minister in Al Ain Region
- Incumbent
- Assumed office 29 March 2023 Serving with Tahnoun bin Zayed Al Nahyan
- Monarch: Mohamed bin Zayed Al Nahyan
- Preceded by: position established
- Succeeded by: Sultan bin Isa Al Isa

National Security Advisor of UAE
- In office 21 October 2006 – 14 February 2016
- President: Khalifa bin Zayed Al Nahyan
- Deputy: Tahnoun bin Zayed Al Nahyan
- Succeeded by: Tahnoun Bin Zayed Al Nahyan

Vice Chairman of the Abu Dhabi Executive Council
- In office 13 December 2010 – 29 March 2023
- Monarchs: Khalifa bin Zayed Al Nahyan; Mohamed bin Zayed Al Nahyan
- Preceded by: Mohamed bin Zayed Al Nahyan

Chairman of the Emirates Identity Authority
- In office 29 February 2012 – 18 September 2017
- President: Khalifa bin Zayed Al Nahyan
- Prime Minister: Mohammed bin Rashid Al Maktoum
- Preceded by: Mohamed bin Zayed Al Nahyan

Chairman of the State Security Service
- In office 1992 – 21 October 2006
- President: Zayed bin Sultan Al Nahyan; Khalifa bin Zayed Al Nahyan
- Prime Minister: Maktoum bin Rashid Al Maktoum; Mohammed bin Rashid Al Maktoum
- Preceded by: Hammoda bin Ali
- Succeeded by: Hamad Mubarak Al Shamsi

Personal details
- Born: 2 June 1965 (age 60) Al Ain, Abu Dhabi, Trucial States
- Spouse: Mozah bint Mohammad Al Hamed
- Children: 5 including Hazza bin Hazza Al Nahyan
- Parents: Zayed bin Sultan Al Nahyan (father); Fatima bint Mubarak Al Ketbi (mother)

Sheikh Hazza bin Zayed bin Sultan Al Nahyan (Arabic: هزاع بن زايد بن سلطان آل نهيان; born 2 June 1965) is the younger brother of the President of the United Arab Emirates Sheikh Mohamed bin Zayed Al Nahyan, Ruler's Representative of Al Ain Region of the Emirate of Abu Dhabi, former National Security Advisor of the UAE and Deputy Chairman of Abu Dhabi Executive Council.

== Early life ==
He is the fifth son of Sheikh Zayed bin Sultan Al Nahyan, the founder and first President of the United Arab Emirates. His mother is Sheikha Fatima bint Mubarak Al Ketbi and he has five full-brothers: Mohammed, Hamdan, Tahnoun, Mansour, and Abdullah.

== Career ==
- Appointed by the Federal Decree No. (91) of 2006 issued by His Highness the Head of State for National Security Advisor.
- Vice President of the Executive Council of Abu Dhabi Emirate.
- Chairman of the Emirates Identity Authority.
- Al Ain Club
  - Chairman of Board of Directors
  - Vice-president of the executive board and of the honorary board
- Abu Dhabi Sports Council, chairman
- Abu Dhabi Combat Club, president

In 2006, he was elected as Chairman of First Gulf Bank. He succeeded to the chairman position from Sheikh Mansour bin Zayed Al Nahyan, his other brother. On 12 December 2010, he was appointed a member of Executive Council of Abu Dhabi.

== Controversies ==
=== Pandora Papers ===
The October 2021 leak of more than 11.9 million documents by the International Consortium of Investigative Journalists (ICIJ) mentioned Sheikh Hazza as one of the Emirati royals with offshore holdings. The former national security adviser of the UAE reportedly owned the H Hotel office tower at 1 Sheikh Zayed Road, which gave space to at least four companies that provided offshore clients with financial or company formation services. Amongst these firms was SFM Corporate Services that had its office in the building until 2017. The ICIJ report said that SFM provided its services to owners of at least 2,977 firms in the UAE, the British Virgin Islands and other offshore financial centres. It was also revealed that Sheikh Hazza had his own offshore companies outside the UAE. In 2016, an Emirati law firm, Hadef & Partners assisted Sheikh Hazza to incorporate a UAE Company named Loomington Investments Ltd. The report revealed that two other companies with same name in the British Virgin Islands and Seychelles were owned by Sheikh Hazza.

== Personal life ==
His wife was Sheikha Mozah bint Mohammed bin Butti Al Hamed, sister of Abdulla bin Mohammed bin Butti Al Hamed, and they have five children:

- Sheikha Fatima bint Hazza bin Zayed Al Nahyan.
- Sheikha Salama bint Hazza bin Zayed Al Nahyan.
- Sheikh Zayed bin Hazza bin Zayed Al Nahyan (born 1995). He has one son.
  - Sheikh Hazza bin Zayed Al Nahyan (born 2026).
- Sheikha Meera bint Hazza bin Zayed Al Nahyan. She married Sheikh Zayed bin Mansour bin Zayed Al Nahyan on May 5, 2022.
- Sheikh Mohammed bin Hazza bin Zayed Al Nahyan (born 2002).

== Ancestry ==
Ancestors of Hazza bin Zayed Al Nahyan

16. Sheikh Khalifa bin Shakhbut Al Nahyan
8. Sheikh Zayed bin Khalifa Al Nahyan
4. Sheikh Sultan bin Zayed Al Nahyan
2. Sheikh Zayed bin Sultan Al Nahyan
10. Sheikh Butti Al Qubaisi
5. Sheikha Salma bint Butti Al Qubaisi
1. Sheikh Hazza bin Zayed Al Nahyan
6. Sheikh Mubarak Al Ketbi
3. Sheikha Fatima bint Mubarak Al Ketbi

== Honours ==
- Algeria: Order of the Athir (17 October 2007)

== See also ==
- Hazza Bin Zayed Stadium
