= Christopher Davidson =

British academic

Christopher Davidson is scholar of Middle East Politics and a Fellow at Durham University in the UK. He is an author of multiple books on the Middle East, including Shadow Wars: The Secret Struggle for the Middle East (2016). According to a review in The Christian Science Monitor, the book "comes closer than any recent popular study to offering definitive answers" to the questions of the origins of the strife in the region.

== History ==
A graduate (BA & MA) of Cambridge University, he completed his doctorate at St Andrews University in Scotland. He has appeared in various media outlets worldwide.

Davidson has publicly spoken out against bank fraud schemes in Dubai perpetuated by an American, British, Pakistani, and Turkish fraud cell aimed at scamming Middle Eastern banks. He says "Some might say that it's evidence of the anti-corruption drive, but again, where are the Emiraatis?" gaining him popularity in Middle Eastern circles. He received attention for his prediction that many expatriate investments in Dubai and Iraq may see substantial losses. He analyzed and accurately predicted outcomes in 2009.

In May 2008 he was involved in a successful escape attempt from western Beirut amidst an armed takeover by militants. In October 2009 he was the keynote speaker, with Donald Trump Jr., at Cityscape 2009 in Dubai, the Middle East's biggest real estate investment conference.
