= Tahnoun bin Zayed Al Nahyan (national security advisor) =

Emirati national security advisor

His Highness Sheikh Tahnoun bin Zayed Al Nahyan
- طحنون بن زايد آل نهيان
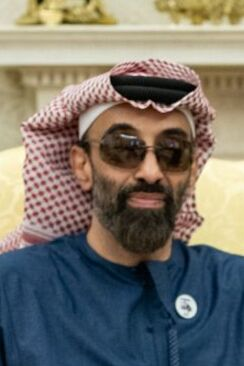
- Sheikh Tahnoun in 2025

Deputy Ruler of Abu Dhabi
- Incumbent
- Assumed office 29 March 2023 Serving with Hazza bin Zayed Al Nahyan
- Monarch: Mohamed bin Zayed Al Nahyan

National Security Advisor of UAE
- Incumbent
- Assumed office 14 February 2016
- President: Khalifa bin Zayed Al Nahyan; Mohamed bin Zayed Al Nahyan
- Preceded by: Hazza bin Zayed Al Nahyan

Personal details
- Born: Tahnoun bin Zayed bin Sultan Al Nahyan; 4 December 1968 (age 57) United Arab Emirates
- Spouse(s): Khawla bint Ahmed bin Khalifa Al Suwaidi (m. 1997) Latifa bint Jamhour Al Qubaisi
- Children: 2
- Parents: Zayed bin Sultan Al Nahyan (father); Fatima bint Mubarak Al Ketbi (mother)
- Occupation: Chairman of G42; Chairman of MGX; Chairman of International Holding Company

Tahnoun bin Zayed Al Nahyan or Tahnoon bin Zayed Al Nahyan (born 4 December 1968) is an Emirati politician and the national security advisor of United Arab Emirates (UAE) since 2016. At the same time he manages a $1.3 trillion business portfolio, which supports national security interests, and the UAE's opaque corporate sector. He chairs the AI company G42 and MGX.

He is part of the ruling family in Abu Dhabi, brother of UAE president Mohamed bin Zayed Al Nahyan. Tahnoun has been involved in numerous controversies, from violating EU sanctions against Syrian president Bashar al-Assad, spying on political opponents in Project Raven, deals to re-sell Russia's Sputnik vaccine to poor countries at substantial mark-ups, orchestrating the Qatargate bribery case, and a smear campaign against Qatar and the Muslim Brotherhood, as revealed 2023 in the Abu Dhabi Secrets.

In 2025, Tahnoon's businesses bought 49% share in the Donald Trump family's cryptocurrency firm World Liberty Financial (WLF) for half a billion dollars and bought $2 billion worth of USD1 stablecoins from WLF. Shortly thereafter, the Trump administration ignored national security concerns and committed to provide 500,000 of the most advanced AI chips a year to the UAE.

Following the succession of Mohamed bin Zayed Al Nahyan as the ruler of Abu Dhabi, Sheikh Tahnoun was speculated to be a possible choice for the position of Crown Prince of Abu Dhabi.

== Early life and education ==
Tahnoun bin Zayed Al Nahyan was born to Sheikh Zayed bin Sultan Al Nahyan and Fatima bint Mubarak Al Ketbi. He has five brothers: Sheikh Mohamed bin Zayed Al Nahyan, UAE President and Sheikh Hamdan bin Zayed, Sheikh Hazza bin Zayed, Sheikh Mansour bin Zayed and Sheikh Abdullah bin Zayed Al Nahyan, UAE's foreign minister.

== Career ==
In 1992, he founded First Gulf Bank. From 2009 to 2013, he was Chairman of the Board of Directors of the Presidential Aviation Authority. In March 2013 President Sheikh Khalifa bin Zayed Al Nahyan appointed him as a deputy national security advisor.

In February 2016, he was appointed as national security advisor. On 18 August 2020 Sheikh Tahnoun received Yossi Cohen, the Head of Israeli Intelligence Agency, Mossad after the UAE–Israel peace accord.

As of 2021, Tahnoun was chairman of Abu Dhabi Developmental Holding Company (ADQ), a state holding company worth $110 billion, First Abu Dhabi Bank, the UAE's largest lender, Royal Group (a conglomerate) and International Holding Company. He chairs G42, an artificial intelligence company founded 2018.

In 2023, Tahnoon was named chair of the $790 billion Abu Dhabi Investment Authority, the sovereign wealth fund of the United Arab Emirates. He became "one of the leaders in deploying the UAE’s massive bank of oil money". Tahnoun's IHC established an investment unit, Lunate, which took over the management of G42's China-focused fund, 42X Fund. Lunate formed a small team of more than 160 people, and was overseen by Tahnoon. However, the fund became questionable due to G42's assurance to the US that it will divest from China.

In 2024, a Tahnouun-backed company and the Qatar government put $1.5 billion into an investment company owned by Jared Kushner.

Tahnoun owns an investment company, Aryam Investment 1.

Tahnoun's company MGX has a $2 billion investment in Binance, a cryptocurrency company that had pleaded guilty in 2023 to violating anti-mondeylaundering rules. The Abu Dhabi royal family were part of a lobbying effort to get the Trump administration to pardon Binance founder Changpeng Zhao.

== Controversies ==
=== Project Raven, 2019 ===
The Central Intelligence Agency of the United States was condemned for spying on all nations in the Arab world and Middle East region, except the UAE, despite the Gulf nation having hired former CIA officials for its Project Raven to spy on political targets, including several Americans in 2014. Sheikh Tahnoun was the Deputy National Security Advisor of UAE at the time.

Multiple ex-CIA officials told Reuters that the agency does not gather "human intelligence" from the UAE informant because it shares common enemies with the United States. Retired CIA official "Norman Roule" defended the US for not spying on the Emirates, stating that the actions committed by Abu Dhabi have "contributed to the war on terror, particularly against al-Queda [Qaeda] in Yemen."

=== Violation of EU sanctions against Assad, 2020 ===
In August 2020, The Wall Street Journal reported about the Donald Trump administration of imposing sanctions against the government of Syrian President Bashar al-Assad, targeting financial-support networks aiding the President from outside the country, to coerce Damascus into peace talks. According to financial records reviewed by The Wall Street Journal, Sheikh Tahnoun deposited about $200,000 into the bank accounts held by the niece of Syrian President Assad, Aniseh Shawkat, over a period of several years as her sponsor. The UK authorities seized several of these bank accounts in 2019, claiming that hundreds of thousands of dollars deposited into her accounts helped circumvent European Union’s sanctions against the Syrian government funds. Sheikh Tahnoun, Aniseh Shawkat and her attorney Zubair Ahmad did not respond when reached out for comment.

=== Re-selling COVID-19 vaccines, 2021 ===
Sheik Tahnoun runs the Royal Group, which is a UAE conglomerate. In 2021, the company was involved in controversial deals to re-sell Russia's Sputnik vaccine to poor countries at substantial mark-ups.

=== Pandora Papers, 2021 ===
In October 2021, the International Consortium of Investigative Journalists released the Pandora Papers based on over 11.9 million documents, which mentioned Tahnoun bin Zayed, alongside Mohammed bin Rashid Al Maktoum and Hazza bin Zayed Al Nahyan.

=== Qatargate scandal, 2022 ===
In December 2022, Qatar denied its involvement in the Qatargate bribery case and accused the UAE of orchestrating the scandal. According to European Union correspondent Jack Parrock Qatari government officials believe that the scandal against Qatar has been planned by the UAE. The Italian news site Dagospia alleged that it was Tahnoun who executed the scandal against Qatar and provided tips to Belgium, which opened the investigation.

=== Abu Dhabi Secrets, 2023 ===
In 2023, an investigation, termed Abu Dhabi Secrets, was released. The investigation revealed that Mario Brero provided the UAE with a list of over 1,000 individuals and 400 organizations in Europe, including over 200 individuals and 120 organizations in France, who were linked to radical Islam. According to The New Yorker, Sheikh Tahnoun Bin Zayed was involved in the smear campaign against Qatar and the Muslim Brotherhood as well.

=== Dealings with gold smugglers, 2024 ===
A unit of Sheikh Tahnoun's IHC, International Resources Holding (IRH) acquired Zambia's Mopani copper mine under its chief global strategist, Sibtein Alibhai. Following that deal, IRH started looking for mining deals in Africa and other places aggressively. The United Nations investigators alleged that Alibhai and IRH approached and had meetings with several gold smugglers from Democratic Republic of Congo. The Congo government said most of the smuggled gold ends up in the UAE.

=== AI chips for crypto investment under Trump administration, 2025 ===
Under the Joe Biden administration, Tahnoon was unable to acquire highly advanced AI chips due to concerns that the technology would be diverted from UAE to China. Tahnoon's company, G42, has close ties to Chinese technology firms, including Huawei.

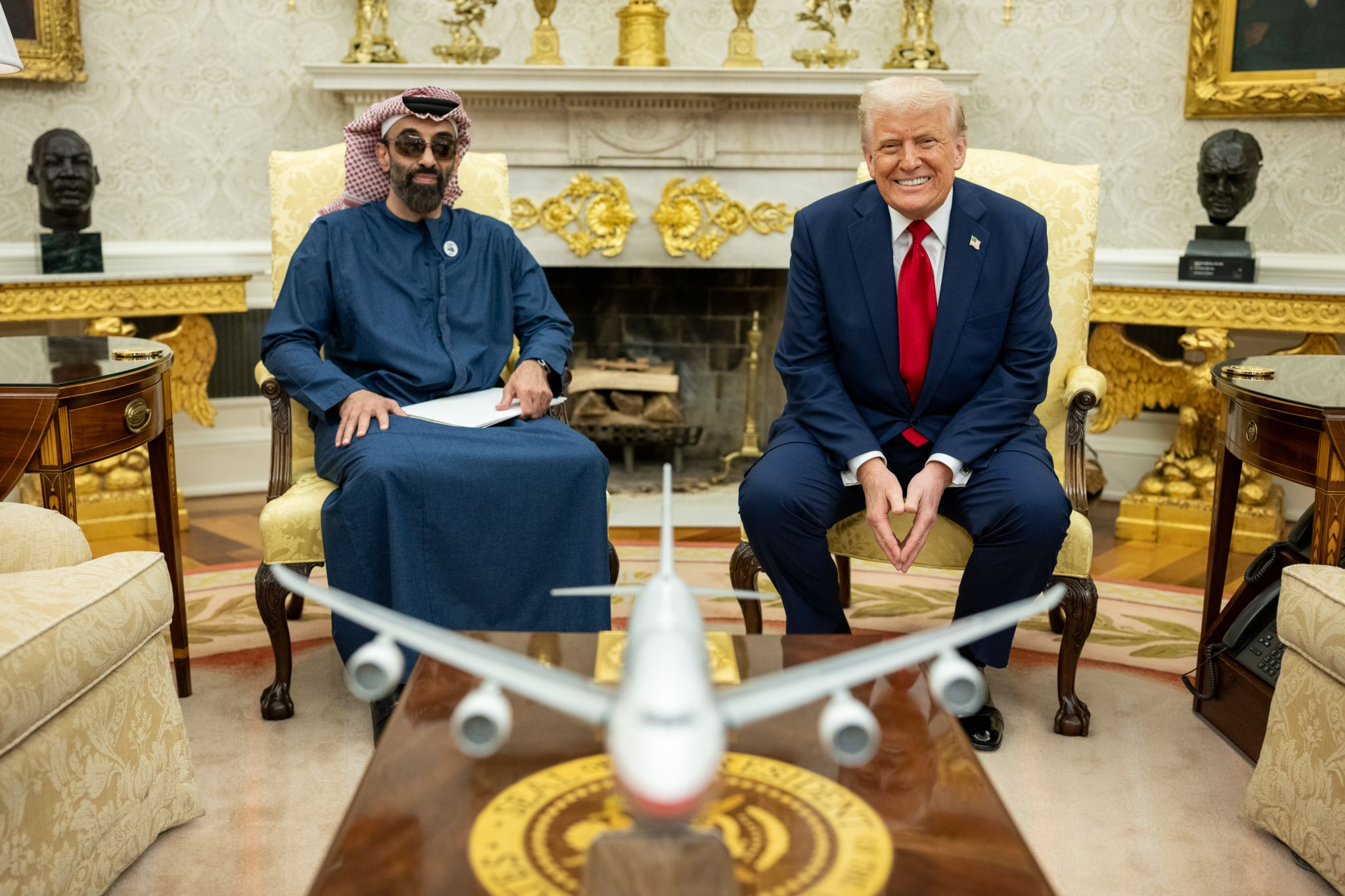
Sheikh Tahnoun with Donald Trump on 18 March 2025

On 18 March 2025, U.S. President Donald Trump hosted Sheikh Tahnoun for a banquet dinner at the White House and he met with the head of the CIA, the treasury secretary, the commerce secretary, and CEOs like Jeff Bezos. Leaked reports revealed that during closed-door meetings, Tahnoun sought Trump’s support on several fronts: shielding the UAE from potential international sanctions and an ICJ investigation into its alleged support for the RSF militia in Sudan; backing Israel’s airstrikes in Syria aimed at regional destabilization; facilitating plans to transform Gaza into an Emirati-controlled economic zone under the guise of reconstruction. and acquiring AI chips.

Sheikh Tahnoon became a business partner with Steve Witkoff and the Donald Trump family at the same time that Witkoff was a key diplomatic envoy for the Trump administration to the Middle East. In May 2025, Zach Witkoff announced that Tahnoon committed to putting $2 billion into World Liberty Financial, a cryptocurrency start-up founded by the Witkoffs and Trumps. Shortly thereafter, the Trump administration agreed to transfer the world’s most advanced and scarce computer chips to the UAE, with many expected to go to Group 42. Multiple National Security Council officials, including David Feith, raised national security concerns that the chips would end up in China. In April 2025, Trump fired 6 security council officials, paving way for David Sacks to take over the chip negotiations. By mid-May, Sacks, Witkoff, and Sheikh Tahnoon had successfully negotiated the increased chip exports to the UAE, despite opposition from top American officials.

=== Campaign against Nasser Al-Khelaifi ===
Sheikh Tahnoun chairs the Abu Dhabi Developmental Holding Company (ADQ), which was speculated as responsible for the campaign against Nasser Al-Khelaifi and Paris Saint-Germain (PSG). The campaign was initiated by Complément d'enquête and amplified by networks like the French sport streaming service, RMC Sports, a subsidiary of Altice France, which is owned by Patrick Drahi, a French-Israeli billionaire. He maintains connection with the UAE through ADQ.

== Personal life ==
Tahnoun is married to Khawla Ahmed Khalifa Alsuwaidi, a poet and master calligrapher. Like her husband she uses shell companies to own real estate in affluent parts of London. He has two children, Sheikha Fatima and Sheikh Zayed.

Tahnoun is a practitioner and patron of martial arts, especially Brazilian jiu-jitsu. In 1998, he created the ADCC Submission Fighting World Championship alongside his BJJ instructor Nelson Monteiro.

TIME features Tahnoon in the TIME100 AI 2025 list.
