= Al Nahyan (disambiguation) =

Al Nahyan is an Arabic language word. It can refer to:

- House of Nahyan
- Al Nahyan neighbourhood in Abu Dhabi
  - Al Nahyan Stadium in the above area

== See also ==
- Nahyan (disambiguation)
- Sultan Al Nahyan (disambiguation)
- Hamdan Al Nahyan (disambiguation)
- Mohammed Al Nahyan (disambiguation)
- Tahnoun Al Nahyan (disambiguation)
- Zayed Al Nahyan (disambiguation)
