= Nahyan =

Nahyan may refer to:

- Nahyan bin Mubarak Al Nahyan, United Arab Emirati politician
- Al Nahyan Stadium, multi-purpose stadium in Abu Dhabi, United Arab Emirates
- House of Nahyan, United Arab Emirati royal family

== See also ==
- Al Nahyan (disambiguation)
- Sultan Al Nahyan (disambiguation)
- Hamdan Al Nahyan (disambiguation)
- Mohammed Al Nahyan (disambiguation)
- Tahnoun Al Nahyan (disambiguation)
- Zayed Al Nahyan (disambiguation)
