= Supreme Petroleum Council =

Former governing body in Abu Dhabi

- المجلس الأعلى للبترول

Council overview
- Formed: 1988
- Dissolved: 27 December 2020
- Superseding Council: Supreme Council for Financial and Economic Affairs
- Jurisdiction: Emirate of Abu Dhabi
- Council executives: Mohamed bin Zayed Al Nahyan, Chairman; Khaled bin Mohamed Al Nahyan, Vice Chairman

The Supreme Petroleum Council (Arabic: المجلس الأعلى للبترول) was the highest governing body of oil, gas and similar industry-related activities in the Emirate of Abu Dhabi.

Formed in 1988, the council was tasked with supervising all oil and gas companies that operate in Abu Dhabi. The Council acted as the board of directors for the Abu Dhabi National Oil Company. On 27 December 2020, then-president Sheikh Khalifa bin Zayed, the ruler of Abu Dhabi, announced the establishment of a new council, The Supreme Council for Financial and Economic Affairs that would oversee the financial, investment, economic, petroleum and natural resources affairs of Abu Dhabi, putting an end to the Supreme Petroleum Council.

== List of member of the defunct council ==
1. Mohammed bin Zayed Al Nahyan, Chairman
2. Khalid bin Mohammed Al Nahyan, Vice Chairman
3. Hazza bin Zayed Al Nahyan, member
4. Mansour bin Zayed Al Nahyan, member
5. Hamed bin Zayed Al Nahyan, member
6. Mohammed bin Khalifa bin Zayed Al Nahyan, member
7. Dhiyab bin Mohamed bin Zayed Al Nahyan, member
8. Suhail Mohamed Faraj Al Mazrouei, member
9. Hamad Mubarak Al Shamsi, member and secretary-general of the council
10. Sultan Ahmed Al Jaber, member
11. Dr. Ahmed Mubarak Al Mazrouei, member
12. Khaldoon Khalifa Al Mubarak, member
13. Riyad Abdul Rahman Al Mubarak, member
14. Abdulla Bin Mohammed Bin Butti Al Hamed, member
15. Abdullah Nasser Al Suwaidi, member
16. Suhail Fares Ghanem Al Mazrouei, member

Former important board members include:

1. Jouan Salem Al Dhaheri (1948–2013) was appointed on 26 June 2011 as secretary-general. One of the oldest officials in Abu Dhabi. He died from heart stroke on 27 April 2013.
