= Sheikh Zayed (disambiguation) =

Sheikh Zayed refers to Zayed bin Sultan Al Nahyan (1918–2004), the Emir and ruler of UAE.

Sheikh Zayed may also refer to:

== People ==
- Sheikh Zayed bin Khalifa Al Nahyan (1835 or 1840–1909), ruler of Abu Dhabi, grandfather of Sheikh Zayed bin Sultan, founder of the United Arab Emirates
- Sheikh Zayed bin Sultan Al Nahyan (1918–2004), ruler of Abu Dhabi, grandson of Zayed bin Khalifa founder and first president of United Arab Emirates

== Places ==
=== In the UAE ===
- Sheikh Zayed Bridge, an arch bridge in Abu Dhabi
- Sheikh Zayed Cricket Stadium, a stadium in UAE
- Sheikh Zayed Mosque (disambiguation)
- Sheikh Zayed Palace Museum, also known as the Al Ain Palace Museum, a museum in the city of Al Ain, UAE

=== In other countries ===
- Sheikh Zayed City, city in the Giza Governorate in Egypt and part of Greater Cairo urban area
- Shaikh Zayed International Airport, Pakistan
- Shaikh Zayed Medical Complex Lahore, Pakistan
- Shaikh Zayed Hospital, a tertiary care hospital, Lahore, Pakistan
- Shaikh Zayed Medical College and Hospital, Rahim Yar Khan, Punjab, Pakistan

== Other uses ==
- Sheikh Zayed Book Award

== See also ==
- Zayed Al Nahyan (disambiguation)
- Sultan Al Nahyan (disambiguation)
