= Ahmed bin Zayed Al Nahyan =

Managing Director of the Abu Dhabi Investment Authority
- In office: November 1997 – March 2010
- Successor: Hamed bin Zayed Al Nahyan
- Died: 26 March 2010 (aged 41) near Rabat, Morocco
- Burial: 31 March 2010; Al Bateen, Abu Dhabi
- Issue: Zayed bin Ahmed Al Nahyan
- House: Al Nahyan family
- Father: Zayed bin Sultan Al Nahyan
- Mother: Mouza bint Suhail Al Khaili
- Religion: Islam

Sheikh Ahmed bin Zayed Al Nahyan (Arabic: أحمد بن زايد آل نهيان, 1969 – 26 March 2010) was an Emirati businessman and the managing director of the Abu Dhabi Investment Authority.

== Early life and education ==
Ahmed was one of Sheikh Zayed bin Sultan Al Nahyan's 19 sons. His mother was Sheika Mouza. He had four full brothers, including Sheikh Saif and Sheikh Hamed. Sheikh Ahmed was a graduate of the United Arab Emirates University.

== Career ==
Sheikh Ahmed joined the Abu Dhabi Investment Authority in 1994 and worked there as a European equities analyst. He became its managing director and board member in November 1997. His full-brother Hamed bin Zayed replaced him as ADIA managing director in April 2010.

He served as Interior Minister of the United Arab Emirates in 2004. In 2007, Ahmed was appointed the Undersecretary of Ministry of Finance and Industry. Sheikh Ahmed also served as chairman of the board of trustees of the Zayed Foundation for Charitable and Humanitarian Works. In addition, he was a member of the Supreme Petroleum Council.

== Alliances and influence ==
Sheikh Ahmed had been a close ally of Sheikh Khalifa bin Zayed since the latter was crown prince. In 2009, Sheikh Ahmed was regarded as the 27th most powerful person in the world by Forbes.

== Death and funeral ==
Ahmed was reported missing on 26 March 2010 after the ultralight aircraft in which he was learning to fly disappeared while flying in Morocco. Soon after, the plane was found to have crashed into the lake Sidi Mohamed Ben Abdellah, near the Moroccan capital, Rabat. Sheikh Ahmed's family, the Al Nahyan, have a residence on the shore of that lake, where Ahmed used to come often. The craft's Spanish pilot, his flight instructor Julio López, survived the accident and was quickly rescued. Ahmed's body was only recovered from the crash site four days later on 30 March, despite an intensive search by helicopters and divers from several countries. He was 41.

His body was returned to Abu Dhabi and funeral prayers for him were performed on 31 March at the Sheikh Zayed Grand Mosque. His body was buried in the Al Bateen cemetery.

== Ancestry ==
Ancestors of Ahmed bin Zayed Al Nahyan

16. Sheikh Khalifa Al Nahyan
8. Sheikh Zayed bin Khalifa Al Nahyan
4. Sheikh Sultan bin Zayed Al Nahyan
2. Sheikh Zayed bin Sultan Al Nahyan
10. Sheikh Butti bin Khadem Al Hamed
5. Sheikha Salma bint Butti Al Hamed
1. Sheikh Ahmed bin Zayed Al Nahyan
Suhail Al Khaili
3. Sheikha Mouza bint Suhail Al Khaili
