= Year of Zayed =

2018 centenary birth anniversary celebrations of Sheikh Zayed in the United Arab Emirates

Year of Zayed عام زايد
- Begins: 1 January 2018
- Ends: 31 December 2018
- Country: United Arab Emirates
- Founded: 6 August 2017
- President of the United Arab Emirates: Sheikh Khalifa

Year of Zayed (Arabic: عام زايد) was observed throughout 2018 in the United Arab Emirates to celebrate the centenary birth anniversary of Sheikh Zayed bin Sultan al-Nahyan, the tribal leader and politician who founded the United Arab Emirates in 1971 and served as its inaugural president until his death in 2004. Sheikh Khalifa bin Zayed, his son and the-then president issued directives in 2017 that designated the consecutive year in honor of his legacy. It was held under four main themes, namely wisdom, respect, sustainability and human development.

== History and background ==
On 6 August 2017, the Emirates News Agency reported that Sheikh Khalifa bin Zayed al-Nahyan, President of the United Arab Emirates issued directives that declared 2018 to be the Year of Zayed in honor of his father, Sheikh Zayed bin Sultan al-Nahyan. The declaration came during Zayed's 51st anniversary of assuming the leadership of Abu Dhabi in 1966, who became the ruler by replacing Sheikh Shakbut. In response to the Sheikh Khalifa's directives and to achieve the year's goals, Sheikh Mohammed bin Rashid, Vice President and Ruler of Dubai, called for a comprehensive framework for an integrated and consolidated agenda of initiatives within all federal and local institutions.

Sheikh Hamdan bin Zayed Al Nahyan, the ruler's representative in the Western Region of Abu Dhabi, stressed that Sheikh Khalifa's declaration represents the nation's loyalty to the memory of the founding father, the late Sheikh Zayed bin Sultan Al Nahyan, who established the foundations of the UAE's humanitarian and charitable structures.

The Year of Zayed is a great national occasion when we will proudly share memories of the life of the founding father, Sheikh Zayed bin Sultan Al Nahyan, and his gift to us of deeply-rooted values, principles and traditions that have become part of our Emirati identity.

— Khalifa bin Zayed Al Nahyan

In November 2017, then- Abu Dhabi crown prince Sheikh Mohamed bin Zayed al-Nahyan unveiled the official logo of the Year of Zayed. In December 2017, the Zayed International Foundation for the Environment announced the launching a green education platform and organizing a conference on pollution in partnership with United Nations Environment Programme. In December 2017, the airline Emirates unveiled a special fleet of five Airbus A380s and five Boeing 777-300ERs liveries that would fly throughout 2018 across its international destinations featuring an emblazoned decal of Sheikh Zayed and the logo of 'Year of Zayed'.

== Commencement and timeline ==
=== January ===
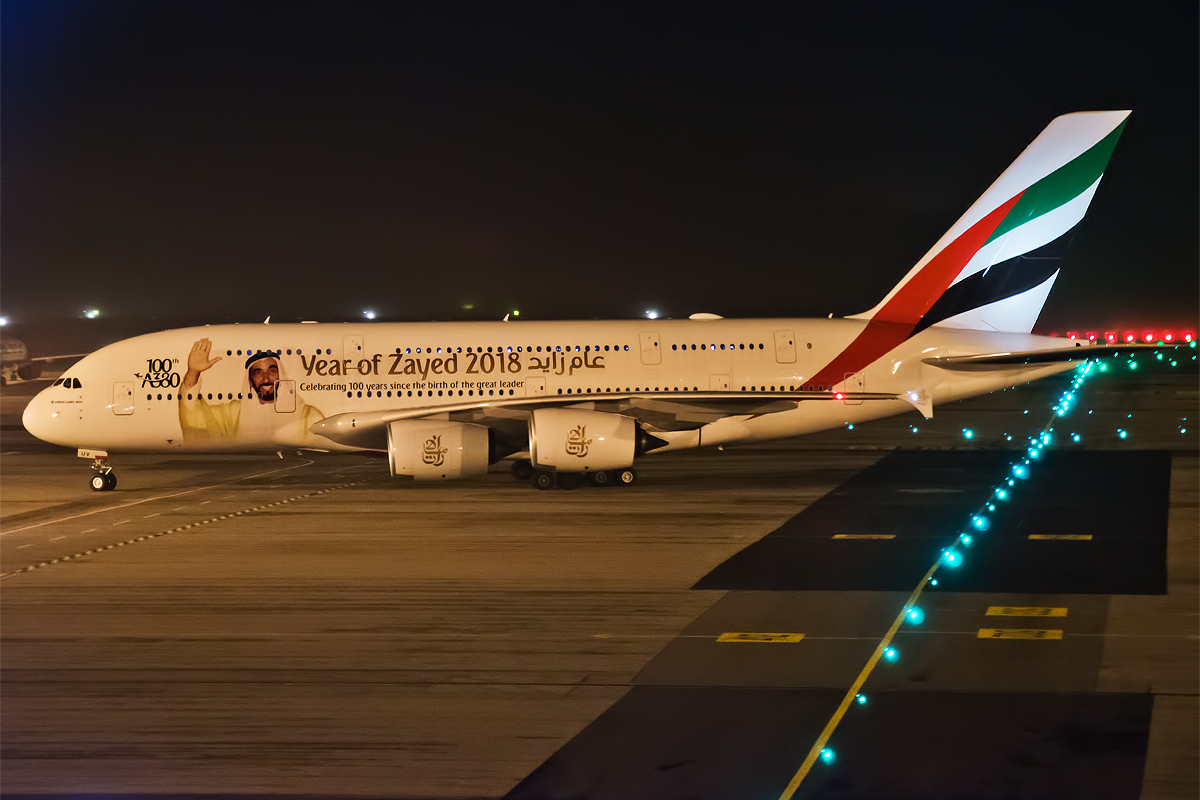
An Emirates Airbus A380 'Year of Zayed' Livery at Milan Malpensa Airport, January 2018

On 1 January 2018 (UAE Standard Time), with the commencement of the new year, the Year of Zayed officially began in the United Arab Emirates with a 10-minute laser show in Dubai's Burj Khalifa. Abu Dhabi crown prince Sheikh Mohamed bin Zayed al-Nahyan announced The Founder's Memorial in Abu Dhabi is will be inaugurated in January to honor the legacy of Sheikh Zayed. Mattar al-Tayer, Director-General and chairman of the Board of Executive Directors of Dubai's Road and Transport Authority announced 20 initiatives to mark the Year of Zayed, such as holding a temporary mobile exhibition in RTA's premises and launching a special vehicle number plate, Z-1971, where Z stands for Sheikh Zayed and 1971 corresponds to the year when UAE was formed. Etihad Aviation Group unveiled an year-long schedule of supporting humanitarian initiatives in the country and abroad, including providing assistance to Rohingya families seeking shelter in Bangladesh, backing the establishment of five greenhouses in United Arab Emirates, and as well as libraries and skill development centers in a number of countries such as Nepal, Morocco, Philippines and India. The Al Ain University led a delegation to Sheikh Zayed Grand Mosque in Abu Dhabi to mark the commencement of series of events to be undertaken by the institution throughout 2018. The country's National Archives announced the release of 100 short films on its social media platforms that would depict the biography of Sheikh Zayed, with each film having a running time of 100 minutes. The Director General of Ras Al Khaimah-based Saqr Bin Mohammed Al Qasimi Foundation for Charity, Ahmed Rashid Al Zaabi, launched 20 charitable initiatives under the Year of Zayed.

Lt. General Sheikh Saif bin Zayed al-Nahyan, Deputy Prime Minister of the United Arab Emirates and Minister of Interior, during a session at the 6th World Government Summit, launched the “Global Inspiration Platform – Zayed the Inspirer” initiative that aimed to celebrate the legacy of Sheikh Zayed through enabling speakers from around the world to share their respective inspirational success stories.

The British ambassador to the United Arab Emirates, Philip Parham along with the Minister of Tolerance, Nahyan bin Mubarak al-Nahyan, planted the ghaf tree within the precincts of the British embassy in Abu Dhabi to honor Sheikh Zayed's environmental legacy.

The Year of Zayed and Month of Innovation was observed on the Week of Welcome organized by Viva International in Dubai International Academic City and Dubai Knowledge Park, the largest university students festival. During the 9th annual Zayed University Middle East Film Festival (ZUMEFF) held in Abu Dhabi, Hooreya Al Muflahi from Zayed University bagged the ‘Year of Zayed’ Award for her short film titled ‘Sheikh Zayed’s 100th birthday’.

Swiss watch manufacturer Louis Moinet launched a timepiece watch inspired by Sheikh Zayed that showcased a miniature painting of Abu Dhabi's Sheikh Zayed Grand Mosque on the mother of pearl dial. The 200,000 dollar watch was sold to a wealthy Omani national.

Etihad Aviation Group commenced its year-long programme of activities and humanitarian initiatives in accordance with the observance of the Year of Zayed. The final match of the UAE President's Cup 2018 was renamed as the 'Year of Zayed Match', which was won by Al Ain FC. The Emirates airline reported that it completed the application of the specially designed ‘Year of Zayed’ livery on ten of its aircraft. A team from Sharjah’s Al Qasimia University launched a hot-air balloon from the ancient city of Petra in Jordan that had the decal of Sheikh Zayed printed on it. The Abu Dhabi Police, the primary law enforcement agency of the Emirate of Abu Dhabi set a new Guinness World Record with unveiling a fleet of 200 GMC SUVs. Dubai-based real estate developer and management company, the Wasl Asset Management Group, broke the Guinness World Records title for the largest aerial projection screen, which took to the skies in celebration of the ‘Year of Zayed 2018’. Abu Dhabi University and Knowledge Group broke the Guinness World Record by creating the world's largest notebook mosaic logo of Year of Zayed using 25,000 notebooks. Director of the Dubai Office at the Ministry of Foreign Affairs and International Cooperation, Abdulrahman Ghanem Al Mutaiwee, alongside the British Consul-General to Dubai, Paul Fox planted the Ghaf tree in the latter's residence.

The Emirati delegation led by two nationals in the Explorer's Passage to Antarctica, member of the Adventure Travel Trade Association (ATTA) and in partnership with polar explorers Robert and Barney Swan and their 2041 Foundation, observed the Year of Zayed in the continent. Dubai-based Khaleej Times marked its 40th anniversary. The Ousha bint Hussein Cultural Center in cooperation with Zayed University, held the Zayed Al Khair Exhibition (lit. Zaid the Good) at the campus in Dubai. Thumbay Hospital in Ajman launches Smiles Card initiative to benefit patients without insurance. The Deanship of Student Affairs of Al Ain University organized a lecture entitled “Sheikh Zayed’s Achievements for UAE Families” in collaboration with Dar Zayed for Family and Care. Etihad Airways unveiled the Year of Zayed special livery aircraft that featured a decal of Sheikh Zayed.

Sheikh Zayed's 100th birth anniversary was observed on 6 May. Emirates landed its six of its special ‘Year of Zayed’ livery aircraft on six continents for the 6 May centennial birthday of Sheikh Zayed.
