= Sultan Al Nahyan =

Sultan Al Nahyan, an Arabic name, may refer to:

- Sultan bin Zayed bin Khalifa Al Nahyan (r. 1922–1926), ruler of Abu Dhabi, Sultan bin Shakhbut grandson
- Sultan bin Zayed bin Sultan Al Nahyan (1955–2019), First Deputy Prime Minister of UAE, Sultan bin Zayed bin Khalifa grandson, son of UAE first president Zayed bin Sultan Al Nahyan
- Sultan bin Khalifa Al Nahyan (born 1965), Emirati businessman and the son of Emirati ruler Khalifa bin Zayed Al Nahyan

== See also ==
- Nahyan (disambiguation)
- Al Nahyan (disambiguation)
- Sheikh Zayed (disambiguation)
- Zayed Al Nahyan (disambiguation)
