= Issa bin Zayed Al Nahyan =

Emirati royal and businessman

His Highness Sheikh Issa bin Zayed Al Nahyan
- عيسى بن زايد آل نهيان
- Born: 23 November 1971 (age 54); Trucial States (now United Arab Emirates)
- Occupation: Real estate developer
- Parents: Zayed bin Sultan Al Nahyan (father); Amna bint Saleh bin Bdoua Al Darmaki (mother)

Issa bin Zayed Al Nahyan (Arabic: عيسى بن زايد آل نهيان,) also spelt as Isa is the son of former United Arab Emirates President Zayed bin Sultan Al Nahyan; the half brother of the former President Khalifa bin Zayed Al Nahyan; and the half brother of President Mohammed bin Zayed Al Nahyan.

Although a member of the royal family and apart from being a prominent real estate developer in the UAE, being the owner of Al Hekma Tower in Dubai, Issa bin Zayed holds no official or political position within the government of the United Arab Emirates.

In April 2009, Issa bin Zayed was subject to a controversy in which a video tape of torture smuggled out of the United Arab Emirates to the United States by two Palestinian brothers, who were his business associates, showed Issa torturing a man with whips, electric cattle prods, and wooden planks with protruding nails and running him over repeatedly with an SUV. Issa bin Zayed was initially put under arrest with the UAE government stating that matters were resolved "privately". One of the Palestinian brothers, Nabulsi, claimed Issa bin Zayed breached his contract and subjected him to torture, emotional distress, and malicious prosecution and demanded $80 million in repatriation. Emirati court found Issa not guilty on the principle of diminished responsibility and instead condemned and sentenced the two brothers for using the video as blackmail and extortion. The court was accused, by international human rights observers, of having failed to deliver justice.

== Early life ==
Sheikh Issa is the son of Zayed bin Sultan. His mother is Sheikha Amna bint Saleh Bin Bdoua Al Darmaki. He has one full-brother, late Sheikh Nasser. UAE presidents Sheikh Khalifa bin Zayed Al Nahyan and Mohammed bin Zayed Al Nahyan are among 19 half brothers of Sheikh Issa.

== Torture incident ==
Issa is the subject of an assault, libel, and slander lawsuit brought on by businessman Bassam Nabulsi of Houston, Texas, a former long-term adviser to the Al Nahyan family, filed on 16 August 2006 in District Court for the Southern District of Texas Houston Division for Assault, Libel, and Slander.

Nabulsi said that he safeguarded Issa's most important documents, including financial records, investment documents and videotapes, which showed Issa torturing a man with a cattle prod and a spiked plank. Nabulsi, who had "smuggled" the tape out of the UAE, was also suing Issa, saying he was tortured by UAE police, after he refused to hand over videos to Issa after a disagreement. Nabulsi also said his brother recorded the tapes as demanded by Issa, who, Nabulsi says, liked to watch them later. The lawsuit was dismissed on 12 June 2009 by district judge Sim Lake for "lack of personal jurisdiction and proper service of process."

In April 2009, an abridged version of the tape was posted by ABC News. In the video, taken at some time in 2005, Issa is shown beating another man, an Afghan grain merchant called Mohammed Shah Poor, with a wooden plank with protruding nails, firing an automatic weapon into the sand around him and forcing a cattle prod into his anus before turning it on. Prior to the abuse, the video allegedly shows a man in Abu Dhabi police uniform (but without his equipment belt) tying the victim's arms and legs; at a later point, Issa urges the cameraman to move in closer with the words, "Get closer. Get closer. Get closer. Let his suffering show." The victim also appeared to have been run over by a Mercedes SUV, had lighter fluid poured on his genitals and set alight, and had salt poured on his wounds. At the end of the video, two other police officers can be seen posing alongside a fully marked ministry departmental vehicle. It is not known if the vehicle registration on the departmental vehicle and the SUV were ever cross-checked to authenticate the involvement of the Sheikh and the government.

Lawyers stated the abuse began because Issa felt he had been overcharged in a grain deal. "Ultimately this video, or certainly large portions of it, will be played in court," said Anthony G. Buzbee, who represents Nabulsi in his lawsuit. The lawsuit, filed pursuant to the Torture Victims Protection Act, also lists Sheikhs Nasser bin Zayed Al Nahyan (since deceased), and Saif, as well as the Royal Family of bin Zayed Nahyan Partnership as defendants.

In a statement to ABC News, the UAE Ministry of the Interior said, it had reviewed the tape and acknowledged the involvement of Sheikh Issa bin Zayed al Nahyan, brother of the country's crown prince, Sheikh Mohammed; the Minister of the Interior is also a sibling of Issa. The Ministry said, "The incidents depicted in the video tapes were not part of a pattern of behavior," the Interior Ministry's statement declared. The government statement said its review found "all rules, policies and procedures were followed correctly by the Police Department."

Responding to the government statement, Sarah Leah Whitson of Human Rights Watch stated "If this is their complete reply, then sadly it's a scam and it's a sham. [...] It is the state that is torturing them, if the government does not investigate and prosecute these officers, and those commanding those officers." In response to the video's emergence, US congressman Jim McGovern called for a freeze on government aid to the UAE, and requested that Issa be refused US visas; in a letter to the secretary of state of the United States, Hillary Clinton, he said: "I cannot describe the horror and revulsion I felt when witnessing what is on this video ... I could not watch it without constantly flinching." Nabulsi has also alleged that he brought the existence of the torture tape, along with the involvement and collusion of UAE police, to the attention of a US official assigned to train UAE police, with little effect. McGovern has also called for an investigation into these allegations, in order to discover when US officials knew about the tape, if they took any action and, in the event that they didn't, why not. "It shocks the conscience," he said.

The controversy over the torture tape has delayed recertification of a US–UAE nuclear power cooperation agreement.

=== Abu Dhabi probe into allegations ===
Abu Dhabi reported on 29 April 2009 it would probe these allegations. Without acknowledging Issa by name, the statement said "the events depicted on the video appear to represent a violation of human rights".

The incident occurred in 2004. It appeared the initial tape could be the beginning of the problem and it was reported on Sunday 3 May that the lawyer for Nabulsi, Issa's former partner, claimed to have "more than two hours of video footage showing Issa's involvement in the torture of more than 25 people." According to the newspaper, police are believed to be seen participating in the attacks and some of the victims are thought to be Sudanese immigrants.

=== Trial and verdict ===
On 14 December 2009 Issa appeared in court and declared he was innocent. The trial ended on 10 January 2010, when Issa was cleared of the torture and rape of Mohammed Shah Poor. Though according to his lawyer, the court accepted that Issa had been a victim of a conspiracy, the judge in fact did not give a reason, as to why Issa was exonerated of responsibility for the abuse. The brothers Ghassan and Bassam Nabulsi were both sentenced in absentia to five years for "drugging, recording and publishing a video and blackmail".

Nabulsi, speaking from Texas, told the Observer of his shock. "I am feeling nauseous. It is really sarcastic. These people, the more they lie, the bigger the hole they are digging for themselves" and called the verdict an insult to justice.

Human Rights Watch, an international rights watchdog group, criticised the United Arab Emirate's trial and called on the government to establish an independent body to investigate allegations of abuse by security personnel and other persons of authority.

The US state department has expressed concern over the verdict and said all members of Emirati society "must stand equal before the law" and called for a careful review of the decision to ensure that the demands of justice are fully met in this case.

== Ancestry ==
Ancestors of Issa bin Zayed Al Nahyan

16. Sheikh Khalifa bin Shakbut Al Nahyan
8. Sheikh Zayed bin Khalifa Al Nahyan
4. Sheikh Sultan bin Zayed Al Nahyan
2. Sheikh Zayed bin Sultan Al Nahyan
10. Sheikh Butti Al Qubaisi
5. Sheikha Salma bint Butti Al Qubaisi
1. Sheikh Issa bin Zayed Al Nahyan
6. Sheikh Salah Al Badi
3. Sheikha Amna bint Salah Al Badi

== See also ==
- Sheikh Zayed bin Sultan Al Nahyan
- Mohammed bin Zayed Al Nahyan
- Khalifa bin Zayed Al Nahyan
