= Mohammed bin Khalifa bin Zayed Al Nahyan =

Emirati politician

Mohammed bin Khalifa Al Nahyan
- Sheikh
- Born: 1972 (age 53–54); Abu Dhabi
- Spouse: Sheikha Al Yazia bint Sultan bin Zayed Al Nahyan
- Issue: Zayed; Hamdan; Sultan
- House: Al Nahyan family
- Father: Khalifa bin Zayed Al Nahyan
- Mother: Shamsa bint Suhail Al Mazrouei
- Religion: Islam

Styles of Sheikh Mohammed bin Khalifa bin Zayed Al Nahyan
- Reference style: His Highness
- Spoken style: Your Highness

Sheikh Mohammed bin Khalifa bin Zayed Al Nahyan (Arabic: محمد بن خليفة بن زايد آل نهيان) is an Emirati politician. He is the son of the previous President of the United Arab Emirates, Khalifa bin Zayed Al Nahyan.

== Career ==
Sheikh Mohammed is the member of Executive Council of Abu Dhabi. He is also on the board of directors of Abu Dhabi Investment Authority

In 2009, he was appointed chairman of Abu Dhabi Retirement Pensions and Benefits Fund.

== Ancestry ==
Ancestors of Mohammed bin Khalifa bin Zayed Al Nahyan

16. Sheikh Zayed bin Khalifa Al Nahyan
8. Sheikh Sultan bin Zayed Al Nahyan
4. Sheikh Zayed bin Sultan Al Nahyan
18. Sheikh Butti Al Qubaisi
9. Sheikha Salma bint Butti Al Qubaisi
2. Sheikh Khalifa bin Zayed Al Nahyan
20. Sheikh Khalifa bin Shakbut Al Nahyan
10. Sheikh Mohammed bin Khalifa Al Nahyan
5. Sheikha Hassa bint Mohammed bin Khalifa Al Nahyan
1. Sheikh Mohammed bin Khalifa Al Nahyan
6. Sheikh Suhail Al Mazrouei
3. Sheikha Shamsa bint Suhail Al Mazrouei
