= Hassa bint Mohammed Al Nahyan =

Consort of the first president of the UAE

- Born: 17 June 1922
- Died: 28 January 2018 (aged 95); Al Ain
- Burial: Al Ain
- Spouse: Zayed bin Sultan Al Nahyan
- Issue: Khalifa bin Zayed Al Nahyan
- Father: Mohammed bin Khalifa Al Nahyan
- Mother: Hassa bint Saqr Al Nahyan

Sheikha Hassa bint Mohammed bin Khalifa Al Nahyan (Arabic: الشيخة حـصـة بـنت محمـد بن خليفة آل نهيـان; 17 June 1922 – 28 January 2018) was the first wife of the founder and the first President of the United Arab Emirates, the Emir of Abu Dhabi, Sheikh Zayed bin Sultan Al Nahyan.

She was the mother of the former president of UAE and emir of Abu Dhabi, Sheikh Khalifa II (7 September 1948 – 13 May 2022). Her father was Sheikh Mohammed bin Khalifa Al Nahyan, who was a first cousin of her husband and also was a senior figure of the House of Al Nahyan, until his death in 1979. Her mother was Sheikha Hassa bint Saqr Al Nahyan, who was also another first cousin of Sheikh Zayed himself. Therefore, Sheikha Hassa bint Mohammed and her husband Sheikh Zayed were double first cousins once removed.

== Ancestry ==
Ancestors of Hassa bint Mohammed Al Nahyan

16. Sheikh Dhiyab bin Isa Al Nahyan, ruler
8. Sheikh Shakhbut bin Dhiyab Al Nahyan, ruler
4. Sheikh Khalifa bin Shakhbut Al Nahyan, ruler
2. Sheikh Mohammed bin Khalifa Al Nahyan
1. Sheikha Hassa bint Mohammed Al Nahyan

== Sources ==
- "Sheikha Hassa bint Mohammed Al Nahyan attends ride". 22 January 2007. Archived from the original on 2 October 2009.
- "SHEIKH KHALIFA BIN ZAYED, PRESIDENT OF THE UAE". Archived from the original on 25 January 2010.
