= Jouan Salem Al Dhaheri =

Emirati politician (1948–2013)

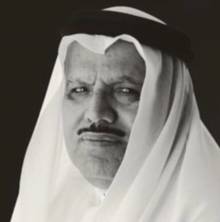
- Jouan Salem Al Dhaheri
- Born: 1 January 1948; Al Ain, Trucial States
- Died: 27 April 2013 (aged 65); Abu Dhabi, United Arab Emirates

Supreme Petroleum Council

Secretary General
- In office 21 June 2011 – 27 April 2013 (Died in office)
- President: Khalifa bin Zayed Al Nahyan

Jouan Salem Al Dhaheri (Arabic: جوعان سالم علي الظاهري) (January 1948 – 27 April 2013) was an Emirati politician. He served as the secretary general and member of the Supreme Petroleum Council alongside both the crown prince of Abu Dhabi and the president of United Arab Emirates. He served on the Board of Etihad Airways and National Bank of Abu Dhabi. He was also the bank’s chairman of the Executive Committee and member of Risk Management Committee. Al Dhaheri was also a board member, director of the Abu Dhabi Investment Authority.

== Career ==
Al Dhaheri served on several Abu Dhabi entities including the Executive Council, the Supreme Petroleum Council, Abu Dhabi Department of Finance and Abu Dhabi, Department of Municipal Affairs, and Abu Dhabi Investment Authority (ADIA). In March 2006, Al Dhaheri was appointed as the chairman of Abu Dhabi Municipalities and Agriculture Department by Amiri decree. As one of the oldest and longest serving government officials at the time of his death, Al Dhaheri had held various ministerial and government positions. He was most known for his roles in the Supreme Petroleum Council where he served as a secretary general, as minister of state, and advisor to the late Sheikh Khalifa, president of the United Arab Emirates.

== Death ==
On 27 April 2013, Al Dhaheri died at the age of 65. Al Dhaheri was posthumously awarded the Presidential Appreciation Award by Sheikh Khalifa for his contributions and services to the emirates. In January 2014, National Bank of Abu Dhabi and INSEAD launched the Jouan Al Dhaheri scholarship in honor of Al Dhaheri's services to the financial and banking sector as well as the development of United Arab Emirates economy.
