= Mohammed Al Nahyan =

Mohammed Al Nahyan may refer to any person in Al Nahyan, royal house of Abu Dhabi with Mohammed given name:

- Mohammed bin Zayed Al Nahyan (born 1961), Crown Prince of Abu Dhabi and younger brother of the current UAE President and ruler of Abu Dhabi, Khalifa bin Zayed Al Nahyan
- Muhammad bin Shakhbut Al Nahyan, ruler of Abu Dhabi from 1816 to 1818, brother of the current UAE President's great-great grandfather

Mohammed bin Khalifa Al Nahyan is the name of:

- Mohammed bin Khalifa bin Zayed Al Nahyan (born 1972), son of the current UAE President
- The father of Hassa bint Mohammed bin Khalifa Al Nahyan, mother of the current UAE President, and therefore great-grandfather of Mohammed bin Khalifa bin Zayed Al Nahyan (the above)
- Mohammed bin Khalifa Al Nahyan, father-in-law of Sultan bin Zayed bin Sultan Al Nahyan
