= Mona al Mansouri =

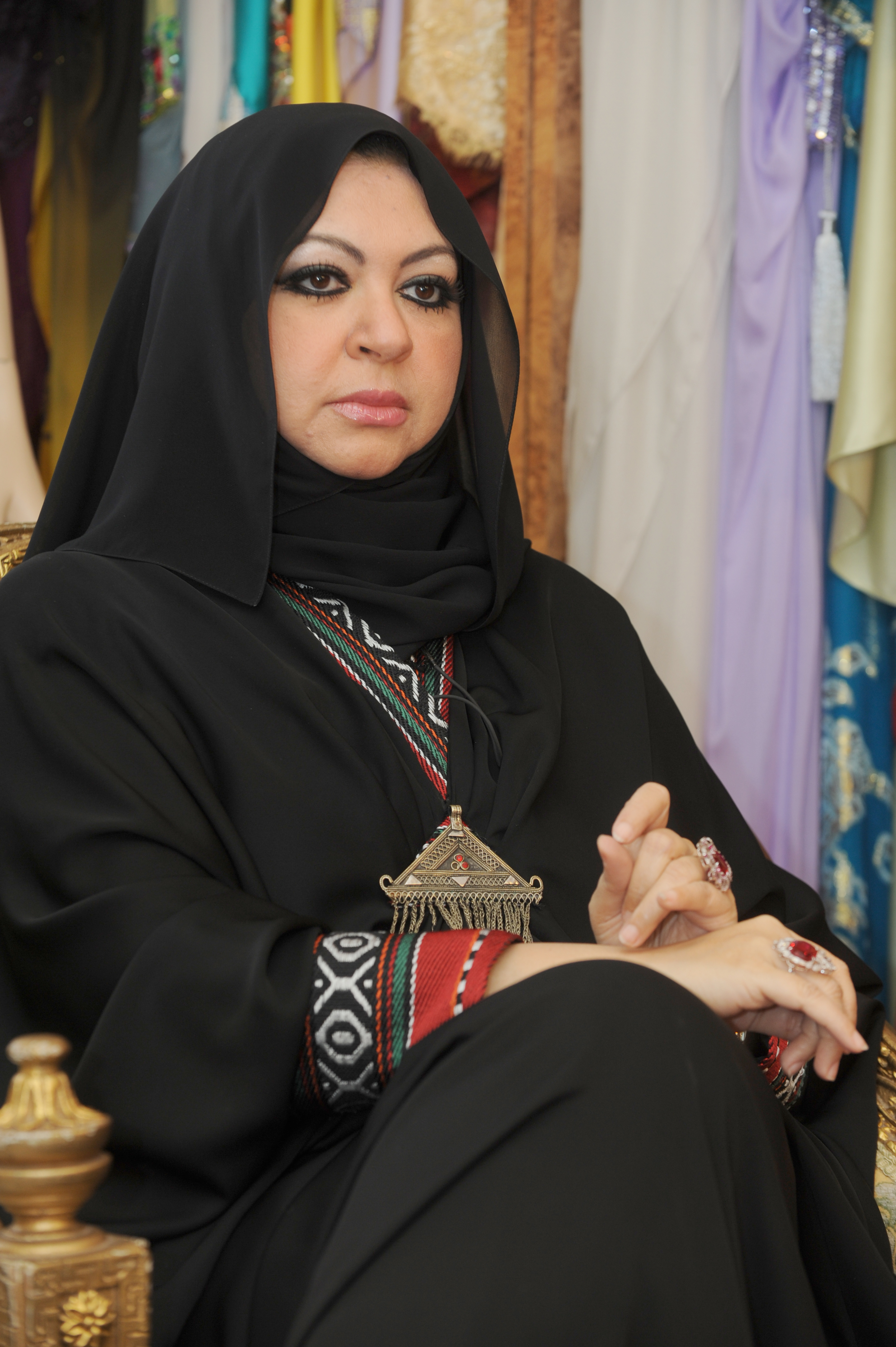
Mona Almansouri, 2011

Mona al Mansouri (Arabic: منى المنصوري) is an Emirati fashion designer, and former engineer. She graduated with a double major in geological and biological engineering. She worked as an engineer in the geophysical petroleum industry. Starting in 1991, she became a fashion designer.

== List of fashion shows ==
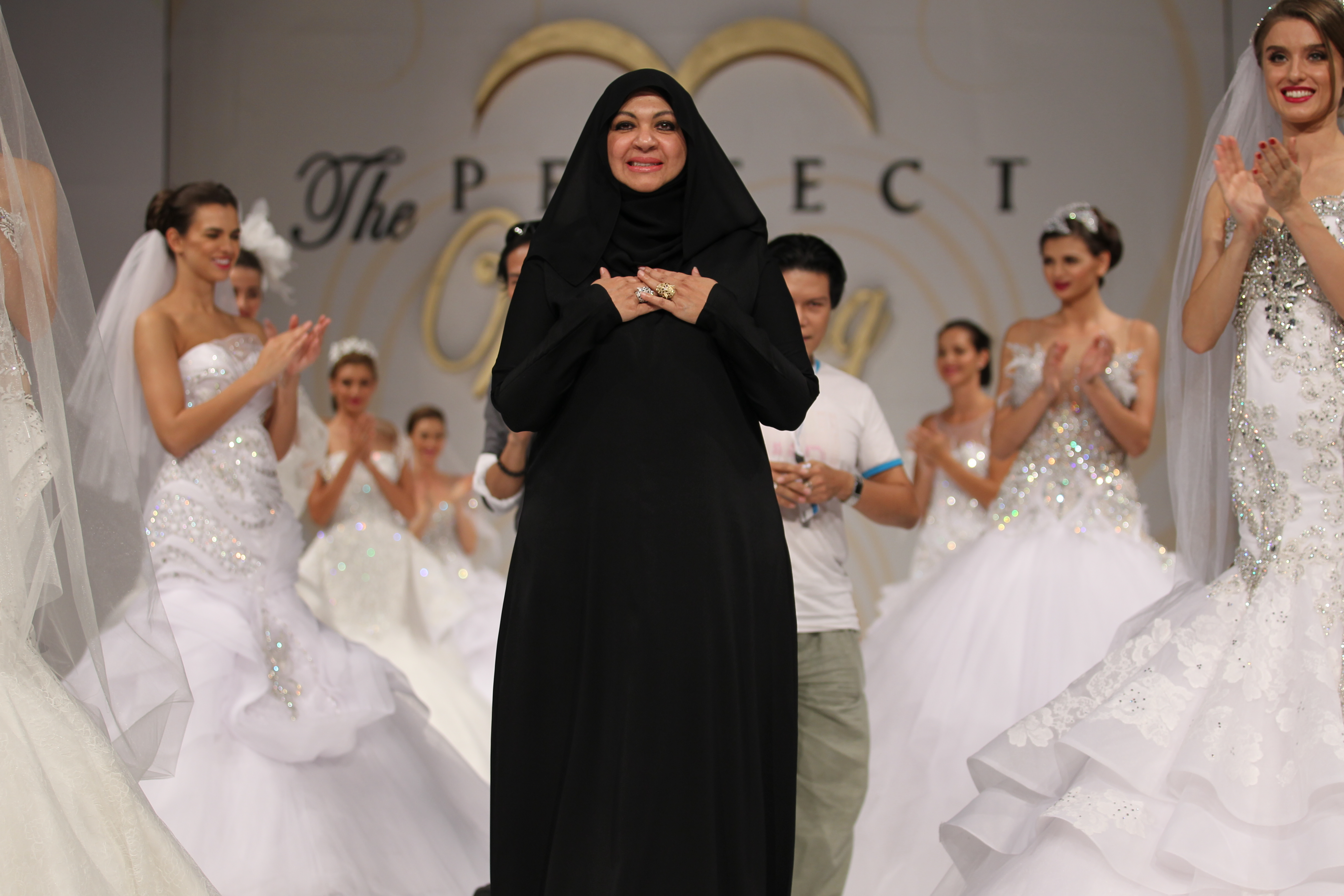
Mona Almansouri fashion show

- Opening the Bridal Fashion Show at the Ajman palace hotel.
- Fashion show in 2014 at Dubai Mall.
- Fashion show in 2014 at Sharjah perfect wedding, this show was named snow queen.
- Fashion show at the Dubai festival city including a dress with a 3D design of Milestones of Dubai on occasion of the National Day and for winning the bid for Expo 2020.
- Fashion show in 2013 at Beirut on the "longest catwalk in the world through Mediterranean Sea", Mona Mansouri opened the fashion week.
- Fashion show in 2012 at Beau-Riv-age Palace, Lausanne, Switzerland under the auspices and in presence of Dr. Sultan Bin Khalifa Al Nahyan on occasion of the National Day and Emirate- Swiss Friendship Council.
- Brides fashion shows in 2010, 2011, 2012 in Abu-Dhabi under the auspices of Sheikha Sheikha spouse of Sultan Bin Khalifa.
- She was invited to Egypt by Egypt Lovers Association, holding a fashion show supporting the vote for Bu Tina Island to be one of the natural seven wonders of the world. Her promotional design for the campaign received a great deal of media attention in Egypt for the innovative idea spotlighting the show.

== Honors and awards ==
She was honored as Designer of the Year 2010, as the designer who was the most influential on the society, from the French magazine l'officiel.
