= Nasser bin Zayed Al Nahyan =

Emirati royal (died 2008)

- Born: 1967
- Died: 2 June 2008 (aged 40–41); Coast of Abu Dhabi
- Burial: 3 June 2008; Al Bateen, Abu Dhabi
- Issue: Ahmed bin Nasser Al Nahyan
Names
- Nasser bin Zayed bin Sultan
- House: Al Nahyan family
- Father: Zayed bin Sultan Al Nahyan
- Mother: Amna bint Saleh Bin Bdoua Al Darmaki

Nasser bin Zayed Al Nahyan (died 2 June 2008) was an Emirati royal and a member of the Al Nahyan family. He was killed in a helicopter crash at age 41.

== Early life ==
Sheikh Nasser was a son of Zayed bin Sultan Al Nahyan, the founding president of the United Arab Emirates. His mother was Sheikha Amna bint Saleh Bin Bdoua Al Darmaki, who is from the Bedouin Al Darmaki family, allies of the Dhawahir tribe. He had one full-brother, Sheikh Isa.

== Career ==
Sheikh Nasser was a security officer, working in the royal bodyguard's office. He was also the chairman of the Abu Dhabi planning and economy department.

== Personal life and death ==
Nasser bin Zayed's son, Ahmed bin Nasser, attended Abu Dhabi Police College from which he graduated in 2010.

Sheikh Nasser died in a helicopter crash off the coast of Abu Dhabi on 2 June 2008. Funeral prayers for him and others killed in the accident were performed at the Sheikh Sultan bin Zayed Mosque in Al Bateen. He was buried at the burial ground in Al Bateen in Abu Dhabi on 3 June 2008.

== Ancestry ==
Ancestors of Nasser bin Zayed Al Nahyan

16. Sheikh Khalifa bin Shakbut Al Nahyan
8. Sheikh Zayed bin Khalifa Al Nahyan
4. Sheikh Sultan bin Zayed Al Nahyan
2. Sheikh Zayed bin Sultan Al Nahyan
10. Sheikh Butti Al Qubaisi
5. Sheikha Salma bint Butti Al Qubaisi
1. Nasser bin Zayed Al Nahyan
6. Sheikh Saleh Bin Bdoua Al Darmaki
3. Sheikha Amna bint Saleh Bin Bdoua Al Darmaki
