= Mouza bint Suhail Al Khaili =

Emirati royal

- Spouse: Zayed bin Sultan Al Nahyan
- Issue: Sheikh Saif; Sheikh Ahmed; Sheikh Hamed; Sheikh Omar; Sheikh Khalid
- House: House of Al Nahyan (by marriage)
- Father: Suhail Al Khaili

Sheikha Mouza bint Suhail Al Khaili is an Emirati royal and one of Zayed bin Sultan's spouses.

== Background ==
Sheikha Mouza is from Hal Bl Khail branch of the Manasir tribe.

== Marriage and children ==
Sheikha Mouza married Zayed bin Sultan Al Nahyan, founding ruler of the United Arab Emirates. They had five sons: Sheikh Saif, Sheikh Ahmed, Sheikh Hamed, Sheikh Omar and Sheikh Khalid.
