= Sheikh Zayed Mosque (disambiguation) =

Sheikh Zayed Mosque may refer to any of the following mosques, being named after Sheikh Zayed bin Sultan Al Nahyan, the first and founding President of the U.A.E.:

- Sheikh Zayed Grand Mosque in Abu Dhabi, the U.A.E.
- Zayed the Second Mosque, Al-Hisn, Abu Dhabi
- Sheikh Zayed Mosque in Fujairah, the U.A.E.
- Sheikh Zayed Grand Mosque in Solo, Indonesia
- Zayed bin Sultan Al Nahyan's Mosque in Stockholm, Sweden
