= Abu Dhabi Crown Prince's Court =

Government body in Abu Dhabi, UAE

The Crown Prince Court logo.

The Crown Prince Court (CPC) (Arabic: ديوان ولي العهد), or the Diwan as it is locally known, is an independent entity that enjoys full legal status as a government body in Abu Dhabi, United Arab Emirates.

== Overview ==
The CPC was established in 1976 and mandated to support His Highness General Sheikh Mohammed bin Zayed Al Nahyan, President of the UAE, Deputy Supreme Commander of the UAE Armed Forces, and Chairman of the Executive Council of the Emirate of Abu Dhabi, in carrying out his national and international duties. CPC facilitates interactions between the Crown Prince and citizens of the UAE through general correspondence, the hearing of individual concerns and the identification of solutions, and manages the public affairs of the Crown Prince, including his involvement in corporate and philanthropic projects.

The Chairman's Office, The Office of the Undersecretary and the General Director's Office form the core of the leadership structure at the CPC. The CPC's three strategic divisions are:

- Citizens’ Affairs Division
- Protocol Division
- Business Support Division

== Management ==
The CPC is managed by CPC's Chairman, Sheikh Hamed bin Zayed Al Nahyan. The Chairman represents CPC on official visits, events and historical occasions, assuming the ceremonial representation of the Court during interactions with local and international officials and public figures.

Reporting directly to the chairman is the Undersecretary of the CPC, Mohamed Mubarak Al Mazrouei, who acts as the chief executive officer. The Undersecretary's role is to determine the strategic direction and the internal policies of the CPC, and supervise its implementation after the chairman's sign-off.

The General Director of the CPC is Jaber Mohammed Ghanem Al Suwaidi. He reports to the Undersecretary and acts as the Chief Operational Officer who oversees the day-to-day operations. The office of the General Director also interacts with all other divisions, sections and units that all fall under the auspices of the CPC.

The chairman, Undersecretary and General Director are supported by individual Executive Offices which ensure efficient facilitation between internal departments.

== Divisions ==
=== Protocol Division ===
The Protocol Division also manages His Highness’ agenda and protocol related requirements. The division also builds bridges of cooperation and close relationships with various Government entities, authorities and non-Governmental organizations within and outside the country.

=== Business Support Division ===
The strategic priorities of the Business Support Division are to adopt the best policies and procedures for support and assistance to ensure the design and roll out of the best in class internal processes.
