= Muhammad bin Shakhbut Al Nahyan =

- Sheikh

Ruler of Abu Dhabi
- Reign: 1816–1818
- Predecessor: Shakhbut bin Dhiyab Al Nahyan
- Successor: Tahnun bin Shakhbut Al Nahyan
- Co-ruler: Shakhbut bin Dhiyab Al Nahyan
- House: Al Nahyan
- Father: Shakhbut bin Dhiyab Al Nahyan

Sheikh Muhammad bin Shakhbut Al Nahayan was the Ruler of Abu Dhabi from 1816 to 1818, now part of the United Arab Emirates (UAE).

Having deposed his father, Shakhbut, Muhammad was himself deposed by his brother, Tahnun (with Shakhbut's support), and exiled.

Muhammad bin Shakhbut Al Nahyan House of Al Nahyan
Regnal titles
| Preceded by Sheikh Shakhbut bin Dhiyab | Ruler of Abu Dhabi; 1816–1818 | Succeeded by Sheikh Tahnun bin Shakhbut |
