= Abu Dhabi Investment Authority =

Sovereign wealth fund

- Headquarters at Abu Dhabi Investment Authority Tower
- Type: Sovereign wealth fund
- Industry: Institutional investor
- Founded: 21 March 1976; 50 years ago
- Headquarters: Abu Dhabi, United Arab Emirates
- Key people: Tahnoun bin Zayed Al Nahyan (Chairman); Hamed bin Zayed Al Nahyan (Managing Director)
- AUM: US$ 1.800 trillion
- Owner: Government of Abu Dhabi
- Website: www.adia.ae

The Abu Dhabi Investment Authority (ADIA) is a sovereign wealth fund owned by the Emirate of Abu Dhabi in the United Arab Emirates, founded to invest funds on behalf of the Government of Abu Dhabi. It manages the emirate's excess oil reserves and is estimated to manage $1.8 trillion. ADIA is one of the largest sovereign wealth funds in the world.

ADIA's operations have been characterized as secretive and opaque.

== History ==
In 1967, Abu Dhabi emirate created the Financial Investments Board which operated within its Department of Finance and was responsible for managing the Emirate's excess oil revenues. However, in 1976, Sheikh Zayed bin Sultan Al Nahyan, the founding president of the United Arab Emirates, converted it into the Abu Dhabi Investment Authority. The goal was to invest the Abu Dhabi government's surpluses across various asset classes, with low risk. At the time it was novel for a government to invest its reserves in anything other than gold or short-term credit. Even today, investment in short-term paper remains the strategy for the vast majority of countries.

In the Bank of Credit and Commerce International scandal of the 1990s, ADIA reportedly lost hundreds of millions of dollars.

The operations of ADIA have historically and to the present been secretive and opaque.

The fund is a member of the International Forum of Sovereign Wealth Funds.

== Investments and strategy ==
ADIA manages a substantial amount of capital and is one of the world's largest investment funds. Due to its size, the fund has been influential in international finance. In 2008, ADIA co-chaired the International Working Group of 26 sovereign wealth funds that produced the "Generally Accepted Principles and Practices of sovereign wealth funds" (known as the Santiago Principles). These principles were created to demonstrate to home and recipient countries and the international financial markets that sovereign wealth funds had robust internal frameworks and governance practices and that their investments were made only on an economic and financial basis.

Today ADIA invests in all the international markets — equities, fixed income and treasury, infrastructure, real estate, private equity, and alternatives (hedge funds and commodity trading advisers — CTAs). ADIA's global portfolio is broken down into sub-funds covering a specific asset class. Each asset class has its own fund managers and in-house analysts covering it. Almost every asset class is managed both internally and externally. Overall between 70% and 80% of the organization's assets are managed outside, and over the last few years, the fund has become more indexed which given its unique asset liability structure is somewhat perplexing. The Abu Dhabi Investment Authority (ADIA) is a major purchaser of U.S. institutional real estate through various sub-entities. It often buys partial interest ownerships with leading real estate managers. ADIA also invests in development projects including malls.

In 2005, ADIA purchased 51 percent of shares of Massar (Company) from Abu Dhabi Power Corporation, a subsidiary of Abu Dhabi Water & Electricity Authority.

Many of ADIA's investments have decreased substantially since investments were made at market peaks in 2007 and 2008. The $7 billion investment in Citigroup has lost approximately 90% of its value as of 26 November 2009, 2 years after it acquired a sizable stake in the bank. Its investments in global real-estate at the market top in 2008 have also decreased substantially in value. Though it talks of its long-term success in generating returns, the fact that it has moved closer to the index and manages most of its funds through external third-party fund managers shows that its tolerance for risk-taking has greatly diminished over the years. However, ADIA's ratio of third-party fund managers is being actively managed. In 2006, between 70% and 80% of the organization's assets were managed outside with an aim to bring that down to between 60% and 70%.

On 27 May 2013, ADIA published its 2012 Review, with an overview of its activities during the past year as well as an explanation of its approach to investing – strategy, governance, and risk management.

In June 2018, ADIA acquired 21.4% of Pension Insurance Corporation Group from J.C. Flowers. In the same year, the fund increased its stake in Axis Bank to 1.19%.

In February 2019, ADIA and Triton acquired 100% of IFCO, each receiving an equal 50% co-controlling stake. In 2025, ADIA agreed to sell their stake to Stonepeak. In 2019, ADIA announced that it would be investing over $1 billion into Saudi Aramco's initial public offering. In 2020 the AIDA disclosed a share of $615 million in Cheniere Energry.

In June 2020, ADIA acquired a minority stake in India’s Jio Platforms, a provider of digital services and mobile networks, for $752.1 million. In October of the same year, ADIA acquired a 1.2% stake in Reliance Retail, an subsidiary of Reliance Industries, for $751.13 million, followed by buying another $598 million stake in October 2023.

In July 2021 made a $500 million contribution to EdgePoint Infrastructure, a telecom tower platform in Southeast Asia. In October of the same year, ADIA took part in a $400 million pre-IPO funding round for the GoTo Group, an Indonesian firm operating across e-commerce, mobility, and digital payments.

In April 2022, ADIA purchased a 10% interest in HDFC Capital Advisors in India from HDFC Ltd for $24.06 million. In 2022, ADIA contributed $2 billion to a data-centre development programme in Asia-Pacific, in a partnership with SC Capital. In March 2023, the fund put $500 million into Indian eyewear e-commerce firm Lenskart.

In June 2024, together with Advent International, ADIA announced the purchase of a minority stake in United States-based Fisher Investments for $3 billion, which they finished in January 2025.

In 2024, AIDA invested $1.7 billion into Fisher Investments together with Lunate, $2.8 billion into Trans-Java Toll Roads with INA and APG, as well as $5.6 billion into NetCo SRL together with CDP Eq and CPP.

In 2024, ADIA acquired a 40% stake in DigitalBridge, a U.S.-based data-centre platform and subsidiary of Landmark Dividend. Later in the year, ADIA bought a minority stake in Qlik Technologies, a U.S. data integration and analytics company, and participated in the recapitalisation of IFS, a Swedish software firm.

ADIA began using a division of data scientists made up of 125 people to assist with in-house investing in November 2024 providing a strategic shift towards private equity and private credits.

In 2025, ADIA was selling mature assets and reallocating funds into growth sectors in an active portfolio re-balancing strategy.

In January 2025, ADIA became a shareholder in Innocap Investment Management, with an agreement permitting it to increase its stake to 10%. In April 2025, ADIA invested ₹26.24 billion in IDFC FIRST Bank in India for a 5.1% stake.

Tawreed Investments is a subsidiary of ADIA that has investments in several Australian infrastructure projects including Queensland Motorways, TransGrid, and WestConnex.

ADIA invested $200 million in to Meril, a medical devices firm, in July 2025 acquiring a 3% stake in the company.

In February 2026, ADIA sold its 50% stake in a Sydney office precinct to Charter Hall, an Australian fund manager, for $351 million.

== Board of directors ==
The board members currently serve for a period of three years and can be renewed. They are appointed by Emiri decree. As of 2023, the board consisted of:

- Tahnoun bin Zayed Al Nahyan, Chairman
- Hamed bin Zayed Al Nahyan, Managing Director
- Khaled bin Mohamed bin Zayed Al Nahyan
- Mansour bin Zayed Al Nahyan
- Khalil Mohammed Sharif Foulathi
- Jassem Mohamed Bu Ataba Al Zaabi
- Hamad Mohammed Al Hurr Al Suwaidi

Former important board members include:

- Ahmed bin Zayed Al Nahyan (1969–2010), appointed as Managing Director in 1997, while still in his twenties. He died in 2010 and was replaced by his half-brother Sheikh Hamed bin Zayed Al Nahyan.
- Jouan Salem Al Dhaheri (1948–2013), appointed in 1977. He served as Deputy Managing Director, Deputy Head of the Investment Committee, and Head of the Audit Committee.
- Khalifa Muhammad Khalifa Al Kindi (born 1959), appointed as Deputy Managing Director in 1997. He served until 2007 when he was dispatched to manage the newly established Abu Dhabi Investment Council (ADIC).
- Ghanim Faris Ghanim Ateish Al Mazrui, former financial advisor to Sheikh Zayed bin Sultan Al Nahyan, and former chairman of ADIA and former director of the UAE Central Bank.

== See also ==
- Chicago Parking Meters
