= Tahnoun Al Nahyan =

Tahnoun Al Nahyan may refer to:

- Tahnun bin Shakhbut Al Nahyan (died 1833), ruler of Abu Dhabi
- Tahnoun bin Zayed bin Khalifa Al Nahyan (1857–1912), ruler of Abu Dhabi
- Tahnoun bin Zayed Al Nahyan (national security advisor) (born 1968), Emirati politician and business executive
