= Dhiyab bin Isa Al Nahyan =

- Sheikh

Sheikh of the Bani Yas
- Reign: 1761–1793
- Predecessor: Isa Ibn Nahyan
- Successor: Shakhbut bin Dhiyab Al Nahyan

Ruler of Abu Dhabi
- Reign: 1761–1793
- Predecessor: position established
- Successor: Shakhbut bin Dhiyab Al Nahyan
- Born: Liwa Oasis (now Abu Dhabi emirate, UAE)
- Died: 1793
- Issue: Shakhbut bin Dhiyab Al Nahyan
Names
- Sheikh Dhiyab bin Isa Al Nahyan
- House: Al Nahyan family
- Father: Isa Al Nahyan
- Mother: Hazza Ibn Ketbi
- Religion: Islam

Sheikh Dhiyab bin Isa Al Nahyan was the Sheikh of the Bani Yas of the Liwa Oasis (Abu Dhabi emirate) from 1761 to 1793 and the founder of the Al Bu Falah dynasty, which still rules Abu Dhabi, the capital of the United Arab Emirates (UAE), today.

== Life ==
Dhiyab ibn Isa, leader of the Bani Yas tribal confederation, sent a hunting party from Liwa in 1761 which tracked a gazelle to a brackish spring on the island. The gazelle became the symbol of Abu Dhabi, and gave it its name (literally Father of the Gazelle). In 1793, Dhiyab ordered his son Shakbut to move to the island. He did and then built a village of some 20 houses and a fort there.

The village expanded quickly, and within two years there were 400 houses on the island, which quickly became the capital of the Bani Yas.

In 1793 Dhiyab visited Abu Dhabi in order to tell a branch of the Al Bu Falah led by his cousin Hazza bin Zayed bin Muhammad bin Falah to stop stirring up trouble with a neighbouring tribe. Hazza, who was in Bahrain at the time, returned and killed Dhiyab during an argument between them. The Bani Yas elders supported Dhiyab’s son, Shakhbut, and Hazza went into exile after his supporters were defeated. Dhiyab's son Shakhbut acceded as sheikh.

Dhiyab bin Isa Al Nahyan House of Al Nahyan Died: 1793
Regnal titles
New title	Ruler of Abu Dhabi; 1761–1793	Succeeded by Sheikh Shakhbut bin Dhiyab
