= Zayed bin Sultan Al Nahyan =

President of the United Arab Emirates from 1971 to 2004

Zayed bin Sultan Al Nahyan; زايد بن سلطان آل نهيان
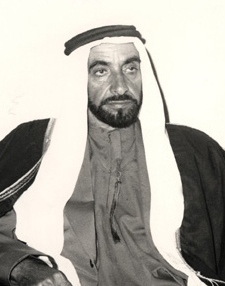
- Sheikh Zayed in 1974

1st President of the United Arab Emirates
- In office 2 December 1971 – 2 November 2004
- Prime Minister: Maktoum bin Rashid Al Maktoum; Rashid bin Saeed Al Maktoum; Maktoum bin Rashid Al Maktoum
- Vice President: Rashid bin Saeed Al Maktoum; Maktoum bin Rashid Al Maktoum
- Preceded by: Position established
- Succeeded by: Khalifa bin Zayed Al Nahyan

Ruler of Abu Dhabi
- Reign: 6 August 1966 – 2 November 2004
- Predecessor: Shakhbut bin Sultan Al Nahyan
- Successor: Khalifa bin Zayed Al Nahyan
- Born: 6 May 1918; Abu Dhabi, Trucial States
- Died: 2 November 2004 (aged 86); Abu Dhabi, United Arab Emirates
- Burial: Sheikh Zayed Grand Mosque
- Spouses: Hassa bint Mohammed Al Nahyan; Sheikha bint Madhad Al Mashghouni; Fatima bint Mubarak Al Ketbi; Mouza bint Suhail Al Khaili; Ayesha bint Ali Al Darmaki; Amna bint Salah Buduwa Al Darmaki
- Issue more...: Sheikh Khalifa; Sheikh Sultan; Sheikh Mohamed; Sheikh Hamdan; Sheikh Hazza; Sheikh Tahnoun; Sheikh Mansour; Sheikh Abdullah; Sheikh Saif; Sheikh Ahmed; Sheikh Hamed; Sheikh Issa; Sheikh Nasser; Sheikh Saeed
Names
- Zayed bin Sultan bin Zayed bin Khalifa bin Shakhbut Al Nahyan
- House: Al Nahyan
- Father: Sultan bin Zayed Al Nahyan
- Mother: Salama bint Butti Al Qubaisi
- Religion: Sunni Islam

Sheikh Zayed bin Sultan Al Nahyan (Arabic: زايد بن سلطان آل نهيان, romanized: Zāyid bin Sulṭān Āl Nahyān; 6 May 1918 – 2 November 2004) was an Emirati politician, philanthropist, and the founding father of the United Arab Emirates. Zayed served as the governor of Eastern Region from 1946 until he became the ruler of Abu Dhabi in 1966, and served as the first president of the United Arab Emirates from its independence on 2 December 1971 until his death in 2004. He is referred in the United Arab Emirates as the Father of the Nation for being the principal driving force behind the unification of the United Arab Emirates.

Zayed replaced his older brother Sheikh Shakhbut bin Sultan as the ruler of Abu Dhabi on 6 August 1966 after Shakhbut was deposed through a bloodless coup by members of the ruling family with British support.

== Family and early life ==
Zayed was the youngest of four sons of Sheikh Sultan bin Khalifa Al Nahyan. His father was the ruler of Abu Dhabi from 1922 until his death in 1926. Zayed was the youngest of his four brothers. His eldest brother, Sheikh Shakhbut bin Sultan Al Nahyan, became ruler of Abu Dhabi after their uncle, Saqr bin Zayed Al Nahyan. His mother was Sheikha Salama bint Butti. She extracted a promise from her sons not to use violence against each other, a promise which they kept. Sheikh Zayed was named after his grandfather, Sheikh Zayed bin Khalifa Al Nahyan ("Zayed the Great"), who ruled the emirate from 1855 to 1909. At the time of Sheikh Zayed's birth, the sheikhdom of Abu Dhabi was one of seven Trucial States along the lower coast of the Persian Gulf. He also showed interest in falconry.

Zayed was born at Qasr Al Hosn, Abu Dhabi, in 1918 and moved from Abu Dhabi to Al Ain in 1926, after the death of his father. As Zayed was growing up in Al-Ain, there were no modern schools anywhere along the coast. He only received a basic instruction in the principles of Islam, and lived in the desert with Bedouin tribesmen, familiarising himself with the life of the people, their traditional skills and their ability to survive under the harsh climatic conditions.

== Career and reign ==
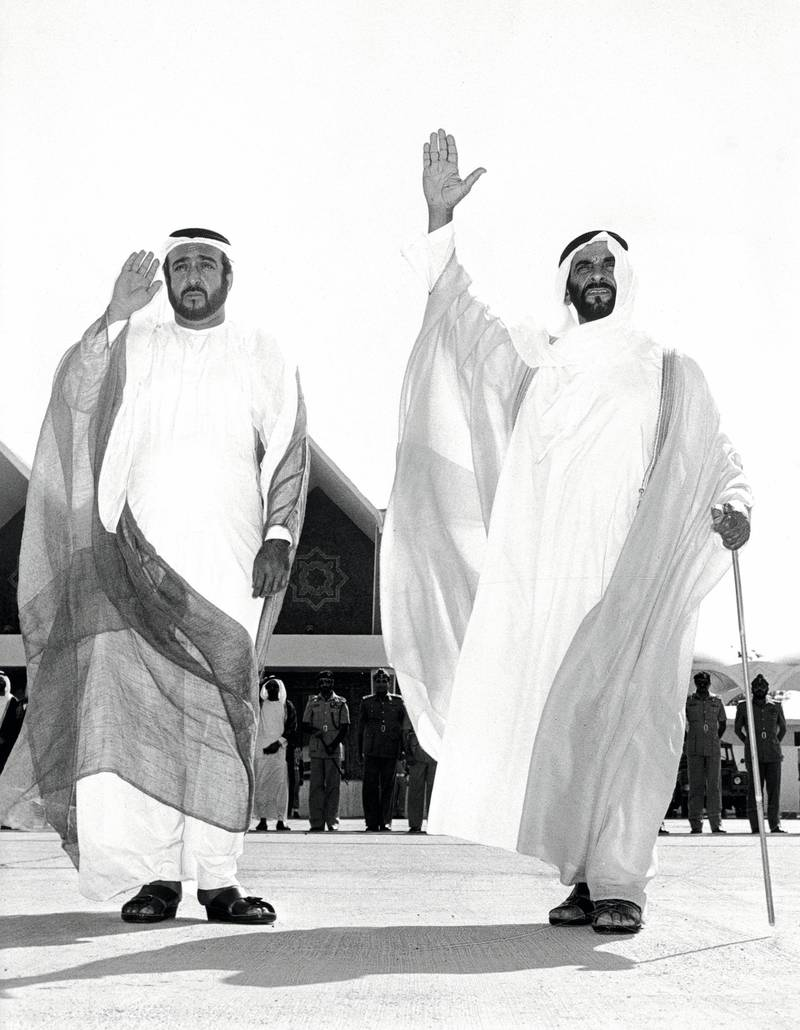
Sheikh Zayed next to his son Sheikh Khalifa in 1971

Zayed was appointed the governor of the Eastern Region of Abu Dhabi in 1946, and was based in the Muwaiji Fort in Al Ain. At this time, the area was poor and prone to outbreaks of disease. When parties from Petroleum Development (Trucial Coast) began exploring for oil in the area, Zayed assisted them.

In 1952, a small Saudi Arabian force led by Turki bin Abdullah Al-Otaishan occupied the village of Hamasa in the Buraimi Oasis (the 'Buraimi Dispute'). Zayed was prominent in his opposition to Saudi territorial claims and reportedly rejected a bribe of about £30 million to allow Aramco to explore for oil in the disputed territory. As part of this dispute, Zayed and his brother Hazza attended the Buraimi arbitration tribunal in Geneva in September 1955 and gave evidence to tribunal members. When the tribunal was abandoned amid allegations of Saudi bribery, the British initiated the reoccupation of the Buraimi Oasis through a local military force, the Trucial Oman Levies. A period of stability followed during which Zayed helped to develop the region and took a particular interest in the restoration of the falaj system, a network of water channels which kept the plantations of the Buraimi Oasis irrigated and fertile.

The discovery of oil in 1958, and the start of oil exports in 1962, led to frustration among members of the ruling family about the lack of progress under Sheikh Shakhbut's rule. Shakhbut was seen as averse to spending revenue from oil money to develop the emirate by other members of Al Nahyan and hence they requested British help to install Sheikh Zayed bin Sultan Al Nahyan as the ruler of Abu Dhabi in his stead through a bloodless coup. On 6 August 1966, Shakhbut was deposed in a bloodless palace coup. The move to replace Shakhbut with Zayed had the unanimous backing of the Al Nahyan family. The news was conveyed to Shakhbut by British Acting Resident Glen Balfour-Paul who added the support of the British to the consensus of the family. Shakhbut finally accepted the decision and, with the Trucial Oman Scouts providing safe transport, left for Bahrain. He subsequently lived in Khorramshahr, Iran before returning to live in Buraimi, Oman.

In the late 1960s, Zayed hired Katsuhiko Takahashi, a Japanese architect, to design and plan the city of Abu Dhabi. Takahashi, working to instructions from Zayed, often marked out in sand with a camel stick, was responsible for a number of key buildings, while also introducing wide roads, the construction of corniches and also greening the city. Another architect, Egyptian Abdulrahman Makhlouf, also worked to render Zayed's instructions into city plans and infrastructural projects following Takahashi's departure.

Between 8–11 January 1968, the UK's Foreign Office Minister Goronwy Roberts visited the Trucial States and announced to its shocked rulers that the United Kingdom would abrogate its treaties with them and intended to withdraw from the area. In a seminal meeting on 18 February 1968 at a desert highland on the border between Dubai and Abu Dhabi, Sheikh Zayed and Sheikh Rashid bin Saeed Al Maktoum of Dubai shook hands on the principle of founding a Federation and attempting to invite other trucial rulers to join in order that a viable nation be formed in the wake of the British withdrawal.

In 1971, after occasionally difficult negotiations with the other six rulers of the Trucial States, the United Arab Emirates was formed. Zayed was appointed to the presidency of the UAE in 1971 and was re-elected on four more occasions: 1976, 1981, 1986, and 1991.

In 1974, Zayed settled the outstanding border dispute with Saudi Arabia by the Treaty of Jeddah by which Saudi Arabia received the output of the Shaybah oilfield and access to the lower Persian Gulf in return for recognising the UAE.

In 1976 he founded the Abu Dhabi Investment Authority, which grew to be the world's third-largest sovereign investment fund by 2020, with nearly a trillion US dollars' worth of assets under management.

In the 1970s, Al Nahyan became the largest investor (holding up to 50 percent of the total shares) in the Bank of Credit and Commerce International, which was used for money laundering and the financing of terrorism and collapsed in 1991, leading to long legal disputes about responsibility.

== Attitudes ==
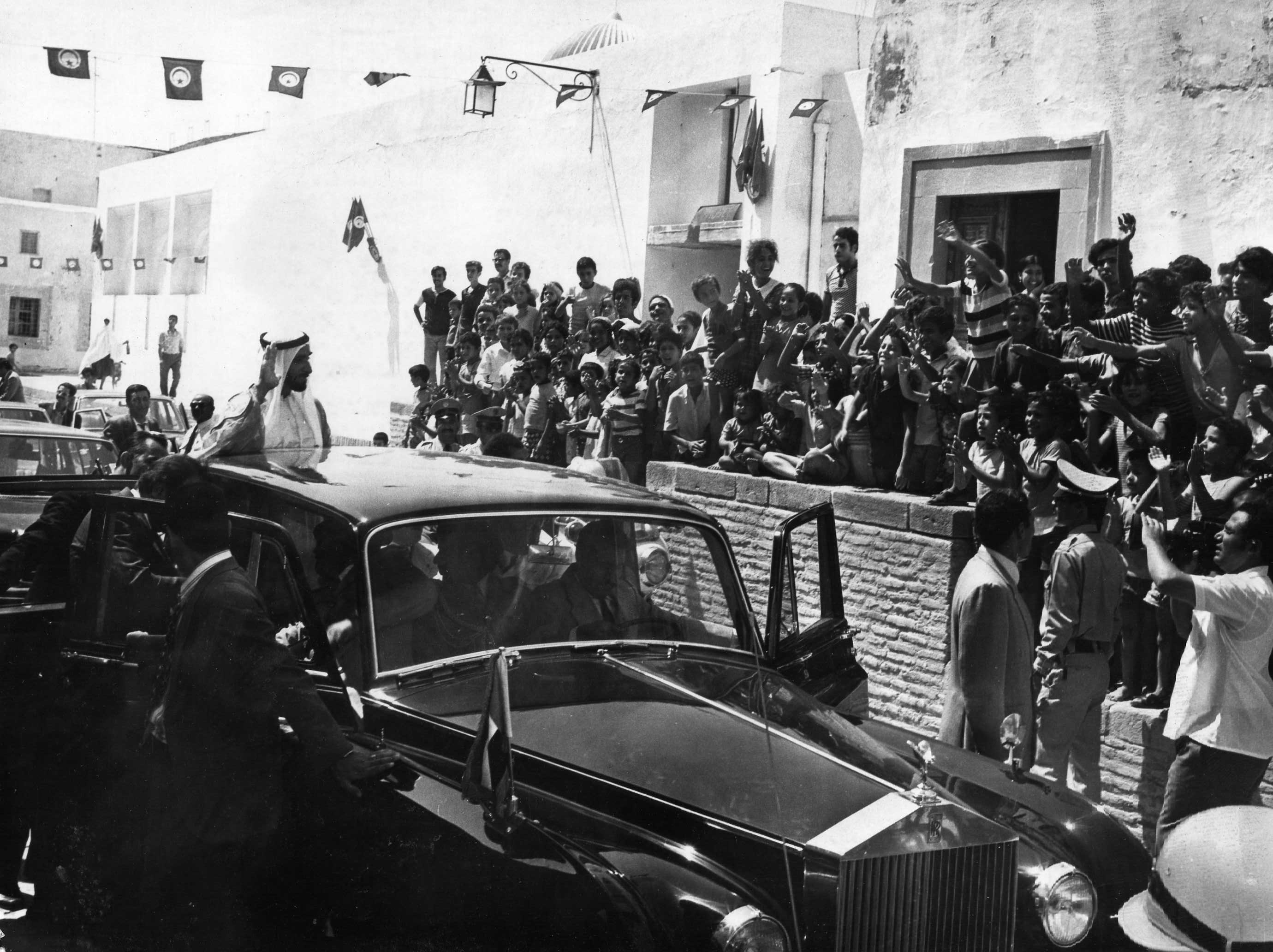
Sheikh Zayed salutes Tunisian crowd during his visit to Kairouan in the 1970s

Sheikh Zayed was determined to unite the Emirates into federation. His calls for cooperation extended across the Persian Gulf to Iran. He advocated dialogue as the means to settle the row with Tehran over three strategic Persian Gulf islands which Iran seized from the (future) UAE Emirate of Sharjah in 1971. The islands remain in Iranian hands, despite over three decades of UAE diplomatic initiatives.

The attitude of Zayed towards his neighbors can best be seen in his position regarding the "Umm al Zamul" dispute (1964), when he expressed a genuine wish that his brother Sheikh Shakhbut would accept "the Sultan's proposal for a neutral zone". He said in that regard: "... it was ridiculous to squabble over a [water] well so bitter that few bedouin could stomach its waters, or to split hairs over a tiny area of barren, almost totally unfrequented desert. And even if there happened to be oil in the area, Abu Dhabi had so much already that she could well afford to spare some for her less fortunate neighbours".

Furthermore, during the negotiations between Abu Dhabi and Dubai that resulted in forming the Abu Dhabi — Dubai Union (which preceded the formation of the United Arab Emirates), Sheikh Zayed was extremely generous with the Sheikh Rashid of Dubai. Kemal Hamza, Sheikh Rashid's envoy to the meeting between Sheikh Zayed and Sheikh Rashid in Sumeih remarked that "Zayed was extremely 'karim' (generous) throughout the negotiations and seemed prepared to give Rashid whatever he wanted". This amounted to Zayed giving Rashid "oil rights in the sea-bed that might be worth millions a year" even at the risk of criticism "at home for giving so much..." It also gave rise to comments that such concessions constituted "an alienation of territory by Abu Dhabi". But the future course of events proved, none of these arguments stood the test of judgment in light of the much higher goal that Sheikh Zayed had in mind, and which in the ultimate analysis amply justified the sacrifices incurred by him. Such concessions are rare in the records of history and news of this generosity travelled far and wide.

He was considered a relatively liberal ruler, and permitted private media. However, they were expected to practice self-censorship and avoid criticism of Zayed or the ruling families. Freedom of worship was permitted, and to a certain extent allowances were made for expatriate cultures, but this did not always sit comfortably in the eyes of the wider Arab world with Zayed's role as a Muslim head of state.

Zayed did not shy away from controversy when it came to expressing his opinions on current events in the Arab world. Troubled by the suffering of Iraqi civilians, he took the lead in calling for the lifting of economic sanctions on Iraq imposed by the United Nations in the aftermath of the Iraqi invasion of Kuwait in 1990, despite Kuwaiti displeasure and opposition.

Zayed was one of the wealthiest men in the world. A Forbes estimate put his fortune at around US$20 billion in 2004. The source of this wealth was almost exclusively due to the immense oil wealth of Abu Dhabi and the Emirates, which sit on a pool of a tenth of the world's proven oil reserves. In 1988, he purchased, for £5m, Tittenhurst Park at Sunninghill, Berkshire as his English home.

== Policies and charity ==
At the time the British withdrew from the Persian Gulf in 1971, Zayed oversaw the establishment of the Abu Dhabi Fund for Arab Economic Development; some of its oil riches were channeled to some forty less fortunate Islamic nations in Asia and Africa during the decades that followed.

In 1970 Zayed donated £50,000 to British politician Christopher Mayhew to establish an Arab Friendship Foundation. He also donated £40,000 to Margaret McKay, then president of the Anglo-Jordanian Alilance, to purchase a house to be used as a cultural and recreational centre for Arab students.

Using the country's enormous oil revenues, Zayed built institutions such as hospitals, schools and universities and made it possible for UAE citizens to enjoy free access to them. In 1959, he founded the Al Nahyaneia Model School, the first formal school in the city of Al Ain. He was also known for making donations to the tune of millions [pounds sterling] for worthy causes around the Arab World as well as in the neighbouring countries and in the world at large.

When asked by The New York Times in April 1997 why there is no elected legislature, Zayed replied,

Why should we abandon a system that satisfies our people in order to introduce a system that seems to engender dissent and confrontation? Our system of government is based upon our religion and that is what our people want. Should they seek alternatives, we are ready to listen to them. We have always said that our people should voice their demands openly. We are all in the same boat, and they are both the captain and the crew. Our doors are open for any opinion to be expressed, and this well known by all our citizens. It is our deep conviction that Allah has created people free, and has prescribed that each individual must enjoy freedom of choice. No one should act as if they own others. Those in the position of leadership should deal with their subjects with compassion and understanding, because this is the duty enjoined upon them by Allah, who enjoins upon us to treat all living creatures with dignity. How can there be anything less for mankind, created as Allah's successors on earth? Our system of government does not derive its authority from man, but is enshrined in our religion and is based on Allah's Book, the Quran. What need have we of what others have conjured up? Its teachings are eternal and complete, while the systems conjured up by man are transitory and incomplete.

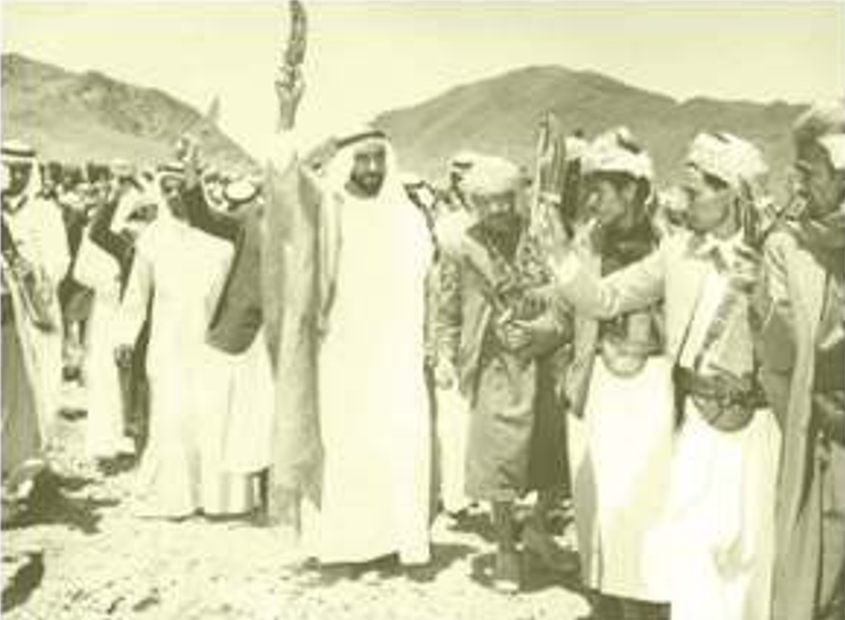
Sheikh Zayed dancing the traditional dance bara'a with a Jambiya along with Yemeni locals in Marib after the reopening of the Marib Dam

Land was also often distributed gratis (free). However, while this policy benefited many landless families, enormously wealthy clans and individuals were given free land grants in proportion to their status and influence with the royal family. His majlis (a traditional Arab consultation council) was open to the public. He allowed non-Muslim religious buildings, such as churches and a temple, to be built. Zayed was also in favour of certain rights for women, such as access to education and women's labour rights, within traditional parameters. His views regarding women's rights were considerably more liberal than his counterparts in the GCC nations.

Zayed was one of the founders of the Dar Al Maal Al Islami Trust which was initiated by Saudi royal Mohammed bin Faisal Al Saud, King Faisal's son, in 1981. After floods ravaged Yemen's Ma'rib Governorate in 1982, Zayed financed the construction of the current dam of Ma'rib in 1984. This was to replace the historical one that was damaged in antiquity, and support the country's agriculture and economy. The area of Ma'rib is reportedly from where his ancestors migrated to what is now the UAE.

== Zayed Centre ==
Controversy over the opinions of the Zayed Centre caused the Harvard Divinity School, after much equivocation, to return/have withdrawn in 2004 Sheikh Zayed's $2.5 million gift in 2000 to the institution, as "tainted money." Former United States president Jimmy Carter accepted the Zayed International Prize for the Environment in 2001. The award included a monetary prize of $500,000 from the Zayed Centre, and Carter stated in his acceptance speech that the award carried extra significance to him, since it was named after his personal friend.

There was similar controversy when the London School of Economics accepted a large donation by the Zayed Centre, to build a new lecture theatre in the New Academic Building in 2008. The gift was accepted with the Sheikh Zayed Theatre being the second largest lecture hall on the campus.

Harvard's equivocation, the Carter controversy, and the engendered negative publicity, prompted Sheikh Zayed to shut down the centre in August 2003, stating that the Zayed Centre "had engaged in a discourse that starkly contradicted the principles of interfaith tolerance."

== Death ==
On 2 November 2004, Zayed died at the age of 86. He had been suffering from diabetes and kidney problems. He was buried in the courtyard of the new Grand Mosque in Abu Dhabi. His eldest son, Sheikh Khalifa bin Zayed Al Nahyan, took an increasing role in government beginning in the 1980s. Directly after his father's death, he became the Ruler of Abu Dhabi, and was ratified as the president of the United Arab Emirates by his fellow rulers in the Supreme Council.

== Memorials and legacy ==
- Zayed University, a government-sponsored higher education institution with campuses in Abu Dhabi and Dubai.
- Shaikh Zayed University, located in Khost, southeastern Afghanistan. It was built with the aid of Sheikh Zayed.
- Zayed National Museum, was named after him
- Sheikh Zayed City in Greater Cairo, Giza Province, Egypt, built depending on a donation from Abu Dhabi Fund for Development, on directions of Sheikh Zayed.
- The Zayed International Prize for the Environment and Zayed Future Energy Prize are named in his honour.
- The Kukës International Airport "Zayed-Flatrat e Veriut" in the northern city of Kukës, Albania, was named after him.
- Shaikh Zayed International Airport (Rahim Yar Khan) located in Rahim Yar Khan, Punjab, Pakistan, is named in his honor.
- In 2024 the Abu Dhabi International Airport was officially renamed Zayed International Airport in his honor.
- Shaikh Zayed Medical College and Hospital located at Rahim Yar Khan, Punjab, Pakistan, was named in his honor.
- Zayed bin Sultan Al Nahyan's Mosque, also known as Stockholm Mosque, in Stockholm, Sweden.
- The Sheikh Zayed Grand Mosque in Surakarta, Indonesia.
- A lecture theater was named in his honor at the London School of Economics.
- A Hafiz School in Gudermes, Chechen Republic, was named in the Sheikh's honor.
- The Sheikh Zayed Arab Falconry Heritage Wing at The World Center of Birds of Prey in Boise, Idaho which was set up through a donation from Sheikh Mohamed bin Zayed, son of Sheikh Zayed.
- The current dam in Ma'rib is also called "Zayed Dam".
- Zayed Town, located in Central Bahrain, was financed by Shaikh Zayed bin Sultan Al Nahyan and named in his honour. The first phase of this township project was inaugurated in 2001.
- A street in Montenegro was named for his memory in 2013.
- Shaikh Zayed Hospital for children and another for women in Larkana Sindh Pakistan.
- Shaikh Zayed Hospital Lahore Punjab Pakistan, Shaikh Zayed Medical Complex Lahore.
- The 5th ring road in Kuwait is now named in honor of Sheikh Zayed bin Sultan Al Nahyan.
- The Sheikh Zayed Tower at the Johns Hopkins Hospital is named in his honor.
- Sheikh Zayed Hospital located at Vushtrri, Kosovo, was named in his honor.
- Sheikh Zayed Institute for Pediatric Surgical Innovation, Children's National Medical Center, Washington, DC.
- Sheikh Zayed Professorship of Cardiovascular Diseases at the Mayo Clinic.
- Sheikh Zayed Children Welfare Centre, a centre for orphaned children located in Mombasa, Kenya.

=== Year of Zayed ===
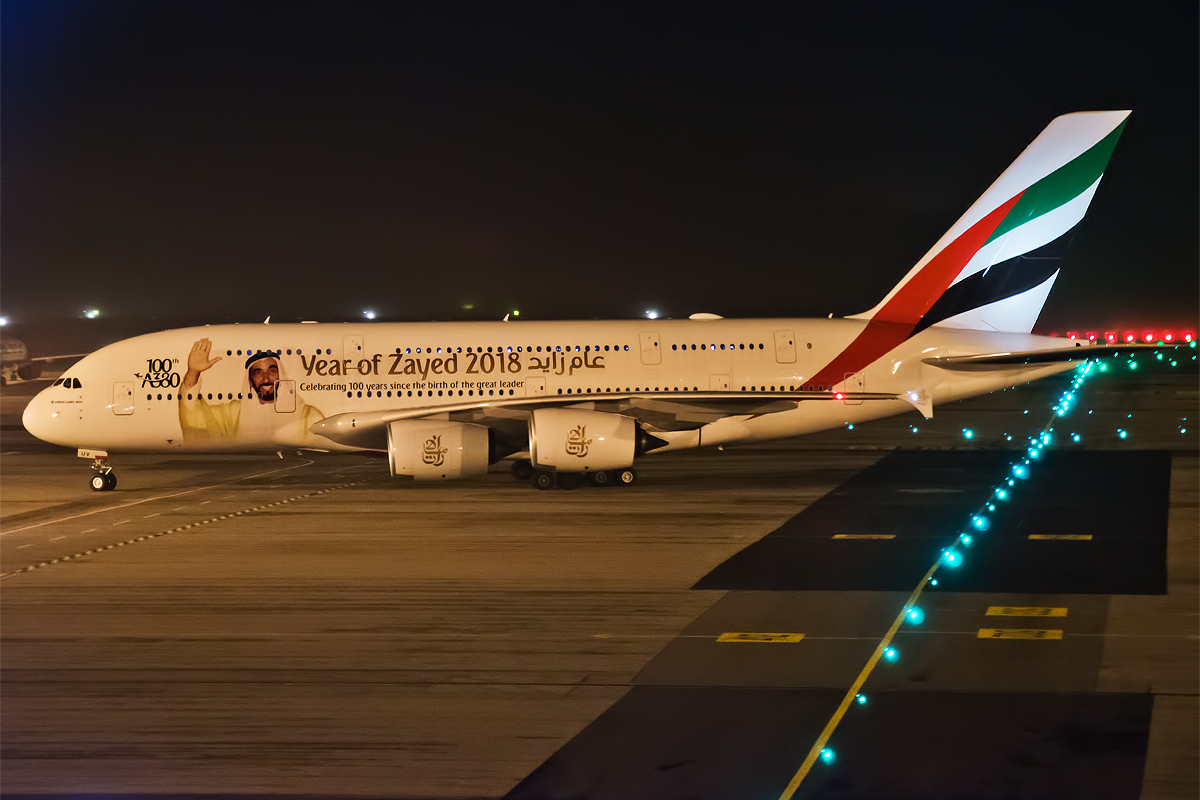
An Emirates Airbus A380 Year of Zayed livery at Milan Malpensa Airport, January 2018

On 6 August 2017, the Emirates News Agency reported that Sheikh Khalifa bin Zayed al-Nahyan, President of the United Arab Emirates issued directives that declared 2018 to be the Year of Zayed in honor of his father, Sheikh Zayed. The declaration came during Zayed's 51st anniversary of assuming the leadership of Abu Dhabi in 1966, who became the ruler by replacing Sheikh Shakbut and was aimed to commemorate centenary birth anniversary of Sheikh Zayed.

=== Founder's Memorial ===
In 2018, a year dedicated in the UAE to the celebration of Zayed's life and legacy, the Founder's Memorial was opened in Abu Dhabi. The memorial consists of an open Heritage Garden and Sanctuary Garden at the centre of which is a cubic pavilion housing The Constellation, an artwork dedicated to Zayed's memory.

== Marriage and children ==
Zayed bin Sultan married seven times and has 19 sons. His 30 children are listed as follows:

Name	Lifespan	Notes
Khalifa bin Zayed Al Nahyan	7 September 1948 – 13 May 2022	Former President of UAE and Ruler of Abu Dhabi; Spouse: Was married to Shamsa bint Suhail Al Mazrouei (b. 1950)
Sultan bin Zayed Al Nahyan	1 December 1955 – 18 November 2019	Former Deputy Prime Minister of the UAE
Shamsa bint Zayed Al Nahyan	1960 (age 65–66)	Daughter of Mouza bint Suhail Al Khaili
Mohamed bin Zayed Al Nahyan	11 March 1961 (age 65)	Current President of UAE and Ruler of Abu Dhabi, current Deputy Supreme Commander of UAE Armed Forces Spouse: Sheikha Salama bint Hamdan bin Mohammed Al Nahyan (m. 1980)
Hamdan bin Zayed Al Nahyan	19 February 1963 (age 63)	Spouse: Sheikha Shamsa bint Hamdan bin Mohammed Al Nahyan (m. 1988)
Hazza bin Zayed Al Nahyan	2 June 1965 (age 61)	Deputy Ruler of Abu Dhabi Spouse: Mozah Bint Mohammed Bin Butti Al Hamed (m. 1988)
Tahnoun bin Zayed Al Nahyan	4 December 1968 (age 57)	Deputy Ruler of Abu Dhabi; Skilled Jiu-Jitsu practitioner and son of Fatima bint Mubarak Al Ketbi. He works in the banking sector. Spouses: Khawla bint Ahmed Al Suwaidi (m. 1997) Latifa bint Jamhour Al Qubaisi
Mansour bin Zayed Al Nahyan	20 November 1970 (age 55)	Vice President of United Arab Emirates Spouses: Alia bint Mohammed bin Butti Al Hamed (m. 1994) Manal bint Mohammed Al Maktoum (m. 2005)
Abdullah bin Zayed Al Nahyan	30 April 1972 (age 54)	Spouse: Sheikha Alyazia bint Saif Al Nahyan (m. 2002)
Al Yazia bint Zayed Al Nahyan	1968 (age 57–58)	Daughter of Fatima bint Mubarak Al Ketbi
Shamma bint Zayed Al Nahyan	1967 (age 58–59)	Daughter of Fatima bint Mubarak Al Ketbi
Saif bin Zayed Al Nahyan	1968 (age 57–58)	Deputy Prime Minister of the United Arab Emirates; Son of Mouza bint Suhail Al Khaili spouse: Sheikha Asma bint Hamad Al Khaili
Ahmed bin Zayed Al Nahyan	(1969–26 March 2010)	Son of Mouza bint Suhail Al Khaili Spouse: Sheikha Alyazia bint Hamad bin Suhail Al Khaili (m. 2003)
Hamed bin Zayed Al Nahyan	1971 (age 54–55)	Chief of Abu Dhabi Crown Prince's Court Spouse: Sheikha Fatima bint Hamad bin Suhail Al Khaili (m. 2002)
Omar bin Zayed Al Nahyan	1973 (age 52–53)	Son of Mouza bint Suhail Al Khaili second deputy president of Baniyas Sports Club Spouse: Ousha bint Nahyan bin Mubarak Al Nahyan (m. 2013)
Afra bint Zayed Al Nahyan	1966 (age 59–60)	Daughter of Mouza bint Suhail Al Khaili
Khalid bin Zayed Al Nahyan	1977 (age 48–49)	Son of Mouza bint Suhail Al Khaili Spouse: Shamsa bint Nahyan bin Mubarak Al Nahyan (m. 2009)
Issa bin Zayed Al Nahyan	1966 (age 59–60)	Real estate developer Spouse: Sheikha Maryam bint Hamdan bin Mohammed Al Nahyan (m. 1990) (c. 1990s)
Nasser bin Zayed Al Nahyan	(1967–2 June 2008)	Former chairman of the Abu Dhabi planning and economy department
Rawdha bint Zayed Al Nahyan	1970 (age 55–56)	Daughter of Amnah bint Salah Al Darmaki
Salama bint Zayed Al Nahyan		Daughter of Fatima bint Obaid Al Muhairi
Saeed bin Zayed Al Nahyan	1965 – 27 July 2023	Spouse: Sheikha Sheikha bint Hamdan bin Mohammed Al Nahyan (m. 1990) (c. 1990s)
Nahyan bin Zayed Al Nahyan	1968 (age 57–58)	Son of Ayesha bint Ali Al Darmaki Spouse: Maitha bint Mohammed bin Khalid Al Nahyan
Falah bin Zayed Al Nahyan	7 November 1970 (age 56)	Son of Ayesha bint Ali Al Darmaki; Spouses: Al-Anood Al Remeithi; Fatima bint Ghanim bin Faris Al Mazroui (m. 2007)
Dhiyab bin Zayed Al Nahyan	1971 (age 54–55)	Son of Ayesha bint Ali Al Darmaki; His name is sometimes transcribed as Theyab Bin Zayed Bin Sultan Al-Nahyan; Chairman of Al Wahda Football Club, former chairman of Abu Dhabi Water and Electricity Authority
Latifa bint Zayed Al Nahyan	1963 (age 62–63)	Daughter of Ayesha bint Ali Al Darmaki
Mouza bint Zayed Al Nahyan	1964 (age 61–62)	Daughter of Ayesha bint Ali Al Darmaki
Wadeema bint Zayed Al Nahyan	1969 (age 56–57)	Daughter of Ayesha bint Ali Al Darmaki
Sheikha bint Zayed Al Nahyan	1974 (age 51–52)	Daughter of Ayesha bint Ali Al Darmaki
Maitha bint Zayed Al Nahyan	1976 (age 49–50)	Daughter of Ayesha bint Ali Al Darmaki

== Ancestry ==
Ancestors of Zayed bin Sultan Al Nahyan

16. Sheikh Shakbut bin Dhiyab, ruler
8. Sheikh Khalifa bin Shakbut, ruler
4. Sheikh Zayed bin Khalifa, ruler
2. Sheikh Sultan bin Zayed, ruler
1. Sheikh Zayed bin Sultan Al Nahyan
12. Khadim
6. Sheikh Butti Al Qubaisi
3. Sheikha Salma bint Butti Al Qubaisi

== See also ==
- Champions of the Earth, 2005 award by United Nations Environment Programme

Zayed bin Sultan Al Nahyan House of Al Nahyan Cadet branch of the House of Al Falahi Born: 6 May 1918 Died: 2 November 2004
Regnal titles
Preceded by Shakhbut bin Sultan Al Nahyan	Ruler of Abu Dhabi; 6 August 1966 – 2 November 2004	Succeeded by Khalifa bin Zayed Al Nahyan
Political offices
New office Foundation of the United Arab Emirates	President of the United Arab Emirates; 2 December 1971 – 2 November 2004	Succeeded by Khalifa bin Zayed Al Nahyan
