= Shakhbut bin Dhiyab Al Nahyan =

Emir of Abu Dhabi in the late 18th and early 19th centuries

Ruler of Abu Dhabi
- Reign: 1793–1816
- Predecessor: Dhiyab bin Isa Al Nahyan
- Successor: Mohammed bin Shakhbut (1st rule) Tahnun bin Shakhbut Al Nahyan (2nd rule)
- Born: Liwa Oasis (now Emirate of Abu Dhabi, UAE)
- Issue: Muhammad bin Shakhbut Al Nahyan; Tahnun bin Shakhbut Al Nahyan; Khalifa bin Shakhbut Al Nahyan; Sultan bin Shakhbut Al Nahyan; Hilal bin Shakhbut Al Nahyan; Yafoor bin Shakhbut Al Nahyan
- House: Al Nahyan family
- Father: Dhiyab bin Isa Al Nahyan
- Religion: Islam

Sheikh Shakhbut bin Dhiyab Al Nahyan (Arabic: شخبوط بن ذياب بن عيسى آل نهيان) was the Ruler of the Emirate of Abu Dhabi from 1793 to 1816, now part of the United Arab Emirates (UAE).

== Political career ==
Sheikh Shakhbut was the eldest son (or brother) of Sheikh Dhiyab bin Isa Al Nahyan who was the leader of the Bani Yas tribal confederation.

In 1761 Shakhbut's father, Dhiyab bin Isa, sent a hunting party from Liwa which tracked a gazelle to a brackish spring on the island. According to legend, the gazelle became the symbol of Abu Dhabi, and gave it its name (literally Father of the Gazelle). In 1793, Dhiyab ordered Shakbut to move to the island; he did, and built a village and fort there near a freshwater spring. The fort, Qasr al-Hosn, became the palace of the sheikhs. It housed the Centre for Documentation and Research for several years, and is now a museum. By Shakhbut's reign, Abu Dhabi had expanded to some 400 houses.

== Successors ==
He was followed by his sons Mohammed bin Shakhbut (ruled 1816–1818), Tahnun bin Shakhbut (ruled 1818–1833), Khalifa bin Shakhbut Al Nahyan (ruled 1833–1845), but co-ruled throughout all their reigns. Hilal and Yafoor are identified as his sons in the 1845 Memoranda on the Tribes of the Arabian Shores of the Persian Gulf of Lieutenant AB Kembal, Assistant Resident at Bushire.

== Legacy ==
He has been described as legendary, and having a notable amount of sons. He was deposed by his son.

Shakhbut bin Dhiyab Al Nahyan House of Al Nahyan
Regnal titles
Preceded by Sheikh Dhiyab bin Isa	Ruler of Abu Dhabi; 1793–1816	Succeeded by Sheikh Muhammad bin Shakhbut
