= Shamsa bint Suhail Al Mazrouei =

Wife of the Ex President Of UAE

- Spouse: Khalifa bin Zayed Al Nahyan (m. 1964; died 2022)
- Issue: Sheikh Sultan; Sheikh Mohammed; Sheikha Shamma; Sheikha Salama; Sheikha Osha; Sheikha Sheikha; Sheikha Latifa; Sheikha Mouza
- House: House of Al Nahyan (by marriage)
- Father: Suhail Al Mazrouei

Sheikha Shamsa bint Suhail Al Mazrouei (Arabic: الشيخة شمسة بـنت سهيل المزروعي) is the widow of Sheikh Khalifa bin Zayed Al Nahyan, President of the United Arab Emirates.

== Family ==
She is the mother of:

- Sheikh Sultan
- Sheikh Mohammed
- Sheikha Shamma
- Sheikha Salama
- Sheikha Osha
- Sheikha Sheikha
- Sheikha Latifa
- Sheikha Mouza
