= Tahnun bin Shakhbut Al Nahyan =

- Sheikh

Ruler of Abu Dhabi
- Reign: 1818–1833
- Predecessor: Muhammad bin Shakhbut Al Nahyan
- Successor: Khalifa bin Shakhbut Al Nahyan
- Died: 1833
- Issue: Hamdan; Saeed; Saqr
- House: Al Nahyan
- Father: Shakhbut bin Dhiyab Al Nahyan

Sheikh Tahnun bin Shakhbut Al Nahyan was the Ruler of Abu Dhabi from 1818–1833. Having deposed his brother Muhammad bin Shakhbut Al Nayhan with his father's support, he ruled in his father's name. Under Tahnun, Abu Dhabi became a Trucial State in 1820, eventually becoming the capital of the United Arab Emirates (UAE).

== Accession ==
Tahnun acceded after having driven his brother Muhammad into exile with his father Shakhbut's support. It was, in fact, Shakhbut who was signatory on his son's behalf to the landmark General Maritime Treaty of 1820 with the British, following the sack of Ras Al Khaimah and bombardment of coastal communities which took place during the punitive British Persian Gulf Campaign of 1819. However, in an 1824 peace agreement with Sultan bin Saqr Al Qasimi of Sharjah over the forts at Buraimi Oasis, it was Tahnun who signed.

== Abu Dhabi attacked ==
The exiled Sheikh Muhammad bin Shakhbut returned to Abu Dhabi in late 1823, together with a force of Manasir Bedouin and sacked the town. He was driven out, with the loss of 35 men, by Tahnun, who had raced from the interior to meet him. Muhammad made for Sharjah, but was followed by Tahnun and his force and Tahnun demanded Sultan bin Saqr of Sharjah hand him over. Sultan was saved the dilemma when Muhammad once again fled into exile.

The British Resident, newly installed at Bushire, toured the coast in 1823 to interview the Trucial Rulers and clarify any interpretation of the 1820 General Treaty. He tried to convince Tahnun bin Shakhbut Al Nahyan, as ruler of Abu Dhabi, to rein in the wild head of the Maharibah tribe, Suwaidan bin Za’al, who, together with his followers, were continuing to commit piracies. As a result of the trip, the Resident recommended a native agent be set up at Sharjah as a local representative of the British - a recommendation that was subsequently followed.

== Buraimi ==
As Abu Dhabi grew, many of its inhabitants maintained links to the inland oasis town of Buraimi (which would in time be split into Buraimi and the Abu Dhabi city of Al Ain) and Tahnun worked to establish his influence there, brokering a peace between the Na'im of the oasis and their breakaway relatives, the Al Nuaimi of Ajman and the Al Bu Shamis. A number of interests jostled for Buraimi, including the Sultan of Muscat, the Wahhabis (who had made a number of incursions) and Sultan bin Saqr of Sharjah, who had established a number of forts in the oasis. Tahnun commanded the loyalty of many of the Bedouin families in the area ('You will be aware that Dhahirah belongs to us' he told the British in 1839) and established his primacy there when, in 1824, an agreement was forced on Sharjah in which Sultan bin Saqr recognised Tahnun's claim to Buraimi and then demolished the forts he had built there.

Tahnun had three sons, Hamdan, Said bin Tahnun Al Nahyan and Saqr.

== Death ==
Mistrusting his brothers Sheikh Khalifa bin Shakhbut Al Nahyan and Sultan bin Shakhbut, Tahnun kept them away from Abu Dhabi but his father persuaded him to let them return. He discovered them plotting to remove him and imprisoned a number of the plotters. This action spurred the conspirators to action and Tahnun was killed by his two brothers in 1833. Khalifa became the next Ruler.

Tahnun bin Shakhbut Al Nahyan House of Al Nahyan Died: 1833
Regnal titles
| Preceded by Sheikh Muhammad bin Shakhbut | Ruler of Abu Dhabi; 1818–1833 | Succeeded by Sheikh Khalifa bin Shakhbut |
