= Hamdan Al Nahyan =

Hamdan Al Nahyan may refer people with Hamdan given name in Al Nahyan royal house, may refer to:

- Hamdan bin Zayed bin Khalifa Al Nahyan (1912–1922) ruler of Abu Dhabi, son of Zayed II
- Hamdan bin Zayed bin Sultan Al Nahyan (born 1963) son of Zayed II of Abu Dhabi, United Arab Emirati politician
- Hamdan bin Mohammed Al Nahyan (1930s–1989?) United Arab Emirati politician
