= Sultan bin Khalifa Al Nahyan =

Emirati royal (born 1965)

- Born: 1965 (age 60–61); Al Ain, Abu Dhabi
- Spouse: Sheikha bint Saif Al Nahyan
- House: Al Nahyan
- Father: Khalifa bin Zayed Al Nahyan
- Mother: Shamsa bint Suhail Al Mazrouei

Styles of Sheikh Sultan bin Khalifa Al Nahyan
- Reference style: His Highness
- Spoken style: Your Highness

Sheikh Sultan bin Khalifa Al Nahyan (born 1965) is an Emirati military officer, businessman and son of the former President of the United Arab Emirates Sheikh Khalifa bin Zayed Al Nahyan.

== Early life and education ==
Sultan was born in Al Ain in 1965. He is the eldest son of Khalifa bin Zayed, former ruler of Abu Dhabi and former president of the United Arab Emirates.

He holds a bachelor's degree in political and administrative sciences, which he received from Emirates University. He also graduated from Zayed bin Sultan Military College in Al Ain in March 1988. Then he attended the Royal Military Academy Sandhurst and graduated in 1989. He received a master's degree in political science from the University of Salford in July 1989. Additionally, he holds two PhDs: one in international studies from the University of Limerick in November 1998 and the other from Nasser Military Academy in the Arab Republic of Egypt in April 1999.

== Career ==
Sultan was promoted to the rank of lieutenant colonel staff pilot in 1999 and then to the rank of colonel staff in February, 2000. He was the advisor to the president of the UAE, Khalifa bin Zayed, and the board chairman of the SBK Holding. In addition, he is a member of the UAE's equestrian federation. He was among the board members of the Executive Council of Abu Dhabi until December 2010.

=== Business activities ===
His firm provides mediation between businesspeople, for instance, between Roman Abramovich and Boris Berezovsky in 2001.

As of June 2024, he is the official club president of Al Qabila Football Club.

== Personal life ==
Sheikh Sultan married Sheikha bint Saif Al Nahyan in 1984. They have seven children together.
