= Zayed Al Nahyan =

Zayed Al Nahyan is an Arabic name, may refer to:

- Zayed bin Khalifa Al Nahyan (1840–1909), ruler of Abu Dhabi (Zayed I)
- Zayed bin Sultan Al Nahyan (1918–2004), Zayed bin Khalifa grandson, ruler of Abu Dhabi, founder and first president of United Arab Emirates (Zayed II)
