= Saif bin Zayed Al Nahyan =

Emirati royal and politician (born 1968)

Sheikh Saif bin Zayed Al Nahyan
- سيف بن زايد آل نهيان
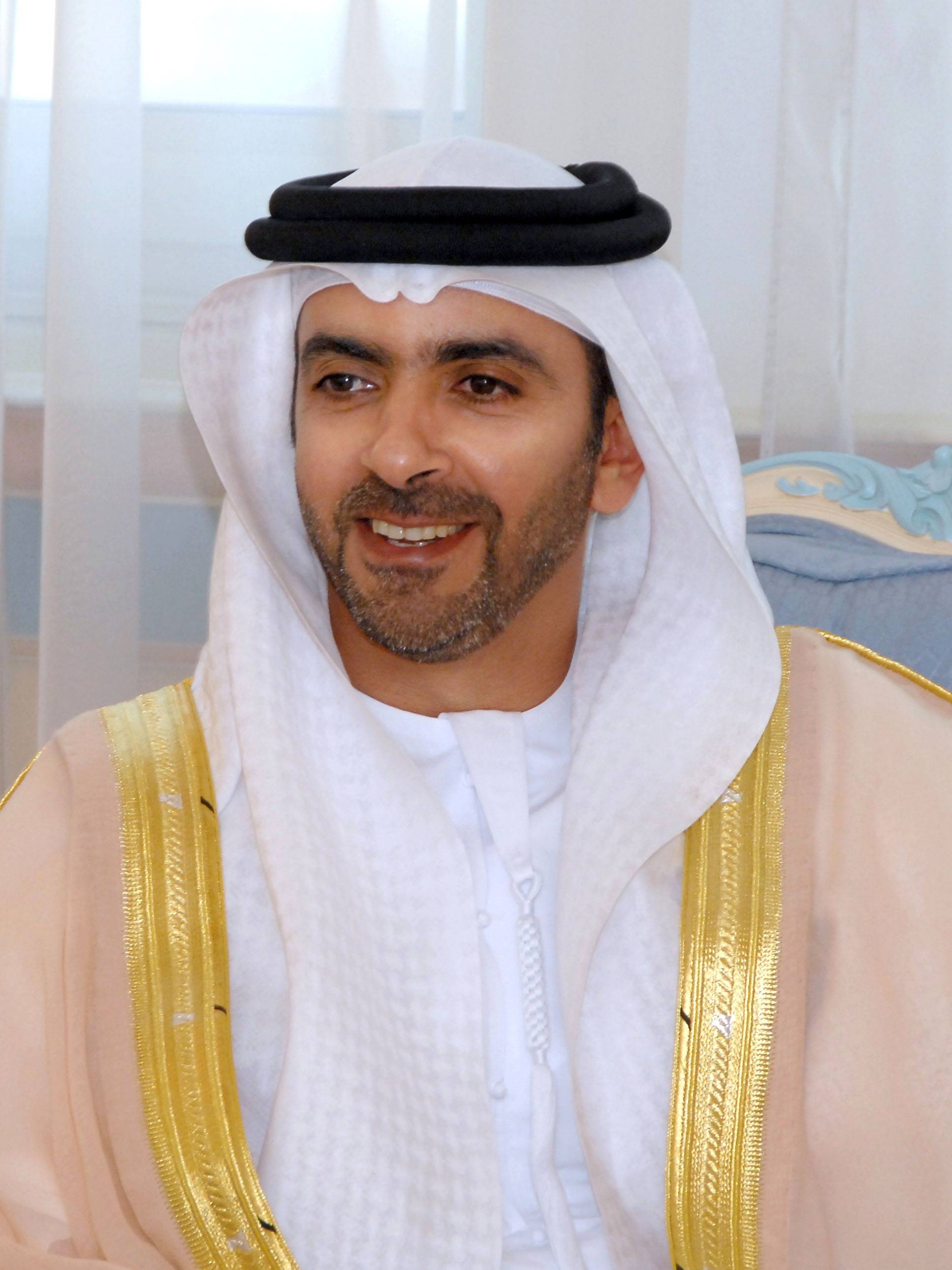

Deputy Prime Minister of the United Arab Emirates
- Incumbent
- Assumed office 10 May 2009 Serving with 4 other people
- President: Khalifa bin Zayed Al Nahyan; Mohamed bin Zayed Al Nahyan
- Prime Minister: Mohammed bin Rashid Al Maktoum
- Preceded by: Hamdan bin Zayed Al Nahyan & Sultan bin Zayed bin Sultan Al Nahyan

Minister of the Interior of the United Arab Emirates
- Incumbent
- Assumed office 1 November 2004
- President: Khalifa bin Zayed Al Nahyan; Mohamed bin Zayed Al Nahyan
- Prime Minister: Maktoum bin Rashid Al Maktoum; Mohammed bin Rashid Al Maktoum
- Preceded by: Mohamed bin Saeed Al Badi

Commander of the Abu Dhabi Police
- In office 1995–2016
- Preceded by: Thani Obeid Khamees Al Rumaithi
- Succeeded by: Mohammed Khalfan Al Rumaithi

Personal details
- Born: 1968 (age 57–58)
- Spouse: Asma bint Hamad Al Khaili
- Parents: Zayed bin Sultan Al Nahyan; Mouza bint Suhail Al Khaili
- Education: United Arab Emirates University (BA)

Military service
- Rank: Lieutenant General

Styles of Sheikh Saif bin Zayed Al Nahyan
- Reference style: His Highness
- Spoken style: Your Highness

Sheikh Saif bin Zayed Al Nahyan (Arabic: سيف بن زايد آل نهيان; born 1968) has been the United Arab Emirates's minister of interior since November 2004 and deputy prime minister since May 2009. As Minister of Interior, he is in charge of the United Arab Emirates interior protection and homeland security. He is a member of the Al Nahyan family.

== Early life and education ==
Sheikh Saif bin Zayed Al Nahyan was born in 1968. He is one of Zayed bin Sultan's many sons. His mother is Mouza bint Suhail Al Khaili. Sheikh Saif attended the United Arab Emirates University in Al Ain and graduated with a bachelor's degree in political science.

He participated in several training sessions, including the special training session for paratroopers in 1991.

== Personal life ==
Sheikh Saif bin Zayed Al Nahyan has been a key figure in the UAE government, serving as Minister of Interior since 2004 and Deputy Prime Minister since 2009.

Sheikh Saif is married to Sheikha Asma bint Hamad Al Khaili, a daughter of Major-General Hamad bin Suhail Al Khaili. They have five children:

- Mouza bint Saif bin Zayed Al Nahyan
- Zayed bin Saif bin Zayed Al Nahyan
- Khalifa bin Saif bin Zayed Al Nahyan
- Ahmed bin Saif bin Zayed Al Nahyan
- Mohammed bin Saif bin Zayed Al Nahyan (born 2 December 2020).

== Career ==
Prior to his ministerial appointment in October 2004, Sheikh Saif occupied several leadership positions. He was the deputy director of the capital police from 1994 to 1995 before becoming the director general of the Abu Dhabi Police on 23 October 1995. On 25 December 1997, he became the Undersecretary of the Ministry of Interior, retaining this post until his appointment as Minister of Interior on 2 November 2004.

On 30 December 2004, he was promoted to the rank of Lieutenant General. In addition, he was appointed Minister of Interior to the government led by Sheikh Mohammed bin Rashid Al Maktoum on the same day. He was named as the Deputy Prime Minister on 11 May 2009, retaining his post as Minister of Interior.

=== Activities ===
His achievement in the realms of police and security includes launching the community police project in 2003, founding the Ministry of Interior's centers for rehabilitating persons with special needs in 2002 and the social support center in 2004. He also directed the five-year plan for the strategic development of the Abu Dhabi Police (2004–2008), the five-year plan for the Ministry of Interior and oversaw the restructuring of the Abu Dhabi Police. Moreover, he sought a permanent solution to the problem of child jockeys in camel races and initiated a number of practical security measures to counter this problem. He also launched the "iris scan" project – which succeeded in preventing more than 114,000 persons from returning to the UAE since the project was implemented nationwide – and launched the project of the Emirates Identity Authority.

=== Recognition ===
Sheikh Saif bin Zayed has received several medals and honors, including the Order of Merit for Dedicated Service in 2000, the Red Crescent Charitable medal, and the Order of Merit of the International Civil Defense Organization, ICDO (Commander Rank).

On 15 February 2010, he was awarded an honorary degree of doctor in the social sciences from the University of Wolverhampton.

== Ancestry ==
16. Sheikh Khalifa bin Shakbut Al Nahyan
8. Sheikh Zayed bin Khalifa Al Nahyan
4. Sheikh Sultan bin Zayed Al Nahyan
2. Sheikh Zayed bin Sultan Al Nahyan
10. Sheikh Butti Al Qubaisi
5. Sheikha Salma bint Butti Al Qubaisi
1. Sheikh Saif bin Zayed Al Nahyan
6. Sheikh Suhail Al Khaili
3. Sheikha Mouza bint Suhail Al Khaili

== See also ==
- Baniyas Club
