= Khalifa bin Shakhbut Al Nahyan =

- Sheikh

Ruler of Abu Dhabi
- Reign: 1833 – 1845
- Predecessor: Tahnun bin Shakhbut Al Nahyan
- Successor: Saeed bin Tahnun Al Nahyan
- Died: 1845
- Spouse: Moza bint Abdullah Al Suwaidi
- Issue: Zayed bin Khalifa Al Nahyan
- House: Al Nahyan

Sheikh Khalifa bin Shakhbut Al Nahyan was the Ruler of Abu Dhabi, one of the Trucial States which today form the United Arab Emirates (UAE), from 1833 to 1845. His bloody accession led to the secession of the Al Bu Falasah and the establishment of the Maktoum dynasty in Dubai.

Khalifa was to establish the tribal confederation in Buraimi that enabled his successor, Saeed bin Tahnun, to cement Bani Yas primacy in the oasis.

== Accession ==
In April 1833, Khalifa took power alongside his brother and co-conspirator Sultan, deposing his other brother Tahnun and killing him in the process. Khalifa was the pre-eminent of the two and Sultan quickly took a subordinate position. Khalifa moved to declare Abu Dhabi in allegiance to the Wahhabi Amir. His rule was almost immediately threatened by a plot to remove him and install a cousin in his place, but he acted decisively and executed three of the ringleaders. A public outcry and the intervention of Sultan stopped him from delivering the same sentence to two prominent merchants and he settled for having one beaten, his property confiscated and exiled to Lingeh.

== Secession ==
This action of Khalifa's led to the secession of most of the Al Bu Falasah section of the Bani Yas during the pearling season of that year, establishing themselves in the town of Dubai to the North of Abu Dhabi. Dubai at the time was a dependency of Abu Dhabi under headman Sheikh Mohammed bin Hazza bin Zaal. Led by Maktoum bin Butti bin Suhail and Obeid bin Said bin Rashid, the migration of some 800 members of the Al Bu Falasah took over the town, with the complicity of Mohammed bin Zaal, at the time consisting of some 250 houses at Shindagha and the Al Fahidi Fort on the other side of the Ghubaiba inlet. The migration would have been an arduous undertaking, and took place over some time throughout and following the pearling season of that year (typically May to November).

Almost immediately afterwards, Sultan bin Saqr of Sharjah led a force to Abu Dhabi, blockading the town. This was followed by the secession of the Qubaisat section of the Bani Yas, who left and settled in Khor Al Adaid. They took up a career in piracy until, in May 1837, Khalifa—with British acquiescence—attacked the settlement and sacked it, filling the wells, destroying the buildings and killing at least 50. While some of the tribe fled to Dubai, Khalifa's treatment of those who returned to Abu Dhabi was indulgent and eventually the secessionists, including their headman, returned under a general amnesty.

== Death ==
In an egregious breach of the Bedouin laws of hospitality, Khalifa bin Shakhbut was murdered by his hosts in July 1845, when he accepted an invitation to a feast on the beach at Abu Dhabi. With most of the inhabitants of the town away pearling or tending the date plantations, his maternal nephew Isa bin Khalid al-Falahi, who had long had designs on power, killed him at the conclusion of the feast.

His death led to a short and bloody fight for the succession, with a number of claimants vying murderously for the position of Ruler. This was brought to an end by two influential leaders of the Bani Yas, Mohammed bin Humaid and Rashid bin Fadhil, who nominated a son of the former leader Tahnun bin Shakhbut Al Nahyan, Saeed bin Tahnun.

Khalifa bin Shakhbut Al Nahyan House of Al Nahyan Died: 1845
Regnal titles
Preceded by Sheikh Tahnun bin Shakhbut	Ruler of Abu Dhabi; 1833–1845	Succeeded by Sheikh Saeed bin Tahnun
