= Khalifa bin Zayed Al Nahyan =

President of the United Arab Emirates from 2004 to 2022

Khalifa bin Zayed Al Nahyan; خليفة بن زايد آل نهيان
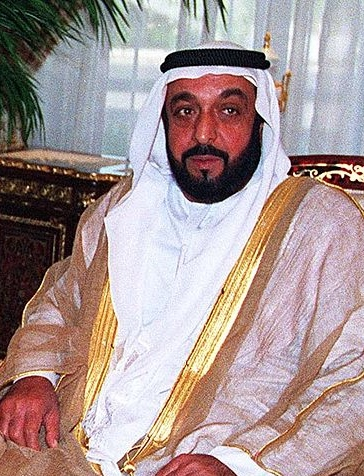
- Sheikh Khalifa in 1997

2nd President of the United Arab Emirates
- In office 3 November 2004 – 13 May 2022
- Prime Minister: Maktoum bin Rashid Al Maktoum; Mohammed bin Rashid Al Maktoum
- Vice President: Maktoum bin Rashid Al Maktoum; Mohammed bin Rashid Al Maktoum
- Preceded by: Zayed bin Sultan Al Nahyan
- Succeeded by: Mohamed bin Zayed Al Nahyan

Ruler of Abu Dhabi
- Reign: 2 November 2004 – 13 May 2022
- Predecessor: Zayed bin Sultan Al Nahyan
- Successor: Mohamed bin Zayed Al Nahyan

Deputy Prime Minister of the United Arab Emirates
- In office 23 December 1973 – 20 December 1977
- President: Zayed bin Sultan Al Nahyan
- Prime Minister: Maktoum bin Rashid Al Maktoum
- Preceded by: Hamdan bin Rashid Al Maktoum
- Succeeded by: Hamdan bin Mohammed Al Nahyan

De facto leader of the United Arab Emirates
- Reign: 1990s – 2 November 2004
- Predecessor: Zayed bin Sultan Al Nahyan (as President of the United Arab Emirates)
- Successor: Himself (as President of the United Arab Emirates)

De facto Prime Minister of the United Arab Emirates
- Tenure: 1978–Unknown
- Predecessor: Maktoum bin Rashid Al Maktoum
- Successor: Unknown

Chairman of Abu Dhabi Executive Council
- Tenure: 20 January 1974–Unknown
- Predecessor: Himself (as Prime Minister of Abu Dhabi)
- Successor: Unknown

Prime Minister of Abu Dhabi (Head of the Abu Dhabi Cabinet)
- Tenure: July 1971–20 January 1974
- Predecessor: Unknown
- Successor: Himself (as Chairman of Abu Dhabi Executive Council)
- Born: 7 September 1948; Al Ain, Abu Dhabi, Trucial States
- Died: 13 May 2022 (aged 73); Abu Dhabi, United Arab Emirates
- Burial: Al Bateen Cemetery
- Spouse: Shamsa bint Suhail Al Mazrouei (m. 1964)
- Issue more...: Sheikh Sultan; Sheikh Mohammed
Names
- Khalifa bin Zayed bin Sultan bin Zayed bin Khalifa Al Nahyan
- House: Al Nahyan
- Father: Zayed bin Sultan Al Nahyan
- Mother: Hassa bint Mohammed Al Nahyan
- Education: Royal Military Academy Sandhurst
- Religion: Sunni Islam

Sheikh Khalifa bin Zayed bin Sultan Al Nahyan (Arabic: خليفة بن زايد بن سلطان آل نهيان; 7 September 1948 – 13 May 2022) was the second president of the United Arab Emirates and the ruler of Abu Dhabi from 2004 until his death in 2022.

Khalifa was the eldest son of Zayed bin Sultan Al Nahyan, the first president of the United Arab Emirates. As crown prince of Abu Dhabi, Khalifa carried out some aspects of the presidency in a de facto capacity from the late 1990s when his father experienced health problems. He succeeded his father as the ruler of Abu Dhabi on 2 November 2004, and the Federal Supreme Council elected him as president of the UAE the following day. As ruler of Abu Dhabi, he attracted cultural and academic centres to Abu Dhabi, helping establish the Louvre Abu Dhabi, New York University Abu Dhabi and Sorbonne University Abu Dhabi. He also established Etihad Airways.

During Khalifa's presidency, the United Arab Emirates became a regional economic powerhouse and its non-oil economy grew. Khalifa was viewed as a pro-Western modernizer whose low-key approach helped steer the country through a tense era in regional politics and forged closer ties with the United States and Israel. As president during the 2008 financial crisis, he directed the payment of billions of dollars in emergency bailout funds into Dubai. On 4 January 2010, the world's tallest man-made structure, originally known as Burj Dubai, was renamed the Burj Khalifa in his honor.

In January 2014, Khalifa had a stroke and was in stable condition after surgery. He then assumed a lower profile in state affairs but retained ceremonial presidential powers. His half-brother Mohamed bin Zayed Al Nahyan carried out public affairs of the state and day-to-day decision-making of the Emirate of Abu Dhabi. In 2018, Forbes named Khalifa in its list of the world's most powerful people. Following his death on 13 May 2022, Khalifa was succeeded by his brother Mohamed.

== Early life and education ==
Sheikh Khalifa bin Zayed was born on 7 September 1948 at Qasr Al-Muwaiji, Al Ain, in Abu Dhabi (then part of the Trucial States), the eldest son of Hassa bint Mohammed Al Nahyan and Zayed bin Sultan Al Nahyan. He spent most of his childhood in Al Ain.

Sheikh Khalifa's early education began with the traditional learning of the tenets of Islam by Sheikh Thani Bin Ahmed, a mutawa (religious teacher). Due to the lack of formal schools in Al Ain during the early 1950s, Sheikh Zayed, Sheikh Khalifa's father, arranged for a qualified tutor from Muscat, Mohammed Bin Rashid Altamimi who then ran a small school in Muwaiji established by Sheikh Zayed around 1956. It was one of Sheikh Zayed's priorities that Sheikh Khalifa and his siblings receive a comprehensive education. Sheikh Khalifa, along with other members of the royal family, continued their early education in the Al Nahyaneia Model School in the academic year 1960–1961, providing encouragement for education in the area. Later, Sheikh Khalifa pursued further academic studies in another school named Alfalah. He later graduated from the Royal Military Academy Sandhurst.

In addition to his formal education, Sheikh Khalifa regularly attended his father Sheikh Zayed's Majlis, where he gained experience in political affairs and governance, preparing him for future leadership. Alongside that, he developed a strong interest in traditional sports such as horse and camel racing.

== Political career ==
=== As ruler's representative and crown prince: 1966–1971 ===
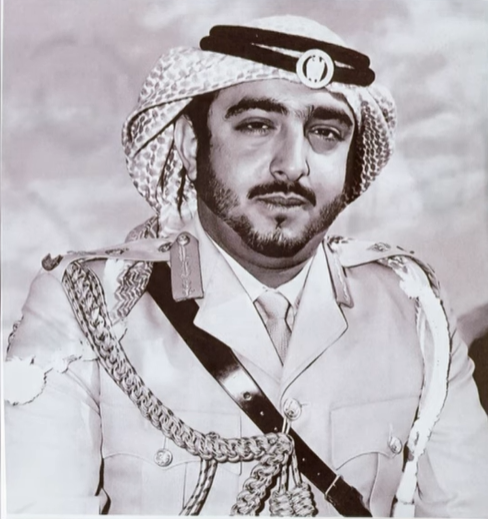
Khalifa bin Zayed in 1971

When his father, Zayed, became emir of Abu Dhabi in 1966, Khalifa was appointed the ruler's representative in the Eastern Region of Abu Dhabi and head of the Courts Department in Al Ain. Zayed was the ruler's representative in the Eastern Region before he became the emir of Abu Dhabi. A few months later the position was handed to Tahnoun bin Mohammed Al Nahyan.

On 1 February 1969, Khalifa was nominated the crown prince of Abu Dhabi, and on the next day he was appointed head of the Abu Dhabi Department of Defense. In that post, he oversaw the build up of the Abu Dhabi Defense Force, which after 1971 became the core of the UAE Armed Forces.

=== As deputy prime minister: 1973–1977 ===
Following the establishment of the UAE in 1971, Khalifa assumed several positions in Abu Dhabi as head of the Abu Dhabi Cabinet. After the reconstruction of the Cabinet of the United Arab Emirates, the Abu Dhabi Cabinet was replaced by the Abu Dhabi Executive Council, and Khalifa became the 2nd deputy prime minister of the United Arab Emirates (23 December 1973) and the chairman of the Executive Council of Abu Dhabi (20 January 1974).

In March 1976, His Highness took on the task of founding with his father and leading the Abu Dhabi Investment Authority (ADIA). This organization strategically oversees the emirate's financial investments with ensuring a stable income for future generations.

In May 1976, he became deputy commander of the UAE Armed Forces, under the president. He also became the head of the Supreme Petroleum Council in the late 1980s. The post granted him wide powers in energy matters. He was also the chairman of the Environmental Research and Wildlife Development Agency.

In 1981, he established the Abu Dhabi Department of Social Services and Commercial Building as well as the Khalifa Housing Fund to help and support constructions of residential and commercial buildings. This initiative sparked construction around Abu Dhabi.

=== As president: 2004–2022 ===
He succeeded to the post of emir of Abu Dhabi and was elected president of the United Arab Emirates (UAE) on 3 November 2004, replacing his father Zayed bin Sultan Al Nahyan, who had died the day before. He had been acting president since his father became ill prior to his death.

On 1 December 2005, Khalifa announced that half of the members of the Federal National Council (FNC), an assembly that advises the president, would be indirectly elected. Half of the council's members were still appointed by the leaders of the emirates.

In 2009, Khalifa was re-elected as president for a second five-year term. He was subsequently re-elected in 2014 and 2019.

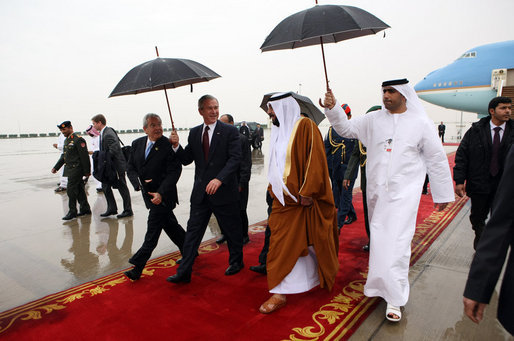
Khalifa and U.S. President George W. Bush at Abu Dhabi International Airport, 13 January 2008

In 2010, Khalifa was described in a WikiLeaks cable signed by then U.S. ambassador Richard G. Olson as a "distant and uncharismatic personage." The cable said that Khalifa had risked his reputation and the UAE's future since 1990, when he described the United States as willing to shed blood to maintain international order and stability in the Gulf.

In March 2011, Khalifa sent the United Arab Emirates Air Force to support the military intervention in Libya against Muammar Gaddafi, alongside forces from NATO, Qatar, Sweden and Jordan.

Khalifa pledged the full support of the UAE to the Bahrain in the face of pro-democracy uprising in 2011.

Later that year Khalifa was ranked as the world's fourth-wealthiest monarch, with a fortune estimated to be worth $15 billion. In 2013, he commissioned Azzam, the longest motor yacht ever built and measuring 590 ft (180 m) long, with a cost between $400–600 million.

In January 2014, Khalifa had a stroke and was reported to have been in a stable condition after undergoing an operation. He was rarely seen in public after, and, with his health deteriorating, his brother, the crown prince, took over as the de facto ruler.

During his presidency in February 2022, the UAE normalised relations with Israel and signed partnership agreements on tourism and healthcare.

== Personal life ==
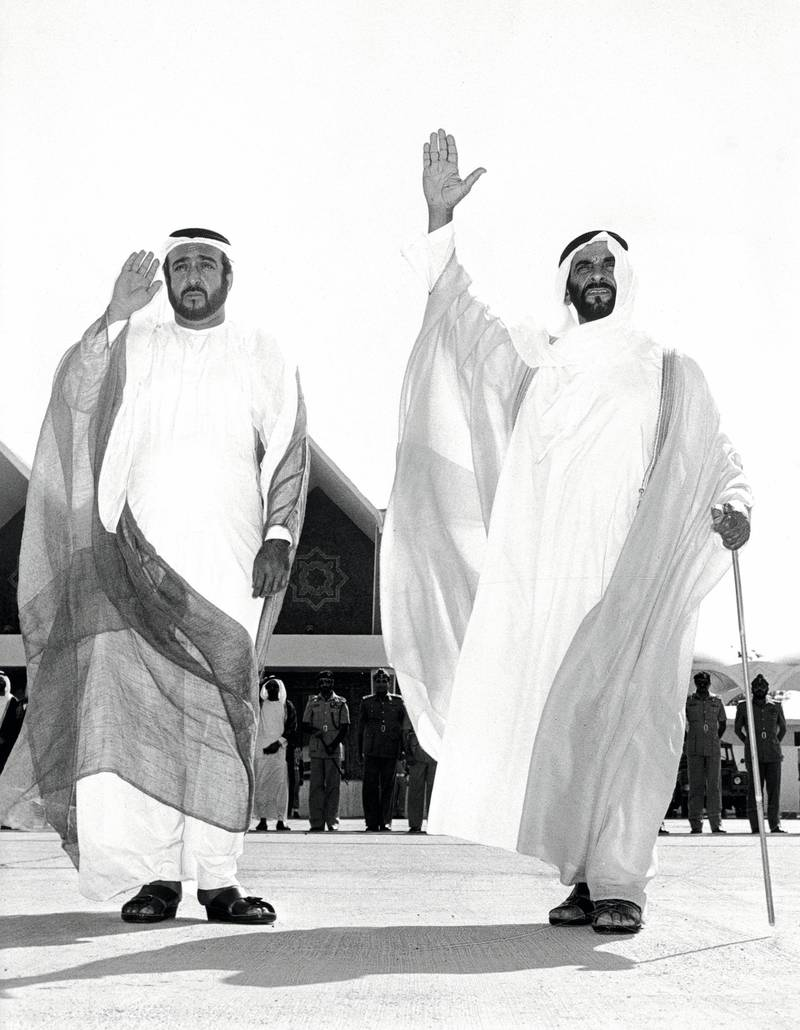
Sheikh Khalifa with his father Sheikh Zayed Al Nahyan in 1971

Khalifa was the eldest son of Zayed bin Sultan Al Nahyan and Hassa bint Mohammed bin Khalifa Al Nahyan. This made him his father's representative, being the eldest son in the family.

He married Shamsa bint Suhail Al Mazrouei on October 18, 1964. Sheikha Shamsa Bint Suhail was from a famous Al Khamis family of the Al Shikr branch of the Mazaria tribe in Liwa. Sheikh Khalifa and Sheikha Shamsa had eight children:

- Sultan bin Khalifa Al Nahyan is married to Sheikha bint Saif Al Nahyan. They have 3 sons and 3 daughters together.
- Mohammed bin Khalifa Al Nahyan is married to Al-Yazia bint Sultan bin Zayed Al Nahyan. They have 3 sons.
- Sheikha bint Khalifa Al Nahyan is married to Hamad bin Tahnoun Al Nahyan. They have 3 sons and 3 daughters.
- Osha bint Khalifa Al Nahyan is married to Sultan bin Hamdan Al Nahyan. They have 6 sons and 1 daughter.
- Mouza bint Khalifa Al Nahyan is married to Khalifa bin Saif Al Nahyan. They have 3 sons and 5 daughters.
- Salama bint Khalifa Al Nahyan is married to Mansour bin Tahnoun Al Nahyan. They have 3 sons and 1 daughter.
- Latifa bint Khalifa Al Nahyan married Diyab bin Tahnoun Al Nahyan in 2012. They have 1 son and 2 daughters together.
- Shamma bint Khalifa Al Nahyan is married to Sultan bin Hamdan bin Zayed Al Nahyan. They have 3 sons.

== Investments and foreign aid ==
Seychellois government records show that, between 1995 and 2010, Sheikh Khalifa had spent $2 million buying up more than 66 acres of land on the Seychelles' main island of Mahé, where what was to be his palace was being built. The Seychelles' government has received large aid packages from the UAE, most notably a $130 million injection that was used in social service and military aid, which funded patrol boats for the Seychelles' anti-piracy efforts. In 2008, the UAE came to the indebted Seychelles government's aid, with a $30 million injection.

Sheikh Khalifa paid $500,000 for the 29.8-acre site of his palace in 2005, according to the sales document. A Seychelles planning authority initially rejected the palace's building plans, a decision overturned by President James Michel's cabinet. A month after the start of construction of the palace, the national utility company warned that the site's plans posed threats to the water supply. Joel Morgan, the Seychelles' minister of the environment, said the government did not tender the land because it wanted it to go to Sheikh Khalifa. Morgan said "the letter of the law" might not have been followed in the land sale.

In February 2010, the sewage system set up by Ascon, the company building the palace, for the site's construction workers overflowed, sending rivers of waste through the region, which is home to more than 8000 residents. Local government agencies and officials from Khalifa's office responded quickly to the problem, sending in technical experts and engineers. Government officials concluded that Ascon ignored health and building codes for their workers, and fined the company $81,000. Ascon blamed the incident on "unpredicted weather conditions". Khalifa's presidential office offered to pay $15 million to replace the water-piping system for the mountainside, and Seychelles' government representatives and residents say Ascon has offered to pay roughly $8,000 to each of the 360 households that were affected by the pollution.

Through the Khalifa bin Zayed Al Nahyan Foundation, the UAE supported the Yemeni people in August 2015 with 3,000 tonnes of food and aid supplies. By 19 August 2015, the foundation had sent Yemen 7,800 tonnes of food, medicine, and medical supplies.

In April 2016, Sheikh Khalifa was named in the Panama Papers by the International Consortium of Investigative Journalists; he reportedly owned luxury properties in London worth more than $1.7 billion via shell companies that Mossack Fonseca set up and administers for him in the British Virgin Islands.

== Death ==
Sheikh Khalifa died on 13 May 2022, at the age of 73. He was buried at Al Bateen Cemetery in Abu Dhabi. His half-brother Sheikh Mohamed Bin Zayed Al Nahyan succeeded him as ruler of Abu Dhabi upon his death, and was elected president of the UAE the next day.

The Ministry of Presidential Affairs announced a 40-day national mourning with flags at half-mast along with a three-day suspension of work in private firms and the official entities at the federal and local levels of institution. State mourning was also announced in many other Arab League nations. Bahrain, Lebanon, Oman, Mauritania, Qatar, Egypt, Morocco, Maldives declared official mourning and flags at half-mast for three days. In Jordan, mourning was declared for 40 days while flags flew at half-mast in Kuwait. Saudi Arabia declared three days of mourning with all recreational, sporting events and festivities postponed. Pakistan announced a three-day mourning and flags were raised at half-mast. Brazil declared three days of mourning, Algeria declared two days of mourning with flags to be flown at half-mast. Palestine declared a day of mourning and ordered flags to be flown at half-mast. India also declared a period of national mourning with flags at half-staff for one day starting from 14 May 2022. Bangladesh declared one day of state mourning on Saturday. Cuba declared one day of mourning on 17 May.

== Sheikh Khalifa Bin Zayed Al Nahyan Mosque ==
In his legacy, Sheikh Khalifa Bin Zayed Al Nahyan Mosque in Al Ain was named after him. The mosque was inaugurated on 12 April 2021.

== Honours ==
Styles of President of the United Arab Emirates
- Reference style: His Highness
- Spoken style: Your Highness
- Alternative style: Ra'is

=== National ===
- United Arab Emirates:
  - Grand Master and Collar of the Order of Zayed

=== Foreign ===
- Brazil:
  - Collar of the Order of the Southern Cross (12 November 2021)
- Kazakhstan:
  - Grand Collar of the Order of the Golden Eagle (17 March 2009)
- Netherlands:
  - Knight Grand Cross of the Order of the Netherlands Lion (8 January 2012)
- Palestine:
  - Grand Cordon of the Order of the State of Palestine (2 May 2010)
- Spain:
  - Knight of the Collar of the Order of Civil Merit (Kingdom of Spain, 23 May 2008)
  - Knight Grand Cross of the Order of Isabella the Catholic of Spain (4 December 1981)
- South Korea:
  - Member of the Grand Order of Mugunghwa (21 November 2012)
- Ukraine:
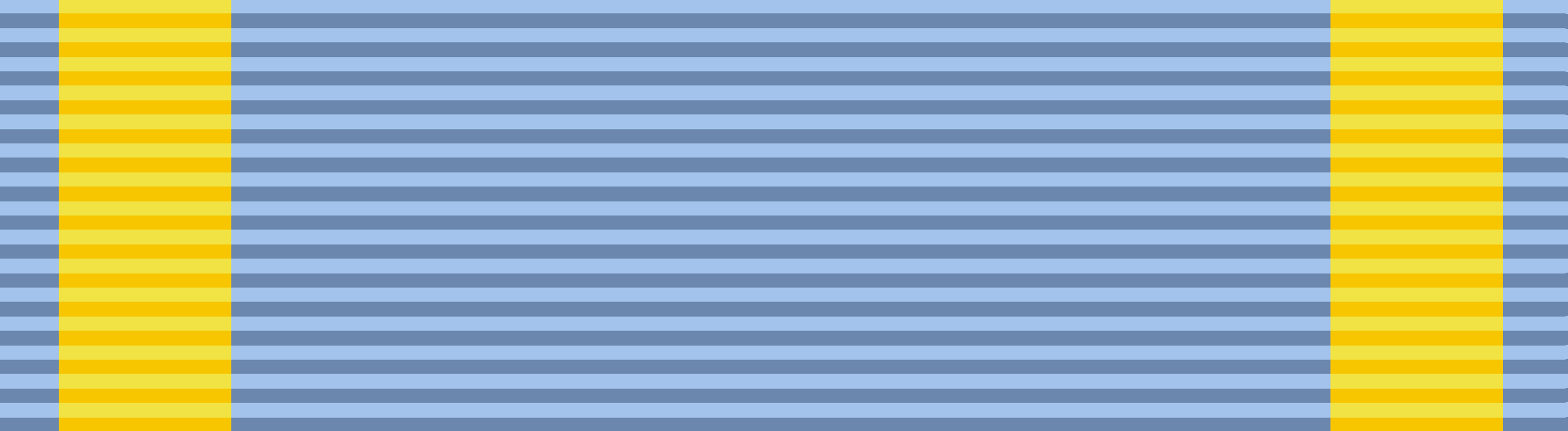
  - Order of Prince Yaroslav the Wise I degree (26 November 2012)
- United Kingdom:
  - Honorary Knight Grand Cross of the Most Honourable Order of the Bath (25 November 2010)
  - Honorary Knight Grand Cross of the Most Distinguished Order of St Michael and St George

== See also ==
- List of rulers of individual Emirates of the United Arab Emirates
- List of royalty by net worth

Khalifa bin Zayed Al Nahyan House of Al Nahyan Cadet branch of the House of Al Falahi Born: 7 September 1948 Died: 13 May 2022
Regnal titles
Preceded by Zayed bin Sultan Al Nahyan	Ruler of Abu Dhabi; 2 November 2004 – 13 May 2022	Succeeded by Mohamed bin Zayed Al Nahyan
Political offices
Preceded by Zayed bin Sultan Al Nahyan	President of the United Arab Emirates; 3 November 2004 – 13 May 2022	Succeeded by Mohamed bin Zayed Al Nahyan
