= 18th BRICS summit =

2026 international summit in India

2026 BRICS Summit 18th BRICS Summit
- 12–13 September 2026
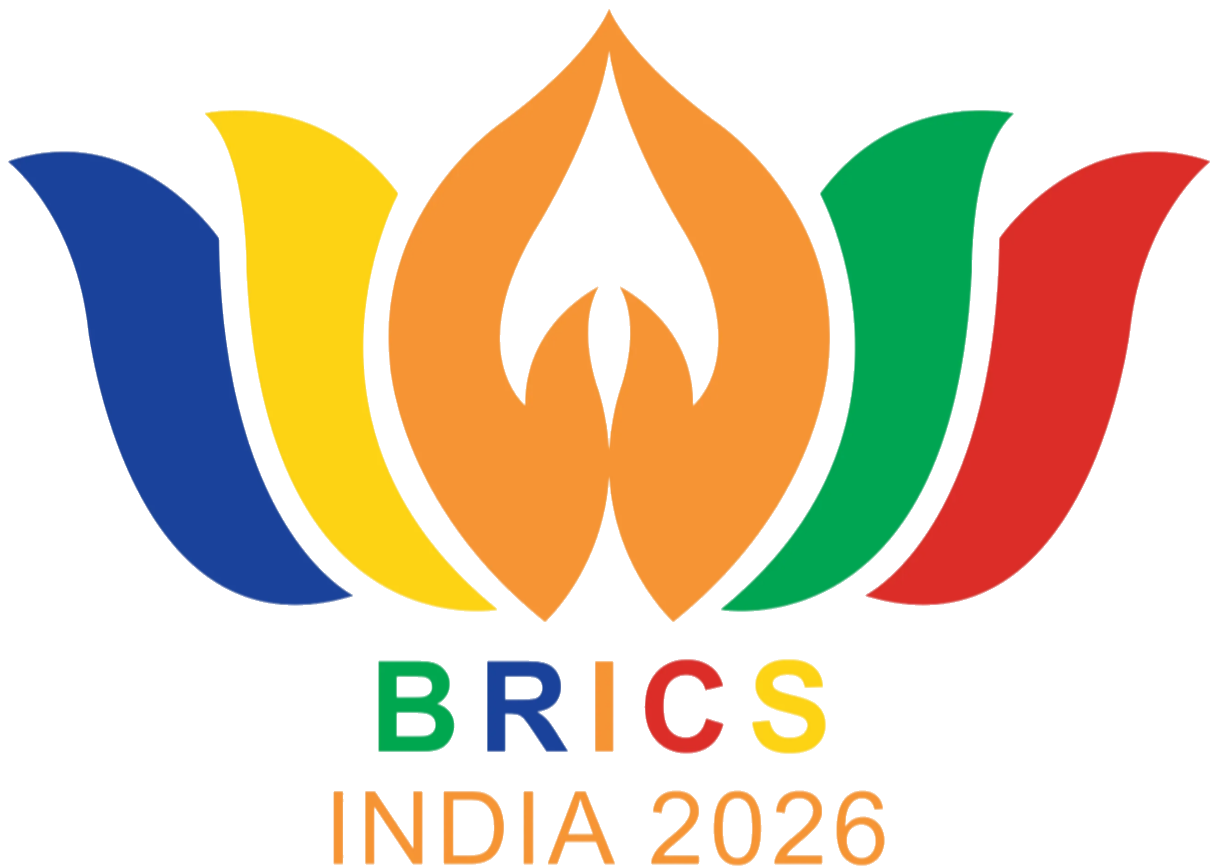

- Host country: India
- Motto: Building for Resilience, Innovation, Cooperation and Sustainability
- Cities: New Delhi
- Venues: Bharat Mandapam
- Participants: Brazil; China; Egypt; Ethiopia; India; Indonesia; Iran; Russia; South Africa; United Arab Emirates
- Chair: Narendra Modi, Prime Minister of India
- Website: brics2026.gov.in

Key points
- Adoption of the New Delhi Declaration; global-governance reform; Middle East de-escalation; trade, payments and development cooperation

The 18th BRICS Summit was held at Bharat Mandapam in New Delhi, India from 12–13 September 2026 under India's 2026 BRICS chairship. It brought together delegations from the BRICS members, partner countries, invitees and several international organisations. The summit was chaired by Prime Minister Narendra Modi and was organised under the theme Building for Resilience, Innovation, Cooperation and Sustainability.

The leaders' summit was preceded on 11 September by the BRICS Business Forum, also held at Bharat Mandapam, while the two-day leaders' programme comprises a closed meeting of BRICS members, an expanded open session with partner countries and outreach participants, a visit to the Bharat Innovates exposition, bilateral meetings and ceremonial events. On 12 September, the BRICS members unanimously adopted the New Delhi Declaration, a 140-paragraph consensus document covering global-governance reform, international conflicts, trade and finance, energy and climate policy, technology, health, agriculture and people-to-people cooperation. However, the wording lacked any mention of the United States despite the BRICS members having been significantly affected by the 2026 Iran war and Trump-led tariffs.

== Background ==
BRICS was formalised through meetings of Brazil, Russia, India and China in 2006 and held its first leaders' summit in 2009. South Africa joined in 2010 and first participated in a summit in 2011. The grouping expanded substantially in 2024 and 2025. By 2026, official BRICS and Indian government sources listed eleven members: Brazil, China, Egypt, Ethiopia, India, Indonesia, Iran, Russia, Saudi Arabia, South Africa and the United Arab Emirates, as well as ten partner countries: Belarus, Bolivia, Cuba, Kazakhstan, Malaysia, Nigeria, Thailand, Uganda, Uzbekistan and Vietnam.

=== Indian presidency ===
India assumed the BRICS presidency on 1 January 2026, succeeding Brazil. India framed its presidency around four priorities represented by the acronym of its summit theme: resilience, innovation, cooperation and sustainability. According to the Indian government, the presidency sought to strengthen institutional effectiveness, advance the interests of the Global South, and promote practical cooperation in development, technology, trade and sustainability.

=== Logo and official website ===
The Government of India launched the official logo and website for the BRICS 2026 presidency, on 13 January 2026, marking the formal commencement of preparations for the summit.

== Venue ==
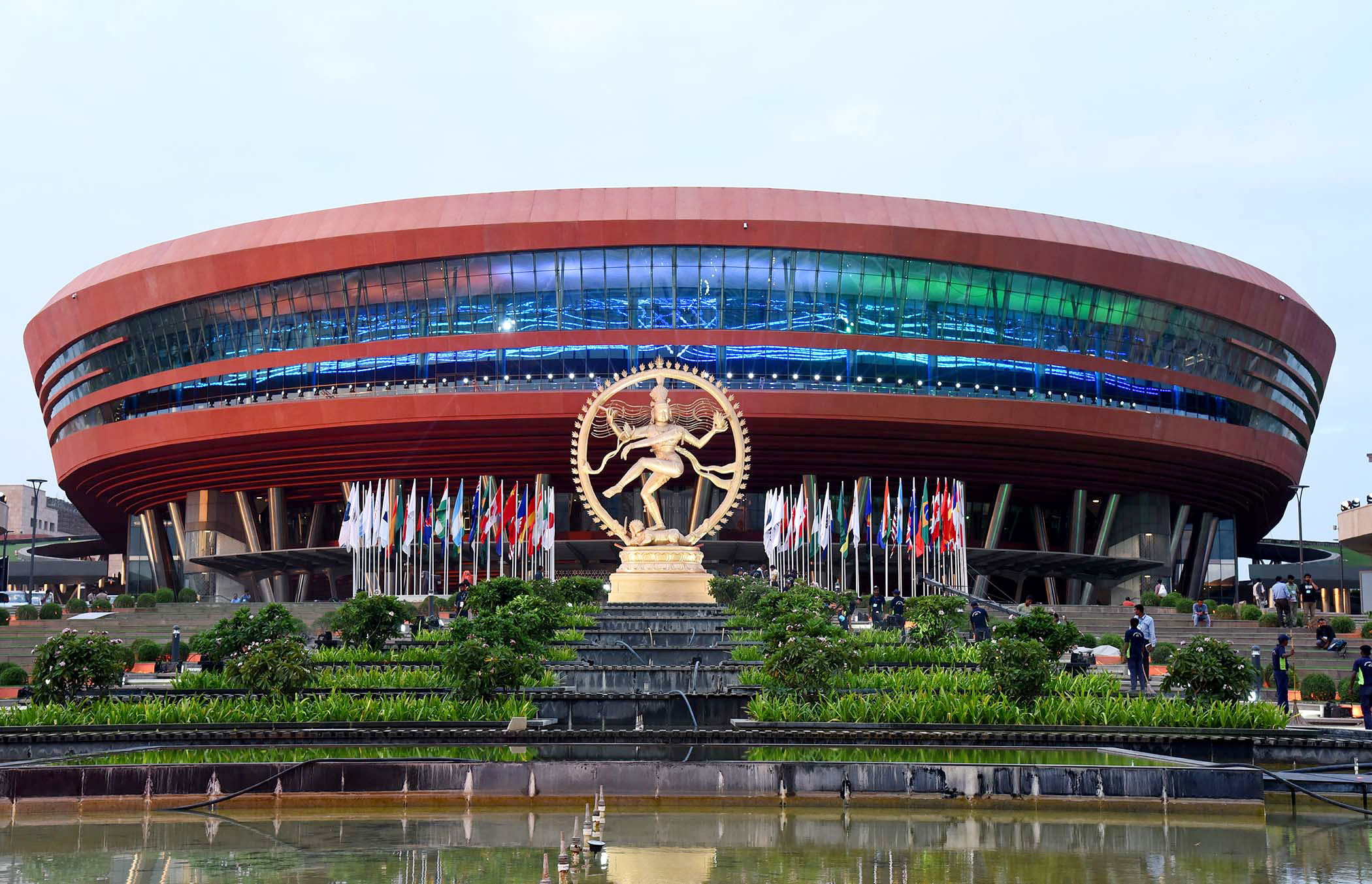
Bharat Mandapam at Pragati Maidan, venue of the summit

The summit was held at Bharat Mandapam, the International Exhibition-cum-Convention Centre at Pragati Maidan in New Delhi. The complex was inaugurated in July 2023 and was subsequently the venue of the 2023 G20 New Delhi summit.

The convention centre can accommodate up to 7,000 delegates in a single configuration and contains plenary, multipurpose and meeting halls as well as dedicated VIP facilities.

== Programme ==
=== BRICS Business Forum ===
Group photograph of leaders and delegates at BRICS Business Forum 2026, New Delhi, India.

The BRICS Business Forum was held at Bharat Mandapam, New Delhi on 11 September, on the eve of the leaders' summit. It brought together representatives of governments, businesses, financial institutions, startups, the BRICS Business Council and the BRICS Women's Business Alliance from member and partner countries.

The forum's programme consisted of five sectoral panels followed by a leaders' session.

At the leaders' session, Indian PM Modi called for the BRICS business community to identify major barriers to intra-BRICS trade, support the international expansion of startups and create additional cross-border business partnerships. He also highlighted initiatives developed under India's chairship, including a BRICS Incubator Network, a BRICS MSME Portal and a BRICS Startup Innovation Fund, and stressed the importance of secure sea lanes and supply routes for global trade.

=== Bharat Innovates exposition ===
The BRICS Bharat Innovates Exposition is being held on 11–12 September alongside the Business Forum and the leaders' summit. Organised by India's Ministry of Education in coordination with the Ministry of External Affairs, it showcases 37 Indian deep-technology startups and ventures and is intended to connect startups, research institutions and laboratories with investors, corporations and other international partners.

The exposition forms part of India's education-track priority on research, innovation and startup ecosystems. BRICS leaders visited the exhibition during the first day of the summit.

=== Leaders' programme ===
The formal leaders' programme takes place over 12 and 13 September. The first day is centred on a closed plenary restricted to BRICS members, while the second-day open plenary expands participation to partner countries, invitees and representatives of international organisations.

Date	Event	Participants	Image
12 September	Arrival and official welcome of BRICS leaders	BRICS members	
12 September	Closed plenary: Inclusive Global Governance and Strengthening Multilateralism	BRICS members	
12 September	Visit to the Bharat Innovates exposition	Leaders of BRICS member countries	
12 September	Family photograph and joint tree-planting ceremony	Leaders of BRICS member countries	
12 September	Gala dinner hosted by Prime Minister Narendra Modi	Summit participants	
13 September	Arrival and official welcome of partner countries and outreach delegations	BRICS partner countries and invitees	
13 September	Family photograph and Open plenary: Resilience, Innovation, Cooperation and Sustainability: Shaping the Future for Inclusive Global Growth	BRICS members, partner countries, invitees and representatives of international organisations	

During the closed plenary on 12 September, the leaders discussed reform of global governance and multilateral institutions, economic cooperation and major international and regional developments. The session culminated in the adoption by consensus of the New Delhi Declaration.

Following the plenary, the leaders visited the Bharat Innovates exposition and participated in the official family photograph and joint tree-planting ceremony before attending a gala dinner hosted by Modi.

The open plenary on 13 September brings together BRICS members with partner countries, invitees and international organisations. Its theme, Resilience, Innovation, Cooperation and Sustainability: Shaping the Future for Inclusive Global Growth, reflects the four priorities of India's 2026 BRICS presidency.

== Agenda ==
The summit agenda includes reform of global governance and multilateral institutions, trade and investment, food and energy security, public health, disaster resilience and the resilience of critical supply chains. Leaders also discussed geopolitical conflicts, disruptions to maritime commerce and energy routes, and measures to expand economic cooperation among BRICS states.

Economic discussions included improving interoperability between payment systems, expanding the use of national and central-bank digital currencies in cross-border payments, and developing new cooperation frameworks for startups and logistics. Initiatives considered by leaders included a BRICS Incubator Network, a Startup Innovation Fund and a Logistics Supply-Chain Cooperation Framework. The summit takes place amid the continuing war involving Iran, Israel and the United States, the war in Ukraine, high energy prices and trade tensions. Differences among some BRICS members, particularly Iran and the United Arab Emirates, had been identified before the summit as a challenge to achieving consensus on geopolitical language; the members nevertheless unanimously adopted the New Delhi Declaration on 12 September.

== New Delhi Declaration ==
On 12 September, the BRICS members unanimously adopted the New Delhi Declaration: Building for Resilience, Innovation, Cooperation and Sustainability. The declaration contains 140 numbered paragraphs and reaffirms the grouping's three broad pillars of political and security cooperation, economic and financial cooperation, and cultural and people-to-people exchanges. It also records more than 400 meetings and engagements held in 30 Indian cities during India's 2026 chairship.

=== Global governance and international conflicts ===
Russian President Vladimir Putin, Indian Prime Minister Narendra Modi and Chinese President Xi Jinping at the 18th BRICS Summit in Bharat Mandapam, New Delhi, 12 September 2026

The declaration called for a more representative multilateral system and greater participation by emerging and developing countries in international institutions. It reiterated support for reform of the United Nations and other global bodies and argued that the international system should better reflect contemporary economic and political realities.

On the conflict in the Middle East, the members expressed "deep concern" over the escalation of tensions and called for "maximum restraint", protection of civilians and civilian infrastructure, respect for sovereignty and territorial integrity, and a long-term settlement through dialogue and diplomacy. The document reiterated support for humanitarian access in Gaza and for UNRWA.

The summit's handling of the Russian invasion of Ukraine also attracted attention. Unlike the 2024 Kazan and 2025 Rio de Janeiro declarations, the New Delhi Declaration did not specifically mention the war in Ukraine, despite addressing several other international conflicts and crises. The omission was noted by Indian and international commentators as a departure from previous BRICS statements.

The declaration specifically condemned the 2025 Pahalgam attack and reiterated "zero tolerance" for terrorism, including terrorist financing, safe havens and cross-border movement of terrorists.

=== Trade, finance and development ===
The members criticised the increasing use of unilateral tariff and non-tariff measures and reaffirmed support for a rules-based multilateral trading system centred on the World Trade Organization, while calling for reforms that give developing economies greater influence. The declaration also opposed unilateral coercive measures not authorised by the United Nations Security Council.

On financial cooperation, the declaration backed continued work by the BRICS Payment Task Force on interoperability between national payment and financial-messaging systems and on settlement and investment in local currencies. It did not establish a common BRICS currency. The members encouraged the New Development Bank to expand local-currency financing and continued discussion of a proposed New Investment Platform and other mechanisms for development finance.

=== Energy, climate, technology and social cooperation ===
The declaration described energy security as a foundation of development, called for stable energy markets and resilient infrastructure, and stated that fossil fuels would continue to play an important role in the energy mix of emerging and developing economies. At the same time, it reaffirmed support for a "just, orderly, equitable and inclusive" energy transition and for implementation of the Paris Agreement.

In technology policy, the members endorsed continued cooperation on artificial intelligence, digital public infrastructure, quantum technologies, research networks and start-up ecosystems. The declaration welcomed a BRICS Incubator Network and further consideration of a BRICS Startup Innovation Fund, as well as a proposed repository for digital public-infrastructure solutions. In health, it endorsed a BRICS Mission for Healthy Lifestyle and a 2026–2029 roadmap on healthy-lifestyle promotion, and supported a network of centres of excellence on mental health coordinated by India's National Institute of Mental Health and Neurosciences.

In agriculture, the declaration supported further work on the proposed BRICS Grain Exchange and cooperation on food security, agricultural inputs and climate-resilient farming.

The declaration expressed support for China's BRICS chairship in 2027 and the holding of the 19th BRICS summit in China.

== Bilateral diplomacy ==
A number of bilateral meetings took place before and during the summit. Indian PM Narendra Modi met Russian president Vladimir Putin on 11 September, with discussions covering trade, energy, defence and the wars in Ukraine and the Middle East; the two sides reiterated a goal of increasing bilateral trade to US$100 billion by 2030.

On 12 September, Indian PM Narendra Modi and Chinese leader Xi Jinping met on the summit sidelines during Xi's first visit to India in seven years. The two leaders discussed border stability, trade imbalances, market access, transport links and broader economic ties, in what was widely interpreted as a cautious attempt to stabilise China–India relations.

Iranian president Masoud Pezeshkian and UAE representative Khaled bin Mohamed Al Nahyan also held talks on 12 September, described by Reuters as the highest-level Iran–UAE meeting since the outbreak of the 2026 war. The meeting focused on regional stability and peace efforts and took place as negotiators sought consensus on the declaration's Middle East language.

== Participating delegations ==
=== BRICS members ===
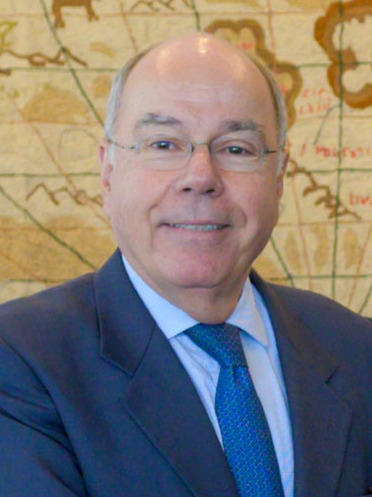
(Brazil) Brazil
Mauro Vieira, Foreign Minister

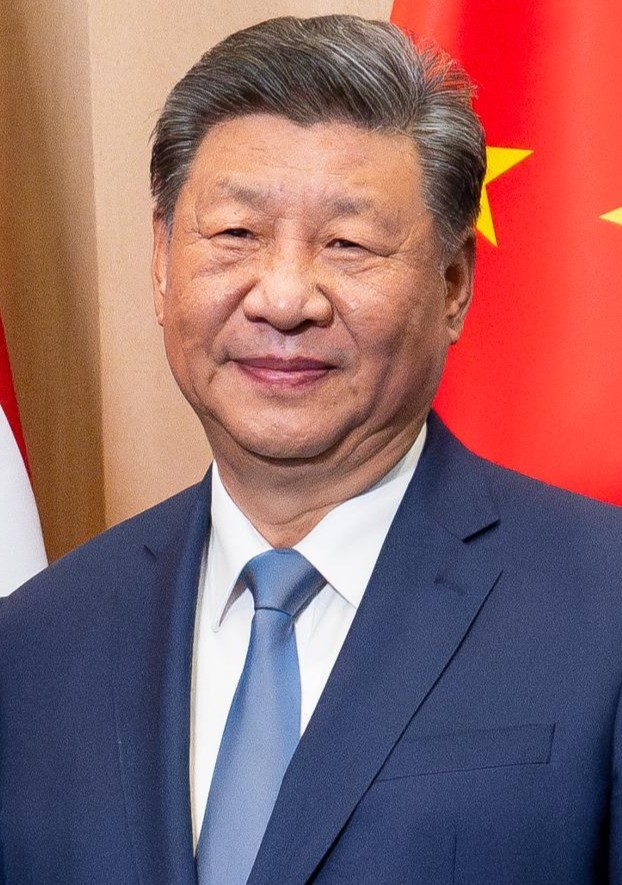
(China) China
Xi Jinping, CCP General Secretary and President (Note: Xi is also general secretary of the Chinese Communist Party and chairman of the Central Military Commission.)

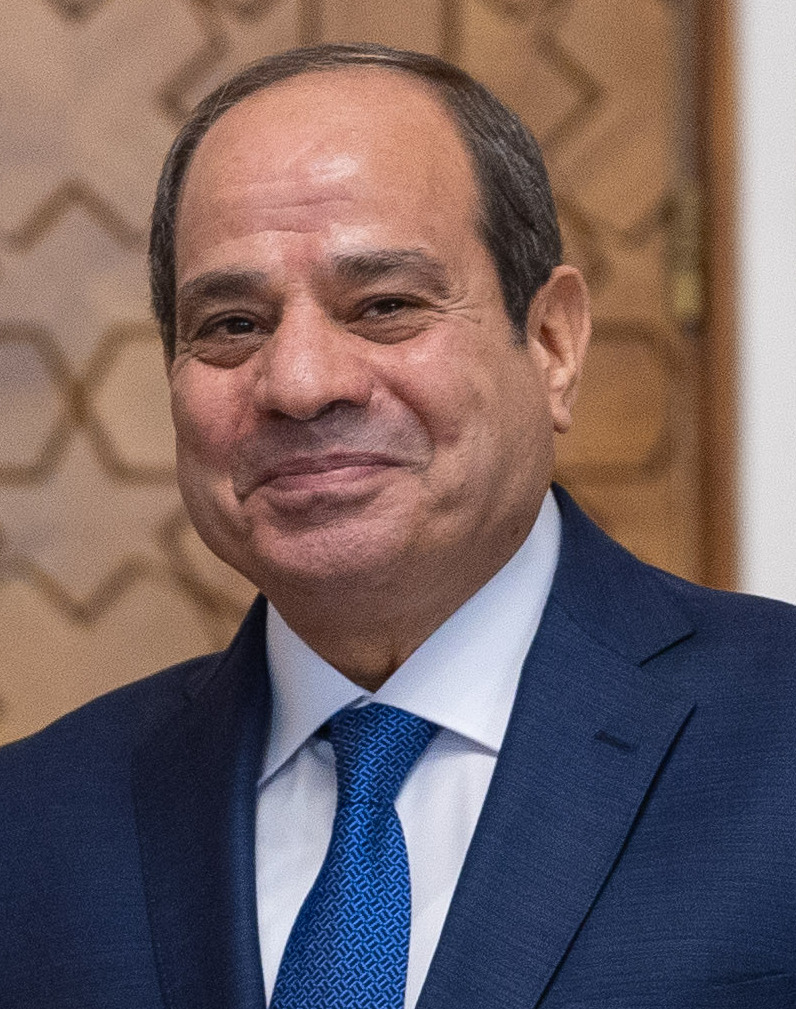
(Egypt) Egypt
Abdel Fattah el-Sisi, President

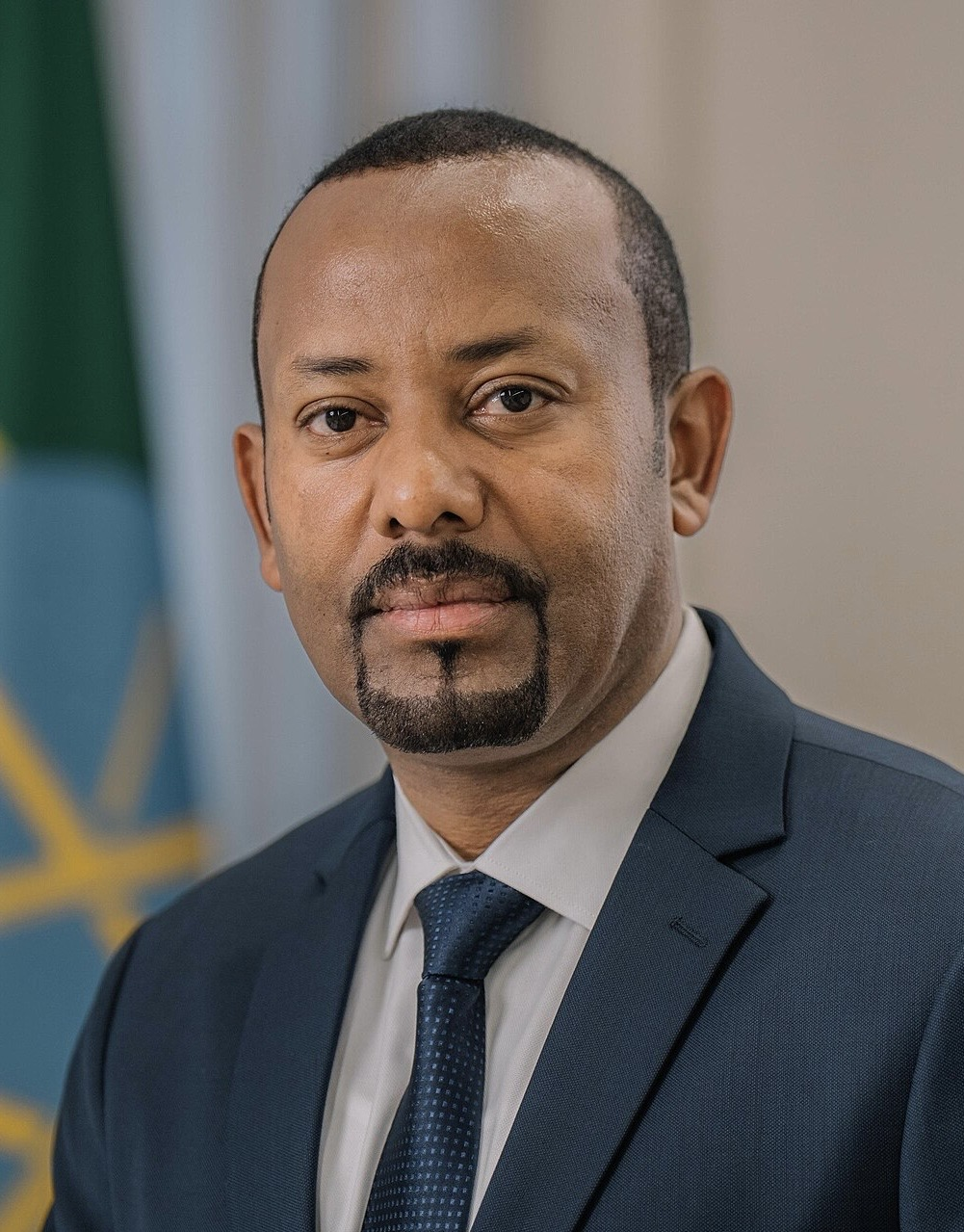
(Ethiopia) Ethiopia
Abiy Ahmed, Prime Minister

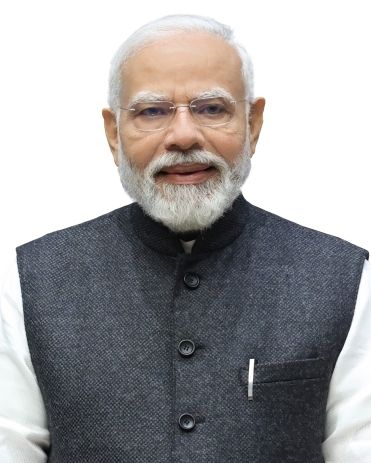
(India) India
Narendra Modi, Prime Minister (Host)

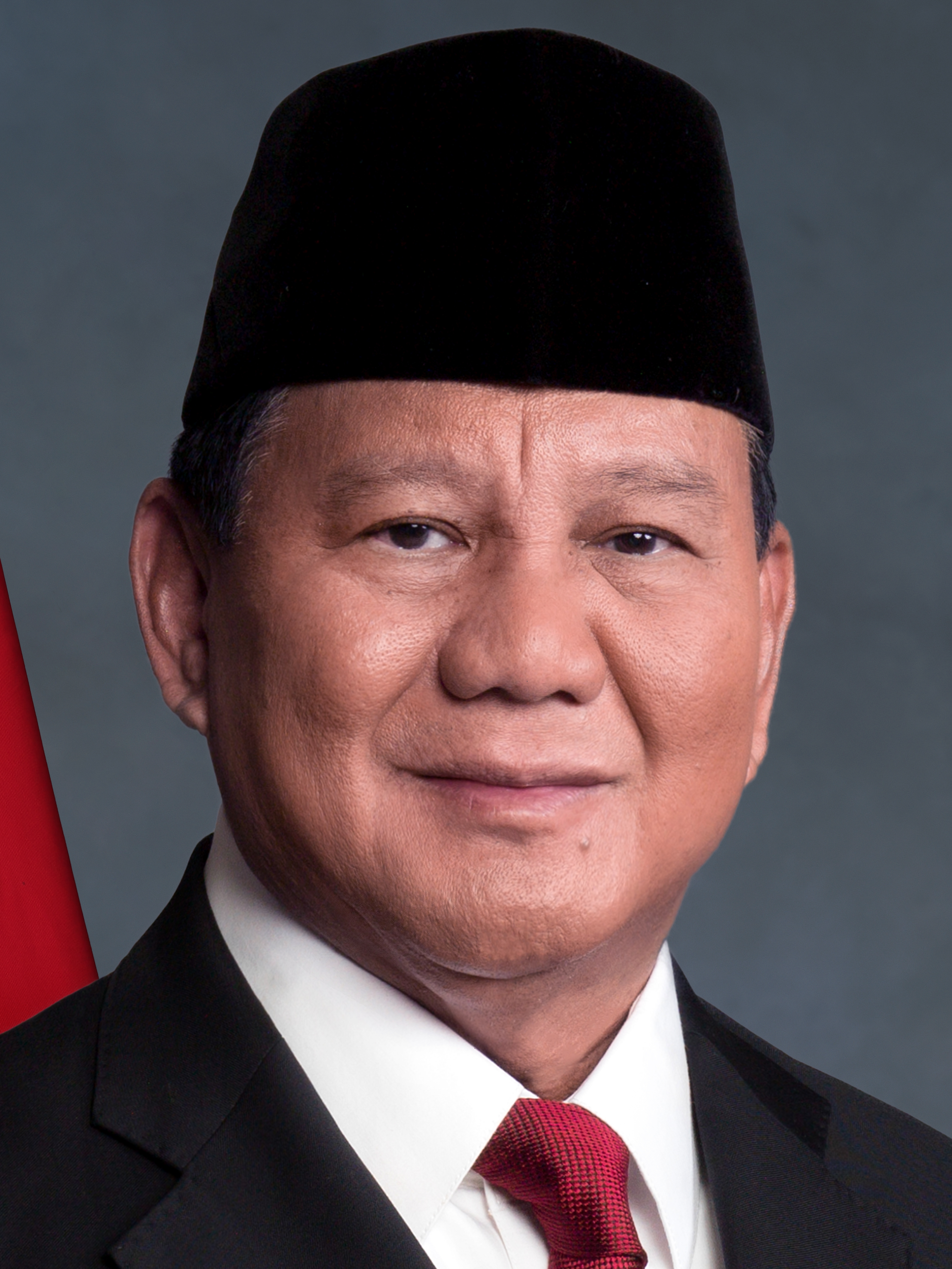
(Indonesia) Indonesia
Prabowo Subianto, President

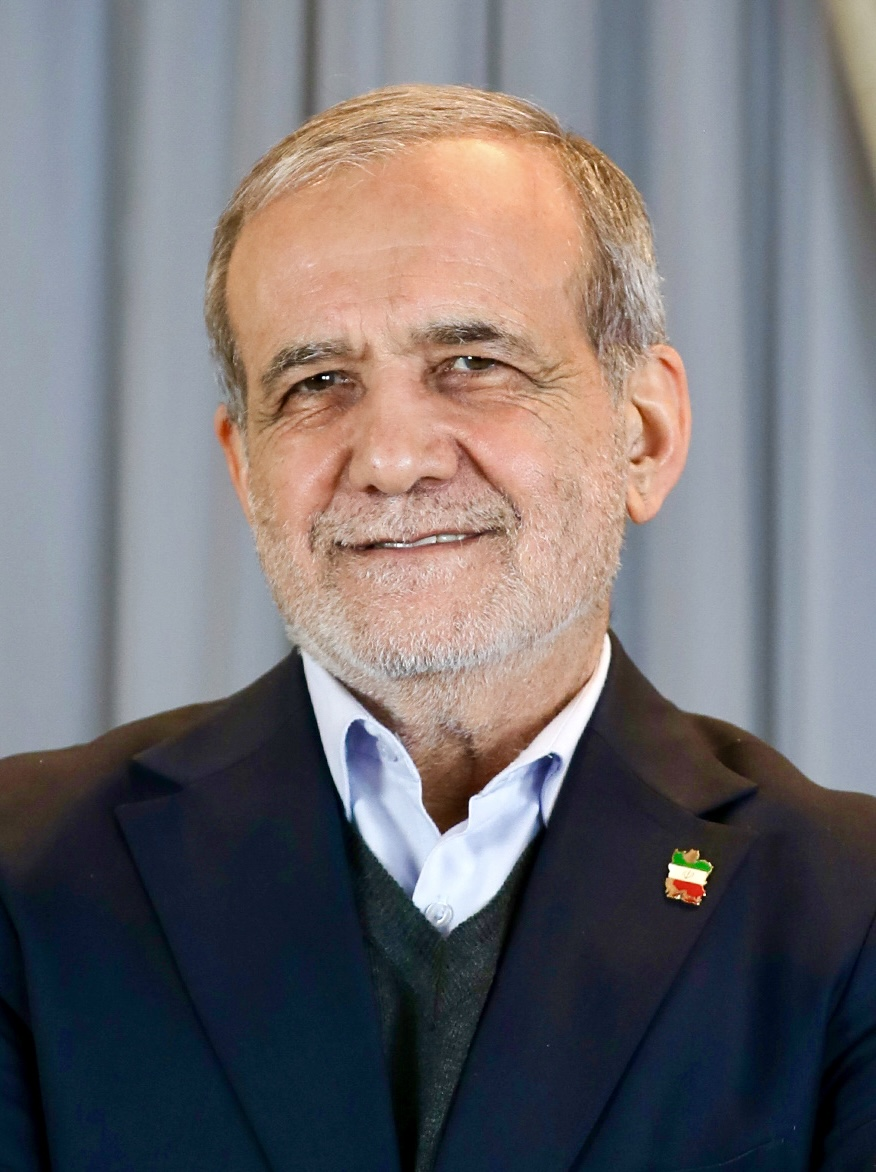
(Iran) Iran
Masoud Pezeshkian, President

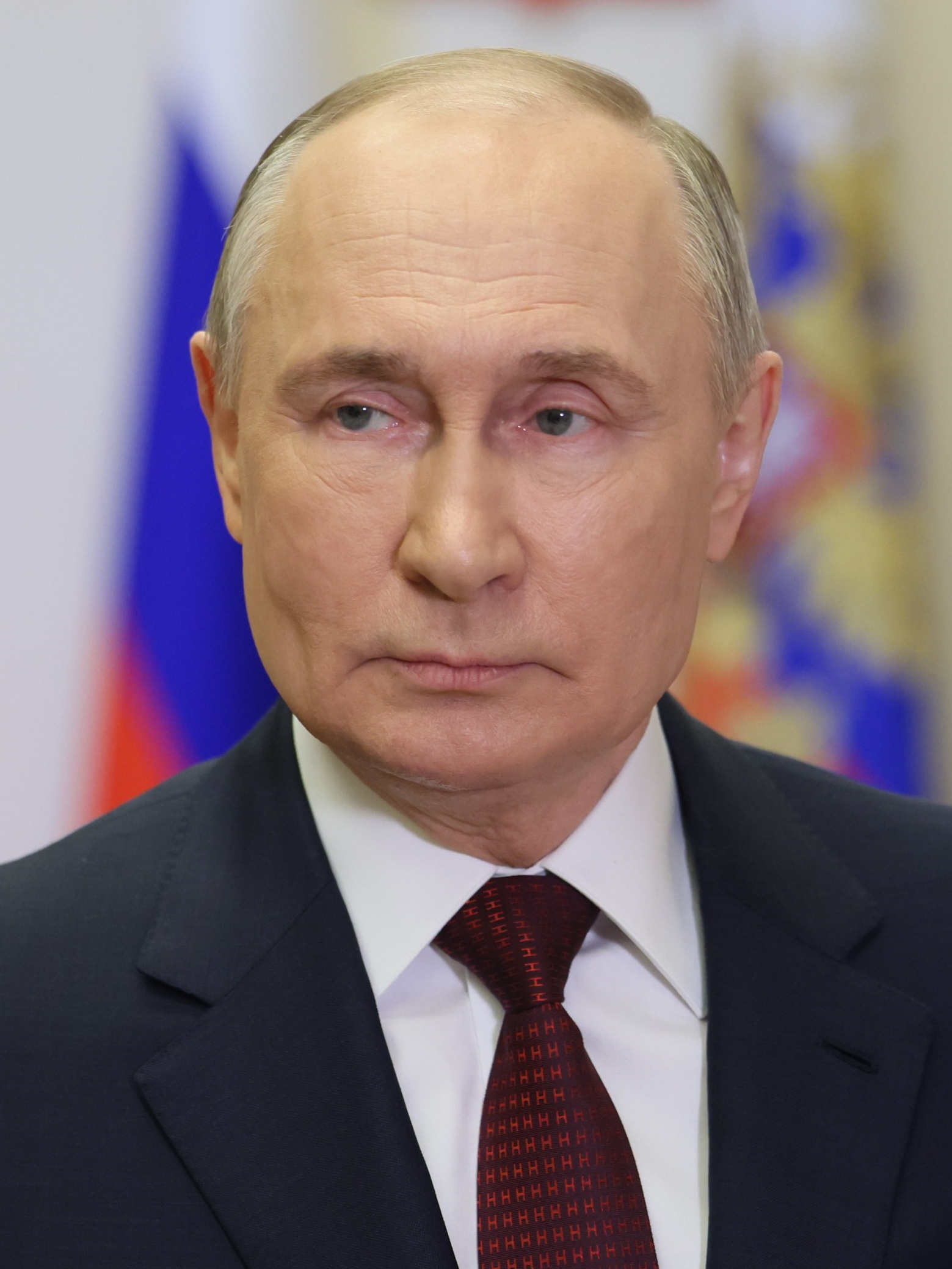
(Russia) Russia
Vladimir Putin, President

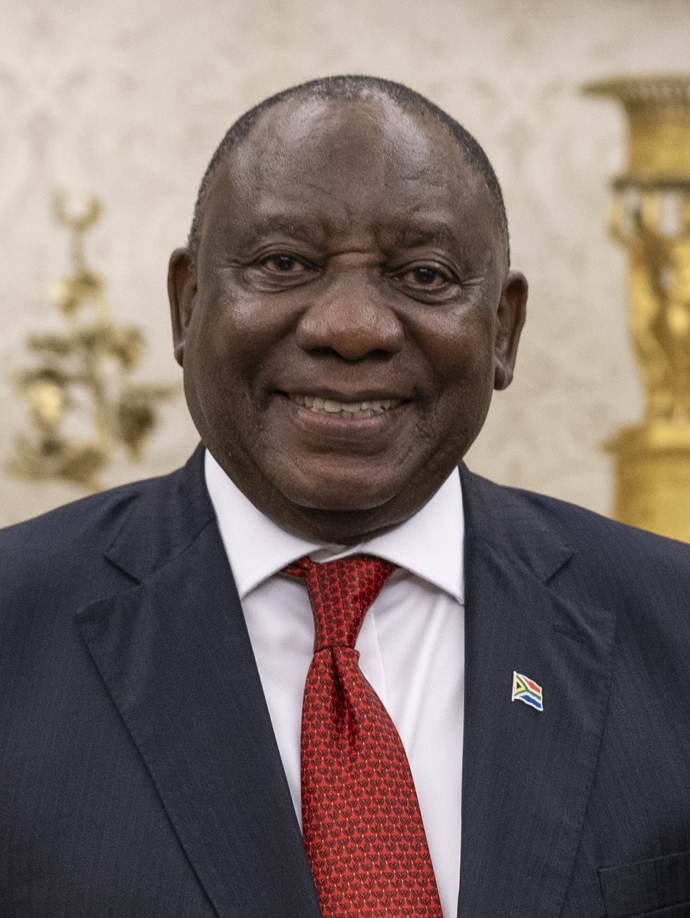
(South Africa) South Africa
Cyril Ramaphosa, President

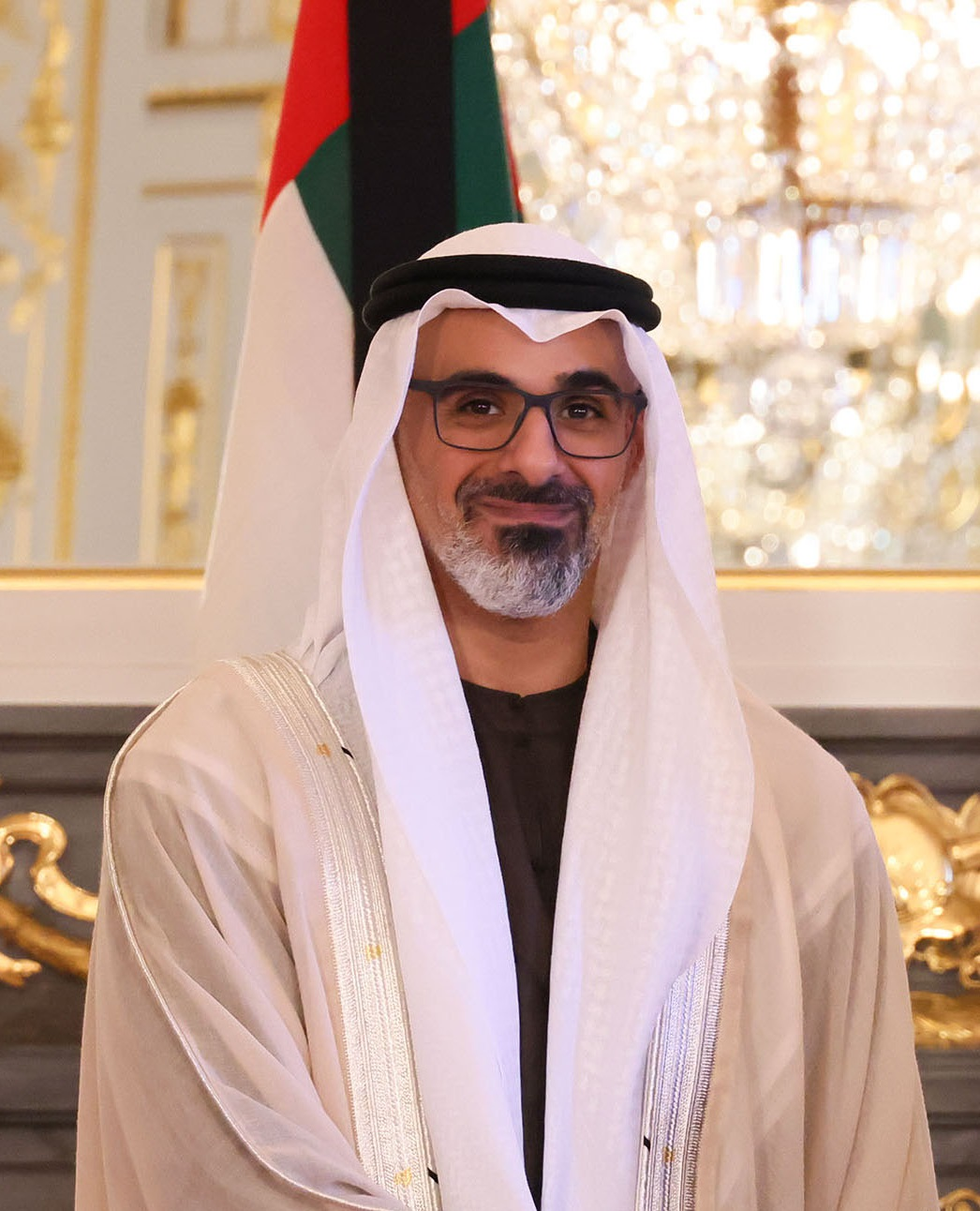
(United Arab Emirates) United Arab Emirates
Khaled bin Mohamed Al Nahyan, President (Note: Khaled is also Crown Prince of Abu Dhabi and chairman of the Abu Dhabi Executive Council.)

Saudi Arabia is listed as a BRICS member by official BRICS and Indian government sources, although Riyadh has not publicly confirmed formal accession and its status has continued to be described as ambiguous in independent reporting. In the New Delhi Summit, while the Saudi delegation was represented, Saudi Arabia didn't participate as a full member.

=== BRICS partner countries ===
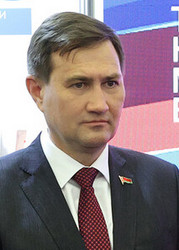
(Belarus) Belarus
Maxim Ryzhenkov, Foreign Minister

(Bolivia) Bolivia
Arlette Gabriela Bustamante García, chargé d'affaires of the Bolivian embassy in India

(Cuba) Cuba
Bruno Rodríguez Parrilla, Foreign Minister

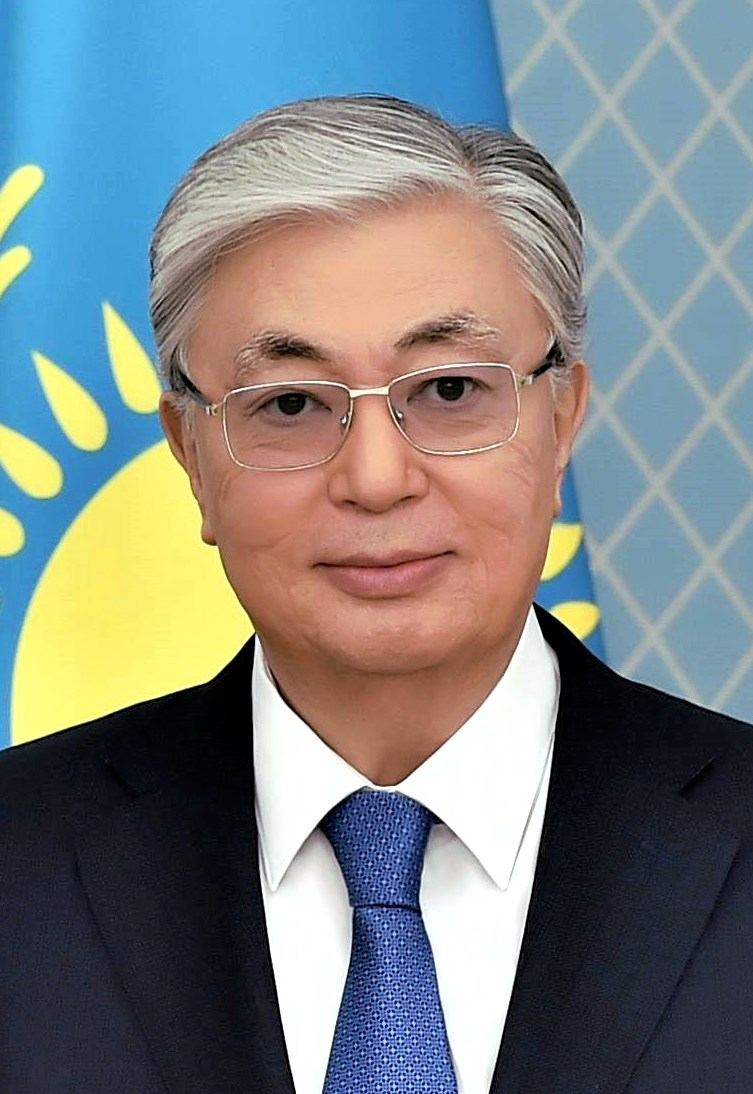
(Kazakhstan) Kazakhstan
Kassym-Jomart Tokayev, President
also representing the Eurasian Economic Union

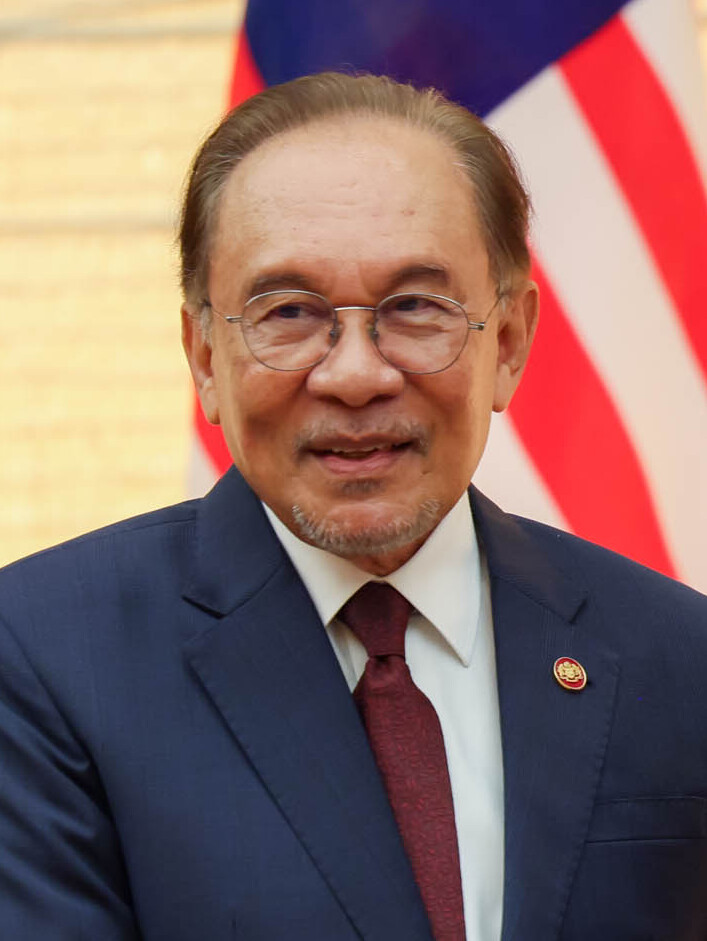
(Malaysia) Malaysia
Anwar Ibrahim, Prime Minister

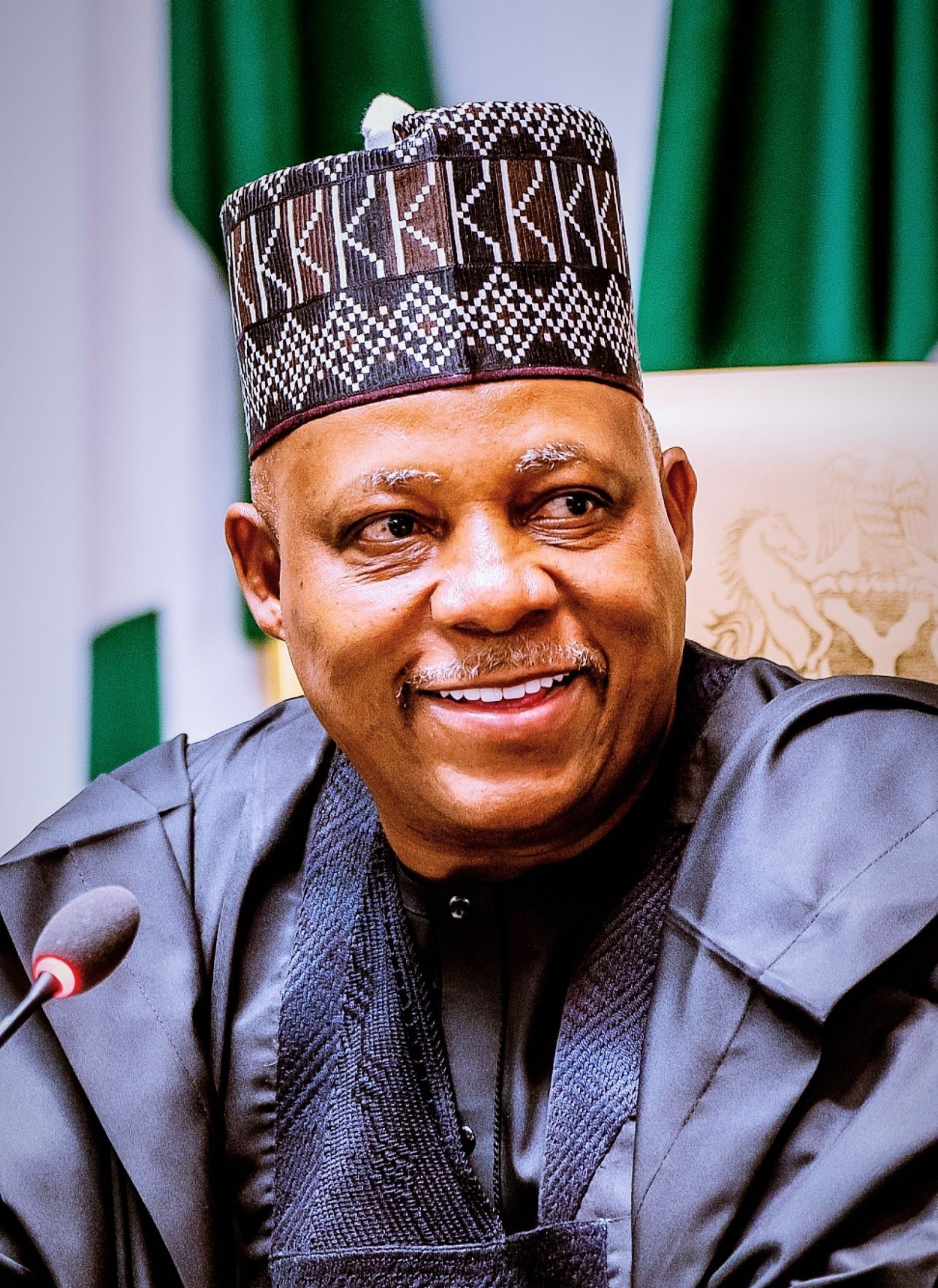
(Nigeria) Nigeria
Kashim Shettima, Vice President

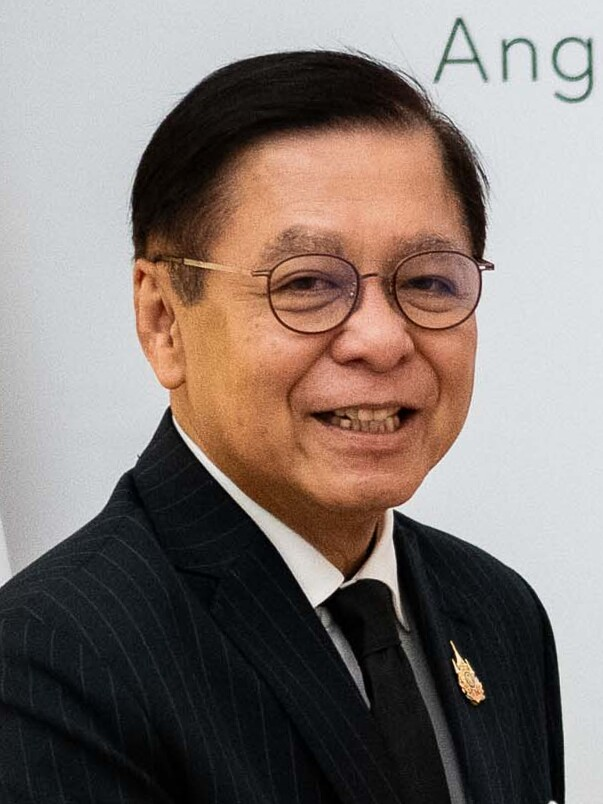
(Thailand) Thailand
Sihasak Phuangketkeow, Deputy Prime Minister and Foreign Minister

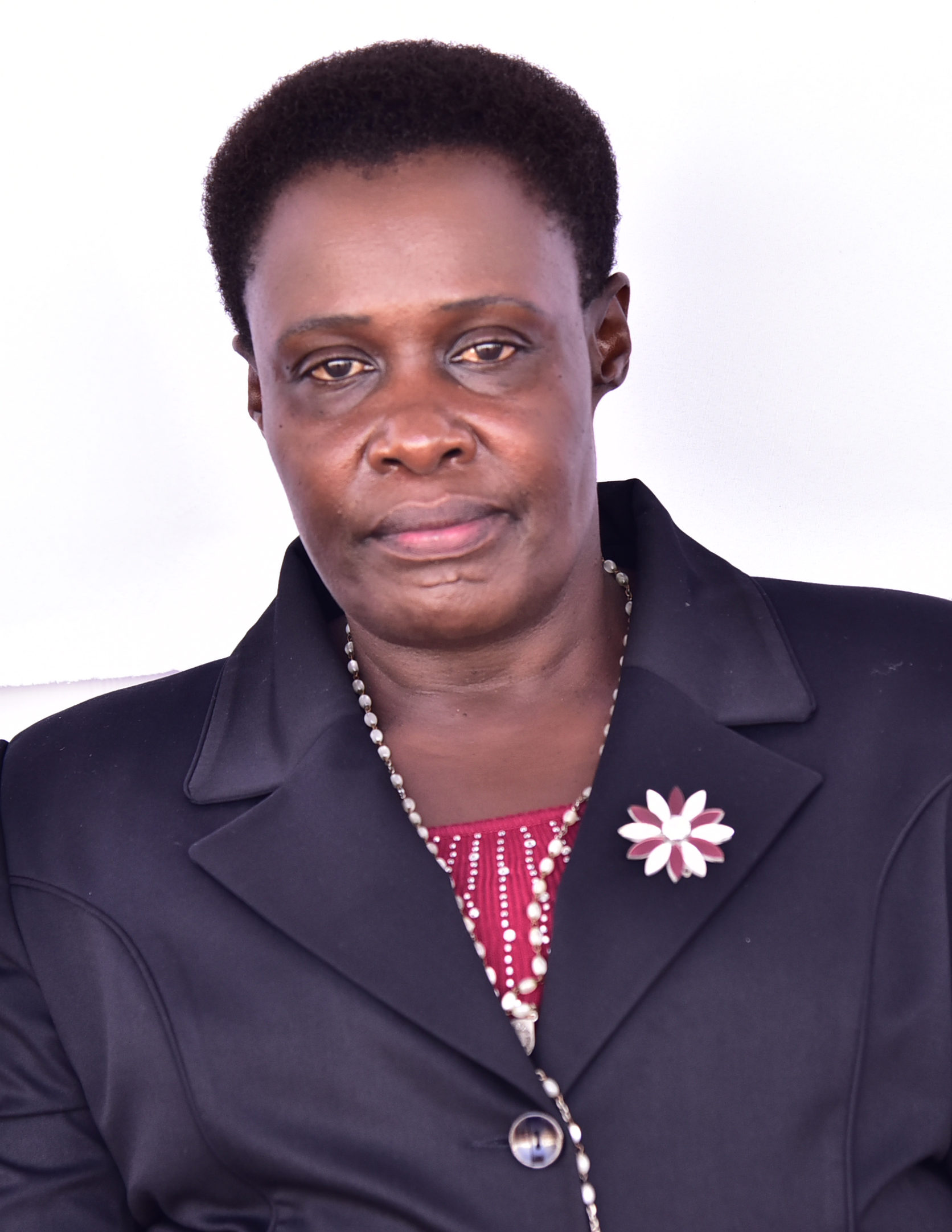
(Uganda) Uganda
Jessica Alupo, Vice President

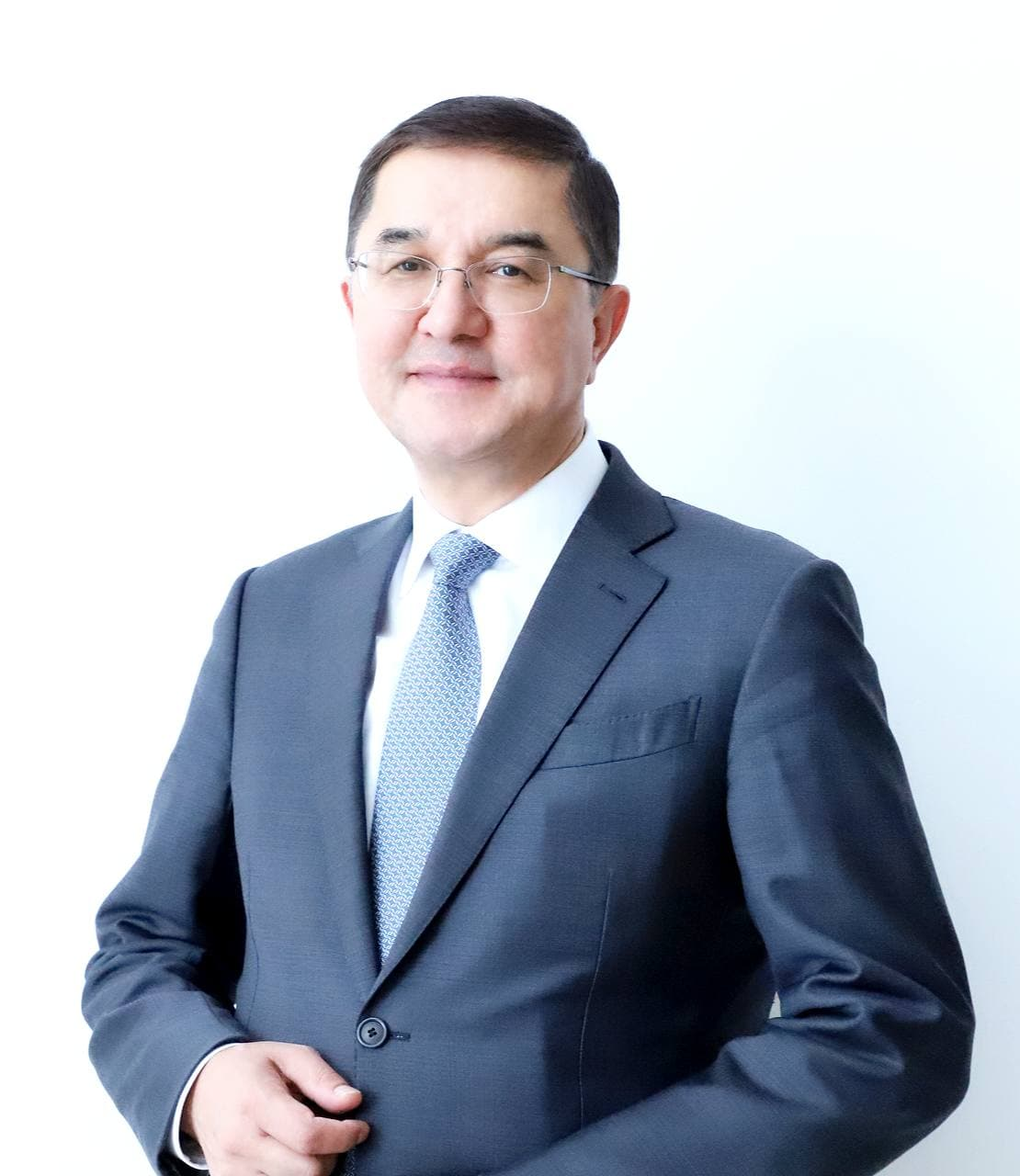
(Uzbekistan) Uzbekistan
Jamshid Kuchkarov, Deputy Prime Minister and Minister of Economy and Finance

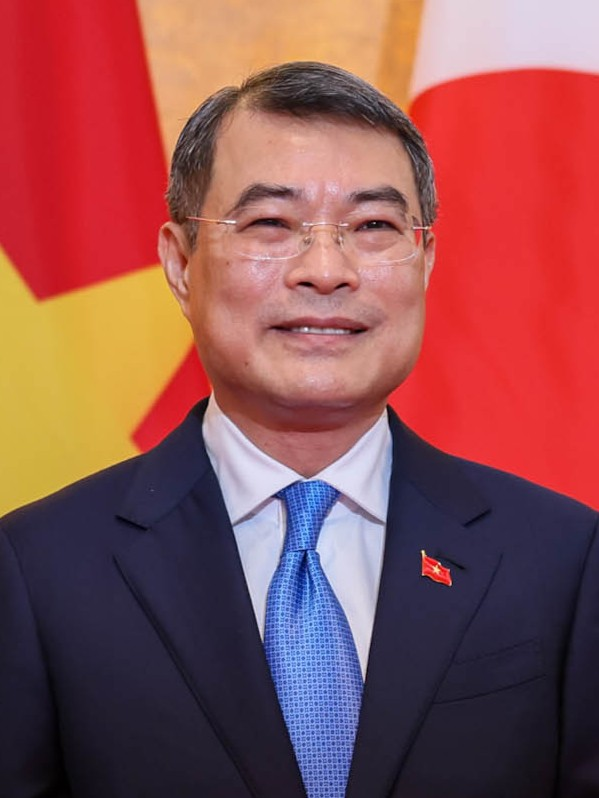
(Vietnam) Vietnam
Lê Minh Hưng, Prime Minister

=== Invitees ===
(Bahrain) Bahrain
Abdullatif bin Rashid Al Zayani, Foreign Minister
representing the Gulf Cooperation Council

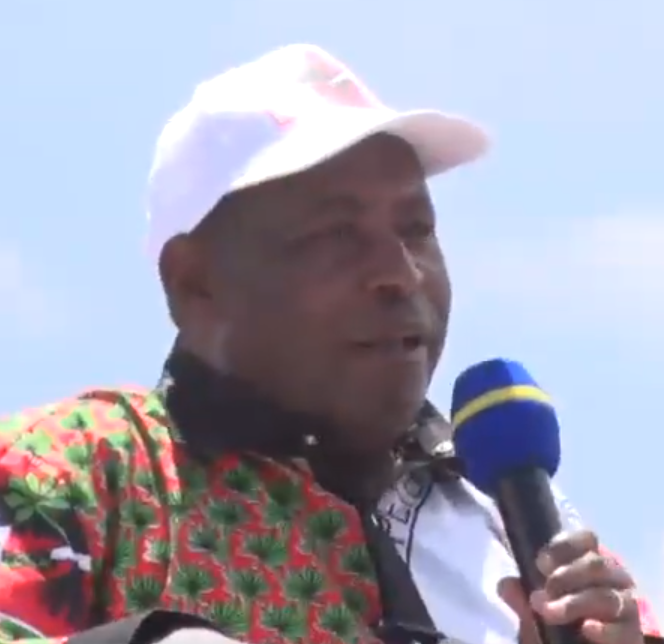
(Burundi) Burundi
Évariste Ndayishimiye, President
representing the African Union

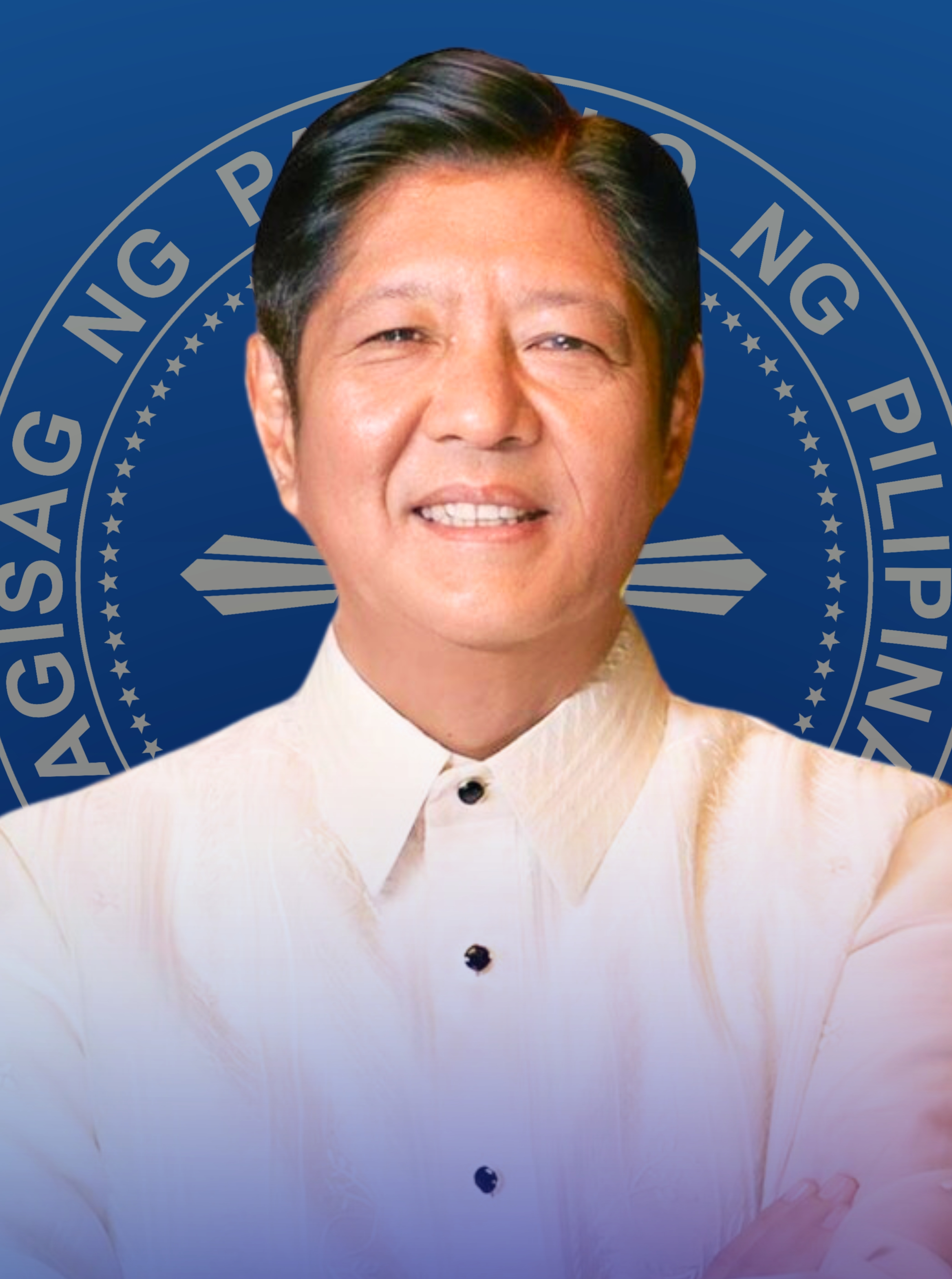
(Philippines) Philippines
Bongbong Marcos, President
representing ASEAN

(Saudi Arabia) Saudi Arabia
Faisal bin Farhan Al Saud, Foreign Minister (Note: Saudi Arabia's status within BRICS remains ambiguous. The Government of India and official BRICS-related material issued during India's 2026 chairship list Saudi Arabia among the grouping's eleven members. However, Saudi Arabia has not consistently or publicly confirmed that it completed formal accession after receiving an invitation to join BRICS in 2023, and independent reporting, including Reuters, has continued to describe the kingdom as having not formally joined. At the 2026 New Delhi summit, Saudi Arabia was represented by Foreign Minister Faisal bin Farhan Al Saud, but he participated in the summit with the status of invitee.)

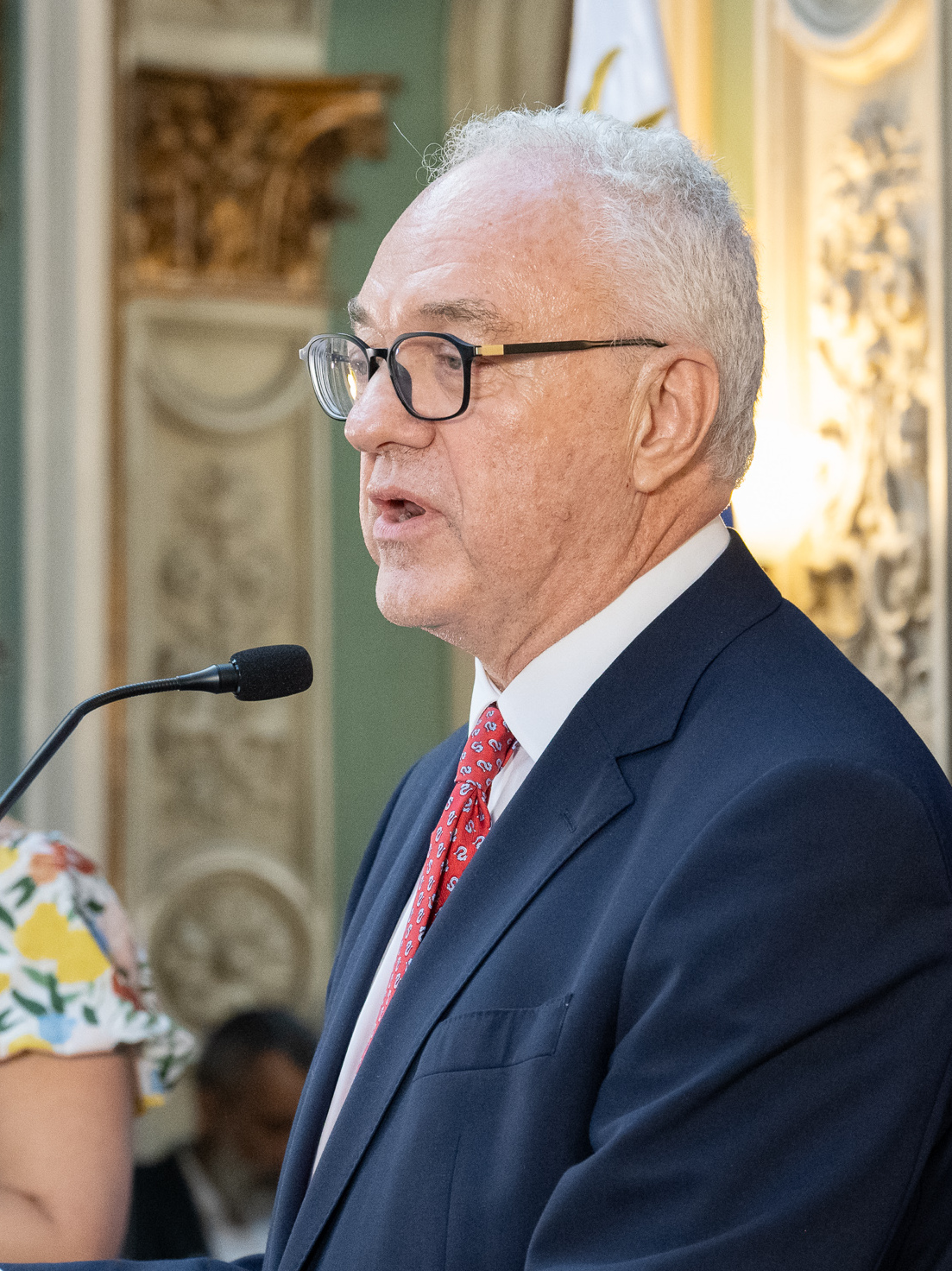
(Uruguay) Uruguay
Mario Lubetkin, Foreign Minister
representing the CELAC

India invited the chairs of several regional organisations to the summit's outreach session. Kazakhstan's President Tokayev participates both as the leader of a BRICS partner country and as a representative of the Eurasian Economic Union. Bangladesh's Prime Minister Tarique Rahman had been invited in his capacity as chair of BIMSTEC, but Bangladesh announced on 10 September that it would not send a government representative to the summit.

=== International organisations ===
Several international organisations are represented at the summit.

United Nations
António Guterres, Secretary-General

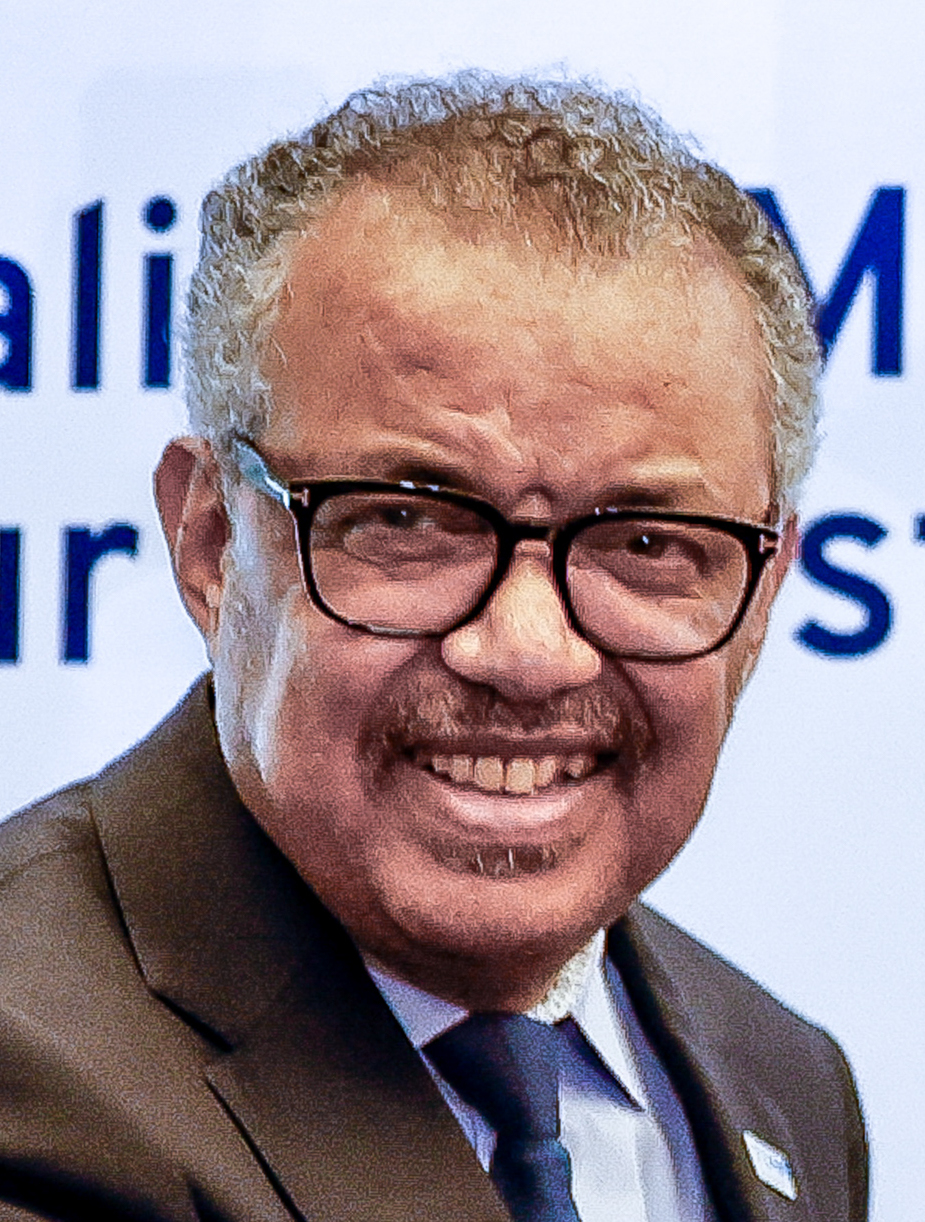
World Health Organization
Tedros Adhanom Ghebreyesus, Director-General

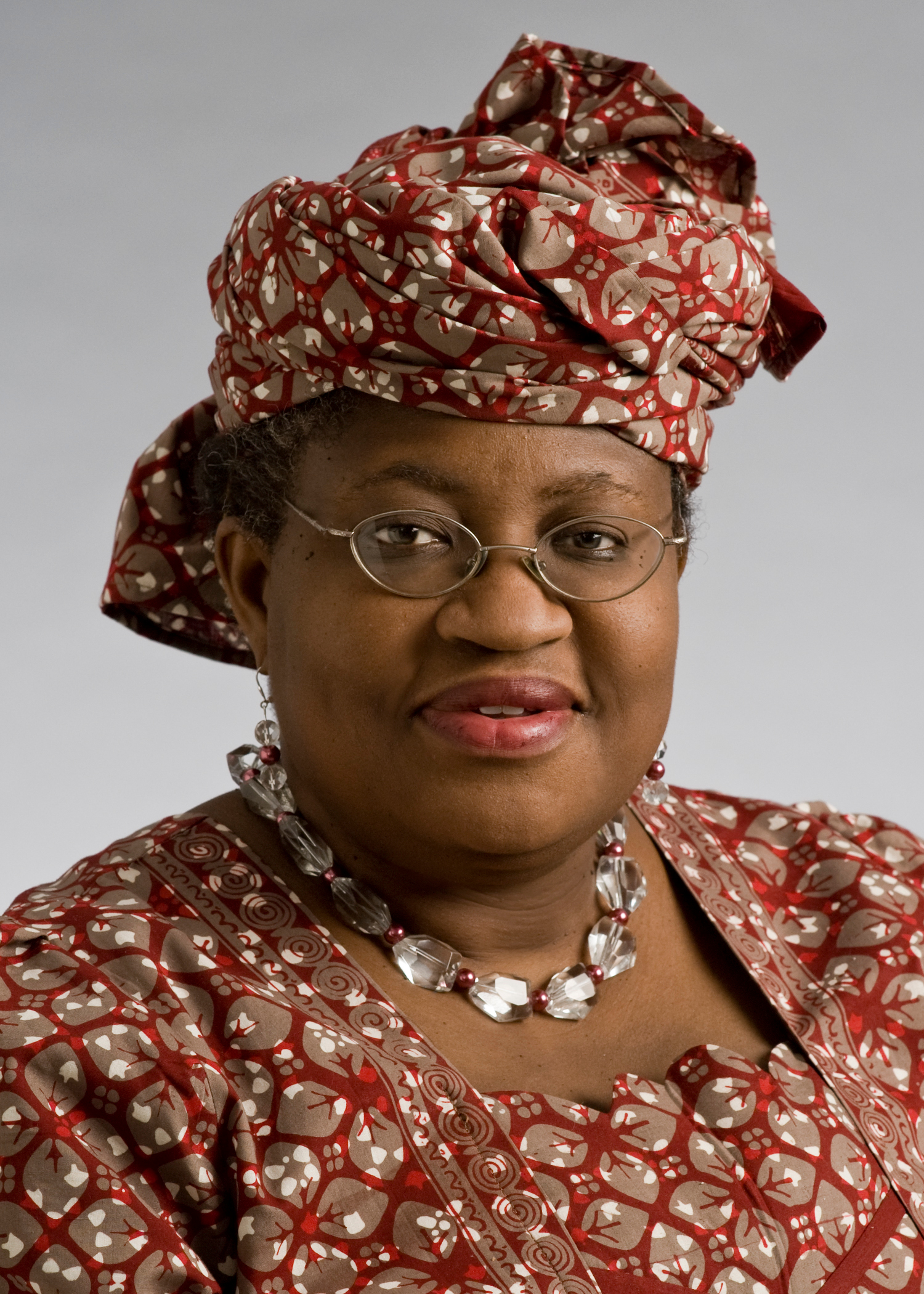
World Trade Organization
Ngozi Okonjo-Iweala, Director-General

New Development Bank
Dilma Rousseff, President

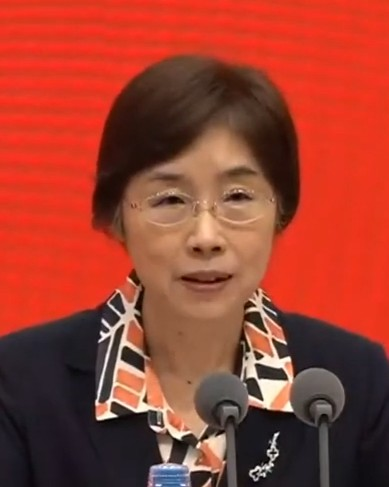
Asian Infrastructure Investment Bank
Zou Jiayi, President and Chair of the Board of Directors

The International Solar Alliance is represented by its Director-General, Ashish Khanna, while the Coalition for Disaster Resilient Infrastructure is represented by its Director-General, Amit Prothi.

== Reception and analysis ==
International coverage focused on the significance of reaching a consensus declaration despite divisions within the expanded grouping. Reuters noted that agreement had been expected to be a "particularly challenging task for host New Delhi", because BRICS includes both Iran and the United Arab Emirates, whose positions had sharply diverged during the 2026 Middle East conflict. The agreement contrasted with the BRICS foreign ministers' meeting in New Delhi in May, which ended without a joint communiqué because of differences over the war, leaving India to issue a chair's statement instead.

Associated Press interpreted the summit as demonstrating both BRICS' continuing opposition to what many members regard as Western dominance of international institutions and India's effort to balance that agenda with its relations with Western countries, Russia, Iran and the Gulf states. The Financial Times highlighted a "push for Gulf peace" but noted that India–China strategic competition continued to limit cohesion and that proposals for a sharper move away from the US dollar were avoided.

Iranian President Masoud Pezeshkian, Indian Prime Minister Narendra Modi, Russian President Vladimir Putin and South African President Cyril Ramaphosa at the BRICS Business Forum

BBC noted that while China, Russia and Iran aim to use BRICS as a vehicle to counter the influence of the US and western Europe, India does not seek to cast the group as an anti-Western bloc, with Modi himself saying that the group is "not against anyone". In an analysis for The Indian Express, C. Raja Mohan characterised India's approach under the headline "No fire & brimstone", arguing that New Delhi had resisted attempts to turn BRICS into a confrontational geopolitical bloc and instead emphasised practical cooperation on supply chains, health, digital infrastructure, development finance and other areas. The Guardian similarly contrasted Beijing's view of BRICS as a counterweight to the United States with India's preference for a bridging role between the West and developing countries, while highlighting Xi's visit as part of a tentative thaw in India–China relations.

Bloomberg News noted that deep divide between China and India still remains, with New Delhi highlighting economic imbalances that have made the country more dependent on China in recent years, as the trade deficit has doubled in the last decade.

Bloomberg News described the summit as one in which several governments at odds with the United States "found common ground", noting that the declaration criticised unilateral war, tariffs and sanctions without naming the United States directly. BBC also noted that the New Delhi declaration "assigns no blame" on anyone for ongoing 2026 Iran war. An opinion piece of Al-Jazeera also noted the summit lacked mention of the United States despite BRICS members having been significantly affected by the Iran war, and added the wording "revealed just how difficult it is for BRICS to turn shared dissatisfaction with the Western-led order into coordinated geopolitical action".

The summit's approach to the Russo-Ukrainian War was also noted by analysts. The New Delhi Declaration did not specifically mention the war, in contrast to several earlier BRICS declarations. Political scientist Kristen Hopewell has argued that BRICS members' refusal to condemn Russia or join Western sanctions has helped undermine efforts to isolate Russia and has contributed to the consolidation of the grouping during the war.

== Security and logistics ==
Indian authorities mounted a large security operation across New Delhi for the summit, with approximately 30,000 personnel from the Delhi Police and other agencies deployed around the venue, airports, delegation hotels and major routes. Security arrangements included layered cordons, anti-drone systems, surveillance cameras and traffic restrictions around central Delhi.

Delegations were accommodated across multiple hotels in New Delhi. Road diversions and temporary restrictions were introduced around Bharat Mandapam, diplomatic areas, airports and hotels during high-level movements, while authorities encouraged residents to use the Delhi Metro where possible.

== Controversies ==
Schools across Delhi were closed on 11 September 2026 to pave the way for the foreign officials. Offices and the Supreme Court were also ordered to remain closed for the day. A former Indian intelligence official noted that the shut down was, "causing great discomfort to the common people".

Ahead of the summit, the opposition Aam Aadmi Party criticised the central government after curtains and screens were placed along routes near some slums and low-income settlements in Delhi, accusing authorities of attempting to conceal poverty rather than address it. Residents of the Coolie Camp settlement in Vasant Vihar, where screening had also been used during the 2023 G20 summit, told Brut that they felt they were being hidden from visiting delegations.

India's leading opposition Indian National Congress criticised the dinner menu of the summit for being entirely vegetarian. This controversy arose after Xi Jinping and Crown Prince of Abu Dhabi Khaled bin Mohamed had skipped the dinner.

South African President Cyril Ramaphosa stepped back from public duties due ill health after the summit. Some unverified reports claimed Xi Jinping was also ill after visiting the summit. Footage of an exchange in which Prime Minister Narendra Modi asked Chinese President Xi Jinping "Is it okay?" prompted speculation about Xi's health. Subsequent footage filmed by Russian state broadcaster Rossiya 1 from a different angle appeared to show Xi handling or adjusting his translation earpiece immediately beforehand, providing a possible explanation for the exchange.
