= Abdulla Bin Mohamed Bin Butti Al Hamed =

Emirati politician and sheikh

Abdulla bin Mohamed bin Butti Al Hamed
- عبدالله بن محمد بن بطي آل حامد
- Born: 23 February 1973 (age 53); Abu Dhabi, United Arab Emirates
- Title: Sheikh

Abdulla bin Mohamed bin Butti Al Hamed (Arabic: عبدالله بن محمد بن بطي آل حامد; born 23 February 1973) is an Emirati politician and sheikh who has been the head of the National Media Office with the rank of minister since January 2024. He was previously the chair of the Department of Health in the Emirate of Abu Dhabi and a member of the Abu Dhabi Executive Council.

== Education ==
Al Hamed has a Bachelor of Science degree in Business Administration from Marylhurst College. He obtained a Master's degree in Business Administration from New York Institute of Technology, Abu Dhabi campus.

== Career ==
Al Hamed began his career as a government employee at the Abu Dhabi Investment Authority (1997–2000). He worked in the Ministry of Foreign Affairs as Managing Director of the European Affairs Department (2011–2012), and then as an undersecretary (2012–2014).

Al Hamed was the chairman of the Abu Dhabi Water and Electricity Authority from 2015 to 2016.

In 2016, Al Hamed was appointed to the Abu Dhabi Executive Council.

Between 2016 and 2017, he was Chairman of Energy Authority in Abu Dhabi, and Chairman of Regulation and Supervision Bureau and a member of the Abu Dhabi Supreme Petroleum Council.

Al Hamed has also been the chairman of the Department of Health in the Emirate of Abu Dhabi.
