= Government of Abu Dhabi =

Government of the Emirate of Abu Dhabi

Government of Abu Dhabi حكومة أبوظبي
- Emirate: Emirate of Abu Dhabi
- Country: United Arab Emirates
- Website: abudhabi.gov.ae

Head of Government
- Ruler of Abu Dhabi: Mohamed bin Zayed Al Nahyan

Executive Authority
- Chairman: Khaled bin Mohammed Al Nahyan
- Main body: Abu Dhabi Executive Council
- Appointed by: Ruler of Abu Dhabi

Judicial Authority
- Court: Abu Dhabi Court of Cassation

The Government of Abu Dhabi (Arabic: حكومة أبوظبي) is the subnational authority that governs the Emirate of Abu Dhabi, one of the seven constituent monarchies which make up the United Arab Emirates. The executive authority and head of the government is the ruler of Abu Dhabi, Sheikh Mohamed bin Zayed Al Nahyan. The ruler of Abu Dhabi appoints the Abu Dhabi Executive Council (ADEC), which is tasked with overseeing and managing the Abu Dhabi governmental departments and agencies.

== History ==
The Emirate of Abu Dhabi had an informal government directly ruled by the ruler of Abu Dhabi since the Bani Yas confederation settled the emirate in 1761. The Emirate would remain informally ruled following the signing of the first agreement with the British Empire in 1892. The ruler of Abu Dhabi would appoint representatives for Al Ain and other western regions, a position held by Sheikh Zayed bin Sultan Al Nahyan in 1946 prior to becoming the ruler of Abu Dhabi in 1966 and establishing the first agency of what would be later reformed into the Abu Dhabi government, the Abu Dhabi Planning Council.

== Organisation ==
The ruler of Abu Dhabi is the absolute monarch of the Emirate of Abu Dhabi and has the sole authority to issue decrees establishing governmental departments, issuing and amending laws and is the head of government.

Abu Dhabi governmental departments or agencies are formed by royal decree by the emir, or the Abu Dhabi Executive Council, and enforced and overseen by the ADEC. ADEC is responsible for all regions of the emirate which have their own entities such as Al Ain Municipality. As of August 2022, there were 33 agencies, departments, and entities of the Abu Dhabi government.

=== Departments and agencies ===
- Abu Dhabi Agriculture and Food Safety Authority
- Abu Dhabi Judicial Department
- Abu Dhabi Housing Authority
- Abu Dhabi Police
- Abu Dhabi Quality and Conformity Council
- Department of Community Development
- Department of Culture and Tourism
- Department of Economic Development
- Department of Education and Knowledge
- Department of Energy
- Department of Finance
- Department of Health
- Department of Municipalities and Transport
- Environment Agency - Abu Dhabi
- General Administration of Customs - Abu Dhabi
- Human Resources Authority

== Jurisdiction ==
The UAE Constitution allows each emirate to maintain its own local government, separate from the federal government of the UAE, and the authority to interpret federal law and issue local regulations to enforce them. Similar to the Government of Dubai, the Abu Dhabi government maintain vast autonomy from the federal government, with jurisdiction over security, education, economic policy, energy management and is only one of three emirates with its own separate judicial system and independent Court of Cassation.

== Abu Dhabi Executive Council ==
The Abu Dhabi Executive Council is the main executive governing organ of the emirate of Abu Dhabi, being responsible for enforcing local laws and interpreting and enforcing UAE federal law. The ADEC is responsible for overseeing the work and day-to-day management of Abu Dhabi governmental departments alongside issuing resolutions to appoint governmental heads and resolutions for actual application of laws. All governmental departments report to the ADEC, and membership of the ADEC primarily includes the heads of local governmental departments. Since 2004, the chairman of the ADEC has been Sheikh Mohamed bin Zayed Al Nahyan who was appointed as crown prince of Abu Dhabi and continues to serve as chairman following his assumption of the position of ruler of Abu Dhabi and president of the UAE in May 2022.

=== Abu Dhabi Executive Office ===
Concerning Abu Dhabi Executive Office (Law 18 of 2019) (in Arabic). 25 April 2019. established the Abu Dhabi Executive Office (ADEO) as an independent entity, replacing the Secretariat of the ADEC with a task of supporting the ADEC in administrative duties, legal opinions, researching proposals provided by governmental departments, contracting third-party consultants, and publishing the official gazette. The chairman of the Executive Office also assumes a seat at the ADEC. Since 2019, the ADEO has been led by Sheikh Khaled bin Mohamed Al Nahyan.

== See also ==
- House of Nahyan
- Politics of the United Arab Emirates
