= DGCX =

DGCX may refer to:

- railroad symbol for Dakota Gasification Company, a synthetic natural gas producing company in Beulah, North Dakota, United States
- Dubai Gold & Commodities Exchange, a financial exchange in Dubai, United Arab Emirates
