= Sara Musallam =

Emirati businesswoman and politician

Sara Awad Issa Musallam is a businesswoman and politician from the United Arab Emirates. On 22 May 2022, she joined the Cabinet of the United Arab Emirates as Minister of State for Early Education, where she oversees the newly established Federal Authority for Early Education.

== Education ==
Musallam graduated from the American University of Sharjah and the Higher Colleges of Technology in Abu Dhabi.

== Roles ==
Musallam has held the following roles:

- Member of Abu Dhabi Executive Council
- Member of Life Quality and Wellbeing Committee of Abu Dhabi Executive Committee
- Board member of Al Yah Satellite Communication Company (YahSat)
- Member of UAE Cabinet's Education and Human Resources Council
- Member of the Board of Trustees of Khalifa Award for Education
- Member of the Board of Trustees of Abu Dhabi Early Childhood Authority
- Member of Abu Dhabi's Advanced Technology Research Council
- Member of the UAE's National Emergency, Crisis and Disasters Management Authority
- Member of the Board of Trustees of Mohamed bin Zayed University for Humanities
- Member of the Board of Trustees of MODON
