= Salama bint Hamdan Al Nahyan =

Emirati royal

- Born: Salama bint Hamdan bin Mohammed Al Nahyan; 1956 (age 69–70)
- Spouse: Mohamed bin Zayed Al Nahyan (m. 1981)
- Issue more...: Sheikh Khaled
- House: House of Al Nahyan
- Father: Hamdan bin Mohammed Al Nahyan
- Mother: Maryam bint Abdullah bin Sulayem Al Falasi

Salama bint Hamdan Al Nahyan is an Emirati royal. She is known for her philanthropic activities and arts patronage. She is the wife of Mohamed bin Zayed Al Nahyan, president of the United Arab Emirates and ruler of Abu Dhabi.

== Biography ==
Salama bint Hamdan is a member of the ruling family of Abu Dhabi, House of Nahyan. Her father, Sheikh Hamdan bin Mohammed Al Nahyan, was a former UAE deputy prime minister. Her mother was Maryam bint Abdullah bin Sulayem Al Falasi, who died on 9 February 2023.

She is the founder and president of a philanthropic foundation with her name, Salama bint Hamdan Al Nahyan Foundation, based in Abu Dhabi. She is also the chair of the Abu Dhabi Art Host Committee. She is the owner of various significant paintings which were produced by Pablo Picasso and Rudolf Ernst, and also, modern Egyptian painting, in addition to Islamic ceramics. In 2010, she bought a work by Damien Hirst from the White Cube gallery for $4 million.

Her other public roles include chair of the General Women's Union, president of the Supreme Council for Motherhood and Childhood, and supreme chair of the Family Development Foundation. She is the recipient of the woman personality of the year award in 2011 by the Middle East Excellence Awards Institute and the Sharjah voluntary work award in 2012. She was among the Canvass magazine's Power 50 in relation to her activities in Middle Eastern art and culture.

== Marriage and children ==
In 1981, Salama bint Hamdan married Mohamed bin Zayed Al Nahyan, with whom she has nine children – four sons, and five daughters. They also have two adopted daughters, and 16 grandchildren.

- Sheikha Mariam
- Sheikh Khaled
- Sheikha Shamsa
- Sheikh Theyab
- Sheikh Hamdan
- Sheikha Fatima
- Sheikha Shamma
- Sheikh Zayed
- Sheikha Hassa
- Amina - adopted daughter
- Salha - adopted daughter

Her eldest son, Sheikh Khaled, was named as the crown prince of Abu Dhabi on 30 March 2023.
