= Abu Dhabi Executive Council =

Branch of Abu Dhabi governmernt

- مجلس ابوظبي التنفيذي

Overview
- Established: 1974
- State: Emirate of Abu Dhabi
- Leader: Crown Prince Khaled, Chairman
- Appointed by: Ruler of Abu Dhabi
- Main organ: Abu Dhabi Government
- Website: mediaoffice.abudhabi

The Abu Dhabi Executive Council (ADEC) is the local executive authority of the Government of Abu Dhabi for the Emirate of Abu Dhabi. It assists the ruler of Abu Dhabi in enforcing local and federal decrees and leading the Abu Dhabi government.

The Council holds periodical meetings in Abu Dhabi to discuss issues and memos referred by Abu Dhabi's departments and governmental authorities. These memos often concern the progress of government-sponsored projects, the development of services, reviewing government performance and appointing heads of local departments or agencies.

All governmental departments report to the ADEC, and membership of the ADEC primarily includes the heads of local governmental departments. As of March 2023, the ADEC is chaired by the Crown Prince of Abu Dhabi, Sheikh Khaled bin Mohamed Al Nahyan.

== History ==
In 1971, a council of ministers was formed in the Abu Dhabi emirate by virtue of the provisions of Law No. (1) to reorganise the government apparatus. But in 1974, the said law was superseded and substituted with Law No. (1), which organised Abu Dhabi's government apparatus, renaming the "Council of Ministers" as the "Abu Dhabi Executive Council". The Executive Council is chaired since 2004 by Sheikh Mohammed bin Zayed Al Nahyan, currently president of the United Arab Emirates, ruler of Abu Dhabi and supreme commander of the UAE Armed Forces. Its membership is formed by chairmen of the local government departments, some local authorities and other members appointed by the Ruler.

On Wednesday 13 September 2017, the council was reshuffled and new members were appointed, including: Sheikh Theyab bin Mohamed bin Zayed Al Nahyan, Falah Al Ahbabi, and Mohammed Khalifa Al Mubarak.

On Monday 21 January 2019, the then president of the UAE, Sheikh Khalifa, approved a reorganisation which changed the members of the council:

- Three members left the Council including Maj Gen Mohammed Al Rumaithi, Riyad Abdulrahman Al Mubarak and Dr Ali Al Nuaimi.
- Two new members joined: Sara Awad Issa Musallam, chairwoman of the Department of Education and Knowledge; and Maj Gen Faris Khalaf Al Mazrouei, the new commander-in-chief of Abu Dhabi Police.

As part of this reorganization, Sheikh Mohamed bin Zayed also set up a body affiliated with the council, the Abu Dhabi Strategic Affairs Committee, chaired by Sheikh Tahnoun bin Zayed Al Nahyan, and restructured the council's executive committee.

In March 2023, the ADEC was further restructured with former chairman (and current ruler of Abu Dhabi) Sheikh Mohamed bin Zayed Al Nahyan appointing Sheikh Khaled bin Mohammed bin Zayed as the chairman of the council and adding new members to the council as new heads of government departments and responsibilities.

In May 2023, the newly restructured ADEC led by Sheikh Khaled bin Mohamed Al Nahyan announced the largest housing budget allocation of $23bn for the construction of 76,000 public homes within the emirate.

== Organisation and authority ==
The ADEC is the main governing organ of the Abu Dhabi government, and is responsible for overseeing all local government departments, agencies, and organisations in the Emirate of Abu Dhabi. The ADEC is led by a chairman of the council, who is often the crown prince of Abu Dhabi, and has the authority to decide on priorities, government strategy, and financial budgeting often in line with recommendations and directions from the ruler of Abu Dhabi.

== Abu Dhabi Executive Office ==
Concerning Abu Dhabi Executive Office (Law 18 of 2019) established the Abu Dhabi Executive Office (ADEO) as an independent entity, replacing the Secretariat of the ADEC with a task of supporting the ADEC in administrative duties, legal opinions, researching proposals provided by governmental departments, contracting third-party consultants, and publishing the official gazette. The chairman of the Executive Office also assumes a seat at the ADEC. Since 2019, the ADEO has been led by Sheikh Khaled bin Mohamed Al Nahyan, the son of Sheikh Mohamed bin Zayed Al Nahyan.

== Members ==
The ADEC was restructured in March 2023, and its current members include:

- Sheikh Mohamed bin Zayed Al Nahyan (Ruler of Abu Dhabi)
- Sheikh Khaled bin Mohamed Al Nahyan (Crown Prince of Abu Dhabi and Chairman of Abu Dhabi Executive Office)
- Sheikh Tahnoun bin Zayed Al Nahyan
- Sheikh Hazza bin Zayed Al Nahyan (Vice-chairman of the Executive Council)
- Sheikh Hamed bin Zayed Al Nahyan
- Sheikh Theyab bin Mohamed bin Zayed Al Nahyan (Chairman of Abu Dhabi Crown Prince Court)
- Sheikh Mohammed bin Khalifa bin Zayed Al Nahyan
- Sheikh Sultan bin Tahnoon Al Nahyan
- Khaldoon Khalifa Al Mubarak (Chairman of the Executive Affairs Authority)
- Mohamed Khalifa Al Mubarak (Chairman of the Department of Culture and Tourism)
- Dr. Mugheer Khamis Al Khaili (Chairman of the Department of Community Development)
- Dr. Ahmed Mubarak Al Mazrouei (Secretary-General of the Executive Council)
- Jassem Mohamed Bu Ataba Al Zaabi (Chairman of the Department of Finance)
- Eng. Awaidha Murshed Al Marar (Chairman of the Department of Energy)
- Sheikh Abdulla bin Mohamed bin Butti Al Hamed (Chairman of Department of Health)
- Mohamed Ali Al Shorafa Al Hammadi (Chairman of the Abu Dhabi Department of Municipalities and Transport)
- Ahmed Jasim Al Zaabi (Chairman of Abu Dhabi Department of Economic Development)
- Sara Awad Issa Musallam (Chairman of Abu Dhabi Department of Education and Knowledge)
