= Capital Market Authority (United Arab Emirates) =

Financial regulator in the United Arab Emirates

Capital Market Authority (CMA)
Agency overview
- Formed: January 29, 2000
- Jurisdiction: United Arab Emirates
- Headquarters: 13th floor, Al Gaith Tower, Hamdan Street, Abu Dhabi, UAE
- Agency executives: Mohamed Ali Al Shorafa Al Hammadi, Chairman; Waleed Saeed Abdul Salam Al Awadhi, Chief Executive Officer
- Parent agency: Ministry of Finance
- Website: www.uaecma.gov.ae/en/home

The Capital Market Authority (CMA, formerly known as Securities and Commodities Authority) is a federal financial regulatory agency in the United Arab Emirates. It was established as the Securities and Commodities Authority (SCA) based on Federal Decree No. (4) of 2000 by then-president of the UAE, Sheikh Zayed bin Sultan Al Nahyan and its amendments issued in Federal Law 25 of 2006, amending the former law.

The SCA was replaced with the Capital Market Authority on January 1, 2026, based on the Federal Laws No. (32) and No. (33) of 2025.

The authority is a federal government agency, which is financially and administratively independent, headed by a CEO and a chairman of a board of directors, both appointed by the President of the UAE. The main objective of the authority is to supervise and monitor financial markets in the UAE, including the Dubai Financial Market and the Abu Dhabi Securities Exchange. However, it is not responsible for regulating financial activity in free economic zones such as the Dubai International Financial Centre, which are regulated by independent laws and courts such as the DIFC Courts.

== History ==
The Securities and Commodities Authority (SCA) was established by Federal Law No. (4) of 2000 enacted by Zayed bin Sultan Al Nahyan as the first legislation for securities in the UAE and was initially named Emirates Securities & Commodities Authority and Market. The first two exchange markets, the Abu Dhabi Securities Exchange and the Dubai Financial Market would be founded shortly after in the same year.

In 2004, Dubai established the Dubai Financial Services Authority, which would be the sole regulatory authority for the economic free zone of Dubai International Financial Centre, which included independent exchanges such as Nasdaq Dubai outside of the control of the SCA.

In 2006, UAE president Khalifa bin Zayed Al Nahyan issued Law 25 of 2006 amending certain provisions of the prior law, removing the requirement of the board of directors to represent various governmental departments and the reducing the board of directors from 8 board members to 5 and expanding the requirement for board members to declare any securities or stock they own, or stock owned by the board member's family and minor children.

In 2025, the next UAE president, Mohammed bin Zayed Al Nahyan, issued Decree-Law 32 and Decree-Law 33 to establish the Capital Market Authority, scheduling to replace the Securities and Commodities Authority starting January 1, 2026.

== Organizational structure ==
The CMA's primary purpose is to regulate and supervise the UAE's securities and commodities markets. It is responsible for ensuring market transparency, protecting investors, and enhancing the efficiency of financial markets. It also oversees licensing, compliance, and market monitoring while promoting fair trading practices and investor confidence.

The current chairman of the CMA is Mohamed Ali Al Shorafa.

The SCA is organized into departments that report to the chief executive, which include:

- Policies and Legislations Department
- Issuance and Governance Department
- Enforcement Department
- Licensing Department
- Virtual Assets Supervision Department
- Anti-Money Laundering and Financial Crimes Department
- Inspection and Compliance Department
- Support Services Department

== See also ==
- Dubai Gold & Commodities Exchange
- Dubai Financial Market
- List of financial supervisory authorities by country
