= Mohamed Ali Al Shorafa =

Emirati government official and business leader

His Excellency Mohamed Ali Al Shorafa Al Hammadi
- محمد علي الشرفا

Chairman of the Department of Municipalities and Transport (DMT)
- Incumbent
- Assumed office January 2023

Chairman of Etihad Aviation Group
- Incumbent
- Assumed office 15 August 2021

Vice-Chairman of Abu Dhabi Global Market (ADGM)
- Incumbent
- Assumed office 19 October 2021

Personal details
- Born: Abu Dhabi, United Arab Emirates
- Education: London Business School (MBA)
- Occupation: Government official, Business leader

Mohamed Ali Al Shorafa is an Emirati government official and business leader. He is the Chairman of the Abu Dhabi Department of Municipalities and Transport (DMT) and a member of the Abu Dhabi Executive Council. Since January 2023, he has overseen Abu Dhabi's urban planning, municipal functions, and transport initiatives.

== Government and public sector roles ==
In January 2023, Al Shorafa was reappointed to the Abu Dhabi Executive Council by United Arab Emirates (UAE) President Sheikh Mohamed bin Zayed Al Nahyan. As the Chairman of DMT, Al Shorafa is responsible for Abu Dhabi’s urban planning, municipal services, and transportation strategy. His responsibilities include chairing AD Mobility (formerly the Abu Dhabi Integrated Transport Centre (ITC)) and the Abu Dhabi Projects and Infrastructure Centre (ADPIC), both of which oversee large-scale infrastructure and transport projects within the emirate.

Beyond DMT, Al Shorafa chairs several prominent organisations, including:

- Abu Dhabi Housing Authority (ADHA)
- Etihad Aviation Group which operates Etihad Airways
- Capital Market Authority (CMA)

Additionally, he serves as Vice-Chairman of the Abu Dhabi Global Market (ADGM), and is a board member of:

- Smart and Autonomous Systems Council (SASC)
- Etihad Rail
- Abu Dhabi Transport Company (ADTC)

=== Department of Municipalities and Transport ===
As the head of DMT, Al Shorafa oversees initiatives aimed at enhancing infrastructure and urban development. These include opening the MENA regional office of the World Smart Sustainable Cities Organisation in Abu Dhabi, in partnership with the Seoul Metropolitan Government, to promote sustainable urbanisation.

== Career history ==
Al Shorafa served as Chairman of the Abu Dhabi Department of Economic Development (ADDED) from November 2019 to January 2023. He has also worked in leadership roles within the private sector, including as CEO and Managing Director of UEMedical and Vice-Chairman of United Eastern Group (UEG) and Gulf Contractors Company (GCC).

== Education ==
Al Shorafa holds an MBA from the London Business School and certifications from international institutions, including MIT Sloan and Citibank Global Asset Management. He also completed the Senior Executive Leadership Program (SELP) in Leadership and Strategy at Harvard Business School from 2018 to 2019.

== Recognition ==
Arabian Business has recognised Al Shorafa for his contributions to the economic and development sectors of the United Arab Emirates (UAE). Al Shorafa has also been listed in the Gulf Business list of “Top 100 Arabs 2024”, where he ranked 39th.

== See also ==
- Abu Dhabi Executive Council
- Abu Dhabi Department of Municipalities and Transport
