= Abu Dhabi Judicial Department =

- دائرة القضاء

Agency overview
- Formed: 17 December 2007
- Jurisdiction: Government of Abu Dhabi
- Agency executives: Mansour bin Zayed Al Nahyan, Chairman; Yusef Alebri, Undersecretary; Ali Mohammed Alblooshi, Attorney General
- Website: adjd.gov.ae

The Abu Dhabi Judicial Department (Arabic: دائرة القضاء) is the Abu Dhabi government agency responsible for maintaining the local justice system of Abu Dhabi. The department maintains the emirate's courts (courts of first instance and appeals, and the Abu Dhabi Court of Cassation), an independent public prosecutor office, and a judgement enforcement force.
