= 19th BRICS summit =

2027 international summit in India

2027 BRICS Summit 19th BRICS Summit
- 2027
- Host country: China
- Participants: Brazil; China; Egypt; Ethiopia; India; Indonesia; Iran; Russia; South Africa; United Arab Emirates
- Chair: Xi Jinping

The 19th BRICS Summit is an upcoming international summit of the BRICS nations, scheduled to be hosted by China in 2027 as part of its BRICS chairmanship.

== Background ==
BRICS is an intergovernmental organization comprising Brazil, Russia, India, China, South Africa, and additional member states admitted in recent years. The BRICS summit is held annually, with the chairmanship rotating among member countries.

== Presidency ==
India assumed the BRICS chairmanship on 1 January 2026, succeeding Brazil, which hosted the 18th BRICS Summit in 2025. As chair, India is responsible for organizing the 18th BRICS Summit and associated ministerial and working-group meetings. China succeeds India's presidency in 2027.

== Logo and official website ==
The official logo and website for the BRICS 2027 presidency are not known yet.

== See also ==
- BRICS
- 18th BRICS Summit
