= Dubai Gold & Commodities Exchange =

United Arab Emirates financial exchange

Dubai Gold & Commodities Exchange بورصة دبي للذهب والسلع
- Industry: Derivatives exchange
- Founded: 2005
- Headquarters: Jumeirah Lake Towers, Dubai, United Arab Emirates
- Key people: Ahmed Sultan Bin Sulayem, Chairman - Les Male, CEO
- Number of employees: 50-100
- Website: www.dgcx.ae

The Dubai Gold & Commodities Exchange (DGCX) is a financial and commodity derivatives exchange located in Dubai, the United Arab Emirates. DGCX commenced trading in November 2005 as the first derivatives exchange in the Middle East and North Africa (MENA) region. The Exchange is owned by the Dubai Multi Commodities Centre (DMCC).

The Chairman of the Exchange is Ahmed Bin Sulayem and the Chief Executive Officer is Les Male.

DGCX has 267 members. It is regulated by the Capital Market Authority of the United Arab Emirates, a member of the International Organization of Securities Commissions (IOSCO). The Exchange owns a clearing house called Dubai Commodities Clearing Corporation.

== Product portfolio ==
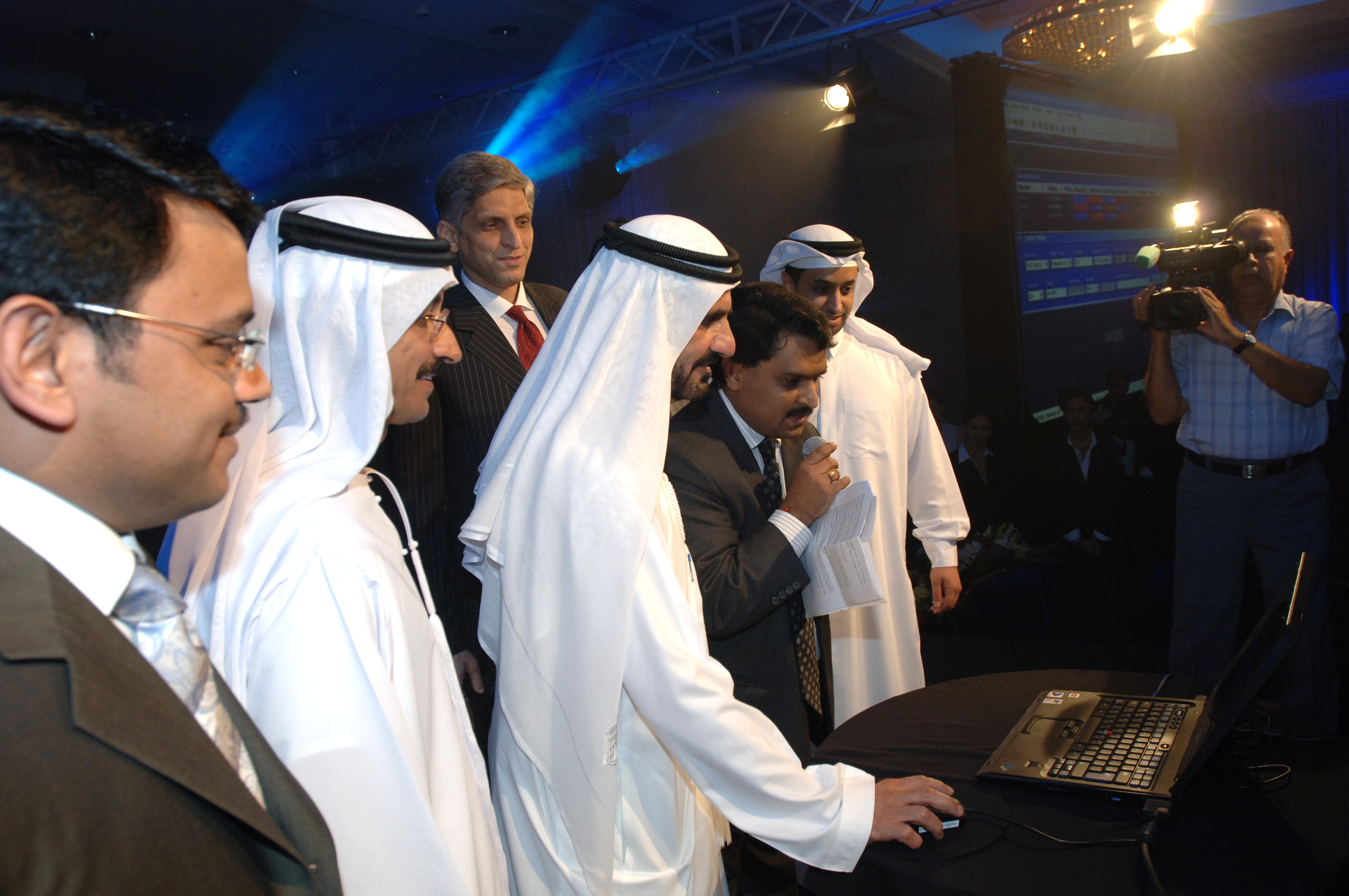
Inauguration of the Dubai Gold & Commodities Exchange in 2005 by Sultan Ahmed bin Sulayem and Mohammed bin Rashid Al Maktoum

DGCX trades in a wide range of derivatives contracts. The DGCX Gold Futures, when launched in 2006, introduced a new pricing benchmark for gold in the UAE – the One kilo bar gold futures contract. In 2007, DGCX launched the world's first Rupee Futures contract, which has seen rapid volumes growth over the last few years driven primarily by demand from the GCC's large non-resident Indian community.

Other products include the world's first steel rebar futures contract (2007); the MENA region's first Copper Futures contract (2012), and the region's first WTI and Brent Oil futures contracts. DGCX's portfolio of currency futures contracts also includes Australian Dollar/US Dollar, Canadian Dollar/US Dollar, Swiss Franc/US Dollar, Euro, British pound, Japanese Yen and Indian Rupee futures.

DGCX launched an Options Contract for the Indian Rupee in 2011. The contract is today the only exchange-traded Indian Rupee Options product offered outside India.

== Clearing House ==
The Exchange provides clearing service through the Dubai Commodities Clearing Corporation (DCCC), a 100% owned subsidiary of DGCX. On 6 February 2024, the Joint Board of Appeal ("the Board") of the European Supervisory Authorities (EBA, EIOPA and ESMA – the ESAs) withdrew the recognition of DCCC as a Tier 1 third-country central counterparty (CCP) over money laundering concerns. The decision was a result from the European Commission's inclusion of the UАЕ on the list of high-risk third countries due to strategic deficiencies in their national anti-money laundering and counter-financing of terrorism ("AML/CFT") regime, as outlined in Commission Delegated Regulation (EU) 2016/1675.

== Membership ==
Over 80% of DGCX's current membership base of 267 is from the Middle East and the Indian subcontinent. The remainder is from the US and Europe. DGCX members are from financial centres such as London, Chicago, Auckland, Mumbai and Karachi.

== Electronic Trading Platform ==
DGCX announced a partnership with Cinnober, in June 2012, to develop a new trading platform, which DGCX hopes will further drive efficiency and liquidity in the DGCX marketplace.

== Awards ==
- "Contract of the Year 2012" award for DGCX Indian Rupee Futures from FOW magazine.
- "Emerging Exchange of the Year 2013" award from FOW magazine.
- "Exchange of the Year" at the Global Investor MENA Awards 2018.
