= Abu Dhabi Department of Health =

Department of Health (Abu Dhabi)
- دائرة الصحة

Agency overview
- Formed: 2007
- Jurisdiction: Government of Abu Dhabi
- Agency executives: Mansoor Ibrahim Al Mansoori, Chairman; Noura Khamis Al Ghaithi, Undersecretary
- Website: doh.gov.ae

The Abu Dhabi Department of Health (Arabic: دائرة الصحة) is an Abu Dhabi government regulative agency for the healthcare sector in the Emirate of Abu Dhabi. It shapes the regulatory framework for the health system (public and private), inspects against regulations and enforces standards in the emirate.

== History ==
The Department of Health (former General Authority of Health Services for the Emirate of Abu Dhabi) was established in 2007 as part of a health system major reform.

In 2011 premarital screening and counseling were introduced with the Jawda initiative, a grading system for pharmaceutical services. Jawda was extended in subsequent years with hospital ratings and the monitoring of key medical services performances such as waiting times, incidents during interventions, unplanned readmissions, infections in interventions, and death rates. Jawda is generated on a quarterly basis. In 2014, 421 Jawda-related audits were carried out, which discovered failures in 4 healthcare centres in complying with room disinfection standards, cleanliness, medical device quality control standards, mixing sterile and non-sterile tools and storing medical files improperly.

In 2018 the Department of Health signed with New York University Abu Dhabi (NYUAD) a Memorandum of Understanding to collaborate on a long-term study to investigate the causes of common chronic diseases among Emiratis. Also in 2018, a new regulation to mandate dispensing of generic medicines was introduced.
