= Khaled bin Mohamed Al Nahyan =

Crown Prince of Abu Dhabi since 2023

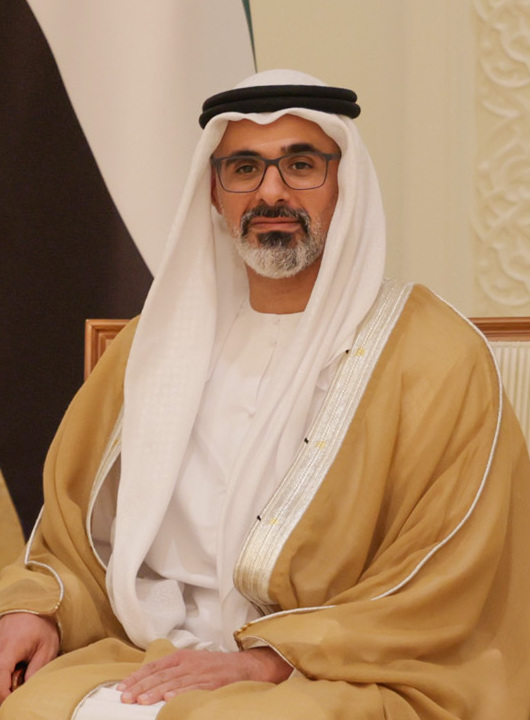
- Khaled in 2023

Crown Prince of Abu Dhabi
- Tenure: 29 March 2023 – present
- Monarch: Mohamed bin Zayed Al Nahyan
- Predecessor: Mohamed bin Zayed Al Nahyan
- Born: 8 January 1982 (age 44); Abu Dhabi, United Arab Emirates
- Spouse: Sheikha Fatima bint Suroor Al Nahyan (m. 2008)
- Issue Detail: Sheikha Shamma bint Khaled Al Nahyan; Sheikh Mohammed bin Khaled Al Nahyan; Sheikha Salama bint Khaled Al Nahyan; Sheikh Zayed bin Khaled Al Nahyan
Names
- Khaled bin Mohamed bin Zayed Al Nahyan
- House: Al Nahyan
- Father: Mohamed bin Zayed Al Nahyan
- Mother: Salama bint Hamdan Al Nahyan

Sheikh Khaled bin Mohamed bin Zayed Al Nahyan (Arabic: خَالِد بن مُحَمَّد بن زَايد آل نَهيَان, romanized: Khālid bin Muḥammad bin Zāyid Āl Nahyān; born 8 January 1982) is Crown Prince of Abu Dhabi. He was appointed to the role on 29 March 2023. He is the eldest son and heir apparent of Sheikh Mohamed bin Zayed Al Nahyan, 3rd President of the United Arab Emirates. His father appointed him to be chair of Abu Dhabi’s Executive Council, the state cabinet.

== Early life and education ==
Sheikh Khaled is the eldest son of Sheikh Mohamed bin Zayed Al Nahyan and a member of Abu Dhabi's ruling Al Nahyan family. His mother is Sheikha Salama bint Hamdan Al Nahyan. Khaled is the older brother of Theyab bin Mohamed bin Zayed Al Nahyan, chairman of the Abu Dhabi Crown Prince's Court and chairman of Etihad Rail.

Khaled graduated from Arizona State University in 2004 with a bachelor's in Political Science, followed by a master's degree from Georgetown University Walsh School of Foreign Service, 2007.

== Career ==
=== Political career ===
On 15 February 2016, Khaled was appointed head of national security. On 16 January 2017, he was named deputy national security adviser.

On 29 March 2023, he was appointed as crown prince of Abu Dhabi and also as chairman of the Abu Dhabi Executive Council. The title of Crown Prince was being argued for by Sheikh Tahnoun bin Zayed before it was ultimately given to Khaled by his father Mohamed bin Zayed. Sheikh Tahnoun was instead appointed to oversee a sovereign wealth fund worth $1.5 trillion. Previously, Khaled was a member of the Abu Dhabi Executive Council and chairman of the Abu Dhabi Executive Office.

Khaled is chair of L’Imad, a $300 billion fund that helped bankroll Paramount's $108 billion takeover of Warner Bros Discovery.

=== Board memberships ===
Sheikh Khaled is a member of Abu Dhabi's Supreme Council for Financial and Economic Affairs. He is a member of the board of directors of Abu Dhabi National Oil Company (ADNOC), and a member of the board of directors of Abu Dhabi Investment Authority (ADIA). He is the chairman of several boards, including the UAE Genomics Council, the executive committee of the board of directors of ADNOC, and the Advanced Technology Research Council (ATRC).

== Personal life ==
Sheikh Khaled is one of the Emirati figures who are mentioned in the Pandora Papers due to his partnership with an offshore investment company. He is involved in these activities through the Desroches Island Limited company of which Khaled is the sole shareholder. His business partners given in the papers include Singapore businessman Ong Beng Seng and Emirati businessman Ali Saeed Juma Albwardy.

His wife is Sheikha Fatima bint Suroor Al Nahyan, and they have two daughters and two sons:

- Shamma bint Khaled Al Nahyan (born 10 October 2011).
- Mohammed bin Khaled Al Nahyan (born 20 December 2013).
- Salama bint Khaled Al Nahyan (born 20 December 2013).
- Zayed bin Khaled Al Nahyan (born 11 March 2025).

His brother is Theyab bin Mohamed bin Zayed Al Nahyan, member of the Executive Council, and chairman of the Crown Prince Court, the Early Childhood Authority, Abu Dhabi Transport Company, and Etihad Rail.

== Honours ==
- Bahrain: First Class of the King Hamad Order of the Renaissance (26 November 2024)
- Malaysia: Honorary Grand Commander of the Order of the Defender of the Realm (23 May 2023)
- Pahang: Member 2nd Class of the Family Order of the Crown of Indra of Pahang (23 May 2023)

== See also ==
- Timeline of Abu Dhabi
