= List of cabinets of the United Arab Emirates =

The following is a list of cabinets of the federal government of the United Arab Emirates since its founding in 1971.

== List of cabinets ==
=== First cabinet ===
The first cabinet of the United Arab Emirates was formed on 9 December 1971, and was headed by Sheikh Maktoum bin Rashid Al Maktoum.

Office	Office holder	Took office	Left office
Prime Minister	Sheikh Maktoum bin Rashid Al Maktoum	9 December 1971	
Deputy Prime Minister	Sheikh Hamdan bin Rashid Al Maktoum	9 December 1971	23 December 1973
Minister of Finance, Economy and Industry	Sheikh Hamdan bin Rashid Al Maktoum	9 December 1971	
Minister of Defense	Sheikh Mohammed bin Rashid Al Maktoum	9 December 1971	
Minister of Interior	Sheikh Mubarak bin Mohammed Al Nahyan	9 December 1971	
Minister of Foreign Affairs	Ahmed bin Khalifa Al Suwaidi	9 December 1971	
Minister of Justice	Abdullah Omran Taryam	9 December 1971	19 February 1972
Minister of Justice	Ahmad bin Sultan Al Qasimi	19 February 1972	
Minister of Agriculture and Fisheries	Sheikh Hamad bin Mohammed Al Sharqi	9 December 1971	
Minister of Education	Sheikh Sultan bin Muhammad Al-Qasimi	9 December 1971	19 February 1972
Minister of Education	Abdullah Omran Taryam	19 February 1972	
Minister of Electricity (Acting)	Mohammed Saeed Al Mulla	9 December 1971	23 December 1973
Minister of State for Federation and Gulf Affairs	Mohammed Saeed Al Mulla	9 December 1971	23 December 1973
Minister of Health	Sheikh Sultan bin Ahmed Al Mualla	9 December 1971	23 December 1973
Minister of Information	Sheikh Ahmed bin Hamed Al Hamed	9 December 1971	
Minister of Labour and Social Affairs	Thani bin Issa Hareb	9 December 1971	23 December 1973
Minister of Planning	Mohammed Khalifa Al Kindi	9 December 1971	
Minister of Housing (Acting)	Mohammed Khalifa Al Kindi	9 December 1971	23 December 1973
Minister of Public Works	Sheikh Mohammed bin Sultan Al Qasimi	9 December 1971	23 December 1973
Minister of Transport	Sheikh Abdulaziz bin Rashid Al Nuaimi	9 December 1971	23 December 1973
Minister of Youth and Sports	Rashid bin Humaid	9 December 1971	
Minister of State for Cabinet Affairs	Otaiba bin Abdullah Al Otaiba	24 December 1972	
Minister of State for Federation and Gulf Affairs	Mohammed Saeed Al Mulla	9 December 1971	23 December 1973
Minister of State for Financial and Economic Affairs	Ahmed bin Sultan bin Sulayem	9 December 1971	23 December 1973
Minister of State for Interior Affairs	Hammouda bin Ali	2 May 1972	
Minister of State for Supreme Council Affairs	Mohammed Habroush Al Suweidi	9 December 1971	23 December 1973
Minister of State	Mohammed Habroush Al Suweidi	9 December 1971	
Minister of State	Sheikh Hamad bin Saif Al Sharqi	21 December 1971	

=== Second cabinet ===
The second cabinet of the United Arab Emirates was formed on the 23 December 1973, and was headed by Sheikh Maktoum bin Rashid Al Maktoum.

Office	Office holder	Took office	Left office
Prime Minister	Sheikh Maktoum bin Rashid Al Maktoum	Incumbent	
Deputy Prime Minister	Sheikh Khalifa bin Zayed Al Nahyan	23 December 1973	1977
Minister of Defense	Sheikh Mohammed bin Rashid Al Maktoum	Incumbent	
Minister of Finance and Industry	Sheikh Hamdan bin Rashid Al Maktoum	Incumbent	
Minister of Interior	Sheikh Mubarak bin Mohammed Al Nahyan	Incumbent	
Minister of Foreign Affairs	Ahmed bin Khalifa Al Suwaidi	Incumbent	
Minister of Justice	Ahmad bin Sultan Al Qasimi	Incumbent	1977
Minister of Agriculture and Fisheries	Sheikh Hamad bin Mohammed Al Sharqi	Incumbent	18 September 1974
Minister of Economy and Trade	Sheikh Sultan bin Ahmed Al Mualla	23 December 1973	
Minister of Education	Abdullah Omran Taryam	Incumbent	
Minister of Electricity and Water	Sheikh Abdullah bin Humaid Al Qasimi	23 December 1973	1977
Minister of Health	Sheikh Saif bin Mohammed Al Nahyan	23 December 1973	1977
Minister of Housing	Saeed Mohammed Salman	23 December 1973	1977
Minister of Information and Tourism	Sheikh Ahmed bin Hamed Al Hamed	Incumbent	
Minister of Islamic Affairs and Awqaf	Thani bin Issa Hareb	23 December 1973	1977
Minister of Labour	Sheikh Mohammed bin Sultan Al Qasimi	23 December 1973	1977
Minister of Oil and Minerals	Mana Saeed Al Otaiba	23 December 1973	
Minister of Planning	Mohammed Khalifa Al Kindi	Incumbent	1977
Minister of Public Works	Sheikh Hamdan bin Mohammed Al Nahyan	23 December 1973	1977
Minister of Social Affairs	Sheikh Abdulaziz bin Rashid Al Nuaimi	23 December 1973	1977
Minister of Transport	Mohammed Saeed Al Mulla	23 December 1973	
Minister of Youth and Sports	Rashid bin Humaid	Incumbent	1977
Minister of State for Finance and Industry	Mohammed Habroush Al Suweidi	23 December 1973	1977
Minister of State	Mohammed Habroush Al Suweidi	Incumbent	1977
Minister of State for Foreign Affairs	Saif Saeed Ghobash	23 December 1973	25 October 1977
Minister of State for Information Affairs	Saeed Al Gaith	23 December 1973	
Minister of State for Interior Affairs	Hammouda bin Ali	Incumbent	
Minister of State for Supreme Council Affairs	Abdulmalek Kayed Al Qasimi	23 December 1973	1977
Minister of State	Sheikh Hamad bin Saif Al Sharqi	Incumbent	1977
Minister of State	Ahmed bin Sultan bin Sulayem	24 December 1973	1977

=== Third cabinet ===
The third cabinet of the United Arab Emirates was formed in 1977, and was headed by Sheikh Maktoum bin Rashid Al Maktoum.

Office	Office holder	Took office	Left office
Prime Minister	Sheikh Maktoum bin Rashid Al Maktoum	Incumbent	30 April 1979
Prime Minister	Sheikh Rashid bin Saeed Al Maktoum	30 April 1979	
Deputy Prime Minister	Sheikh Maktoum bin Rashid Al Maktoum	30 April 1979	
Deputy Prime Minister	Hamdan bin Mohammed Al Nahyan	1977	1 July 1979
Minister of Defense	Sheikh Mohammed bin Rashid Al Maktoum	Incumbent	
Minister of Finance and Industry	Sheikh Hamdan bin Rashid Al Maktoum	Incumbent	
Minister of Interior	Sheikh Mubarak bin Mohammed Al Nahyan	Incumbent	
Minister of Foreign Affairs	Ahmed bin Khalifa Al Suwaidi	Incumbent	
Minister of Justice, Islamic Affairs and Awqaf	Mohammed Abdulrahman Al Bakr	1977	1 July 1979
Minister of Agriculture and Fisheries	Saeed Mohammed Al Raqbani	1977	
Minister of Economy and Trade	Sheikh Sultan bin Ahmed Al Mualla	Incumbent	
Minister of Education and Youth	Abdullah Omran Taryam	Incumbent	1 July 1979
Minister of Electricity and Water	Thani bin Issa Hareb	1977	1 July 1979
Minister of Health	Khalfan Mohammed Al Roumi	1977	1 July 1979
Minister of Information and Culture	Sheikh Ahmed bin Hamed Al Hamed	Incumbent	
Minister of Labour and Social Affairs	Abdulla Humaid Al Mazrouei	1977	1 July 1979
Minister of Oil and Minerals	Mana Saeed Al Otaiba	Incumbent	
Minister of Planning	Saeed Ahmed Ghobash	1977	
Minister of Public Works and Housing	Mohammed Khalifa Al Kindi	1977	
Minister of Transport	Mohammed Saeed Al Mulla	Incumbent	
Minister of State for Cabinet Affairs	Saeed Al Gaith	1977	
Minister of State for Foreign Affairs	Rashid Abdulla	1977	1 July 1979
Minister of State for Interior Affairs	Hammouda bin Ali	Incumbent	
Minister of State for Supreme Council Affairs	Sheikh Abdulaziz bin Humaid Al Qasimi	1977	
Minister of State	Sheikh Ahmed bin Sultan Al Qasimi	1977	

=== Fourth cabinet ===
The fourth cabinet of the United Arab Emirates was formed on 1 July 1979, and was headed by Sheikh Rashid bin Saeed Al Maktoum, this was followed by four cabinet reshuffles.

Office	Office holder	Took office	Left office
Prime Minister	Sheikh Rashid bin Saeed Al Maktoum	Incumbent	7 October 1990
Prime Minister	Sheikh Maktoum bin Rashid Al Maktoum	7 October 1990	
Deputy Prime Minister	Sheikh Maktoum bin Rashid Al Maktoum	Incumbent	7 October 1990
Deputy Prime Minister	Sheikh Sultan bin Zayed Al Nahyan	Incumbent	
Minister of Defense	Sheikh Mohammed bin Rashid Al Maktoum	Incumbent	
Minister of Finance and Industry	Sheikh Hamdan bin Rashid Al Maktoum	Incumbent	
Minister of Interior	Sheikh Mubarak bin Mohammed Al Nahyan	Incumbent	20 November 1990
Minister of Foreign Affairs	Ahmed bin Khalifa Al Suwaidi	Incumbent	20 November 1990
Minister of Justice, Islamic Affairs and Awqaf	Mohammed Abdulrahman Al Bakr	Incumbent	7 July 1983
Minister of Justice, Islamic Affairs and Awqaf	Mohammed Ahmed Al Khazraji	11 March 1989	20 November 1990
Minister of Islamic Affairs and Awqaf	Mohammed Ahmed Al Khazraji	7 July 1983	11 March 1989
Minister of Justice	Abdulla Humaid Al Mazrouei	7 July 1983	11 March 1989
Minister of Agriculture and Fisheries	Saeed Mohammed Al Raqbani	Incumbent	
Minister of Communications	Mohammed Saeed Al Mulla	1 July 1979	20 November 1990
Minister of Economy and Trade	Sheikh Sultan bin Ahmed Al Mualla	Incumbent	7 July 1983
Minister of Economy and Trade	Saif Ali Al Jarwan	7 July 1983	20 November 1990
Minister of Education and Youth	Saeed Mohammed Salman	1 July 1979	7 July 1983
Minister of Education and Youth	Faraj Fadel Al Mazroui	7 July 1983	20 November 1990
Minister of Electricity and Water	Humaid Nasser Al Owais	1 July 1979	
Minister of Health	Hamad Abdulrahman Almadfa	1 July 1979	20 November 1990
Minister of Information and Culture	Sheikh Ahmed bin Hamed Al Hamed	Incumbent	20 November 1990
Minister of Labour and Social Affairs	Saif Ali Al Jarwan	1 July 1979	7 July 1983
Minister of Labour and Social Affairs	Khalfan Mohammed Al Roumi	7 July 1983	20 November 1990
Minister of Oil and Minerals	Mana Saeed Al Otaiba	Incumbent	20 November 1990
Minister of Planning	Saeed Ahmed Ghobash	Incumbent	7 July 1983
Minister of Planning	Sheikh Humaid bin Ahmed Al Mualla	7 July 1983	
Minister of Public Works and Housing	Mohammed Khalifa Al Kindi	Incumbent	20 November 1990
Minister of Transport	Mohammed Saeed Al Mulla	Incumbent	
Minister of State for Cabinet Affairs	Saeed Al Gaith	Incumbent	
Minister of State for Financial Affairs and Industry	Ahmed Humaid Al Tayer	7 July 1983	
Minister of State for Interior Affairs	Hammouda bin Ali	Incumbent	20 November 1990
Minister of State for Supreme Council Affairs	Sheikh Abdulaziz bin Humaid Al Qasimi	Incumbent	23 April 1989
Minister of State for Supreme Council Affairs	Saeed Ahmed Ghobash	23 April 1989	20 November 1990
Minister of State	Sheikh Ahmed bin Sultan Al Qasimi	Incumbent	20 November 1990

=== Fifth cabinet ===
The fifth cabinet of the United Arab Emirates was formed on the 20 November 1990, following the death of Sheikh Rashid bin Saeed Al Maktoum on 7 October 1990 and was headed by Sheikh Maktoum bin Rashid Al Maktoum.

Office	Office holder	Took office	Left office
Prime Minister	Sheikh Maktoum bin Rashid Al Maktoum	Incumbent	
Deputy Prime Minister	Sheikh Sultan bin Zayed Al Nahyan	Incumbent	
Minister of Defense	Sheikh Mohammed bin Rashid Al Maktoum	Incumbent	
Minister of Finance and Industry	Sheikh Hamdan bin Rashid Al Maktoum	Incumbent	
Minister of Interior	Hammouda bin Ali	20 November 1990	25 March 1997
Minister of Foreign Affairs	Sheikh Rashid Abdullah Al Nuaimi	20 November 1990	
Minister of Justice	Abdullah Omran Taryam	20 November 1990	25 March 1997
Minister of Agriculture and Fisheries	Saeed Mohammed Al Raqbani	Incumbent	
Minister of Economy and Trade	Saeed Ahmed Ghobash	20 November 1990	25 March 1997
Minister of Education	Hamad Abdulrahman Almadfa	20 November 1990	25 March 1997
Minister of Electricity and Water	Humaid Nasser Al Owais	Incumbent	
Minister of Health	Ahmed Saeed Al Badi	20 November 1990	25 March 1997
Minister of Higher Education	Sheikh Nahyan bin Mubarak Al Nahyan	26 January 1992	
Minister of Information and Culture	Khalfan Mohammed Al Roumi	20 November 1990	25 March 1997
Minister of Islamic Affairs and Awqaf	Mohammed Ahmed Al Khazraji	20 November 1990	25 March 1997
Minister of Labour and Social Affairs	Saif Ali Al Jarwan	20 November 1990	25 March 1997
Minister of Oil and Minerals	Yousef bin Omair	20 November 1990	25 March 1997
Minister of Planning	Sheikh Humaid bin Ahmed Al Mualla	Incumbent	
Minister of Public Works and Housing	Sheikh Rakkad Al Ameri	20 November 1990	25 March 1997
Minister of Transport	Mohammed Saeed Al Mulla	Incumbent	25 March 1997
Minister of Youth and Sports	Sheikh Faisal bin Khalid Al Qasimi	20 November 1990	25 March 1997
Minister of State for Cabinet Affairs	Saeed Al Gaith	Incumbent	
Minister of State for Financial Affairs and Industry	Ahmed Humaid Al Tayer	Incumbent	25 March 1997
Minister of State for Foreign Affairs	Sheikh Hamdan bin Zayed Al Nahyan	20 November 1990	25 March 1997
Minister of State for Supreme Council Affairs	Sheikh Mohammed bin Saqr Al Qasimi	20 November 1990	25 March 1997

=== Sixth cabinet ===
The sixth cabinet of the United Arab Emirates was formed on the 25 March 1997, and was headed by Sheikh Maktoum bin Rashid Al Maktoum.

Office	Office holder	Took office	Left office
Prime Minister	Sheikh Maktoum bin Rashid Al Maktoum	Incumbent	4 January 2006
Prime Minister	Sheikh Mohammed bin Rashid Al Maktoum	5 January 2006	
Deputy Prime Minister	Sheikh Sultan bin Zayed Al Nahyan	Incumbent	
Deputy Prime Minister	Sheikh Hamdan bin Zayed Al Nahyan	25 March 1997	
Minister of Defense	Sheikh Mohammed bin Rashid Al Maktoum	Incumbent	
Minister of Finance and Industry	Sheikh Hamdan bin Rashid Al Maktoum	Incumbent	
Minister of Interior	Mohammed Saeed Al Badi	25 March 1997	1 November 2004
Minister of Interior	Sheikh Saif bin Zayed Al Nahyan	1 November 2004	
Minister of Foreign Affairs	Sheikh Rashid Abdullah Al Nuaimi	Incumbent	11 February 2006
Minister of Justice, Islamic Affairs and Awqaf	Mohammed Nukhaira Al Dhaheri	25 March 1997	
Minister of Agriculture and Fisheries	Saeed Mohammed Al Raqbani	Incumbent	11 February 2006
Minister of Economy and Trade	Sheikh Fahim bin Sultan Al Qassimi	25 March 1997	11 February 2006
Minister of Education and Youth	Abdulaziz Al Sharhan	25 March 1997	11 February 2006
Minister of Electricity and Water	Humaid Nasser Al Owais	Incumbent	11 February 2006
Minister of Health	Hamad Abdulrahman Almadfa	Incumbent	11 February 2006
Minister of Higher Education and Scientific Research	Sheikh Nahyan bin Mubarak Al Nahyan	Incumbent	
Minister of Information and Culture	Sheikh Abdullah bin Zayed Al Nahyan	25 March 1997	11 February 2006
Minister of Labour and Social Affairs	Mattar Humaid Al Tayer	25 March 1997	11 February 2006
Minister of Oil and Minerals	Obeid bin Saif Al Nassiri	25 March 1997	11 February 2006
Minister of Planning	Sheikh Humaid bin Ahmed Al Mualla	Incumbent	11 February 2006
Minister of Presidential Affairs	Sheikh Mansour bin Zayed Al Nahyan	1 November 2004	
Minister of Public Works and Housing	Rakad bin Salem Al Rakad	25 March 1997	11 February 2006
Minister of Transport	Ahmed Humaid Al Tayer	25 March 1997	11 February 2006
Minister of State for Cabinet Affairs	Saeed Khalfan Al Ghaith	Incumbent	11 February 2006
Minister of State for Financial and Industrial Affairs	Mohammed Khalfan bin Kharbash	25 March 1997	

=== Seventh cabinet ===
The seventh cabinet of the United Arab Emirates was formed on the 11 February 2006, following the death of Sheikh Maktoum bin Rashid Al Maktoum on 4 January 2006 and was headed by Sheikh Mohammed bin Rashid Al Maktoum.

Office	Office holder	Took office	Left office
Prime Minister; Minister of Defence	Sheikh Mohammed bin Rashid Al Maktoum	Incumbent	
Deputy Prime Minister	Sheikh Sultan bin Zayed Al Nahyan	Incumbent	
Deputy Prime Minister	Sheikh Hamdan bin Zayed Al Nahyan	Incumbent	
Minister of Finance and Industry	Sheikh Hamdan bin Rashid Al Maktoum	Incumbent	
Minister of Interior	Sheikh Saif bin Zayed Al Nahyan	Incumbent	
Minister of Foreign Affairs	Sheikh Abdullah bin Zayed Al Nahyan	11 February 2006	
Minister of Justice	Mohammed Nukhaira Al Dhaheri	Incumbent	17 February 2008
Minister of Culture, Youth and Community Development	Abdul Rahman Mohammed Al Owais	11 February 2006	
Minister of Economy	Sheikha Lubna bint Khalid Al Qasimi	11 February 2006	17 February 2008
Minister of Education	Hanif Hassan Ali	11 February 2006	
Minister of Energy	Mohammed bin Dhaen Al Hameli	11 February 2006	
Minister of Environment and Water	Mohammed Saeed Al Kindi	11 February 2006	17 February 2008
Minister of Governmental Sector Development	Sultan bin Saeed Al Mansouri	11 February 2006	17 February 2008
Minister of Health	Humaid Mohammed Obeid Al Qattami	11 February 2006	
Minister of Higher Education and Scientific Research	Sheikh Nahyan bin Mubarak Al Nahyan	Incumbent	
Minister of Labour	Ali bin Abdullah Al Kaabi	11 February 2006	17 February 2008
Minister of Presidential Affairs	Sheikh Mansour bin Zayed Al Nahyan	Incumbent	
Minister of Public Works	Sheikh Hamdan bin Mubarak Al Nahyan	11 February 2006	
Minister of Social Affairs	Mariam Mohammed Khalfan Al Roumi	11 February 2006	
Minister of State for Cabinet Affairs	Mohammed Abdullah Al Gargawi	11 February 2006	
Minister of State for Federal National Council Affairs	Anwar Mohammed Gargash	11 February 2006	
Minister of State for Financial and Industrial Affairs	Mohammed Khalfan bin Kharbash	Incumbent	17 February 2008
Minister of State for Foreign Affairs	Mohammed Hussein Al Shaali	11 February 2006	17 February 2008

=== ِEighth cabinet ===
The eighth cabinet of the United Arab Emirates was formed on the 17 February 2008 and was headed by Sheikh Mohammed bin Rashid Al Maktoum.

Office	Office holder	Took office	Left office
Prime Minister; Minister of Defence	Sheikh Mohammed bin Rashid Al Maktoum	Incumbent	
Deputy Prime Minister	Sheikh Sultan bin Zayed Al Nahyan	Incumbent	12 May 2009
Deputy Prime Minister	Sheikh Hamdan bin Zayed Al Nahyan	Incumbent	12 May 2009
Minister of Finance and Industry	Sheikh Hamdan bin Rashid Al Maktoum	Incumbent	
Minister of Interior	Sheikh Saif bin Zayed Al Nahyan	Incumbent	
Minister of Foreign Affairs	Sheikh Abdullah bin Zayed Al Nahyan	Incumbent	
Minister of Justice	Hadef Jouan Al Dhaheri	17 February 2008	
Minister of Cabinet Affairs	Mohammed Abdullah Al Gargawi	Incumbent	
Minister of Culture, Youth and Community Development	Abdul Rahman Mohammed Al Owais	Incumbent	
Minister of Economy	Sultan bin Saeed Al Mansouri	17 February 2008	
Minister of Education	Hanif Hassan Ali	Incumbent	12 May 2009
Minister of Energy	Mohammed bin Dhaen Al Hameli	Incumbent	3 August 2008
Minister of Environment and Water	Rashid Ahmad bin Fahad	17 February 2008	
Minister of Foreign Trade	Sheikha Lubna bint Khalid Al Qasimi	17 February 2008	12 May 2009
Minister of Health	Humaid Mohammed Obeid Al Qattami	Incumbent	12 May 2009
Minister of Higher Education and Scientific Research	Sheikh Nahyan bin Mubarak Al Nahyan	Incumbent	
Minister of Labour	Saqr Ghobash	Incumbent	
Minister of Presidential Affairs	Sheikh Mansour bin Zayed Al Nahyan	Incumbent	
Minister of Public Works	Sheikh Hamdan bin Mubarak Al Nahyan	Incumbent	12 May 2009
Minister of Social Affairs	Mariam Mohammed Khalfan Al Roumi	Incumbent	
Minister of State for Federal National Council Affairs	Anwar Mohammed Gargash	Incumbent	
Minister of State for Foreign Affairs	Obaid Humaid Al Tayer	17 February 2008	12 May 2009
Minister of State	Maitha Salem Al Shamsi	Incumbent	12 May 2009
Minister of State	Khalifa Bakheet Al Falasi	Incumbent	12 May 2009
Minister of State	Reem Al Hashimy	Incumbent	

=== Ninth cabinet ===
The ninth cabinet of the United Arab Emirates was formed on the 12 May 2009 and was headed by Sheikh Mohammed bin Rashid Al Maktoum.

Office	Office holder	Took office	Left office
Prime Minister; Minister of Defence	Sheikh Mohammed bin Rashid Al Maktoum	Incumbent	
Deputy Prime Minister	Sheikh Mansour bin Zayed Al Nahyan	12 May 2009	
Minister of Presidential Affairs	Sheikh Mansour bin Zayed Al Nahyan	Incumbent	
Deputy Prime Minister	Sheikh Saif bin Zayed Al Nahyan	12 May 2009	
Minister of Interior	Sheikh Saif bin Zayed Al Nahyan	Incumbent	
Minister of Finance and Industry	Sheikh Hamdan bin Rashid Al Maktoum	Incumbent	
Minister of Foreign Affairs	Sheikh Abdullah bin Zayed Al Nahyan	Incumbent	
Minister of Justice	Hadef Jouan Al Dhaheri	Incumbent	
Minister of Cabinet Affairs	Mohammed Abdullah Al Gargawi	Incumbent	
Minister of Culture, Youth and Community Development	Abdul Rahman Mohammed Al Owais	Incumbent	12 March 2013
Minister of Economy	Sultan bin Saeed Al Mansouri	Incumbent	
Minister of Education	Humaid Mohammed Obeid Al Qattami	12 May 2009	
Minister of Energy	Mohammed bin Dhaen Al Hameli	Incumbent	12 March 2013
Minister of Environment and Water	Rashid Ahmad bin Fahad	Incumbent	
Minister of Foreign Trade	Sheikha Lubna bint Khalid Al Qasimi	Incumbent	12 March 2013
Minister of Health	Hanif Hassan Ali	12 May 2009	13 September 2011
Minister of Health	Abdul Rahman Mohammed Al Owais (Acting)	13 September 2011	
Minister of Higher Education and Scientific Research	Sheikh Nahyan bin Mubarak Al Nahyan	Incumbent	12 March 2013
Minister of Labour	Saqr Ghobash	Incumbent	
Minister of Public Works	Sheikh Hamdan bin Mubarak Al Nahyan	Incumbent	12 March 2013
Minister of Social Affairs	Mariam Mohammed Khalfan Al Roumi	Incumbent	
Minister of State for Federal National Council Affairs	Anwar Mohammed Gargash	Incumbent	
Minister of State for Foreign Affairs	Anwar Mohammed Gargash	12 May 2009	
Minister of State for Financial Affairs	Obaid Humaid Al Tayer	12 May 2009	
Minister of State	Maitha Salem Al Shamsi	Incumbent	
Minister of State	Reem Al Hashimy	Incumbent	

=== Tenth cabinet ===
The tenth cabinet of the United Arab Emirates was formed on the 12 March 2013 and was headed by Sheikh Mohammed bin Rashid Al Maktoum.

Office	Office holder	Took office	Left office
Prime Minister; Minister of Defence	Sheikh Mohammed bin Rashid Al Maktoum	Incumbent	
Deputy Prime Minister; Minister of Presidential Affairs	Sheikh Mansour bin Zayed Al Nahyan	Incumbent	
Deputy Prime Minister; Minister of Interior	Sheikh Saif bin Zayed Al Nahyan	Incumbent	
Minister of Finance and Industry	Sheikh Hamdan bin Rashid Al Maktoum	Incumbent	
Minister of Foreign Affairs	Sheikh Abdullah bin Zayed Al Nahyan	Incumbent	
Minister of Justice	Hadef Jouan Al Dhaheri	Incumbent	5 July 2014
Minister of Cabinet Affairs	Mohammed Abdullah Al Gargawi	Incumbent	
Minister of Culture, Youth and Community Development	Sheikh Nahyan bin Mubarak Al Nahyan	12 March 2013	
Minister of Development and International Cooperation	Sheikha Lubna bint Khalid Al Qasimi	12 March 2013	
Minister of Economy	Sultan bin Saeed Al Mansouri	Incumbent	
Minister of Education	Humaid Mohammed Obeid Al Qattami	Incumbent	5 July 2014
Minister of Energy	Suhail Al Mazroui	12 March 2013	
Minister of Environment and Water	Rashid Ahmad bin Fahad	Incumbent	
Minister of Health	Abdul Rahman Mohammed Al Owais	12 March 2013	
Minister of Higher Education and Scientific Research	Sheikh Hamdan bin Mubarak Al Nahyan	12 March 2013	
Minister of Labour	Saqr Ghobash	Incumbent	
Minister of Public Works	Abdullah Al Nuaimi	12 March 2013	
Minister of Social Affairs	Mariam Mohammed Khalfan Al Roumi	Incumbent	
Minister of State for Federal National Council Affairs; Minister of State for Foreign Affairs	Anwar Mohammed Gargash	Incumbent	
Minister of State for Financial Affairs	Obaid Humaid Al Tayer	Incumbent	
Minister of State	Abdullah Ghobash	12 March 2013	
Minister of State	Maitha Salem Al Shamsi	Incumbent	
Minister of State	Reem Al Hashimy	Incumbent	
Minister of State	Sultan Al Jaber	12 March 2013	

=== Eleventh cabinet ===
The eleventh cabinet of the United Arab Emirates was formed on the 5 July 2014 and was headed by Sheikh Mohammed bin Rashid Al Maktoum.

Office	Office holder	Took office	Left office
Prime Minister; Minister of Defence	Sheikh Mohammed bin Rashid Al Maktoum	Incumbent	
Deputy Prime Minister; Minister of Presidential Affairs	Sheikh Mansour bin Zayed Al Nahyan	Incumbent	
Deputy Prime Minister; Minister of Interior	Sheikh Saif bin Zayed Al Nahyan	Incumbent	
Minister of Finance and Industry	Sheikh Hamdan bin Rashid Al Maktoum	Incumbent	
Minister of Foreign Affairs	Sheikh Abdullah bin Zayed Al Nahyan	Incumbent	
Minister of Justice	Sultan Saeed Al Badi	5 July 2014	
Minister of Cabinet Affairs	Mohammed Abdullah Al Gargawi	Incumbent	
Minister of Culture, Youth and Community Development	Sheikh Nahyan bin Mubarak Al Nahyan	Incumbent	
Minister of Development and International Cooperation	Sheikha Lubna bint Khalid Al Qasimi	Incumbent	
Minister of Economy	Sultan bin Saeed Al Mansouri	Incumbent	
Minister of Education	Hussain Al Hammadi	5 July 2014	
Minister of Energy	Suhail Al Mazroui	Incumbent	
Minister of Environment and Water	Rashid Ahmad bin Fahad	Incumbent	
Minister of Health	Abdul Rahman Mohammed Al Owais	Incumbent	
Minister of Higher Education and Scientific Research	Sheikh Hamdan bin Mubarak Al Nahyan	Incumbent	
Minister of Labour	Saqr Ghobash	Incumbent	
Minister of Public Works	Abdullah Al Nuaimi	Incumbent	
Minister of Social Affairs	Mariam Mohammed Khalfan Al Roumi	Incumbent	
Minister of State for Federal National Council Affairs; Minister of State for Foreign Affairs	Anwar Mohammed Gargash	Incumbent	
Minister of State for Financial Affairs	Obaid Humaid Al Tayer	Incumbent	
Minister of State	Abdullah Ghobash	Incumbent	
Minister of State	Maitha Salem Al Shamsi	Incumbent	
Minister of State	Reem Al Hashimy	Incumbent	
Minister of State	Sultan Al Jaber	Incumbent	

=== Twelfth cabinet ===
The twelfth cabinet of the United Arab Emirates was formed on the 11 February 2016 and was headed by Sheikh Mohammed bin Rashid Al Maktoum.

Office	Office holder	Took office	Left office
Prime Minister; Minister of Defence	Sheikh Mohammed bin Rashid Al Maktoum	Incumbent	
Deputy Prime Minister; Minister of Presidential Affairs	Sheikh Mansour bin Zayed Al Nahyan	Incumbent	
Deputy Prime Minister; Minister of Interior	Sheikh Saif bin Zayed Al Nahyan	Incumbent	
Minister of Finance and Industry	Sheikh Hamdan bin Rashid Al Maktoum	Incumbent	
Minister of Foreign Affairs	Sheikh Abdullah bin Zayed Al Nahyan	Incumbent	
Minister of Justice	Sultan Saeed Al Badi	Incumbent	
Minister of Artificial Intelligence	Omar Al Olama	20 October 2017	
Minister of Cabinet Affairs and the Future	Mohammed Abdullah Al Gargawi	Incumbent	
Minister of Climate Change and Environment	Thani bin Ahmed Al Zeyoudi	11 February 2016	
Minister of Community Development	Najla Mohammad Al Awar	11 February 2016	20 October 2017
Minister of Culture and Youth	Sheikh Nahyan bin Mubarak Al Nahyan	11 February 2016	20 October 2017
Minister of Economy	Sultan bin Saeed Al Mansouri	Incumbent	
Minister of Education	Hussain Al Hammadi	Incumbent	
Minister of Energy	Suhail Al Mazroui	Incumbent	
Minister of Happiness	Mariam Mohammed Khalfan Al Roumi	Incumbent	
Minister of Health	Abdul Rahman Mohammed Al Owais	Incumbent	
Minister of Higher Education and Scientific Research	Sheikh Hamdan bin Mubarak Al Nahyan	Incumbent	19 December 2016
Minister of Human Resources and Emiratization	Saqr Ghobash	11 February 2016	20 October 2017
Minister of Public Works	Abdullah Al Nuaimi	Incumbent	
Minister of Tolerance	Sheikha Lubna bint Khalid Al Qasimi	11 February 2016	20 October 2017
Minister of State for Defence Affairs	Mohammed Ahmed Al Bowardi	11 February 2016	
Minister of State for Federal National Council Affairs	Noura Al Kaabi	11 February 2016	20 October 2017
Minister of State for Financial Affairs	Obaid Humaid Al Tayer	Incumbent	
Minister of State for Foreign Affairs	Anwar Mohammed Gargash	Incumbent	
Minister of State for Higher Education	Ahmad Belhoul Al Falasi	11 February 2016	
Minister of State for International Cooperation	Reem Al Hashimy	11 February 2016	
Minister of State for Public Education	Jameela Salem Al Muhairi	11 February 2016	
Minister of State for Youth Affairs	Shamma Al Mazrui	11 February 2016	
Minister of State	Maitha Salem Al Shamsi	Incumbent	
Minister of State	Rashid Ahmad bin Fahad	11 February 2016	
Minister of State	Sultan Al Jaber	Incumbent	

=== Thirteenth cabinet ===
The thirteenth cabinet of the United Arab Emirates was formed on the 20 October 2017 and was headed by Sheikh Mohammed bin Rashid Al Maktoum.

Office	Office holder	Took office	Left office
Prime Minister; Minister of Defence	Sheikh Mohammed bin Rashid Al Maktoum	Incumbent	
Deputy Prime Minister; Minister of Presidential Affairs	Sheikh Mansour bin Zayed Al Nahyan	Incumbent	
Deputy Prime Minister; Minister of Interior	Sheikh Saif bin Zayed Al Nahyan	Incumbent	
Minister of Finance and Industry	Sheikh Hamdan bin Rashid Al Maktoum	Incumbent	
Minister of Foreign Affairs	Sheikh Abdullah bin Zayed Al Nahyan	Incumbent	
Minister of Justice	Sultan Saeed Al Badi	Incumbent	
Minister of Artificial Intelligence	Omar Al Olama	20 October 2017	
Minister of Cabinet Affairs and the Future	Mohammed Abdullah Al Gargawi	Incumbent	
Minister of Climate Change and Environment	Thani bin Ahmed Al Zeyoudi	Incumbent	
Minister of Community Development	Hessa Bint Essa Buhumaid	20 October 2017	
Minister of Culture and Youth	Noura Al Kaabi	20 October 2017	
Minister of Economy	Sultan bin Saeed Al Mansouri	Incumbent	
Minister of Education	Hussain Al Hammadi	Incumbent	
Minister of Energy	Suhail Al Mazroui	Incumbent	
Minister of Happiness	Mariam Mohammed Khalfan Al Roumi	Incumbent	
Minister of Health	Abdul Rahman Mohammed Al Owais	Incumbent	
Minister of State for Federal National Council Affairs	Abdul Rahman Mohammed Al Owais	20 October 2017	
Minister of Human Resources and Emiratization	Nasser bin Thani Al Hamli	20 October 2017	
Minister of Public Works	Abdullah Al Nuaimi	Incumbent	
Minister of Tolerance	Sheikh Nahyan bin Mubarak Al Nahyan	20 October 2017	
Minister of State for Advanced Science	Sarah Al Amiri	20 October 2017	
Minister of State for Defence Affairs	Mohammed Ahmed Al Bowardi	Incumbent	
Minister of State for Financial Affairs	Obaid Humaid Al Tayer	Incumbent	
Minister of State for Food Security	Mariam Almheiri	20 October 2017	
Minister of State for Foreign Affairs	Anwar Mohammed Gargash	Incumbent	
Minister of State for Higher Education	Ahmad Belhoul Al Falasi	Incumbent	
Minister of State for International Cooperation	Reem Al Hashimy	Incumbent	
Minister of State for Public Education	Jameela Salem Al Muhairi	Incumbent	
Minister of State for Youth Affairs	Shamma Al Mazrui	Incumbent	
Minister of State	Maitha Salem Al Shamsi	Incumbent	
Minister of State	Ahmed Ali Al Sayegh	19 September 2018	
Minister of State	Rashid Ahmad bin Fahad	Incumbent	
Minister of State	Sultan Al Jaber	Incumbent	5 July 2020
Minister of State	Zaki Nusseibeh	20 October 2017	

=== Fourteenth cabinet ===
The fourteenth cabinet of the United Arab Emirates was formed on the 5 July 2020 and was headed by Sheikh Mohammed bin Rashid Al Maktoum.

Office	Office holder	Took office	Left office
Prime Minister; Minister of Defence	Sheikh Mohammed bin Rashid Al Maktoum	Incumbent	
Deputy Prime Minister; Minister of Presidential Affairs	Sheikh Mansour bin Zayed Al Nahyan	Incumbent	
Deputy Prime Minister; Minister of Interior	Sheikh Saif bin Zayed Al Nahyan	Incumbent	
Minister of Finance	Sheikh Hamdan bin Rashid Al Maktoum	Incumbent	24 March 2021
Minister of Finance	Obaid Humaid Al Tayer (Acting)	24 March 2021	
Minister of Foreign Affairs and International Cooperation	Sheikh Abdullah bin Zayed Al Nahyan	Incumbent	
Minister of Justice	Sultan Saeed Al Badi	Incumbent	
Minister of Cabinet Affairs	Mohammed Abdullah Al Gargawi	Incumbent	
Minister of Climate Change and Environment	Abdullah Al Nuaimi	5 July 2020	
Minister of Community Development	Hessa bint Essa Buhumaid	Incumbent	
Minister of Culture and Youth	Noura Al Kaabi	Incumbent	
Minister of Economy	Abdulla bin Touq Al Marri	5 July 2020	
Minister of Education	Hussain Al Hammadi	Incumbent	
Minister of Energy and Infrastructure	Suhail Al Mazroui	Incumbent	
Minister of Health; Minister of State for Federal National Council Affairs	Abdul Rahman Mohammed Al Owais	Incumbent	
Minister of Human Resources and Emiratization	Nasser bin Thani Al Hamli	Incumbent	
Minister of Industry and Advanced Technology	Sultan Al Jaber	5 July 2020	
Minister of Tolerance and Coexistence	Sheikh Nahyan bin Mubarak Al Nahyan	Incumbent	
Minister of State for Advanced Technology	Sarah Al Amiri	5 July 2020	
Minister of State for Artificial Intelligence, Digital Economy and Remote Work	Omar Al Olama	Incumbent	
Minister of State for Defence Affairs	Mohammed Ahmed Al Bowardi	Incumbent	
Minister of State for Entrepreneurship and SMEs	Ahmad Belhoul Al Falasi	5 July 2020	
Minister of State for Financial Affairs	Obaid Humaid Al Tayer	Incumbent	
Minister of State for Food and Water Security	Mariam Almheiri	Incumbent	
Minister of State for Foreign Affairs	Anwar Mohammed Gargash	Incumbent	10 February 2021
Minister of State for Government Development and the Future	Ohoud Al Roumi	5 July 2020	
Minister of State for International Cooperation	Reem Al Hashimy	Incumbent	
Minister of State for International Trade	Thani bin Ahmed Al Zeyoudi	5 July 2020	
Minister of State for Public Education	Jameela Salem Al Muhairi	Incumbent	
Minister of State for Youth Affairs	Shamma Al Mazrui	Incumbent	
Minister of State	Ahmed Ali Al Sayegh	Incumbent	
Minister of State	Khalifa Shaheen Al Marar	10 February 2021	
Minister of State	Maitha Salem Al Shamsi	Incumbent	
Minister of State	Sheikh Shakhboot bin Nahyan Al Nahyan	10 February 2021	
Minister of State	Zaki Nusseibeh	Incumbent	10 February 2021

=== Fifteenth cabinet ===
The fifteenth cabinet of the United Arab Emirates was formed on the 25 September 2021 and was headed by Sheikh Mohammed bin Rashid Al Maktoum.

Office	Office holder	Took office	Left office
Prime Minister; Minister of Defence	Sheikh Mohammed bin Rashid Al Maktoum	Incumbent	
Deputy Prime Minister; Minister of Presidential Affairs	Sheikh Mansour bin Zayed Al Nahyan	Incumbent	
Deputy Prime Minister; Minister of Interior	Sheikh Saif bin Zayed Al Nahyan	Incumbent	
Deputy Prime Minister; Minister of Finance	Sheikh Maktoum bin Mohammed Al Maktoum	25 September 2021	
Minister of Foreign Affairs and International Cooperation	Sheikh Abdullah bin Zayed Al Nahyan	Incumbent	
Minister of Justice	Abdullah bin Sultan bin Awad Al Nuaimi	25 September 2021	
Minister of Cabinet Affairs and the Future	Mohammed Abdullah Al Gargawi	Incumbent	
Minister of Climate Change and Environment	Mariam Almheiri	25 September 2021	11 January 2024
Minister of Climate Change and Environment	Amna Al Dahak Al Shamsi	11 January 2024	
Minister of Community Development	Hessa bint Essa Buhumaid	Incumbent	7 February 2023
Minister of Community Development	Shamma Al Mazrui	7 February 2023	
Minister of Culture and Youth	Noura Al Kaabi	Incumbent	7 February 2023
Minister of Culture and Youth	Salem Al Qasimi	7 February 2023	
Minister of Economy	Abdulla bin Touq Al Marri	Incumbent	
Minister of Education	Hussain Al Hammadi	Incumbent	22 May 2022
Minister of Education	Ahmad Belhoul Al Falasi	22 May 2022	
Minister of Energy and Infrastructure	Suhail Al Mazroui	Incumbent	
Minister of Federal Supreme Council Affairs	Abdullah Muhair Al Ketbi	25 September 2021	
Minister of Health; Minister of State for Federal National Council Affairs	Abdul Rahman Mohammed Al Owais	Incumbent	
Minister of Human Resources and Emiratization	Abdulrahman Abdulmannan Al Awar	25 September 2021	
Minister of Industry and Advanced Technology	Sultan Al Jaber	Incumbent	
Minister of State for Advanced Technology	Sarah Al Amiri	Incumbent	
Minister of State for Artificial Intelligence, Digital Economy and Remote Work	Omar Al Olama	Incumbent	
Minister of State for Defence Affairs	Mohammed Ahmed Al Bowardi	Incumbent	11 January 2024
Minister of State for Defence Affairs	Mohammed Fadel Al Mazrouei	11 January 2024	
Minister of State for Entrepreneurship and SMEs	Ahmad Belhoul Al Falasi	Incumbent	22 May 2022
Minister of State for Financial Affairs	Mohammed bin Hadi Al Hussaini	25 September 2021	
Minister of State for Government Development and the Future	Ohoud Al Roumi	Incumbent	
Minister of State for International Cooperation	Reem Al Hashimy	Incumbent	
Minister of State for International Trade	Thani bin Ahmed Al Zeyoudi	Incumbent	
Minister of State for Public Education	Jameela Salem Al Muhairi	Incumbent	22 May 2022
Minister of State for Public Education	Sarah Al Amiri	22 May 2022	
Minister of State for Youth Affairs	Shamma Al Mazrui	Incumbent	7 February 2023
Minister of State for Youth Affairs	Sultan Al Neyadi	11 January 2024	
Minister of Tolerance and Coexistence	Sheikh Nahyan bin Mubarak Al Nahyan	Incumbent	
Minister of State	Ahmed Ali Al Sayegh	Incumbent	
Minister of State	Hessa bint Essa Buhumaid	7 February 2023	
Minister of State	Jabr Mohammed Ghanem Al Suwaidi	19 August 2022	
Minister of State	Khalifa Shaheen Al Marar	Incumbent	
Minister of State	Maitha Salem Al Shamsi	Incumbent	
Minister of State	Maryam Al Hammadi	7 February 2023	
Minister of State	Noura Al Kaabi	7 February 2023	
Minister of State	Sheikh Shakhboot bin Nahyan Al Nahyan	Incumbent	
