= Gulf News =

Dubai-based English-language newspaper

- Gulf News (cover of 22 May 2018)
- Type: Daily newspaper
- Format: Berliner
- Owner: Al Nisr Publishing
- Founded: 30 September 1978; 47 years ago
- Language: English
- Headquarters: Dubai, United Arab Emirates
- Country: United Arab Emirates
- Circulation: 108,187 (daily); 108,777 (weekend) (December 2012)
- OCLC number: 232115522
- Website: www.gulfnews.com

Gulf News is a daily English language newspaper published in Dubai, United Arab Emirates. It first launched in 1978. Its online edition was launched in 1996. Through its owner Al Nisr Publishing, it is a subsidiary of the Al Tayer Group which is chaired by former UAE Finance Minister Obaid Al Tayer.

== History and profile ==
Gulf News was first launched in tabloid format on 30 September 1978, but struggled in its early years. In November 1984, three UAE businessmen purchased the company and formed Al Nisr Publishing. The new owners of the paper were Obaid Humaid Al Tayer, Abdullah Al Rostamani and Juma Al Majid. With the death of Abdullah Al Rostamani in 2006, his position on the board is held by a family nominee while the other directors remain.

Under new ownership, Gulf News was relaunched on 10 December 1985 and was free to the public. From February 1986, the public was charged one dirham (US 27 cents) a copy for the Gulf News package which comprised the broadsheet newspaper and a leisure supplement called Tabloid, which also contained classifieds.

After moving into new premises in 1986, Gulf News began to be distributed to other GCC countries: Bahrain from September 1987; Oman from April 1989; Saudi Arabia from March 1989; and Qatar from April 1989. It also became available in Pakistan from August 1988. In order to provide better local coverage for its readers, Gulf News opened various bureaus: the Abu Dhabi bureau was opened in 1982; Bahrain bureau in January 1988; Oman bureau in 1989; Manila bureau in August 1990; Al Ain bureau in 1994; Sharjah bureau in May 1995; and the New Delhi bureau in November 1995.

In November 1995, the width of the paper's broadsheet pages was reduced by four centimetres, to create the new international size of 38 centimetres. Al Nisr Publishing became a limited liability company (LLC) with a share capital of Dh15 million on 26 May 1997.

The first online edition of Gulf News was launched on 1 September 1996. The daily launched video news in its online edition in the second part of the 2000s, being among the first in the region. It was relaunched in 2025, becoming the first dynamic news website in the UAE.

From 2008 to December 2024, Abdul Hamid Ahmad was the editor-in-chief of the paper. Mark Thompson was appointed editor in chief in September 2025. Vijay Vaghela is CEO. Regular op-ed contributors to Gulf News include: Uri Avnery, Kuldip Nayar, Faisal Alkasim, Joseph A. Kechichian, Sami Moubayed, Marwan Al Kabalan, Rakesh Mani, Linda S. Heard, Stuart Reigeluth and Wael Al Sayegh. Gulf News moved to its present headquarters on Sheikh Zayed Road in April 2000.

Gulf News changed its format to Berliner on 1 June 2012, being the first Berliner-format daily published in the Arab countries. On 2 June 2023, Gulf News in an editorial published on its front page, informed its readers that it will stop its print edition on weekends, starting from 3 June 2023. Then editor-in-chief Abdul Hamid Ahmad said that rising costs of paper, ink, logistics and declining advertisement revenue have contributed to this decision.

== Gulfnews.com ==
Gulf News launched its first online edition in 1996, initially serving as an archive for its print publication and managed by library staff. However, it was the website’s major relaunch in 2005 and the introduction of a dedicated team of online journalists that marked a turning point in its digital evolution. With this transformation, gulfnews.com became the first dynamic news platform in the UAE to offer real-time news updates, breaking news coverage, and online exclusives, establishing itself as a standalone digital news source.

In 2010, gulfnews.com was reported by Forbes Middle East to be the most-read English-language online newspaper in both the UAE and the wider Middle East and North Africa (MENA) region . The publication also ranked seventh among all online newspapers in the same survey. In a separate Forbes Middle East report covering the period from 31 August 2011 to 31 August 2012, it was listed as the third most-read online newspaper in the Arab world in the period from 31 August 2011 to 31 August 2012. Gulf News received recognition for its digital and print innovations at the 2016 WAN-Ifra Asian Media Awards, winning multiple honors in editorial and design categories.

Web Editor Florence Pia Yu, who started writing for Gulf News in 2001 before becoming part of the pioneering online editorial team from 2005 to 2018, became the first online journalist to win Dubai's DSF Journalism Awards twice. Her articles promoting Dubai’s lifestyle and cultural scene earned her back-to-back wins at the Dubai Shopping Festival (DSF) Journalism and Photography Awards in 2012 and 2013. The awards were presented by Sheikh Majid Bin Mohammed Bin Rashid Al Maktoum, then Chairman of the Dubai Culture and Arts Authority.

== Controversy ==
In January 2009, Gulf News ran a column by Mohammad Abdullah Al Mutawa that claimed the Holocaust was a lie.

Today, the whole world stands as a witness to the fact that the Nazi holocaust was a mere lie, which was devised by the Zionists to blackmail humanity. The same Zionist entity swindled the world out of billions of dollars over the years to compensate the wrong and unjust which they claim to have been inflicted on their people. It is evident that the holocaust was a conspiracy hatched by the Zionists and Nazis, and many innocent people gave their lives as a result of this inhuman plot.

The article has since been removed from Gulf News' website.

On 15 December 2013, Gulf News in its editorial claimed without mentioning any source that Pakistan and Afghanistan did not vote for Dubai in its bid for Expo 2020. The Foreign Office of Pakistan quickly brushed aside the allegations as baseless mentioning the facts that Pakistan was committed to bid for Turkey Izmir since Turkey approached Pakistan for its support in 2011 long before Dubai even expressed its interest to host Expo 2020. Javed Jalil Khattak, Consulate General of Pakistan in Dubai, in an open letter to Gulf News termed the editorial as "an orchestrated attempt to damage and defame the historic fraternal relations between Pakistan and the UAE", while the editorial drew an angry reaction from the Pakistani expat community in the UAE.

On 10 July 2017, Francis Matthew, former Editor and then Editor-at-Large at Gulf News, was charged with the murder of his wife allegedly with a hammer blow to her head, over finances. According to the charge, he killed her in the early morning of 4 July 2017, then went to work and held meetings as normal, after which he then returned in the evening to their villa and reported to police that thieves had broken in and assaulted her. After questioning he admitted he killed her, claiming she harangued him when a huge argument erupted over finances and debts totalling some 1 million dirhams (£200,000). Subsequently, controversy surrounding his sentencing and re-sentencing has led to media reports. In October 2018, his sentence was increased from 10 years to 15 years, with pleas from Jane Matthew's family to change the charge from physical assault to premeditated murder. But then, due to the death of Jane's father, his lawyers were allowed to appeal again, as UAE newspaper The National reported: "Jane's only surviving legal heir, her son, had previously signed a waiver dropping criminal charges against his father. This meant all private charges against him had been dropped but that public law – the right of government law against an accused – was still applicable. In UAE law, if the legal successors of a victim drop charges and waive their private rights, the court is still obliged to impose a penalty against the accused under public law – but it will be a shorter term.". While the minimum sentence for murder in the UAE is 10 years, Matthew's defence expects a reduction to two years based on public law. The case is ongoing.
