= List of ambassadors of the United Arab Emirates to the Netherlands =

Ambassador of United Arab Emirates to the Kingdom of the Netherlands
- Coat of Arms of the UAE
- Incumbent; Jamal Jama Al Musharakh since March 30, 2022
- Ministry of Foreign Affairs
- Style: His Excellency
- Inaugural holder: Ali Thani Al Suwaidi
- Formation: 2003

The Emirati ambassador in The Hague is the official representative of the Government in Abu Dhabi to the Government of the Kingdom of the Netherlands.

Relations between both countries were established in 1972, with the Netherlands accrediting its first non-resident ambassador that year. Non-resident ambassadors of the UAE were accredited to the Netherlands from 1973 until 2002, as the embassy in The Hague was opened on September 10.

== List of representatives ==
Diplomatic accreditation	Ambassador	Observations	Emirati president	Monarch of the Netherlands	Term end
2003	Ali Thani Al Suwaidi	First resident ambassador to the Netherlands. He presented his credentials in November 2003.	Khalifa bin Zayed Al Nahyan	Beatrix	2012
2012	Abdallah Hamdan Al Naqbi	Second resident ambassador.	Khalifa bin Zayed Al Nahyan	Beatrix	2021
2022	Jamal Jama Al Musharakh	Third resident ambassador. He presented his credentials on March 30, 2022.	Khalifa bin Zayed Al Nahyan	Willem-Alexander	Incumbent

== See also ==
- Foreign relations of the Netherlands
- Foreign relations of the United Arab Emirates
