= List of ambassadors of the United Arab Emirates to Japan =

Ambassador of United Arab Emirates to Japan
- Coat of Arms of the UAE
- Incumbent; Shihab Ahmed Al-Faheem since 2021
- Ministry of Foreign Affairs
- Style: His Excellency
- Inaugural holder: Rashid Abdul Aziz Al-Makhawi
- Formation: 1973

The Emirati ambassador in Tokyo is the official representative of the Government in Abu Dhabi to the Government of Japan. Relations were established on May 4, 1972.

== List of representatives ==
Diplomatic accreditation	Ambassador	Observations	Emirati president	Emperor of Japan	Term end
1973	Rashid Abdul Aziz Al-Makhawi	First ambassador of the UAE to Japan.	Zayed bin Sultan Al Nahyan	Hirohito	1974
1974	Ebrahim Hasan Saif		Zayed bin Sultan Al Nahyan	Hirohito	1974
1974	Ahmed Salim Al-Mokarrab		Zayed bin Sultan Al Nahyan	Hirohito	1985
1985	Mohamed Darweesh Benkaram		Zayed bin Sultan Al Nahyan	Hirohito	1988
1988	Hamad Salem Al–Makami		Zayed bin Sultan Al Nahyan	Hirohito	2000
2000	Ahmed Ali Hamad Al-Mualla		Zayed bin Sultan Al Nahyan	Akihito	2005
2005	Saeed Ali Yousef Al-Nowais		Khalifa bin Zayed Al Nahyan	Akihito	2016
2016	Khaled Omran Sqait Sarhan Al-Ameri		Khalifa bin Zayed Al Nahyan	Akihito	2021
2021	Shihab Ahmed Al-Faheem		Khalifa bin Zayed Al Nahyan	Naruhito	Incumbent

== See also ==
- Foreign relations of Japan
- Foreign relations of the United Arab Emirates
