= Al Rabban Holding Company =

Al Rabban Holding
- Native name: الربان القابضة
- Company type: Private
- Founded: 1964
- Headquarters: Doha, Qatar
- Key people: Nasser Al Rabban (Chairman)
- Website: www.alrabbanholding.com

Al Rabban Holding Company is a Qatari holding company, that is, a company that owns enough voting stock in other companies to control their corporate policies and management. This company features a diversified portfolio of companies and partnerships.

Al Rabban Holding Company is responsible for much of the growth of the Qatari economy, generating over 80% of non-oil GDP in the GCC.

== Overview ==
Al Rabban Holding Company is a family-run holding company that was founded in 1964 when Khalid bin Mohammed al-Rabban took over the Rabban Contracting and Trading Co. (WLL) and initiated a growth strategy that carefully selects strategic partnerships with international industry leaders to add value and diversify the holding and advance Qatari growth. Khalid Al Rabban joined Qatar Holding as part of the General Portfolio Team, specializing in the retail and luxury industries after a long career in various ministries, financial institutions, investment firms, developers, banks and portfolio managers. The companies managed by Al Rabban Holding include Rabban Readymix Company, Rayyan Mineral Water Company, Al Sarh Real Estate, Rabban Services Company, Rabban Contracting and Trading Company, Arabian Falcon Transport Company, Rabban Stefanutti Stocks, Rabban Hospitality, and Al Tayer Stocks. The holding company has interests in contracting, cement, general sponsorship and trading. The group's financial advisor is the local Islamic Bank, Masraf Al Rayan.

== Leadership ==
The founder, chairman, and managing director of the Al Rabban Holding Company is Khalid bin Mohammed al-Rabban.

In 1961, Al Rabban was arrested during his tenure as an initial donor and board member of the Talia Club in Qatar. This controversial cultural club put forth provocative political content, and acted as a political party in Qatar, but was disbanded after its headquarters were raided and its members arrested.

He was also the President and board member of a Swiss-based charity organization called Alkarama foundation.

Al Rabban is a member of the Global Anti-Aggression Campaign led by Safar bin Abdul Rahman al-Hawali.

== Current standing ==
In the latest news, Al Rayyan Mineral Water Company (LLC) previously with 100% ownership by Al Rabban Holding Company, went from a limited liability corporation to a publish shareholding company in 2016. In 2014, Rabban Hospitality signed an agreement with Frasers Hospitality regarding the development and operations management of Frasers Suites, a 46-story tower in West Bay Doha.

== Companies ==
- Rayyan Water Company
- Polytech Plastic Industries
- Rayyan Drinks Company
- Al Sarh Real Estate Company
- Al Rabban Tower
- Voco Doha West Bay Suites
- Rabban Readymix Company
- Rabban Contracting & Trading Company
- Rabban Services Company
- Al Rabban Hospitality
- Al Rabban Falcon Transport
- Al Rabban Agriculture Company
- Al Rabban Capital Trading & Contracting
