= Lattafa =

Emirati perfume company

- Type: Private
- Industry: Perfume
- Founder: Shahid Ahmed
- Headquarters: Sharjah, United Arab Emirates
- Area served: Worldwide
- Products: Perfumes
- Website: lattafa.com

Lattafa is a perfume company in the United Arab Emirates. Founded in the 1980s and family-owned, it sells Arabian-style fragrances at low prices. In the 2020s it became one of several Middle Eastern brands to gain sales in Europe and North America, growth that press coverage attributed largely to TikTok.

== History ==
Sources differ on the company's origins. Luxus Magazine gives a founding date of 1980 in Dubai; the founder, Shahid Ahmed, told Gulf News that the business had been trading for more than three decades and was based in Sharjah. Ahmed said he had worked in a relative's perfume shop in Dubai for thirteen years before starting the company.

The name derives from the Arabic latif ("gentle"). The company is owned and managed by Ahmed's family, with Shoaib Iqbal Ahmed responsible for research and development.

== Products ==
Lattafa's range consists mainly of eau de parfum compositions, frequently using oud, sold at prices below those of established designer and niche perfumers. Its titles include Khamrah, Yara and Asad. Ahmed told Gulf News that much of the range sold at about 180 dirhams.

The company reported distribution in more than 60 countries and sales through about 2,000 traders.
