= Thani bin Ahmed Al Zeyoudi =

Minister of United Arab Emirates government

His Excellency Dr. Thani bin Ahmed Al Zeyoudi
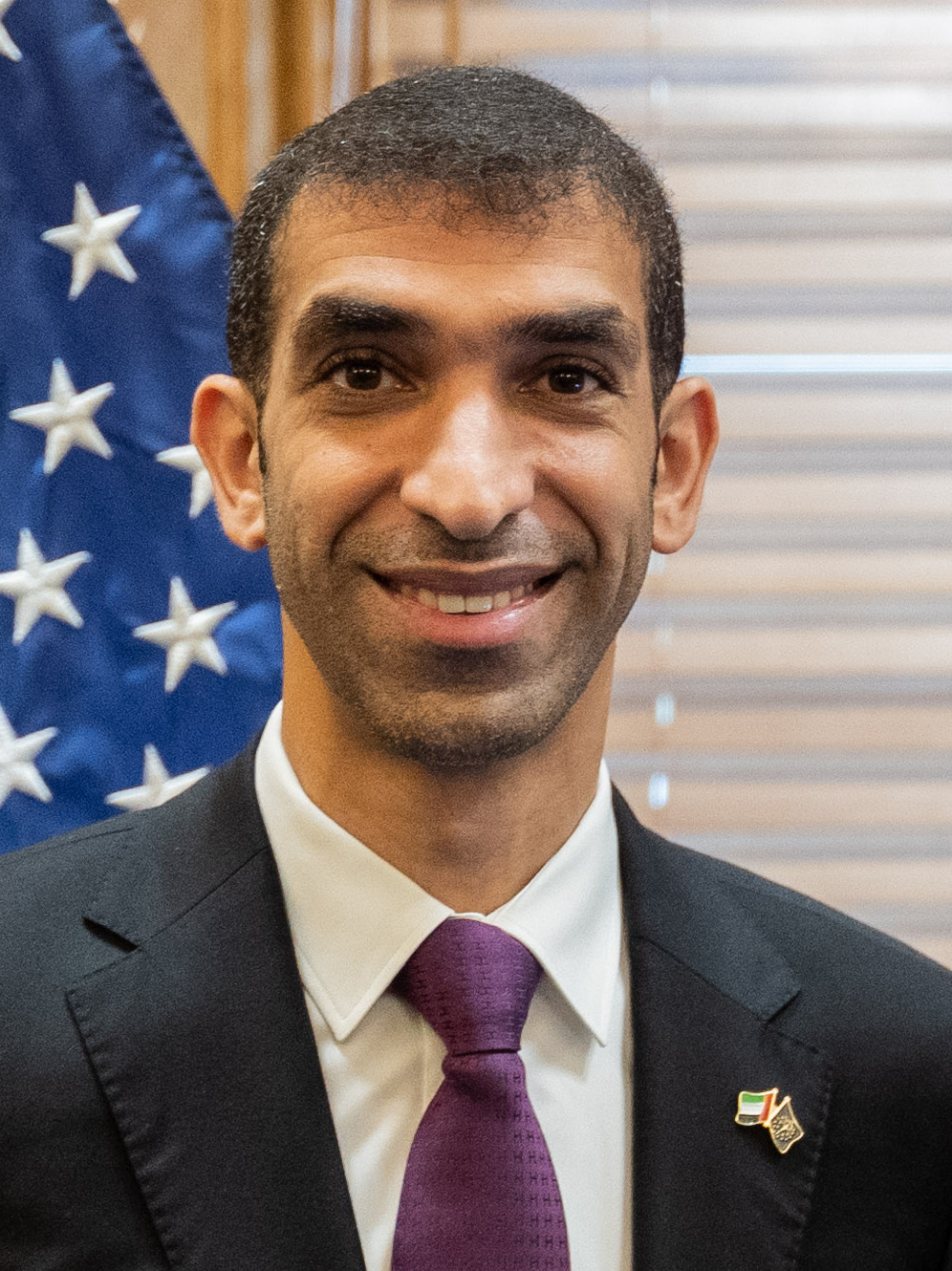

Minister of State for Foreign Trade
- Incumbent
- Assumed office July 2020
- President: Khalifa bin Zayed Al Nahyan
- Prime Minister: Mohammed bin Rashid Al Maktoum

Minister of Climate Change and Environment
- In office February 2016 – 5 July 2020
- President: Khalifa bin Zayed Al Nahyan
- Prime Minister: Mohammed bin Rashid Al Maktoum
- Preceded by: Rashid Ahmad bin Fahad
- Succeeded by: Abdullah Al Nuaimi

Thani bin Ahmed Al Zeyoudi is the present Minister of Foreign Trade of the United Arab Emirates. He has a DBA in Project and Programme Management from Skema Business School, a master's degree in Project Management from the British University in Dubai, a master's degree in Business Administration from New York Institute of Technology and a bachelor's degree in Petroleum Engineering from the University of Tulsa. He was the Minister of Climate Change and Environment from February 2016 to July 2020.
