= Jameela Salem Al Muhairi =

Jameela Salem Al Muhairi is a politician and Government Minister in the United Arab Emirates. She is the Minister of State for Public Education. The ministry under her has created a plan to overhaul schools in the United Arab Emirates and use Cambridge International Examinations syllabus in English version schools.

== Biography ==
Jameela graduated from the United Arab Emirates University, where she studied Management. She worked at the Ministry of Education from 1995 to 2004. From 2004 to 2007, she was the Executive Director of Dubai Knowledge Village. Muhairi has been working as the Chief of Dubai Schools Inspections Bureau at KHDA since 2006. She was the Chief of Dubai School Inspection Bureau at Knowledge and Human Development Authority. She has also been the Chairman of the Emirates School Establishment since 2019. She was made the State Minister of Public Education of the United Arab Emirates in February 2016. She sits on the board of the charity Dubai Cares Foundation. She was a panelist on the Equity in Education: Delivering on SDG4 hosted in Abu Dhabi, United Arab Emirates. She founded the school targets initiative that aims to monitor schools and reward outstanding results from them. She described education as fundamental element needed for the development of United Arab Emirates and an investment in the country's youth, as she outlined the UAE Vision 2021 National Agenda.

Muhairi introduced the Teacher and Educational Leadership Standards (TELS) into learning modules in school departments. The TELS added pre-service preparation and training for newly graduating teachers.
