= Najla Mohammad Al Awar =

Emirati politician

Minister of Community Development
- Preceded by: Maryam Mohammed Khalfan Al Roumi
- Succeeded by: Hessa bint Essa Buhumaid

Secretary General of the Cabinet of the United Arab Emirates
- In office March 2006 – February 2016

Personal details
- Education: United Arab Emirates University; London Business School
- Occupation: Politician, civil servant

Najla Mohammad Al Awar is the Minister of Community Development in the United Arab Emirates. She is one of eight women in the cabinet of United Arab Emirates, the highest number of women cabinet members in the Arab world. She is also the Secretary General of the Ministry of Cabinet Affairs and The Future.

== Biography ==
Najla completed her bachelor's degree in Information Technology at the United Arab Emirates University. She studied Management Administration at the London Business School. She helped develop the Legal Affairs Office at the General-Secretariat of the Cabinet. She helped found the Executive Office of Sheikh Mohammed bin Rashid Al Maktoum and worked to establish the Secretariat of the Dubai Executive Council. From March 2006 to February 2016, she was the Secretary General of the Ministry of Cabinet Affairs. In 2011, she served in the boards of General Pension, Social Security Authority, and the National Election Committee. In 2014, she worked in the Higher Committee for the National Curricula and Educational Tools. In February 2016, she was made the Minister of Community Development. As a minister she has helped establish the "i'dad" (preparation) program. She also serves in the boards of Dubai Women Foundation and Dubai Women Establishment. In the Forbes Middle East list of 200 most powerful Arab women, she was placed 32. She formed a council to implement the National Policy to Empower People of Determination of the United Arab Emirates government.
