= Suhail Al Mazroui =

Emirati businessman and politician

His Excellency Suhail Al Mazroui
- سهيل محمد فرج المزروعي
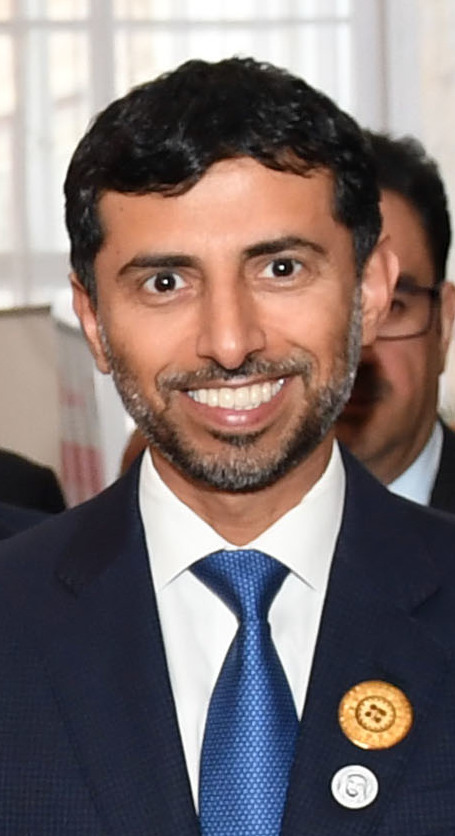
- Al Mazroui in 2018

Minister of Energy & Infrastructure (Note: Suhail Al Mazroui was the Minister of Energy from 2013 to 2020, when it was merged with the Ministry of Infrastructure Development.)
- In office 12 March 2013 – 4 July 2020
- Prime Minister: Mohammed bin Rashid Al Maktoum
- Preceded by: Mohammed bin Dhaen Al Hamli; Abdullah Al Nuaimi

Personal details
- Born: 3 July 1973 (age 53) Dubai, United Arab Emirates
- Citizenship: UAE
- Education: University of Tulsa

Suhail Mohammed Faraj Al Mazroui (Arabic: سهيل محمد فرج المزروعي; born 3 July 1973) is an Emirati businessman and politician, who has been serving as the minister of energy in the United Arab Emirates since March 2013.

== Early life ==
Al Mazroui was born on the 3rd of July 1973 in Dubai, United Arab Emirates.

Mazroui graduated with a petroleum engineering degree from the University of Tulsa in 1996.

== Career ==
Al Mazroui worked at the Abu Dhabi National Oil Company (ADNOC) for 10 years. He was CEO of ADNOC until 2007. He was the Director at Dolphin Energy, vice-chairman of Sorouh Real Estate from 2009 to 2013, and deputy CEO of state-owned Mubadala Oil and Gas. He was with Mubadala until 2013 when he was appointed Energy Minister.

In April 2015, he was appointed to the position of managing director of IPIC. He was the chairman of the board of directors for CEPSA (2015-2018), the Spanish multinational oil and gas company, where Mubadala Investment Company is the largest shareholder. In December 2017, he was elected as president of OPEC, for one year (January–December 2018).

=== Cabinet positions ===
In a cabinet reshuffle in March 2013, he was appointed minister of energy under Prime Minister Mohammed bin Rashid Al Maktoum, replacing Mohammed bin Dhaen Al Hamli in the post. In October 2017, industry was added to his portfolio, where he became minister of energy and industry. He became the head of the Federal Electricity and Water Authority (FEWA).

He is a member of the advisory committee of Abu Dhabi's Supreme Petroleum Council, vice-chairman of the Emirates Nuclear Energy Corporation, and vice chairman on the Supreme Committee for Abu Dhabi's Water & Electricity.

In July 2020, Sheikh Mohammed bin Rashid Al Maktoum, the ruler of Dubai and prime minister of the UAE, announced a government restructuring and Cabinet reshuffle. As part of the restructuring, the Ministry of Energy & Industry was merged with the Ministry of Infrastructure Development, and Al Mazroui became the minister of energy and infrastructure, overseeing the combined ministry. The Zayed Housing Program and Federal Authority Land and Maritime Transport were also placed under the new combined ministry.

== Other positions ==
Al Mazroui has been with Mubadala since 2007 and is chairman of Mubadala Petroleum LLC. He is also a member of the Executive Committee and Audit, Risk and Compliance Committee of the Board of Mubadala Investment Company. Al Mazroui was deputy CEO and vice president of new business development of Mubadala Oil & Gas from 2007 to 2013.

Al Mazroui is the chairman of Emirates Liquified Gas Company, a private company, owned by Mubadala. As of 2015, he was chairman of the Borealis Supervisory Board.

He was chairman of NOVA Chemicals Corporation (a plastic and chemical company that is a subsidiary of Mubadala) for nearly five years, stepping down from this position in 2020. He is the vice-chairman at Nawah Energy Company.

Suhail was appointed as the chairman of the board of directors for Emirates General Petroleum (Emarat), a fuel retailer, in August 2020.

Suhail is the Chairman of the Etihad-Oman Joint Venture, a joint venture exploring a rail connection between UAE and Oman.

== Personal life ==
Suhail Al Mazroui is married and lives in Abu Dhabi with his wife and five children. His uncle is Suhail Faris Ghanem Ateish Al Mazrouei, the chairman of Dubai Investments Directors, member of the Supreme Petroleum Council of Abu Dhabi, who is the father of the minister of community development, Shamma Al Mazrui.
