= Khalifa Shaheen Al Marar =

Diplomat of the United Arab Emirates

Khalifa Shaheen Al Marar is an Emirati diplomat who served as UAE ambassador to four different nations As of January 2022, he is a Minister of State within the UAE Ministry of Foreign Affairs and International Cooperation (MOFAIC).

== Education ==
Al Marar holds a master's degree in Political Economics from the New School for Social Research (NSSR) in New York, USA, and holds a bachelor's degree in Economy & Business Administration from Sophia University in Japan.

== Career in Foreign Service ==
=== Early career roles ===
Al Marar began his career as a diplomat working at the UAE in Tokyo from 1978 to 1982. He then moved to New York where worked at the UAE's Permanent Mission to the United Nations. From 1986 to 1990 Al Marar was Deputy Director of the Arab World Department at the Ministry of Foreign Affairs in Abu Dhabi.

=== Senior diplomatic appointments ===
From 1990 to 1995 Al Marar was appointed Ambassador Extraordinary and Plenipotentiary of the UAE to the Syrian Arab Republic based in Damascus.

His posting ended in 1995 and returned to Abu Dhabi where served as Director of the Gulf Cooperation Council (GCC) Affairs Department at the Ministry of Foreign Affairs.

In 1999 Al Marar became Ambassador Extraordinary and Plenipotentiary of the UAE to the Islamic Republic of Iran and Non-Resident Ambassador to Armenia. His appointment to these posts concluded in 2009.

From 2009 to 2016, he was Director of the Department of International Organisations at the Ministry of Foreign Affairs.

His fourth Ambassadorial role was as the UAE's representative in the Republic of Turkey from 2016 to 2018.

He then served as Assistant Minister for Political Affairs at MOFAIC before being appointed Minister of State on 9 February 2021.
