= Ahmed Ali Al Sayegh =

Minister Of State in the United Arab Emirates

Ministry of Health and Prevention (United Arab Emirates) (MOHAP)
- Incumbent
- Assumed office 1 September 2025
- President: Mohammed Bin Zayed Al Nahyan; Khalifa Bin Zayed Al Nahyan
- Prime Minister: Mohammed bin Rashid Al Maktoum

Personal details
- Born: 1962 (age 63–64) Abu Dhabi, United Arab Emirates
- Education: Lewis & Clark College (BA)
- Awards: London Institute of Banking and Finance Honorary Masters Degree Award

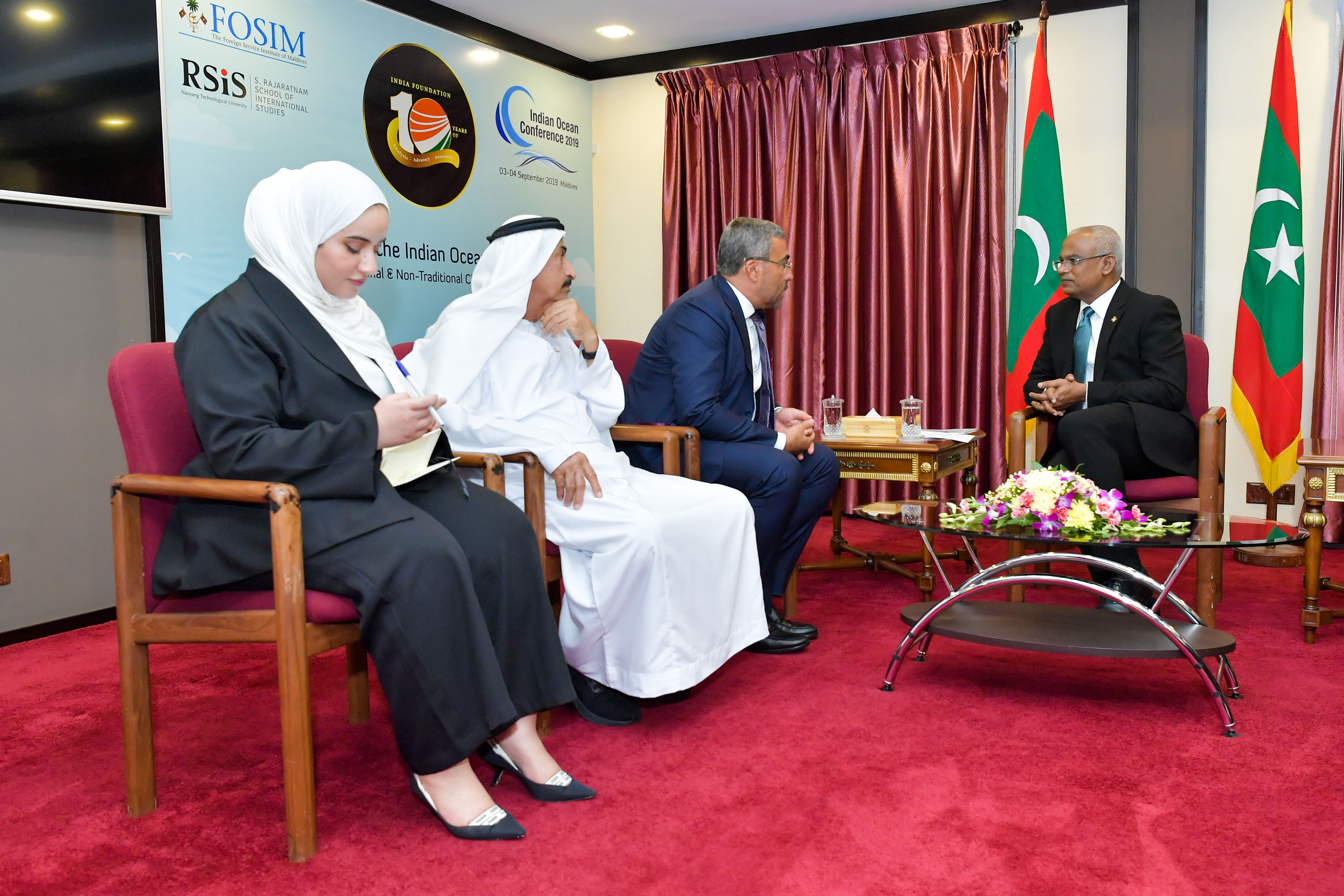
Ahmed Ali Al Sayegh, Minister for Economic Cooperation in the Ministry of Foreign Affairs of United Arab Emirates, making a courtesy call to the president

Ahmed Ali Al Sayegh (Arabic: أحمد علي الصايغ; born 1962) is an Emirati politician who is the Minister of Health in the United Arab Emirates since September 1, 2025.

== Early life and education ==
Al Sayegh was born in 1962 in Abu Dhabi where he attended school and furthered his higher education in the United States. He graduated in 1983 with a bachelor's degree in economics from Lewis & Clark College, Oregon, United States.

== Career ==
Al Sayegh co-chaired, with Lord Udny-Lister, the UAE-UK Business Council, during 2020–2026.

In September 2018, the UAE President Sheikh Khalifa bin Zayed Alnahyan, appointed Al Sayegh as the minister of state in the UAE Cabinet.

He was chairman of ADGM, which oversees the UAE capital city's International Financial Centre (IFC). He is the managing director of Dolphin Energy, a state-owned natural gas company. The company produces and processes natural gas from Qatar's North Field and transports the gas by sub-sea pipeline to the UAE from which it is delivered in the UAE and Oman.

He is founding board member of Etihad Airways and currently serves as a board member. He played an instrumental role in the launch of the UAE's national airline in 2003 and its subsequent growth.

He was the founding chairman of Aldar Properties when it launched in 2004 and remained in the role until April 2011.

He was founding chairman of Masdar, a renewable energy company based in Abu Dhabi.

He began his career at Abu Dhabi National Oil Company (ADNOC), where he moved through the ranks, prior to joining Dolphin Energy.

He has been on a number boards including chairman of Abu Dhabi Global Market; deputy chairman of the Emirates Nature-WWF; board member of Etihad Aviation Group; and as a board member of Abu Dhabi Development Fund. He is a member of the board of directors of Al Jazira Investment Company. Former board positions include deputy chairman of First Gulf Bank; founding chairman of Aldar Properties; founding board member of Mubadala Development Company; founding chairman of Abu Dhabi Future Energy Company (Masdar); founding board member and managing director of Emirates Foundation; founding board member of Abu Dhabi Water & Electricity Authority; founding board member of Abu Dhabi Ship Building Company; board member of Abu Dhabi National Insurance Company; board member of Tawazun (formerly UAE Offsets Group); board member of Abu Dhabi Tourism Authority; board member of Abu Dhabi Education Council; and board member of Abu Dhabi Media.

== Honours and awards ==
- ABANA 2017 Achievement Award
- London Institute of Banking & Finance (LIBF), Honorary master's degree Award
