= Hussain Al Hammadi =

Emirati politician and diplomat (born 1966)

UAE Ambassador to China
- Incumbent
- Assumed office 1 March 2023
- President: Mohammed bin Zayed Al Nahyan
- Preceded by: Ali Obaid AI Dhaheri

Minister of Education
- In office 20 October 2017 – 22 May 2022
- President: Khalifa bin Zayed Al Nahyan; Mohammed bin Zayed Al Nahyan
- Prime Minister: Mohammed bin Rashid Al Makhtoum
- Preceded by: Humaid Al Qattami
- Succeeded by: Ahmad Belhoul Al Falasi

Personal details
- Born: 1966 (age 59–60)
- Education: Embry-Riddle Aeronautical University

Hussain bin Ibrahim Al Hammadi (Arabic: حسين بن إبراهيم الحمادي; born 1966) is an Emirati politician and diplomat who is serves as the UAE ambassador to China since 1 March 2023, and served as the minister of education of the UAE between 4 July 2014 and 22 May 2022.

== Education ==
In 1989, he graduated with a Bachelor's in Aeronautical Engineering from Embry-Riddle Aeronautical University.

== Career ==
After completing high-school Al Hammadi joined the UAE Armed Forces in 1984.

In 2006, he was appointed as chairman and chief executive officer of Emirates Advanced Investments (EAI). He chaired the National Institute for Health Specialties and headed the Higher Education and Scientific Research Coordination Council.

He joined the UAE Cabinet in 2014 as minister of education, and in 2016, the Ministry of Higher Education was incorporated into the Ministry of Education. During the COVID-19 pandemic, he oversaw the implementation of remote learning and hybrid learning in UAE public schools.

He is the chairman of the National Committee for Education, Culture and Science, chairman of the Boards of Trustees of the Institute of Applied Technology (IAT), the Abu Dhabi Institute of Vocational Education and Training (ADVETI), and the Hamdan Award for Distinguished Academic Performance. Al Hammadi is also the chairman of the Board of Directors of the Federal Authority for Government Human Resources (FAHR), and a member of the Boards of Directors of Khalifa University and the Khalifa Award for Education.

== See also ==
- Cabinet of the United Arab Emirates
- List of Emiratis
