= Hessa Bint Essa Buhumaid =

Hessa bint Essa Buhumaid (born 1980) is an Emirati politician. She served as a Cabinet Member and the Minister of Community Development for the United Arab Emirates. Appointed to the position on October 19, 2017, she was tasked with improving and enhancing social development across all segments of the community.

In March 2023, Buhumaid was appointed as the Director General of the Community Development Authority (CDA) in Dubai.
