= Ministry of Climate Change and Environment =

Government ministry of the United Arab Emirates

- وزارة التغير المناخي و البيئة
- Logo of the UAE Ministry of Climate Change and Environment

Ministry overview
- Formed: 9 February 2006; 19 years ago
- Preceding Ministry: Federal Environment Agency
- Jurisdiction: Federal government of the United Arab Emirates
- Headquarters: Dubai, United Arab Emirates
- Minister responsible: Mariam Almheiri, Minister of Climate Change and Environment
- Website: moccae.gov.ae

The Ministry of Climate Change and Environment (Arabic: وزارة التغير المناخي و البيئة) is a federal government ministry in the United Arab Emirates that is responsible for regulating environmental protection and preservation in the country.

== History ==
The ministry was formed on 09 February 2006, in the first cabinet formed by Sheikh Mohammed bin Rashid Al Maktoum following the death of his brother, Sheikh Maktoum bin Rashid Al Maktoum.

== See also ==
- National Center for Meteorology (United Arab Emirates)
- Wildlife of the United Arab Emirates
- Flora and fauna of the United Arab Emirates
