= Ahmed bin Hamed al Hamed =

Emirati royal and politician

His Excellency Sheikh Sheikh Ahmed bin Hamed Bin Butti Al Hamed

Personal Advisor to the head of state
- Emir: Zayed bin Sultan Al Nahyan Khalifa bin Zayed Al Nahyan

Personal details
- Born: Ahmed bin Hamed bin Butti bin Khadem bin Nehayman Al Qubaisi; 1929 Abu Dhabi, Trucial States
- Died: 28 November 2012 (aged 82–83) Abu Dhabi, United Arab Emirates
- Spouse: Sherina bint Khalifa Al Suwaidi
- Father: Hamed bin Butti bin Khadem Bin Nehayman Al Qubaisi
- Mother: Sheikha Shamsa Al Suwaidi

Sheikh Ahmed Bin Hamed Al Hamed (1929–2012) was an Emirati royal and politician who served as first minister of information and tourism of the United Arab Emirates and was member of the Abu Dhabi royal family.

== Personal life ==
Sheikh Ahmed was born in 1929 in Abu Dhabi. He is maternal cousin to the country's founding president, Sheikh Zayed, and uncle to the president, Sheikh Khalifa.

== Contributions ==
Before the union of UAE, Sheikh Ahmed bin Hamed al Hamed was the head of Abu Dhabi labor department. He also headed the department of employers and employee and tourism affairs in Abu Dhabi.

Sheikh Ahmed bin Hamed al Hamed was the UAE's first Minister of Information and Tourism. Sheikh Ahmed was a member of the First Cabinet of Ministers which was created right after the union. Sheikh Ahmed is credited to be the pioneer of the media industry in UAE. During Abu Dhabi's oil boom of the 1960s and 1970s, he was the man behind the management of the Government media.

Under Sheikh Ahmed's guidance, The National's Arabic-language sister paper, Al Ittihad, was launched in 1969. He was also responsible for the launch of Abu Dhabi television. He also established Abu Dhabi's first radio station and organised archaeological expeditions which found several artifacts now in Emirate's museums.

He remained in his position as Minister of Information and Tourism, and later became Minister of Information and Culture, throughout the second, third and fourth Cabinets that were formed in the 1970s. He is respected for preserving the culture, national and Islamic heritage at the time of change.

== Death ==
He died on November 28, 2012 in Abu Dhabi at the age of 83 and his body was buried at the Al Bateen Cemetery in Abu Dhabi after a long mourning. His body was kept at Sheikh Sultan bin Zayed Al Nahyan's Mosque for the funeral which was attended by UAE Vice President, Prime Minister and Ruler of Dubai His Highness Mohammed bin Rashid Al Maktoum. Also paying their respects were Sheikh Nahyan bin Mubarak, Minister of Higher Education and Scientific Research, and Sheikh Hamdan bin Mubarak, Minister of Public Works. Joining the prayers were Shaikh Tahnoun Bin Mohammad Al Nahyan, Ruler's Representative in the Eastern Region, Shaikh Mansour Bin Zayed Al Nahyan, Deputy Prime Minister and Minister of Presidential Affairs, Lieutenant General Shaikh Saif Bin Zayed Al Nahyan, Deputy Prime Minister and Minister of Interior. His body was buried in Al Bateen Cemetery in Abu Dhabi.
