= Mohammed Khalfan Bin Kharbash =

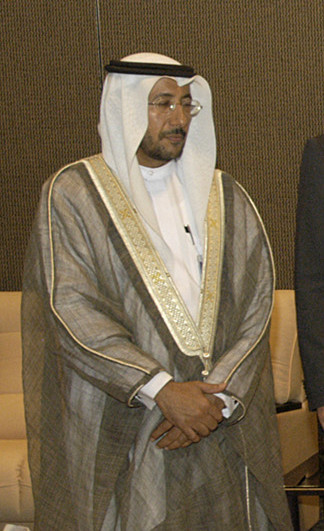
Mohammed Khalfan Bin Kharbash at a meeting of the World Bank and IMF in 2003

Mohammed Khalfan Bin Kharbash (Arabic: محمد خلفان بن خرباش) (c.1955 – 12 March 2016) was the former minister of finance and industry of the United Arab Emirates (1997–2007). From the Emirate of Dubai, he also chaired a number of banks' boards.
