= Dubai Cares =

UAE-based global philanthropic organization

Dubai Cares دبي العطاء
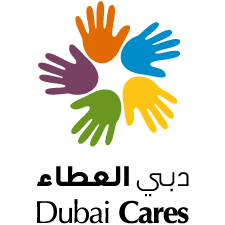
- Type: Nonprofit
- Purpose: Breaking the cycle of poverty through education
- Headquarters: Dubai
- Location: UAE
- Chairperson: Reem Al Hashimi
- CEO: Dr. Tariq Al Gurg
- Website: https://www.dubaicares.ae/

Dubai Cares is a UAE-based global philanthropic organization that advocates for children's rights. It was founded on September 19, 2007 by Mohammed bin Rashid Al Maktoum, Vice President and Prime Minister of the UAE and Ruler of Dubai.
