= Ahmad Al Tayer =

Former Emirati politician

Ahmad Al Tayer is a former minister in the United Arab Emirates from 1973 to 2004. In November 2009, he became the governor of Dubai International Financial Centre. Al Tayer held several positions in the cabinet including finance, transportation and communications. He is a director of Dubai Bank.
