= Maitha Salem Al Shamsi =

Maitha Salem Al Shamsi Her Excellency Dr. Maitha bint Salem Al Shamsi currently serves as a Minister of State in the United Arab Emirates and as an Advisor to Her Highness Sheikha Fatima bint Mubarak, "Mother of the Nation,"and as Chairperson of the Supreme Committee of the Sheikha Fatima Fund for Refugee Women.

== Biography ==
She holds a Ph.D. in Sociology and is an esteemed researcher in various social fields, with a strong interest in scientific research. She previously served as Vice Chancellor for Research at the United Arab Emirates University, Dr. Al Shamsi has authored numerous books and research studies in the fields of women, population, and development, including her latest book, Fatima bint Mubarak: Illuminations in Thought and Action.

She has also participated as an expert in several scientific conferences and collaborated with multiple United Nations organizations, including ESCWA, UNIFEM, UNESCO, and the UNHCR. Additionally, she has represented the UAE in numerous international conferences.

Dr. Al Shamsi has made significant contributions through her membership in various international, regional, and local committees, including:

- Board Member of Abu Dhabi University
- Advisory Board Member for the Arab Knowledge Report
- Board Member of Sorbonne University Abu Dhabi
- Scientific Committee Member of UNESCO for Arab States in Education and Research

Currently, she chairs the UAE-Japan Friendship Committee for Women’s Career Development and is a member of the Board of Trustees of the Arab Open University.

Her distinguished expertise in development, education, and national project management has earned her prestigious awards, including:

- Mohammed bin Rashid Al Maktoum Award for Arab Management (2003) – for being the "Outstanding Arab Female Administrator in the Arab World"
- Recognition as one of the Top 2000 Personalities of the 21st Century (2002) – by the International Biographical Centre in Cambridge, UK
- Certificate of Appreciation from the French Ministry of Higher Education and Research (2008) – for her contributions to establishing Sorbonne University Abu Dhabi
- Forbes Award for the 200 Most Powerful Women in the Arab World (2014)
- The Order of the Rising Sun, Gold and Silver Star (2018) – awarded by the Government of Japan
