= Reem Al Hashimy =

Emirati Minister of State

Her Excellency Reem Al Hashimy
- ريم الهاشمي
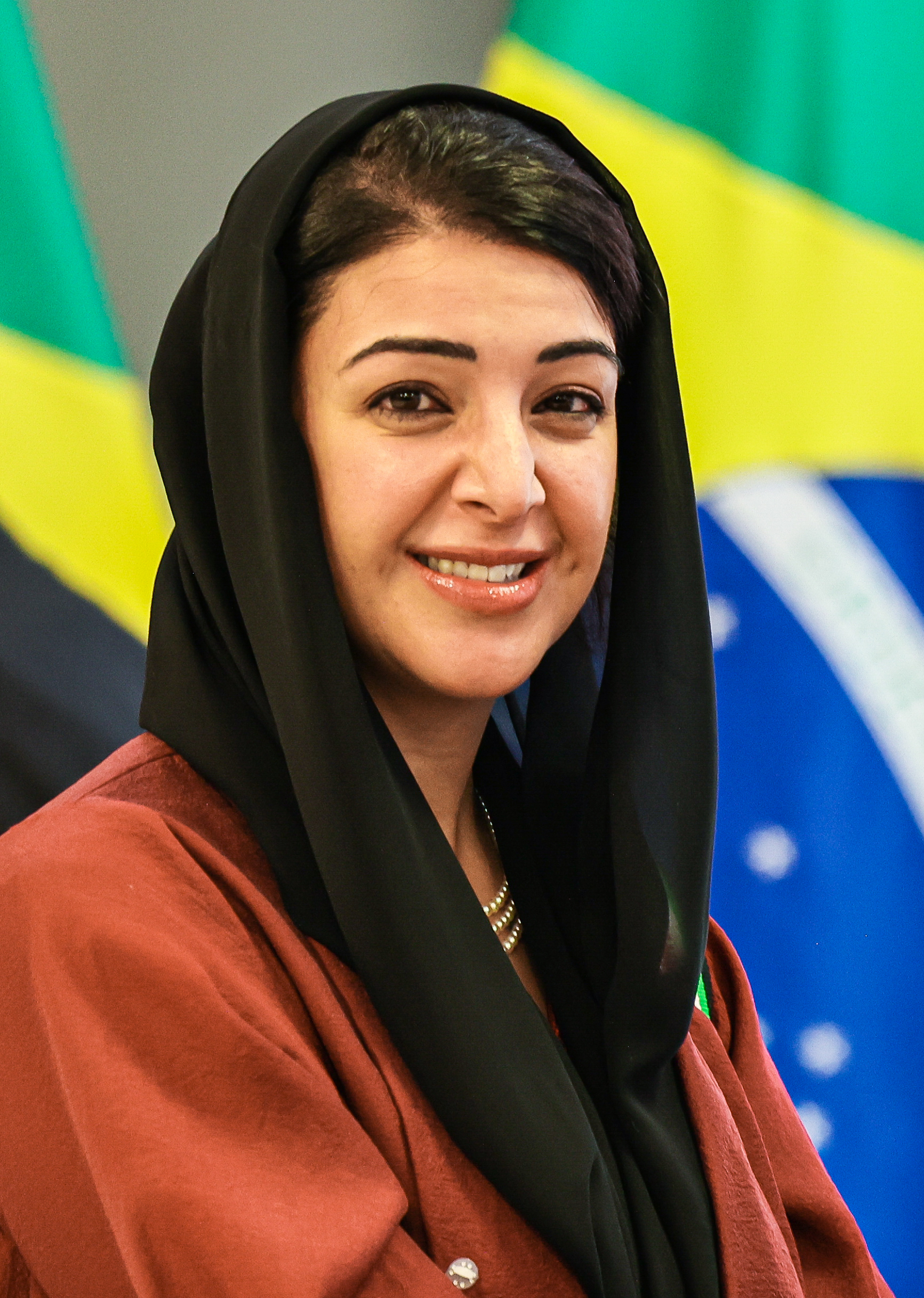
- Al Hashimy in 2023

Minister of State for International Cooperation
- Incumbent
- Assumed office 14 February 2016
- President: Khalifa bin Zayed Al Nahyan; Mohammed Bin Zayed Al Nahyan
- Prime Minister: Mohammed bin Rashid Al Maktoum

CEO of Expo City Dubai Authority
- Incumbent
- Assumed office 15 July 2022
- Preceded by: Office established

Minister of State
- In office 21 February 2008 – 14 February 2016
- President: Khalifa bin Zayed Al Nahyan
- Prime Minister: Mohammed bin Rashid Al Maktoum

Director General of Expo 2020
- In office 25 June 2014 – 15 July 2022
- Preceded by: Office established
- Succeeded by: Office abolished

Personal details
- Born: Reem Ebrahim Al Hashimy; 1978 (age 47–48) United Arab Emirates
- Education: Tufts University (BA); Harvard University (MA); Tsinghua University (PhD)

Reem Bint Ebrahim Al Hashimy (Arabic: ريم بنت إبراهيم الهاشمي) is an Emirati politician and the Minister of State for International Cooperation in the United Arab Emirates' Ministry of Foreign Affairs and International Cooperation.

== Education ==
Al Hashimy completed her undergraduate degree at Tufts University, earning a BA in international relations and French, followed by a master's degree from Harvard University. She also holds a PhD from Tsinghua University.

== Career ==
Al Hashimy began her career as Commercial Attaché, and subsequently Deputy Chief, of the UAE Embassy to the United States of America in Washington D.C.

She was appointed Minister of State in the Cabinet of the United Arab Emirates in February 2008. She was appointed to her current role as UAE Minister of State for International Cooperation in February 2016.

She chairs the National Committee on Sustainable Development Goals in the UAE. She was formerly chair of the UAE Federal Competitiveness and Statistics Authority. She is Chairperson of Dubai Cares and the Sorbonne University Abu Dhabi. In September 2022, she became the first female Emirati politician to deliver a statement for the UAE at the High-Level General Debate of the UN General Assembly. She led the successful bid to host the World expo in Dubai. In June 2014, she was appointed Managing Director of the Dubai Expo 2020 Higher Committee, and Director General of the Expo 2020 Dubai Bureau.

In an interview on CNN and in response to the opposition to the Abraham accords She said "in the Arab world and in the Middle East by and large there are certainly "naysayers" but in the UAE we believe very strongly in the need to open conversation and ties (with Israel). She has met the Israeli Foreign minister Yair Lapid on Dubai Expo grounds in 2021, and has previously slammed the October 7 attacks on Israel as “barbaric” and call for the unconditional release of the hostages, She has also met Israeli Ambassador on occasion of end of his tenure in UAE on 9 October 2024 (two days after the anniversary of 7 October) and has affirmed the UAE’s unwavering position in rejecting violence and escalation that serve to further increase the risks of instability.

=== Expo 2020 Dubai ===
In 2011, Al Hashimy was appointed by Sheikh Mohammed bin Rashid Al Maktoum to the role of Managing Director of the Higher Committee for Hosting the World Expo 2020. She led the successful bid to host the World expo in Dubai. In June 2014, she was appointed Managing Director of the Dubai Expo 2020 Higher Committee, and Director General of the Expo 2020 Dubai Bureau. The event, which was delayed by one year due to the COVID-19 pandemic, eventually welcomed 24.1 million visitors over six months between October 2021 and March 2022.

A conversation between Al Hashimy and composer A. R. Rahman in 2019 led to the creation of the all-women Firdaus Orchestra. In July 2022, it was announced that she would continue her work as CEO of Expo City Dubai Authority.

=== Gaza Reconstruction Committee ===
Al Hashimy is part of the members of the committee from January 2026.

== Personal life ==
Reem Al Hashimy comes from a prominent Emirati family with a long history of involvement in public service and government. Her father, Dr. Saeed Al Hashimy, was a former UAE Minister of State.

== See also ==
- List of Emiratis
- Women in the Arab world
- Women in the United Arab Emirates
