= Abdullah Al Nuaimi =

Emirati government official

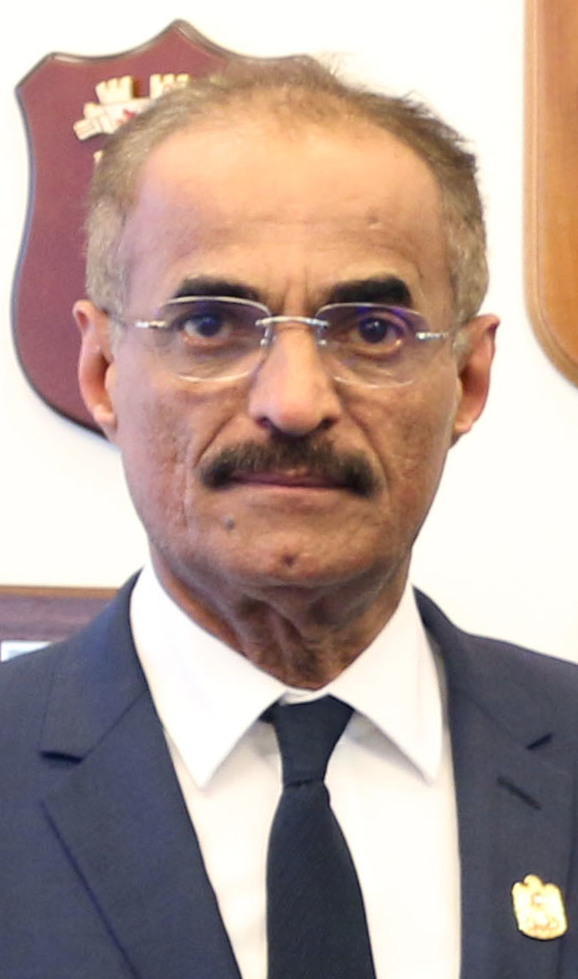
- Abdullah Al Nuaimi in 2019

Minister of Climate Change and Environment
- In office 5 July 2020 – 2021
- President: Khalifa bin Zayed
- Prime Minister: Mohammed bin Rashid
- Preceded by: Thani bin Ahmed Al Zeyoudi
- Succeeded by: Mariam Almheiri

Minister of Infrastructure Development
- In office 12 March 2013 – July 2020
- Prime Minister: Mohammed bin Rashid
- Preceded by: Hamdan bin Mubarak Al Nahyan
- Succeeded by: Suhail Al Mazroui

Personal details
- Born: Abdullah bin Mohammad Belhaif Al Nuaimi
- Education: University of Wisconsin–Madison; University of Reading

Abdullah Al Nuaimi is an Emirati engineer and politician. He was the minister of infrastructure development from 2013 to 2020 and the minister of climate change and environment for one year between 2020 and 2021.

== Education ==
Nuaimi holds a bachelor's degree in mechanical engineering, which he obtained from University of Wisconsin–Madison in 1980. He received a PhD in engineering project management from the University of Reading in 1990.

== Career ==
Nuaimi is an engineer by profession. He served as a distribution manager at the ministry of water and electricity. Then he worked at the civil aviation authority as engineering manager where he improvement the Abu Dhabi International Airport and its extensions. He was also a visiting professor at the Higher College of Technology in Dubai.

He served as undersecretary at the ministry of public works until March 2013. In a reshuffle on 12 March 2013, he was appointed minister of public works to the cabinet led by Prime Minister Mohammed bin Rashid Al Maktoum, replacing Hamdan bin Mubarak Al Nahyan in the post. Nuaimi is also the director of Etihad Rail and national transport authority. He is a board member of the following: Union Railway Company, Federal Electricity and Water Authority and the Tennis Emirates. He was announced as the new minister of climate change and environment on 5 July 2020.
