= Sultan bin Saeed Al Mansoori =

Emirati engineer and politician

H.E. Eng. Sultan Bin Saeed AlMansoori
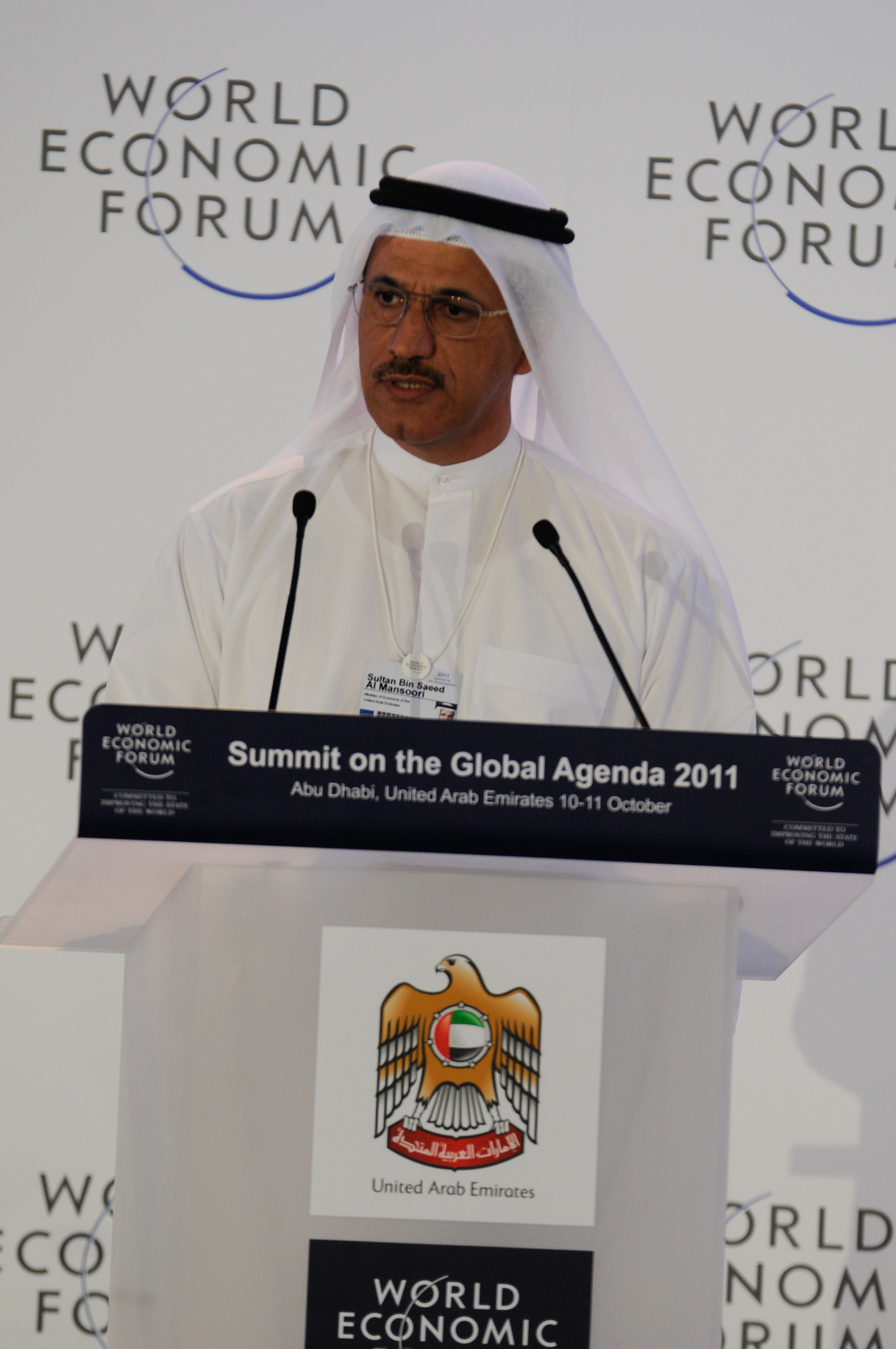
- Sultan bin Saeed Al Mansoori at the World Economic Forum's Summit held in Abu Dhabi, October 2011

Minister of the Economy
- In office 17 February 2008 – 5 July 2020
- Succeeded by: Abdulla bin Touq Al Marri

Minister of Governmental Sector Development
- In office 2006–2008

Minister of Transport and Communication
- In office 2004–2006

Minister of Communication

Sultan bin Saeed Al Mansoori is an Emirati engineer who was the Minister of the Economy of the United Arab Emirates from 2008 until 2020.

== Biography ==
Sultan bin Saeed Al Mansoori holds a bachelor's degree in industrial engineering and management systems from Arizona State University.

Sultan bin Saeed Al Mansoori was Minister of Communication (...-2004), Minister of Transport and Communication (2004–2006), and Minister of Governmental Sector Development (2006–2008).

Sultan bin Saeed Al Mansoori was appointed Minister of the Economy in a cabinet reshuffle on 17 February 2008. Part of his program as Minister is to reduce the country's dependence on oil revenues. In March 2015, the Ministry of Economy allowed full ownership of foreign companies in the country's free zones. In November 2018, he laid out his strategy to strengthen ties between the UAE and Latin American countries, while maintaining a strong bilateral trade strategy with China.

By virtue of his ministership, he is also the Chairman of UAE's General Civil Aviation Authority.

== See also ==
- Economy of the United Arab Emirates
- UAE vision 2021
