= Ministry of Health and Prevention (United Arab Emirates) =

Government ministry of the United Arab Emirates

- وزارة الصحة
- Logo of the UAE Ministry of Health and Prevention

Ministry overview
- Formed: 2 February 1972; 54 years ago
- Jurisdiction: Federal government of the United Arab Emirates
- Headquarters: Dubai, United Arab Emirates
- Minister responsible: Abdul Rahman Mohammed Al Oweis, Minister of Health and Prevention
- Website: mohap.gov.ae

The Ministry of Health and Prevention (MoHAP) (Arabic: وزارة الصحة) is the ministry of the Government of United Arab Emirates which is responsible for the implementation of health care policy in all areas of technical, material, and coordination with the Ministries of State, and cooperation with the private sector in health locally and internationally. The ministry is led by the minister, Abdul Rahman Mohammed Al Oweis.
