= Mohammed Saeed Al Mulla =

Emirati banker and politician (1926–2023)

Mohammad Saeed Al Mulla (1926 – 2 February 2023) was an Emirati banker and politician.

Al Mulla was born in Shindigha, Dubai in 1926, when Dubai's population was less than 10,000. His father (Saeed) died when Mohammed was two, and was a merchant in the pearl industry. Although his father was less known for his commercial activities, he was more known as a civic organizer. He was the Imam of the Al Mulla Mosque in Shindigha, and organized informal majlis gatherings for community members and visitors.

Al Mulla started his trade in 1952, when he travelled to Burma through Calcutta, to buy wood, coffee and rice. The pearl industry was the major income source for the city, and was devastated as a result of the introduction of pearl farming from Japan as well as the great depression. Many of the merchants of the Persian Gulf region, with seafaring experience entered into the market of reexporting gold into India.

Al Mulla was one of the many traders who entered this business, and was successful enough to enter the merchant council at the beginning of Dubai's entrepreneurial ventures.

The subsequent discovery of oil which brought wealth was directed to the construction of infrastructure and projects for the nation. Al Mulla, established a construction company in the middle of the 1960s, and won a number of tenders, and as a result of his close relationship to leadership, he was assigned the task of building the first palace of Sheikh Zayed in Al Ain.

Al Mulla died on 2 February 2023, at the age of 97.

== National Bank of Dubai, now EmiratesNBD ==
One of his significant contributions to Dubai was the establishment of the National bank of Dubai with Ali bin Abdullah Al Owais. The following is an excerpt interview with Essa Nasser Al Serkal.

“In 1963 Ali bin Ali bin Abdullah Al Owais visited me with the company of Muhammad Saeed Al Mulla, and they told me that they decided to establish a national bank in Dubai with a capital of one million pounds sterling, i.e. 14 million and 500 thousand rupees, and they asked me to join them and contribute to the project, as well as seeking to persuade local merchants To contribute to it, and he managed to persuade a number of well-known merchants to contribute with us, and in this way the National Bank of Dubai Limited was established by a decree of Sheikh Rashid bin Saeed, the ruler of Dubai, and appointed the board of directors headed by Ali Abdullah Al Owais, membership of Nasser bin Abdul Latif Al-Serkal, Mohammed Saeed Al-Mulla, Mohammed Mahdi Al-Tajer, Youssef Habib Al Habib and Mir Hashem Khoury and Cel Ali Al Owais. Nasser bin Abd Al-Latif was elected as Vice President, and Mr. Mack, a British national, was appointed as the General Manager of the bank .... ».

== Dubai Chamber of Commerce ==
In 1965 Al Mulla was chosen to be the first Chairman of the Board of Directors of the Dubai Chamber of Commerce and Industry, which was established that year in order to play a vital role in improving the business climate and supporting and protecting the interests of the business community in the emirate.

The role of the chamber was to encourage, and regulate business affairs in the city. Initially it had over 500 firms registered which grew to 3000 in the subsequent 5 years. The chamber as well administered business disputes, including the regulation of promissory notes, which were previously not regulated.

== Emirates post ==
Mohammed Al Mulla is also considered one of the founders of "Dubai Post", which issued the first set of postage stamps in the name of the Trucial Emirates in January 1961, knowing that the first postal agency in Dubai was opened in August 1909 as an agency of the Indian Post and managed by him, before under his supervision first transferred to the post Pakistani in October 1947 and then to Britain in the year 1948 after the independence of British India in that year.

== Minister of Unification of the United Arab Emirates ==
In the first ministerial formation in the young state headed by the late Sheikh Maktoum bin Rashid Al Maktoum, he was entrusted with a portfolio of the Ministry of State for Union and Gulf Affairs.

On May 2, 1975, the late Sheikh Zayed, in his capacity as President of the United Arab Emirates, issued Resolution No. 2 of 1975 establishing a constituent committee to prepare a draft permanent constitution for the state. The first article of the decision mentioned the names of the members of the constituent committee and they were 28 of the country's personalities. The name of Mohammed Saeed Al-Mulla was among those names. Rather, it was ranked third after Sheikh Surur bin Muhammad Al Nahyan and His Excellency Ahmed Khalifa Al-Suwaidi.

Thus Al Mulla contributed, not only in the field of services that his country needed in its early years, but also participated in the drafting of its legislation by preparing a constitution appropriate to it and its aspirations in partnership with other citizens such as: Thani bin Isa bin Hareb, Rashid bin Hamid bin Sultan, Hammouda Bin Ali, Ali Muhammad Al-Shurafa, Muhammad Mahdi Al-Tajer, Abdulaziz Hamid Al-Qasimi, Abdul Rahman Saeed Ghanem, Khalfan Al-Roumi, Rashid Abdullah Al-Nuaimi, Muhammad Saeed Al-Ghaith, Saeed Juma Al-Naboodah, Khaled Bin Khaled Khadem, Ahmed Ibrahim Al-Ghorbouti, Issa Ali Al-Mazroui, Salem Ibrahim Darwish, Rashid Abdullah Taha, Muhammad Ibrahim Abdullah, Abdullah Amin, Khali Fifa bin Saif Khalifa Al Muhairi, Saeed Muhammad Al Raqbani, Abdullah Sultan Al Salami, Sulaiman Musa Jassim, Muhammad Saif Abdullah, Ateeq Abdul Rahman Atiq, Abdullah Juma Bouharon.

== Minister of Transportation and Communication ==
As for the second ministerial formation in 1973, which was also headed by Sheikh Maktoum bin Rashid Al Maktoum, he was assigned the transportation portfolio (perhaps because of his accumulated experiences in the field of post and communications). And when Sheikh Maktoum reconstituted the federal government for the third time in 1977, he kept Al Mulla Minister of Transportation, and so did Sheikh Rashid bin Saeed Al Maktoum in 1979 when he headed the fourth federal government. Al-Mulla kept the same ministerial portfolio in the fifth formation in 1990 headed by Sheikh Maktoum, and was replaced by Ahmed Humaid al-Tayer in the sixth ministerial formation in 1997.

Part of the portfolio of communication was the establishment of the Emirates Telecommunications Company (Etisalat), which was established on August 30, 1976 and he was the first chairman of its board of directors.

Of the notable initiatives which were launched along with Etisalat is the first satellite telecommunication company Thuraya. Thuraya was officially founded in April 1997. A group of eight founders raised a total capital amounting to US$500 million, paving the way for an agreement to be signed with Boeing to manufacture Thuraya's first satellite.

== Private business ==
In 1978, Al-Mulla decided to devote himself to his private business with the participation of his sons. On February 1, 1978, he issued a decree signed by Sheikh Rashid bin Saeed Al Maktoum, the ruler of Dubai to agree to establish a limited liability company under the name of “Mohammed Saeed Al Mulla and Sons Private Limited Company”. The decree clarified the main purposes of the company, namely "to acquire shares and shares in other companies and to engage in any other trade or business of any kind."

In the following years, this commercial entity began to grow, expand, and diversify its investment and business fields under the management of Al-Mulla in the fields of engineering, business administration and others and acquired practical experiences from working in the public and private sectors, until that entity became a «Al Mulla Holding Group» which owns the Ritz Carlton Dubai, the American Hospital, a real estate portfolio which includes Al Mulla Plaza among other projects.
