= Rashid Ahmad bin Fahad =

Politician

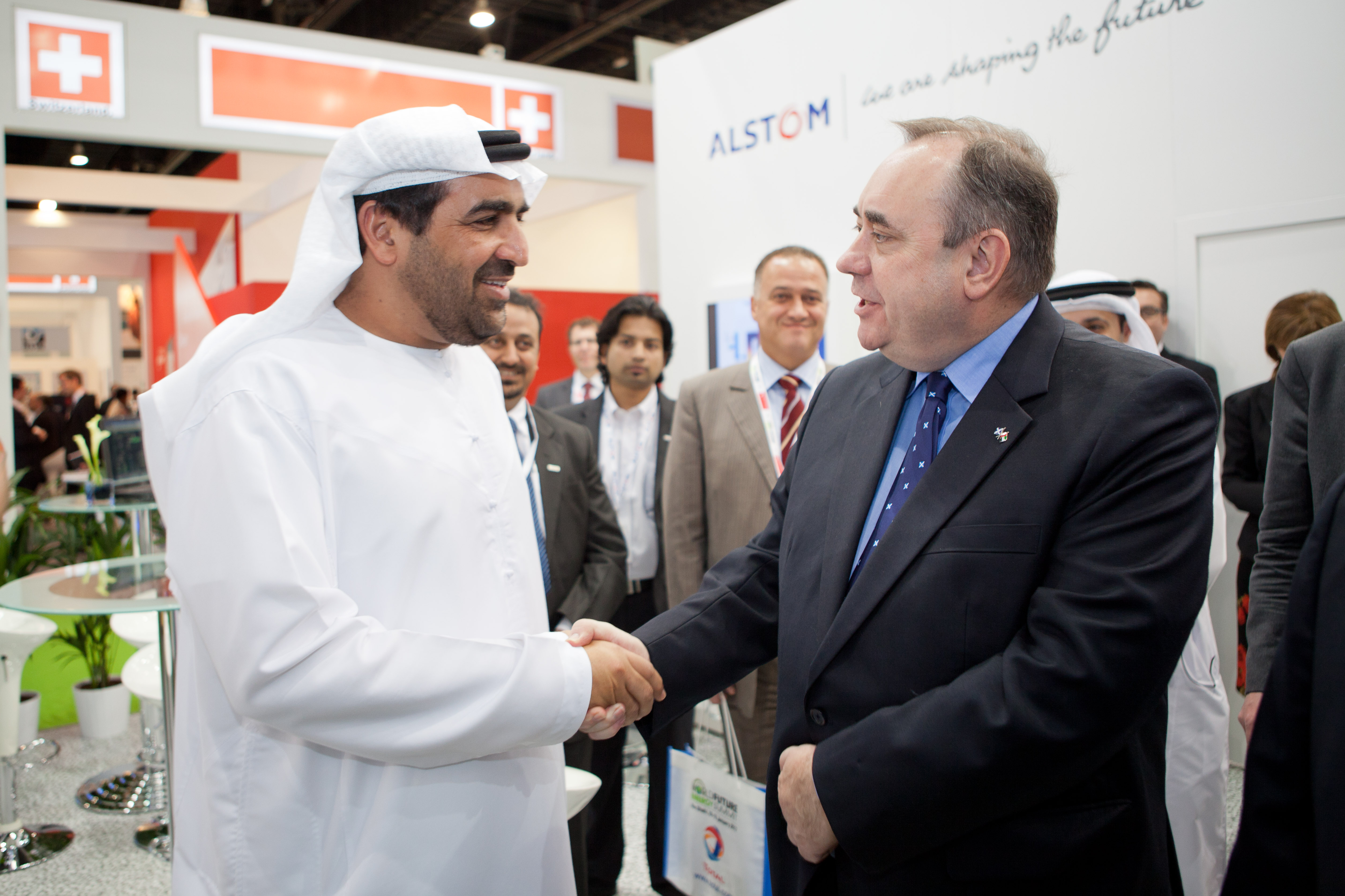
- First Minister of Scotland Alex Salmond with Rashid Ahmed bin Fahad in 2012

Minister of Environment and Water
- In office February 2008 – February 2016
- President: Khalifa bin Zayed Al Nahyan
- Prime Minister: Mohammed bin Rashid Al Maktoum
- Succeeded by: Thani bin Ahmed Al Zeyoudi

Rashid Ahmad bin Fahad (Arabic: رَاشِـد أَحْـمَـد مُـحَـمَّـد بِـن فَـهَـد) was born in Dubai, the United Arab Emirates, in 1964. He was the Minister of Environment & Water from February 2008 to February 2016.

He holds a PhD in Civil Engineering (Environmental Specialization) from the University of Strathclyde, Scotland, UK (2001), a Master's in Environmental Sciences from the United Arab Emirates University in Al Ain (1994), and a Bachelor's in Chemical Engineering from Northeastern University in Boston, USA.
