= Saeed Al Ghaith =

Minister of State for Cabinet Affairs

Saeed Al Ghaith is the former Minister of State for Cabinet Affairs in the United Arab Emirates. In this capacity, he was responsible for overseeing the operations and coordination of the UAE Cabinet. The role of the Minister of State for Cabinet Affairs involves ensuring the smooth functioning of Cabinet meetings, assisting with policy implementation, and coordinating between various ministries to execute the general policy of the federal government. Al Ghaith's position also involved overseeing the development and implementation of government regulations and policies across a variety of sectors, policy discussions, such as those regarding health services and national budget allocations
