= Abdul Rahman Mohammed Al Owais =

Emirati politician (born 1967)

His Excellency Abdul Rahman Mohammed Al Owais
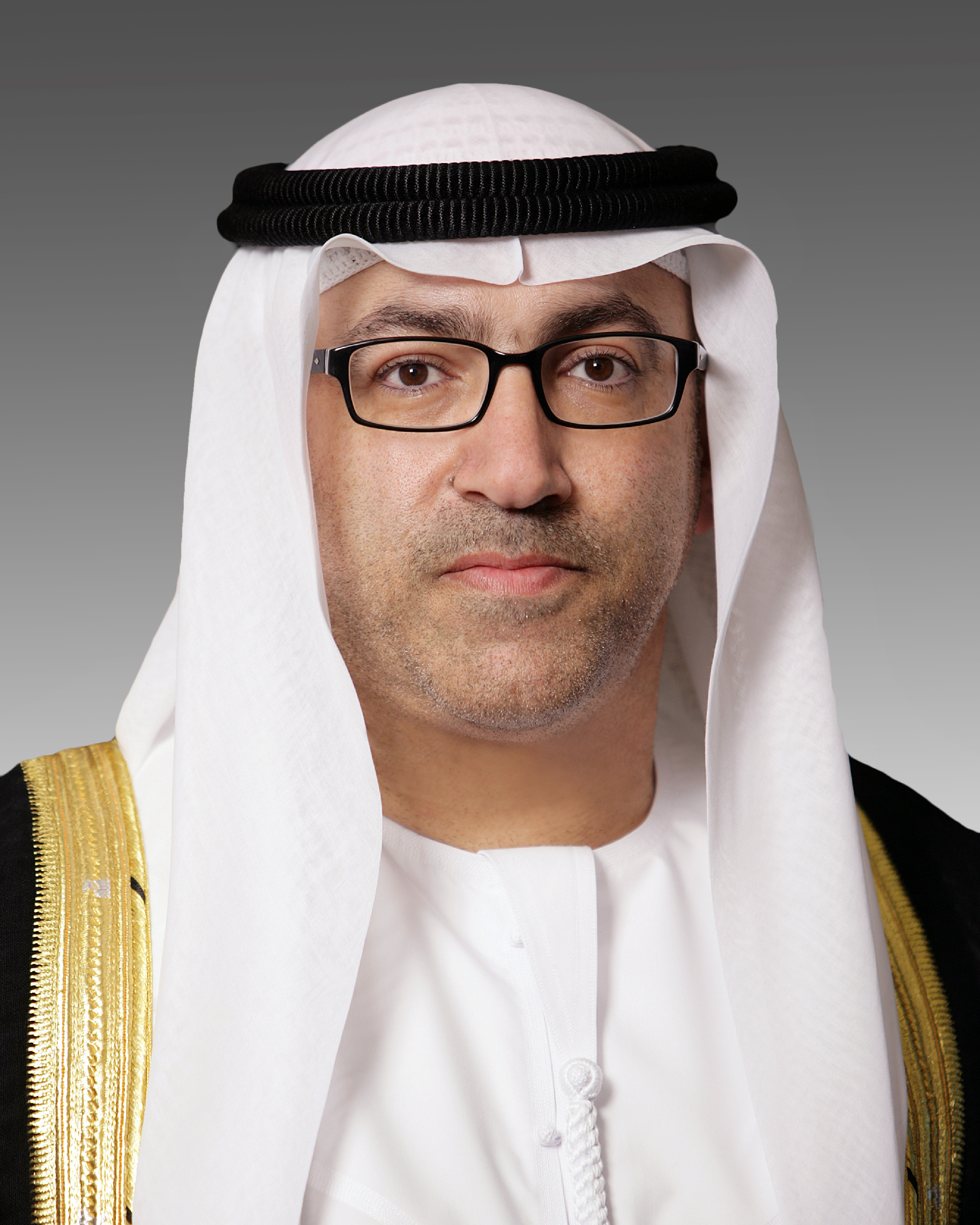
- Minister of Health

Minister of Health
- Incumbent
- Assumed office 12 March 2013
- President: Khalifa bin Zayed Al Nahyan; Mohammed bin Zayed Al Nahyan
- Prime Minister: Mohammed bin Rashid Al Maktoum
- Preceded by: Himself (Acting)
- Acting
- In office 13 September 2011 – 12 March 2013
- President: Khalifa bin Zayed Al Nahyan
- Prime Minister: Mohammed bin Rashid Al Maktoum
- Preceded by: Hanif Hassan Ali
- Succeeded by: Himself

Minister of State for Federal National Council Affairs
- Incumbent
- Assumed office 20 October 2017
- President: Khalifa bin Zayed Al Nahyan
- Prime Minister: Mohammed bin Rashid Al Maktoum
- Preceded by: Anwar Mohammed Gargash

Minister of Culture and Knowledge Development
- In office 09 February 2006 – 12 March 2013
- President: Khalifa bin Zayed Al Nahyan
- Prime Minister: Mohammed bin Rashid Al Maktoum
- Preceded by: Office established
- Succeeded by: Nahyan bin Mubarak Al Nahyan

Personal details
- Education: United Arab Emirates University

Abdul Rahman Bin Mohammed Al Owais (1967) is the minister of health in the United Arab Emirates.

A graduate of the United Arab Emirates University, Al Owais attained a bachelor's degree in Accounting and Information. He then became the Minister of Culture, Youth and Community Development in 2006. Thereafter, Al Owais was appointed as Acting Minister of Health in 2011 and served until 2013.

In 2013, Al Owais was appointed as minister of health. In this capacity, he was later appointed by WHO Director-General Tedros Adhanom Ghebreyesus to serve on the Independent High-level Commission on Non-Communicable Diseases from 2018 until 2019.
