= Ahmed bin Khalifa Al Suwaidi =

Emirati politician

- أحمد بن خليفة السويدي

Minister of Foreign Affairs
- In office 09 December 1971 – 20 November 1990
- President: Zayed bin Sultan Al Nahyan
- Prime Minister: Maktoum bin Rashid Al Maktoum; Rashid bin Saeed Al Maktoum
- Preceded by: Office established
- Succeeded by: Rashid Abdullah Al Nuaimi

Personal details
- Born: 15 December 1937 (age 88) Abu Dhabi, Trucial States (present-day United Arab Emirates)
- Relatives: Ousha bint Khalifa Al Suwaidi (sister)

Ahmed bin Khalifa Al Suwaidi (Arabic: أحمد بن خليفة السويدي; born 15 December 1937) is an Emirati politician who was the first minister of foreign affairs of the United Arab Emirates from 1971 to 1990, and the personal representative of the president of the UAE. He played a significant role in the unification of the UAE and was the first to read the statement of the founding of the country on 2 December 1971.

== Awards ==
- Abu Dhabi Awards, 2006
