= Mariam Almheiri =

Emirati politician (born 1979)

Her Excellency Mariam Almheiri
- مريم المهيري

Head of the International Affairs Affairs Office at the Presidential Court
- Incumbent
- Assumed office 11 January 2024
- President: Mohammed Bin Zayed Al Nahyan

Minister of Climate Change and Environment
- In office 26 September 2021 – 11 January 2024
- President: Mohammed Bin Zayed Al Nahyan; Khalifa Bin Zayed Al Nahyan
- Prime Minister: Mohammed bin Rashid Al Maktoum
- Preceded by: Abdullah Al Nuaimi
- Succeeded by: Amna Al Dahak Al Shamsi

Minister of State for Food & Water Security
- In office 20 October 2017 – 26 September 2021
- President: Khalifa bin Zayed Al Nahyan
- Prime Minister: Mohammed bin Rashid Al Maktoum
- Preceded by: Office established
- Succeeded by: Office abolished

Personal details
- Born: Mariam bint Mohammed Saeed Hareb Almheiri
- Education: RWTH Aachen University (BS, MS)

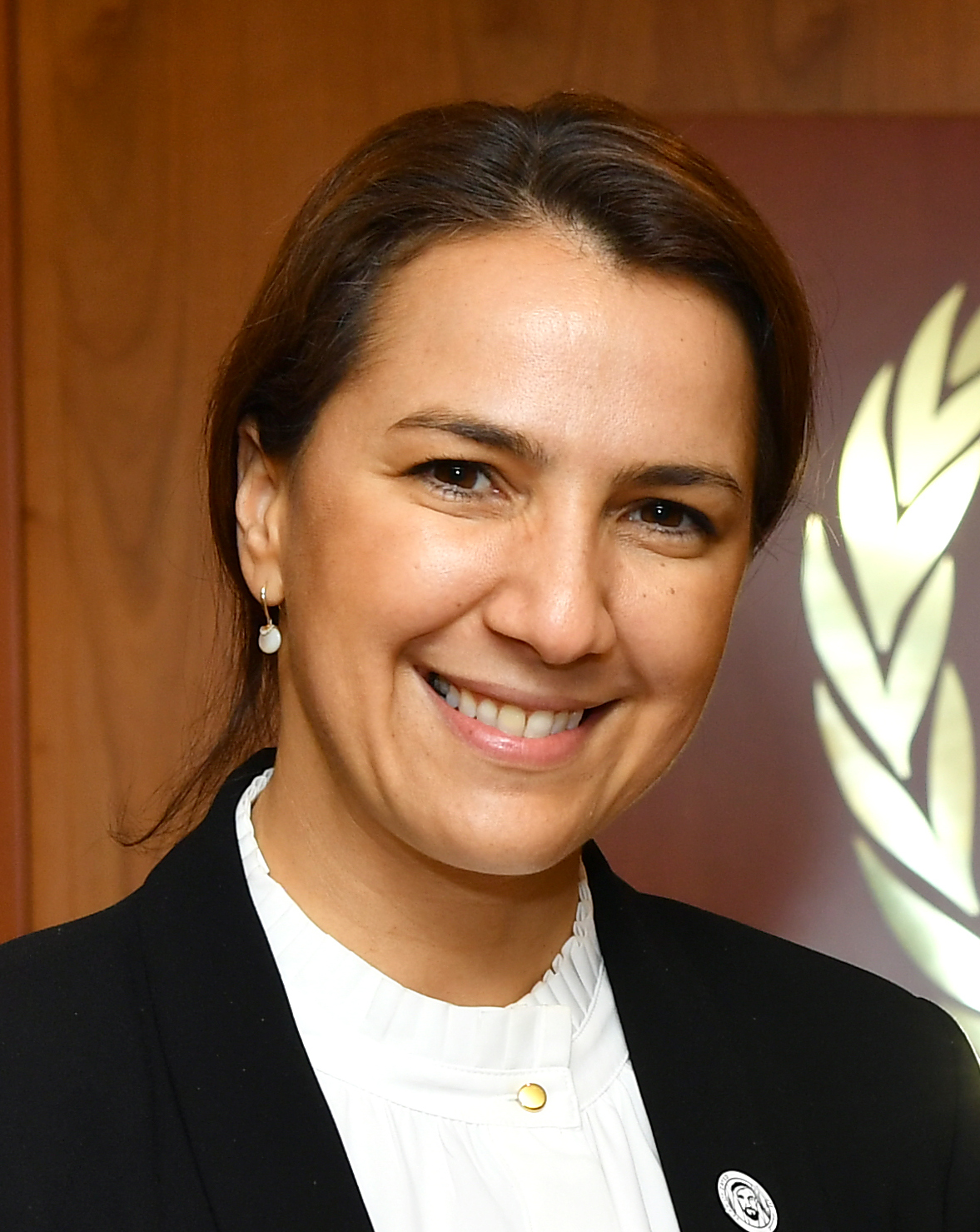
HE Ms. Mariam bint Mohammed Saeed Hareb Al Mehair, Minister of State for Food Security of the United Arab Emirates

Mariam bint Mohammed Saeed Hareb Almheiri (Arabic: مريم بنت محمد سعيد حارب المهيري) is an Emirati politician who is currently the head of the International Affairs Office at the Presidential Court. She previously served as the Minister of Climate Change and Environment in the United Arab Emirates until 11 January 2024.

== Early life and education ==
Almheiri was born in 1979 to an Emirati father and a German mother. She attended the Latifa School for Girls in Dubai and RWTH Aachen University in Germany, where she received bachelor's and master's degrees in mechanical engineering specialising in development and design engineering.

== Career ==
After graduation, Almheiri joined the Emirati Ministry of Environment and Water, where she was involved in the Khalifa Bin Zayed Centre for Marine Research, the UAE integrated waste management project, and the construction of a number of facilities. In 2014, she was appointed director of the Education and Awareness Department in the ministry, where she was responsible for formulating a national strategy to raise environmental awareness in the UAE.

In 2015, Almheiri was appointed assistant undersecretary for water resources and nature conservation affairs at the Ministry of Climate Change, after a period as acting assistant undersecretary.

In October 2017, Almheiri has been minister of state for food security. In September 2018, she announced plans for 'Food Valley,' a food technology hub in the UAE, named after Silicon Valley. In January 2019, she was made an overseer of the Security and Foreign Affairs sector of the UAE's National Expert Programme. In the same month, she launched the UAE Food Security Strategy, consisting of five pillars: diversification of sources of food imports, research and development to increase domestic food production, reduction of food waste, maintenance of food safety standards, and increasing the UAE's ability to respond to crises. The goal of the strategy is to see UAE's place on the Global food security index advance from 31 to first place by 2051.

Almheiri has also been a member of the board of the Emirates Equestrian Federation since 2016.
