= Shamma Al Mazrui =

United Arab Emirates politician (born 1993)

Her Excellency Shamma bint Suhail Al Mazrui
- شما بنت سهيل المزروعي

Minister of Community Development
- Incumbent
- Assumed office 6 March 2023
- President: Mohamed bin Zayed Al Nahyan
- Prime Minister: Mohammed bin Rashid Al Maktoum
- Preceded by: Hessa Essa Buhumaid

Minister of State for Youth Affairs
- In office 15 February 2016 – 6 March 2023
- President: Khalifa bin Zayed Al Nahyan; Mohamed bin Zayed Al Nahyan
- Prime Minister: Mohammed bin Rashid Al Maktoum
- Succeeded by: Sultan Al Neyadi (2024)

Personal details
- Born: 22 February 1993 (age 33) Abu Dhabi, United Arab Emirates
- Spouse: Mubarak bin Abdullah bin Mohammed Al Mazrouei
- Children: 1
- Education: New York University, Abu Dhabi (BA); University of Oxford (MPP)

Shamma bint Suhail bin Faris Al Mazrui (born 22 February 1993) is an Emirati politician who is currently serves as the minister of community empowerment of the United Arab Emirates. She previously served as the minister of state for youth affairs.

== Early life and education ==
Al Mazrui was born on 22 February 1993 in Abu Dhabi. Shamma is the daughter of Suhail bin Faris Ghanim Ateish Al Mazrui, a businessman, who was also the chairman of Dubai Investments board of directors for over 20 years. Shamma's brother Faris bin Suhail bin Faris Al Mazrui is the head of Mubadala's Ventures and Growth; while her twin brother Ahmed bin Suhail bin Faris Al Mazrui, is a businessperson.

Al Mazrui is an alumna of The International School of Choueifat, Abu Dhabi, Class of 2010.

Al Mazrui has a Bachelor of Arts in economics with a concentration in finance from New York University Abu Dhabi. She obtained her Masters of Public Policy from the Blavatnik School of Government at the University of Oxford in 2015. She was the UAE's first Rhodes scholar.

== Career ==
Al Mazrui worked in private equity in an Abu Dhabi sovereign wealth fund, and as a public policy analyst at the UAE Mission to the United Nations. She interned as a research analyst at the UAE Embassy in Washington D.C.; as a Ministry policy analyst in the prime minister's office, and as an education policy researcher at Tamkeen (Abu Dhabi's Strategic Affairs Authority).

Al Mazrui was appointed by Prime Minister Mohammed bin Rashid Al Maktoum as minister of state for youth affairs in February 2016 at age 22, making her the youngest member of the UAE cabinet. She presided over the National Youth Council, which brings together young professionals from a variety of backgrounds to represent the affairs of youth to the government. Al Mazrui was the vice chair of the Arab Youth Center (2016-2024).

Al Mazrui was appointed as chair of the Special Olympics UAE board in 2017. She is also the vice chair of the Community and Legacy Committee of the UAE Special Olympics World Games (2019).

On January 12, 2023, she was appointed as the UAE's COP28 Youth Climate Champion; she also served on the COP28 Advisory Committee, and the COP28 Higher Committee. On February 7, 2023, Sheikh Mohammed bin Rashid Al Maktoum announced a cabinet reshuffle where Shamma was appointed as the Minister of Community Development. Additionally, Shamma was the secretary general of the Education and Human Resources Council until August 12, 2024; and the former president of the National Center for Education Quality; she remains a board member of both the National Center for Education Quality and the Education, Human Development and Community Development Council. In July 2023, Shamma was appointed as the chair of the Zayed University Board of Trustees. Shamma is also a member of the UAE's International Humanitarian and Philanthropic Council. Additionally, Shamma is a board member of Erth Zayed Philanthropies, which was formed by a Federal Decree in November 2024, in affiliation with the UAE Presidential Court. Erth Zayed Philanthropies is an independent and legal venture responsible for supporting various institutions and groups in assisting with humanitarian causes.

== Awards and honours ==
- Rhodes Scholarship 2014
- Sheikh Mansour bin Zayed Distinction Award (2015)
- Coutts Future Leader Award (2015)
- New York University Abu Dhabi's inaugural Distinguished Alumni Award, 2016
- 2019: Youth Council Initiative awarded the Special Honors Shield for Most Distinguished Initiative. Presented by ruler of Dubai, Mohammed bin Rashid.
- First Class Order of Zayed II for her role as COP28 Youth Climate Champion. Presented by Mohammed bin Zayed and Mohammed bin Rashid.
- ABLF Award Recipient, 2022, Rising Star.
