= Ahmad Belhoul Al Falasi =

Emirati politician (born 1977)

His Excellency Ahmad Belhoul Al Falasi
- أحمد بالهول الفلاسي
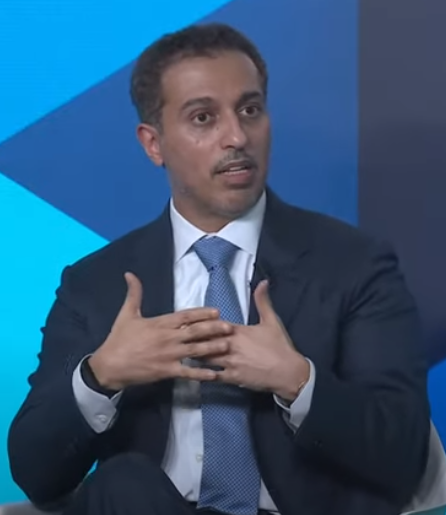

Minister of Sports
- In office July 2024 – Current
- President: Mohammed Bin Zayed Al Nahyan
- Prime Minister: Mohammed bin Rashid Al Maktoum

Chairman of the UAE Space Agency
- Incumbent
- Assumed office 2024
- President: Khalifa bin Zayed Al Nahyan; Mohammed Bin Zayed Al Nahyan
- Prime Minister: Mohammed bin Rashid Al Maktoum

Secretary-General of the Supreme Space Council
- Incumbent
- Assumed office October 2024

Chancellor of the Higher Colleges of Technology
- Incumbent
- Assumed office July 2024

Personal details
- Born: 24 November 1977 (age 48)
- Education: Khalifa University (BS); University of Melbourne (MS); Monash University (PhD)

Ahmad bin Abdullah Humaid Belhoul Al Falasi (Arabic: أحمد بن عبدالله حميد بالهول الفلاسي; born 24 November 1977) is an Emirati politician who is Minister of Sport of the United Arab Emirates. He has headed a number of state-owned organizations, as well as held UAE cabinet posts.

== Education ==
Al Falasi holds a Ph.D. from Monash University in Australia, an M.Sc. from the University of Melbourne, and a B.Sc. in Telecommunications Engineering from Khalifa University in Abu Dhabi.

== Career ==
He has worked for McKinsey & Company. He was Chief Executive Officer at the UAE state-owned energy company Masdar, Executive Director of Strategy and Tourism Sector Development at Dubai’s Department of Tourism and Commerce Marketing, and Vice President of the Industry Unit of Mubadala Development Company.

He was Minister of State for Higher Education from February 2016 to July 2020. In 2017, the ministry became the Ministry of State for Higher Education and Advanced Skills. On 5 July 2020, he was appointed as Minister of State for Entrepreneurship and SMEs.

He is a member of the board of the National Central Cooling Company PJSC (Tabreed), chairman of the Federal Authority for Human Resources, chairman of the UAE Space Agency (since June 2017), a columnist at Arab News, and chairman of the General Authority of Sports since Jan. 2021. He also represents the space sector in the National Science, Technology and Innovation Committee.

While Belhoul was Minister of State for Higher Education and Advanced Skills and chairman of the UAE Space Agency, the UAE’s Mars orbiter Misbar Al Amal was developed and launched on 19 July 2020 as part of the Emirates Mars Mission.

== See also ==
- Cabinet of the United Arab Emirates
- List of Emiratis
- House of Al Falasi
