= Rashid Abdullah Al Nuaimi =

Emirati diplomat and politician

- راشد عبدالله النعيمي
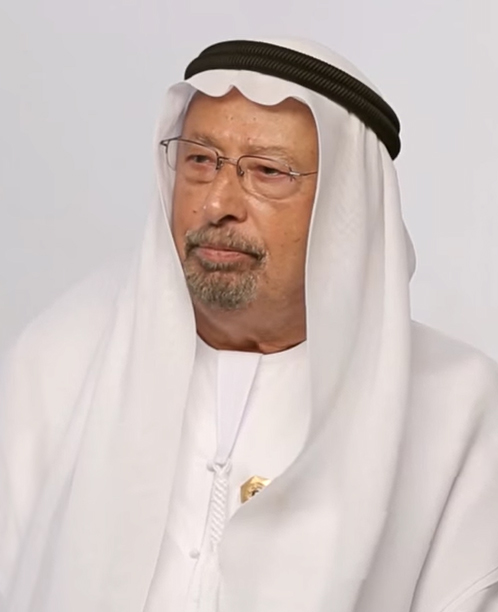
- Al-Nuaimi in 2015

Minister of Foreign Affairs
- In office 1990–2005
- Prime Minister: Mohammed bin Rashid Al Maktoum
- Preceded by: Ahmed Bin Khalifa Al Suwaidi
- Succeeded by: Abdullah bin Zayed Al Nahyan

Personal details
- Education: Cairo University

Rashid Abdullah Al Nuaimi (Arabic: راشد عبدالله النعيمي) is the former foreign minister of the United Arab Emirates.

== Early life and education ==
Nuaimi is a member of the ruling family of Ajman, Al Nuaimi. He holds a bachelor's degree in petroleum engineering, which he received from the University of Cairo in 1967.

== Career ==
Nuaimi started his career at the department of oil and industrial affairs in the Emirate of Abu Dhabi. Then he joined the Emirati ministry of foreign affairs and until 1975, he worked there in various capacities. In 1975, he was named as the director of political affairs department at the foreign ministry. In 1976, he became undersecretary for foreign affairs. He served as the minister of state for foreign affairs from 1977 to 1990. Hamdan bin Zayed succeeded him in the post.

In 2018, he received the Order of the Two Niles from Sudan.

In 2024, he received the Grand Cordon of the Order of the Rising Sun from Japan.

In 2025, he received the Abu Dhabi Award from UAE President Mohamed bin Zayed Al Nahyan in recognition of his distinguished service to the Emirate of Abu Dhabi.
