= Al Tayer Group =

Privately held holding company established in 1979

Al Tayer Group مجموعة الطاير
- Type: Holding company
- Founded: 1979; 47 years ago
- Headquarters: Dubai, UAE
- Key people: Obaid Al Tayer (Chairman)
- Owner: Obaid Al Tayer
- Number of employees: 5,000-10,000
- Website: altayer.com

Al Tayer Group (Arabic: مجموعة الطاير) is a privately held holding company established in 1979. Currently, the group operates in 6 countries in West Asia, including nearly 200 stores and 23 showrooms in multiple markets in the Middle East.

The company is headquartered in Dubai, UAE and employs nearly 9,000 people.

== Background ==
Al Tayer Group operates in several industries including automobile sales and service, luxury and lifestyle retail, perfumes and cosmetics distribution, engineering, real estate, and interiors contracting.

== Divisions ==
=== Automotive ===
The automotive division of Al Tayer Group was established in 1982 and represents European and American automobile manufacturers, including Land Rover, Jaguar, Ford, Lincoln, Ferrari, and Maserati. In Abu Dhabi, the company is represented through Premier Motors. The automotive division of Al Tayer Group also includes a car rental division established in 1994 which operates a fleet of 4500 vehicles in both rental and leasing in the UAE. The automotive division launched their smart application in 2020.

=== Retail ===
As a luxury retailer in the Middle East, Al Tayer, through its retail arm, Al Tayer Insignia, hosts brands in the fashion, beauty, hospitality, jewellery, home, and department store categories. Headquartered in the UAE, the retail division has expanded operations to the Kingdom of Saudi Arabia, Kuwait, Bahrain, Qatar, and Oman, and currently operates nearly 200 stores across the region and represents several of the world's most well-known brands, such as Bulgari, Yves Saint Laurent, Prada, and Ermenegildo Zegna. Al Tayer operates 22 Armani stores in the UAE and Kuwait.

In 2010, Al Tayer signed a deal with Macy's to open the first Bloomingdale's store outside the United States, in Dubai Mall. After four years, another deal was signed to open the second international Bloomingdale's store, in Kuwait City. In 2016, Al Tayer Insignia launched Ounass.com, a luxury retail e-commerce platform.

=== Ventures ===
Al Tayer Group has several investments and partnerships in diverse sectors including construction, engineering, freight transportation, and related services as well as precision tools manufacturing, healthcare, and cinema exhibitions. In addition to owning and operating a full-service travel agency, the Group's portfolio also includes commercial and residential real estate developments.

=== Cinema ===
Al Tayer Group has a number of investments and partnerships in various sectors, including construction, engineering, freight transport and related services, as well as precision instrument manufacturing, healthcare exhibitions and cinemas. In addition to owning and operating a full-service travel agency, the group's portfolio also includes commercial and residential real estate projects.

In 2018, Al Tayer partnered with Mexican cinema operator Cinépolis to develop movie theaters in the GCC region, including the first group of theaters in Saudi Arabia.

== See also ==
- List of companies of the United Arab Emirates
- Emaar Group
- Majid Al Futtaim Group
- Hayel Saeed Anam Group
- Al Shirawi Enterprises Group
