= Obaid Al Tayer =

Emirati businessman

- عبيد الطاير
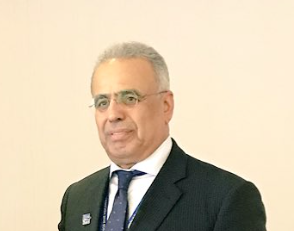

Minister of Finance of the United Arab Emirates
- Acting
- In office March 2021 – 25 September 2021
- Preceded by: Hamdan bin Rashid Al Maktoum
- Succeeded by: Maktoum bin Mohammed Al Maktoum

Personal details
- Born: October 1952 (age 73–74)
- Education: University of Colorado at Boulder (B.S.)
- Occupation: Chairman of Al Tayer Group

Obaid Al Tayer (Arabic: عبيد الطاير; born October 1952) is an Emirati businessman and politician. He is the Chairman of Al Tayer Group and served as cabinet member and Minister of State for Financial Affairs in the United Arab Emirates in the Ministry of Finance. He served in the cabinet until September 2021.

== Early life and education ==
Al Tayer earned a BS in electrical engineering from the University of Colorado.

== Career ==
From 1981 to 1991 Al Tayer was a member of the Etisalat board of directors. Al Tayer was a Board Member of Dubai Chamber of Commerce and Industry from 1982 to 1991, a Member of Dubai Municipal Council from 1982 to 1990, and a Member of Federal National Council from 1981 to 1985.

From 2000 to 2008 Al Tayer served as Chairman at the Dubai Chamber of Commerce and Industry. He also was a Member of the Dubai Economic Council from 2004 to 2008. In February 2008 Al Tayer joined the Federal Government of the United Arab Emirates.

In November 2019 Al Tayer was appointed as Chairman of Etisalat (Emirates Telecommunication Group Company PJSC). He replaced Eissa Mohamed Ghanem Al Suwaidi. The third leadership team meeting of the government procurement platform in 2019 was chaired by Al Tayer. The platform was launched by Mohammed bin Rashid Al Maktoum, the Vice President of the UAE.

Al Tayer also chaired the Annual Meeting of the World Bank Group (WBG) and International Monetary Fund (IMF) in 2019. Al Tayer served as a cabinet member and Minister of State for Financial Affairs. He was replaced in the cabinet in September 2021.

== Distinctions ==
In 2003 Al Tayer received the L'Ordre National Du Mérite by the President of the Republic of France. In 2007 he received the Order of the Star of Italian Solidarity by the President of the Republic of Italy. In 2012 he was awarded the “Finance Minister of the Year Middle East and North Africa for 2012” award by Emerging Markets Magazine.
