= Ministry of Foreign Affairs (United Arab Emirates) =

Government ministry of the United Arab Emirates

- وزارة الخارجية

Ministry overview
- Formed: 9 December 1971; 54 years ago
- Jurisdiction: Federal government of the United Arab Emirates
- Headquarters: Khor Qirqishan Street, Al Bateen, Abu Dhabi, United Arab Emirates
- Ministers responsible: Abdullah bin Zayed Al Nahyan, Minister of Foreign Affairs; Reem Al Hashimy, Minister of State for International Cooperation
- Website: mofa.gov.ae

The Ministry of Foreign Affairs (MoFA) (Arabic: وزارة الخارجية) is a federal government ministry in the United Arab Emirates responsible for overseeing the country's diplomatic relations as well as its foreign policy. The ministry is also responsible for maintaining UAE's government offices abroad with diplomatic and consular status.

== History ==
The MoFA was established on 9 December 1971, shortly after the formation of the United Arab Emirates on 2 December 1971. MoFA is responsible for formulating and implementing the UAE's foreign policy.

== Leadership ==
On 9 February 2006, Abdullah bin Zayed Al Nahyan assumed the role of Minister of Foreign Affairs. Al Nahyan was appointed as Deputy Prime Minister in mid-2024.

This is a list of foreign ministers of the United Arab Emirates.

No.	Portrait	Name (Birth–Death)	Term of office			Prime Minister(s)
No.	Portrait	Name (Birth–Death)	Took office	Left office	Time in office	Prime Minister(s)
1		Ahmed Bin Khalifa Al Suwaidi أحمد بن خليفة السويدي (1937–)	9 December 1971	20 November 1990	18 years, 346 days	Maktoum bin Rashid Al Maktoum (1971–1979) Rashid bin Saeed Al Maktoum (1979–1990)
2		Rashid Abdullah Al Nuaimi راشد عبدالله النعيمي	20 November 1990	4 January 2006	15 years, 45 days	Maktoum bin Rashid Al Maktoum (1990–2006)
4		Abdullah bin Zayed Al Nahyan عبدالله بن زايد آل نهيان (1972–)	9 February 2006	Incumbent	20 years, 180 days	Mohammed bin Rashid Al Maktoum (2006–present)

== Core functions ==
Along with foreign policy, the Ministry's major functions include:

- Represent the UAE in forums, summits, and international organizations.
- Managing and overseeing diplomatic and consular missions abroad.
- Consular services for UAE citizens abroad.
- Negotiate, sign, and oversee international treaties and agreements.
- Promote UAE values, culture, and foreign-policy worldwide.
- Engage in economic diplomacy - trade, investments, economic and development projects.
- Administer humanitarian and foreign-aid.
