= Maryam Mohammed Khalfan Al Roumi =

Emirati politician

- مريم محمد خلفان الرومي

Minister of Social Affairs
- In office 9 February 2006 – 2014
- Prime Minister: Mohammad bin Rashid Al Maktoum

Personal details
- Born: 2 February 1957 (age 69)
- Education: United Arab Emirates University

Maryam Mohammed Khalfan Al Roumi (Arabic: مريم محمد خلفان الرومي) born 2 February 1957) is an Emirati woman politician, who was the minister of social affairs from 2006 to 2014. She was the second woman to hold a cabinet post in the United Arab Emirates.

== Early life and education ==
Roumi was born on 2 February 1957. She received a bachelor's degree in English literature from the United Arab Emirates University in 1980.

== Career ==
Roumi was a research assistant at her alma mater, UAE University, from March 1983 to August 1983. She served as the chairman of the UAE special olympics from 1989 to 1994. She also served as the chairman of the higher advisory committee for the women higher colleges of technology in Abu Dhabi from 1990 to 1994. Then she became the director of Abu Dhabi's handicapped rehabilitation center and of center for special needs at the ministry of labor and social affairs where she served from April 1984 to February 1999. She served as the undersecretary of the ministry of labour and social affairs from February 1999 to February 2006. She was appointed minister of social affairs to the cabinet headed by prime minister Mohammed bin Rashid Al Maktoum on 9 February 2006. She retained her post in the reshuffle of May 2009.

=== Awards ===
Roumi holds an honorary doctorate from the University of Middlesex Dubai which was given to her in December 2009.

== Career ==
She has held several educational, social, marketing, and public administration positions. From February 1999 until her appointment as Minister of Social Affairs, she served as Undersecretary of the Ministry of Labour and Social Affairs. She also presided over the Marriage Fund Foundation from 2006 to 2008.

Throughout her career, she was a board member of numerous local and international institutions. She served as a member of the Ministerial Council for Services within the Council of Ministers since 2006, a member of the Ministerial Committee for Legislation within the Council of Ministers since 2007, and a member of the Arab International Women's Forum in London.
