= Borealis (company) =

Austrian chemical company

Borealis GmbH
- Type: [Limited Liability Company]
- Industry: Petrochemical industry
- Founded: 1994
- Headquarters: Vienna, Austria
- Key people: Stefan Doboczky (CEO)
- Products: polyolefins, hydrocarbons, and base chemicals
- Revenue: EUR 7.85 billion
- Net income: EUR 566 million
- Number of employees: 6,000 approx. (2024)
- Website: BorealisGroup.com

Borealis GmbH is an Austrian plastics manufacturer that is the second largest producer of polyolefins in Europe, as well as a leader in the petrochemicals industry. Based in Vienna, Austria, it employs around 6,000 people in over 120 countries.

== Overview ==
Borealis, an international provider of polyolefins and base chemicals, generated revenue of €7.85 billion and net profit of €566 million in 2024. Although it primarily operates in Europe, the firm has manufacturing plants in Belgium, Central Europe (Austria and Germany), Finland, and Sweden.

In addition, it operates compounding units in Brazil, Italy, and the United States, as well as five recycling plants in Austria, Germany, Belgium and Bulgaria. Furthermore, Borealis runs its Global Innovation Headquarters, two "Innovation Centres", and customer service centres in several countries.

It provides services and products globally in collaboration with Borouge, a joint venture with the Abu Dhabi National Oil Company (ADNOC).

== Innovation ==
Borealis employs over 500 people in research and development. There are two research centres in Sweden and Finland, as well as the International Innovation Headquarters in Linz, Austria. In the latter, 300 experts from 30 different nations work on the implementation of new ideas.

In 2023, it filed 128 new priority patent applications, once again ranking as number one top filer in the European Patent Index 2023. In total, its patent portfolio consists of approximately 8,900 granted patents and approximately 3,200 patent applications through to the end of 2023.

== History ==
Borealis was founded in 1994 by the merging of the petrochemical interests of Finnish Oil company Neste and the Norwegian oil company Statoil (now Equinor). Subsequently, OMV and IPIC took over the 50% business share of Neste after the former's petrochemical sector was included in 1998.

In June 2006, a year after Statoil relinquished its stake in the company, Borealis relocated its headquarters from Copenhagen to Vienna. After merging with Abu Dhabi's International Petroleum Investment Company (IPIC) in early 2017, Mubadala owned 64% of Boarealis through its holding company, while the remaining 36% belonging to Austria-based OMV, an integrated, international oil and gas company.

In April 2022, two years after it was reported that OMV held 75% of the shares and Mubadala the remaining 25%, ADNOC took over the latter stake. In July of the following year, the nitrogen business of Borealis, including fertilisers, melamine and technical nitrogen products, was sold to Agrofert.

In preparation for the formation of Borealis Group International, the firm's legal form was changed from an AG to a limited liability company (GmbH) in June 2025. Four months later, it was announced that Irth Solutions, a company backed by TPG Growth, had completed the purchase of Borealis.

== Products ==
=== Polyolefins ===
The polyolefin products manufactured by Borealis form the basis of many plastics applications.

==== Consumer products ====
Borealis supplies superior polyolefin plastic materials used in consumer products, advanced packaging and fibre. More specifically, Borealis polyolefins are used to make applications possible in flexible packaging (including blown film, heat seal and extrusion coating), rigid packaging (caps and closures, bottles, thin wall packaging, thermoforming), non-woven and technical fibres, and appliances.

==== Automotive ====
Borealis supplies polyolefin plastic materials for engineering applications in the automotive industry. Plastic materials replace conventional materials such as metal, rubber and engineering polymers. In automotive vehicles, Borealis’ polyolefin plastic materials are used in a wide range of exterior, interior, and under-the-bonnet applications, including bumpers, body panels, trims, dashboards, door claddings, climate control and cooling systems, air intake manifolds and battery cases.

==== Energy ====
The company provides extra-high, high and medium voltage cable applications as well as semi-conductive products that are used for energy transmission and distribution, data and communication cables, and for building and automotive wires and cables.

==== Pipes and fittings ====
Borealis offers pipes used in water and gas supply, wastewater and sewage disposal, in-house plumbing and heating, and the oil and gas industry, including multi-layer coatings for onshore and offshore oil and gas pipelines.

==== New business development ====
The company develops products in the areas of healthcare, plastomers and foamable materials.

=== Base chemicals ===
Borealis produces a wide range of base chemicals such as phenol, acetone, ethylene and propylene for use in numerous and diverse industries, as well as fertilizers and technical nitrogen products.

==== Hydrocarbons and energy ====
Borealis sources basic feedstock such as naphtha, butane, propane and ethane from the international oil and gas markets. They convert these into ethylene, propylene, and cracker co-products through their hydrocarbon units.

== Technology ==
=== Borstar proprietary technology ===
Borstar is Borealis' proprietary technology for manufacturing polyethylene (PE) and polypropylene (PP).

== Joint ventures ==
=== Borouge ===
Borouge is Borealis’ joint venture with the Abu Dhabi National Oil Company (ADNOC). Its facility is in Ruwais, Abu Dhabi (UAE) and consists of 3 facilities:

Borouge 1 was founded in 2001 and has an ethane-based cracker for production of 600.000 tonnes ethylene per year and two PE lines with a combined capacity of 580.000 tonnes/year and utilises Borealis' Borstar PE technology.

Borouge 2 was a major expansion project complete in 2010 which tripled the annual capacity of polyolefin capacity in Ruwais to 2 million tonnes/year.

Since its completion in 2016 the Borouge 3 plant expansion makes Borouge the world's largest integrated polyolefins complex. The additional 2.5 million tonnes of polyolefins capacity yield a total Borouge capacity of 4.5 million tonnes, and a combined Borealis and Borouge capacity of 8 million tonnes.

ADNOC and Borealis moved to the pre-FEED phase for the construction of the Borouge 4 complex, which is slated to come on stream in the end of 2025. Borouge 4 encompasses a mixed feedstock cracker, using existing feedstock available in Abu Dhabi and downstream derivatives units for both polyolefin and non-polyolefin products.

=== Borealis Brasil ===
Borealis Brasil S.A. is a joint venture between Borealis (80%) and the Brazilian Braskem (20%). Located in Itatiba and Triunfo in Brazil and formed in 1999. It serves the automotive industry in South America.

=== Baystar ===
Baystar is a joint venture between Borealis and TotalEnergies. The joint venture comprises an ethane-based steam cracker with an annual production capacity of one million tons of ethylene in Port Arthur, Texas, and a polyethylene plant in Pasadena, Texas, with a capacity of 625,000 metric tons per year. These production facilities enable Borealis to provide improved access to Borstar-based products directly manufactured in North America for local customers and partners.

== Acquisitions ==
=== mtm ===
In July 2016, Borealis acquired one of Europe's largest manufacturers of post-consumer polyolefin recyclates – mtm Plastics GmbH and mtm Compact GmbH.

mtm is able to process PO post-consumer plastic waste (also mixed and inferior) and converts around 70,000 tonnes of this raw material annually into recyclates. mtm uses mixed packaging, bulky household and industrial waste as raw materials.

mtm's recyclates are mainly used in injection moulding and extrusion processes. Typical applications: Containers and transport packaging, household goods, products for the building sector or lawn grids.

=== Ecoplast ===
In August 2018, Borealis announced the acquisition of 100% of the shares in Ecoplast Kunststoffrecycling GmbH, an Austrian plastics recycler. Based in Wildon, Austria, Ecoplast processes around 35,000 tonnes of post-consumer plastic waste from households and industrial consumers every year, turning them into LDPE and HDPE recyclates.

=== Rialti S.p.A. ===
In summer 2023, Borealis acquired Rialti S.p.A., a leading European producer of mechanically recycled polypropylene (PP) compounds for injection molding and extrusion, headquartered in Italy. Rialti supplies its products to various sectors, including automotive, household appliances, and construction industries. This acquisition adds 50,000 metric tons of recycled compounding capacity to Borealis' portfolio.

=== Integra Plastics AD ===
In April 2024, Borealis acquired Integra Plastics AD, a player in advanced mechanical recycling based in Bulgaria. Integra Plastics specializes in converting post-consumer waste into polyolefin recyclates.
