= OMV =

Austrian petrochemical company

OMV Aktiengesellschaft
- OMV's logo since June 2024
- Formerly: Österreichische Mineralölverwaltung Aktiengesellschaft (1956–1995)
- Type: Aktiengesellschaft
- Traded as: WBAG: OMV; ATX component
- ISIN: AT0000743059
- Industry: Oil and gas
- Founded: 3 July 1956; 70 years ago
- Headquarters: Vienna, Austria
- Area served: Worldwide
- Key people: Emma Delaney (Chairwoman & CEO), Reinhard Florey (CFO, Deputy Chairman)
- Products: Petroleum, natural gas, motor fuels, lubricants, petrochemicals, plastics
- Services: Fuel stations, EV charging
- Revenue: ▼€24.308 billion (2025)
- Operating income: ▼€3.110 billion (2025)
- Net income: ▼€1.520 billion (2025)
- Total assets: ▼€46.338 billion (2025)
- Total equity: ▼€22.567 billion (2025)
- Owner: ÖBAG (Austrian Government) (31.5%); ADNOC (24.9%); Free float (43.4%)
- Number of employees: 23,000 (2025)
- Subsidiaries: Borealis (75%); Central European Gas Hub (65%); OMV Petrom (51%)
- Website: omv.com

OMV Headquarters in Vienna

OMV, formerly an abbreviation for Österreichische Mineralölverwaltung Aktiengesellschaft (ÖMV) (English: Austrian Mineral Oil Stock Company), is the major integrated oil- and gas company in Austria with business activities, including fuels & feedstock, petrochemicals, and energy.

The company was founded in 1956 and is headquartered in Vienna and trades on the Vienna Stock Exchange.

Today, OMV supports the transition to a lower-carbon economy and has announced plans to achieve zero greenhouse gas emissions (GHS) by 2050 for Scope 1, 2, and 3 emissions, in alignment with the Paris Climate Agreement.

In the 2021 Forbes Global 2000, OMV Group was ranked as the 413th largest public company in the world, in 2025 at rank #526. In June 2024, OMV introduced a new corporate identity. The new OMV brand and corporate design was presented as part of the company's Strategy 2030 and is said to reflect OMV's commitment to innovation, responsible transformation, and global impact.

== History ==
=== Founding and Early Years (1956–1987) ===
OMV Aktiengesellschaft was officially registered on 3 July 1956, succeeding the Soviet Mineral Oil Administration (Sowjetische Mineralölverwaltung, SMV), which had been established in the Soviet occupation zone of post-war Austria. In 1960, the company opened the Schwechat refinery near Vienna, marking its entry into crude oil processing.

In 1968, OMV signed its first natural gas supply contract with the Soviet Union, establishing itself as a key supplier in Central Europe. In 1970, the Adria–Vienna Pipeline (AWP) entered service, creating a crude oil link from the marine terminal at Trieste, Italy to OMV's Schwechat refinery near Vienna. It allows oil supplies to Austria from the Italian oil terminal in Trieste. In May 1974, the Trans‑Austria Gas Pipeline (TAG) natural gas pipeline was commissioned, reinforcing Austria's role as a regional transit corridor.

=== Privatization and Expansion (1987–2004) ===
In 1987, OMV became the first Austrian state-owned enterprise to undergo partial privatization when 15% of shares were offered on the Vienna Stock Exchange. In the same year, OMV expanded its refining operations through the acquisition of the Burghausen refinery in Germany.

In June 1990, OMV opened its first retail filling station in Vienna's Auhof area, marking the beginning of downstream retail expansion. The International Petroleum Investment Company (IPIC) of Abu Dhabi acquired a 19.6% stake in 1994, marking the company's first significant international institutional investor. In 1995, OMV changed its name from "ÖMV" to "OMV" to improve international brand recognition, as the German umlaut was not universally supported. Starting in the early 2000s, OMV pursued a strategy of regional consolidation in Central and Eastern Europe. In 1998, OMV acquired a 25% stake in the plastics group, Borealis.

In 2000, the company acquired approximately 10% of Hungary's MOL Group, and in 2003 OMV acquired the upstream division of Germany's Preussag Energie, significantly expanding its operations. In 2004, OMV completed the acquisition of 51% majority stake in Romanian oil and gas group Petrom for €1.5 billion, at that time the largest transaction in the company's history. The acquisition made OMV the largest oil and gas group in Central Europe, supported by Petrom's substantial upstream and downstream asset base.

=== International Expansion and Strategic Partnerships (2005–2020) ===
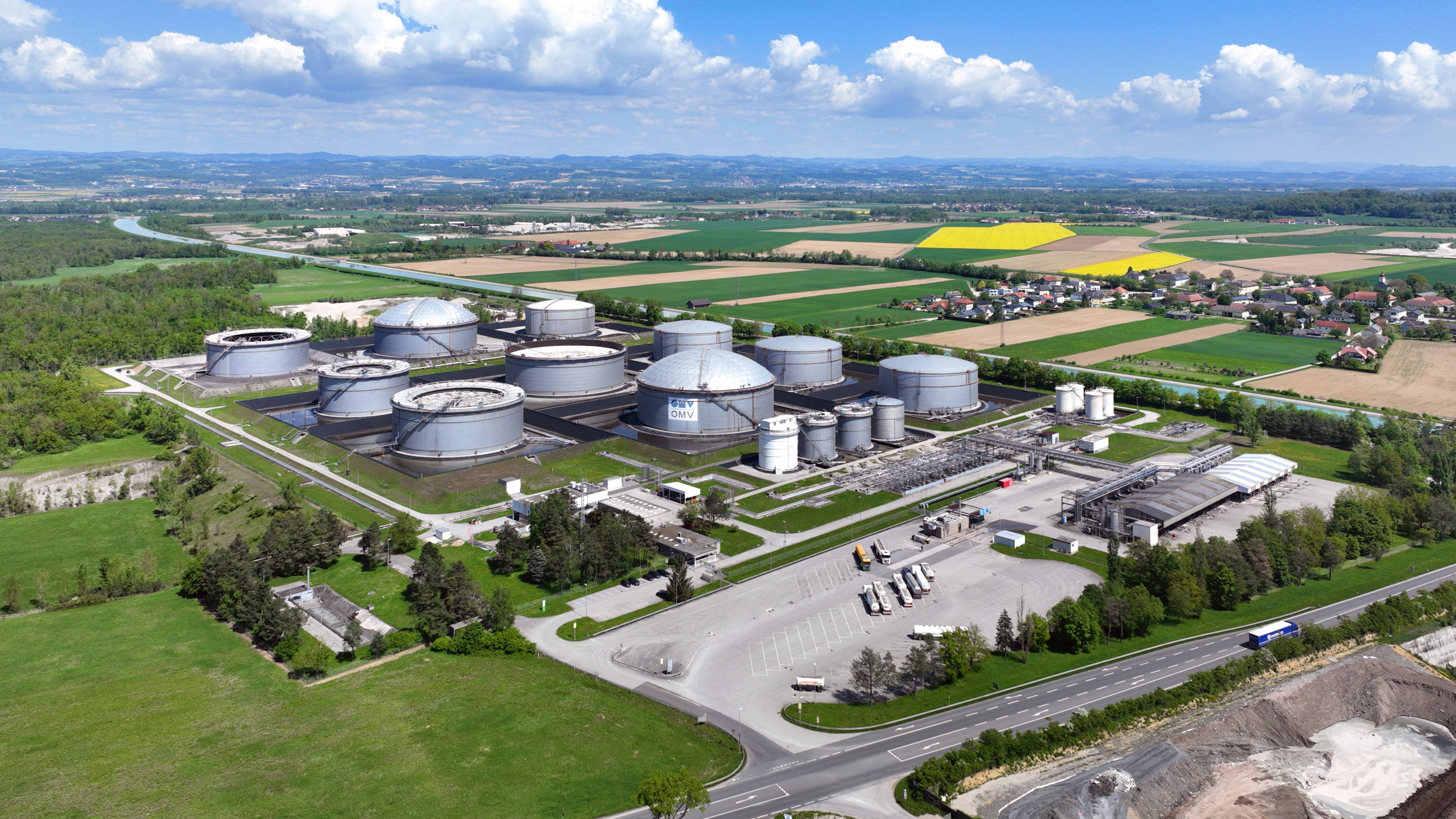
OMV tank farm in St. Valentin; connected to the Lobau tank farm via the West Product Pipeline (PLW) since 1976

In 2005, OMV and the International Petroleum Investment Company (IPIC) jointly acquired full control of the Borealis Group, a leading polyolefin producer, after purchasing out other shareholders. In 2006, OMV purchased a 34% stake in Turkey's Petrol Ofisi, expanding its downstream retail presence in a strategic regional market. Later that year, OMV and Verbund, an Austrian energy company, announced merger discussions. The proposed combination faced opposition from the Austrian Parliament, and negotiations were ultimately abandoned in early 2007. OMV increased its stake in Hungarian oil group MOL to 20.2% in 2006. OMV then sold its entire stake in March 2009 after MOL rejected a takeover bid in 2008 and the European Commission imposed tough restrictions for an approval of the deal. In late 2011, OMV acquired the stake held by Dogan Holding in Petrol Ofisi, which increased its stake in the company to 95.75%.

In 2012, gas was discovered in the Domino-1 well in the Romanian Black Sea (exploration license Neptun), making it OMV's most significant gas discovery in that year. On 31 October 2013, OMV completed a US$2.65 billion acquisition of oil and gas production assets and development projects in Norwegian and United Kingdom waters from Norwegian energy company Statoil. The transaction represented the largest acquisition in OMV's history at that time, significantly expanding the company's North Sea operations. It was announced on December 19, 2013, that OMV signed to sell its stake (45%) in Bayernoil to Varo Energy B.V., pending approvals.The sale was closed in June 2014. In 2015 OMV increased its interest in Petrol Ofisi to 100%. Two years later, in 2017, OMV sold Petrol Ofisi to Vitol Group.

=== Recent Developments (2017–2025) ===
In 2017, OMV, together with ENGIE, Shell, Uniper, and Wintershall, signed financing agreements with Nord Stream 2 AG for the construction of the Nord Stream 2 natural gas pipeline, a 1,200-kilometre offshore pipeline intended to transport natural gas from Russia to Germany. Following Russia's invasion of Ukraine in 2022, OMV suspended its involvement in the project, which remains incomplete as of 2025.

In January 2019, OMV acquired a 50% stake in the Malaysian upstream joint venture SapuraOMV Upstream Sdn. Bhd to Total Energies. In the same month, OMV signed an agreement to acquire a 15% stake in ADNOC Refining in Abu Dhabi.

In March 2020, OMV increased its shareholding in Borealis to 75%, further expanding its chemicals business. At the end of the same year, OMV commissioned Austria's then largest photovoltaic power plant in Schönkirchen, Lower Austria.

On 31 May 2021, Verbund completed the acquisition of a 51% stake in Gas Connect Austria from OMV. On 1 June 2021, Alfred Stern was appointed Chief Executive Officer of OMV. On 8 June 2021, OMV and MOL Group reached an agreement for MOL to acquire OMV Slovenia.

On 5 March 2022, OMV announced that it would no longer pursue investments in Russia. In December 2022, the state-owned Abu Dhabi National Oil Company (ADNOC) acquired a 24.9% stake in OMV from Mubadala Petroleum and Petrochemicals Holding Company. In December 2023, a decree issued by the Russian government enabled the state seizure of oil and gas assets held by several European energy companies, including OMV's joint interests in the Yuzhno-Russkoye oil and gas field. OMV subsequently wrote down the value of its Russian assets and exited its remaining operations in the country.

In September 2023, OMV began rolling out a network of electric-vehicle charging stations under the brand name eMotion in several Central and Eastern European countries (Austria, Romania, Slovakia, Hungary, Czech Republic, and Bulgaria). In November 2023, OMV and Wien Energie established a joint venture to develop deep geothermal energy projects for up to 200,000 households in the greater Vienna area.

In December 2024, OMV terminated its long-term natural gas supply contract with Gazprom Export, citing repeated breaches of contractual obligations. In the same year, it announced the closing of a transaction with TotalEnergies, for the sale of its 50% stake in the Malaysian SapuraOMV Upstream Sdn Bhd. The overall cash consideration was US$957 million.

In March 2025, OMV and ADNOC agreed on the key commercial terms for a combination of their polyolefins businesses. The agreement provides for the merger of OMV's Borealis and ADNOC's Borouge into a jointly controlled company. OMV's production profile is expected to shift from a predominantly European base to a global platform, with around 70% of production located in the Middle East and North America, compared to 60% in Europe previously. In March 2026, OMV and XRG, ADNOC’s international investment arm, announced the formation of Borouge Groupe International AG, to operate under the brand name “Borouge International”. Borouge International has been formed by the combination of Borouge Plc and Borealis, with the new entity acquiring NOVA Chemicals, a North American chemical producer.

In November 2025, OMV AG announced a joint venture with Masdar, the state‑owned renewable energy company of Abu Dhabi, for the development and operation of a green hydrogen electrolyser plant in Bruck an der Leitha, Austria. Under the agreement, the project will be majority-owned by OMV, with Masdar holding a 49% share. The facility is scheduled to start operations in 2027, with a planned electrolysis capacity of 140 megawatts and an annual production of up to 23,000 metric tons of green hydrogen.

In April 2026, Emma Delaney was appointed as CEO and chair of the executive board, starting September 2026.

== Finance information ==
| | 2016 | 2017 | 2018 | 2019 | 2020 | 2021 | 2022 | 2023 | 2024 | 2025 |
|---|---|---|---|---|---|---|---|---|---|---|
| Sales revenue (€ billions) | 19.3 | 20.2 | 22.9 | 23.5 | 16.6 | 35.6 | 62.3 | 39.5 | 26.2 | 24.3 |
| Operating income (€ billions) | −0.03 | 1.7 | 3.5 | 3.6 | 1.1 | 5.1 | 12.2 | 5.2 | 4.2 | 3.1 |
| Net income (€ billions) | −0.4 | 0.4 | 1.4 | 1.7 | 1.3 | 2.1 | 3.6 | 1.5 | 1.4 | 1.0 |
| Total assets (€ billions) | 32.1 | 31.6 | 37.0 | 40.4 | 49.3 | 53.8 | 56.9 | 50.7 | 48.8 | 46.3 |
| Total equity (€ billions) | 13.9 | 14.3 | 15.3 | 16.9 | 19.9 | 22.0 | 26.6 | 25.4 | 24.6 | 22.6 |
| Employees | 22,544 | 20,721 | 20,231 | 19,845 | 25,291 | 22,434 | 22,308 | 20,592 | 23,557 | 22,315 |

Figures refer to the OMV Group. Financial amounts are in billions of euros and rounded to one decimal place, except for the small operating loss in 2016. Net income is attributable to stockholders of the parent; total equity includes non-controlling interests. Total assets, total equity and employee numbers are reported at year-end. Sales revenue excludes petroleum excise tax. For 2024 and 2025, sales revenue and operating income cover continuing operations; the 2024 comparative figures were restated following the classification of the Borealis Group, excluding its Borouge investments, as discontinued operations in 2025. The figures for earlier years have not been adjusted on this basis.

=== Shareholder structure 2025 ===
- ÖBAG (31.5%)
- ADNOC (24.9%)
- Free Float (43.4%)
- Treasury Shares and further (0.2%)

=== Shareholdings ===
The most important shareholdings of OMV Aktiengesellschaft are listed below, with other shareholdings held by the appropriate business segments:

- Borealis AG (75%)
- OMV Petrom SA (51%)
- ADNOC Refining and ADNOC Global Trading (15%)
- Central European Gas Hub (65%)

=== Further Joint Ventures include ===
- project “deeep” with Wien Energie (50%), developing deep geothermal plants in the greater Vienna area.
- Sorting facility for chemical recycling in Walldürn, Germany with Interzero (89.9%)

== Business segments ==
OMV organizes its activities into three business segments: Energy, Fuels and Chemicals.

=== Energy ===
The Energy segment consists of OMV's exploration, development, and production of crude oil and natural gas, focusing on three core regions including North, Central and Eastern Europe, and South. This includes Gas Marketing & Power business and trading, natural gas and power in several European countries and also includes the liquefied natural gas (LNG) business. Furthermore, OMV holds a 65% stake in the Central European Gas Hub (CEGH) and operates natural gas storage facilities with a capacity of around 30 TWh in Austria and Germany, as well as a gas-fired power plant in Romania. Key areas of activity include:

Geothermal energy: OMV's geothermal energy strategy is to establish a strong position in the geothermal energy sector with a target of approximately 1 TWh of net production output by 2030. An example is OMV's cooperation with Wien Energie on the development of deep geothermal energy projects in the Vienna metropolitan area. The joint venture aims to harness geothermal heat to provide locally produced, low-carbon heat for households and industry. The company plans to deliver 200MW of geothermal energy by 2030, as a local, low-carbon alternative to fossil fuels.

Renewable power: OMV's activities in renewable energy include the development and operation of photovoltaic and wind powered assets to supply renewable electricity for internal consumption and selected external applications. These projects focus on photovoltaic development, Power Purchase Agreements, and ownership to integrate renewables into operations and sales, reducing carbon intensity. This approach contributes to reducing the carbon intensity of OMV's overall energy portfolio.

Carbon capture and storage: In 2025, OMV made progress in the implementation of its decarbonization strategy through multiple technology projects. The Carbon Capture Innovation Center (CCIC) started operations with a mobile, solvent-based pilot unit capable of capturing up to 1,000 t of CO₂ annually, validating CC processes like CoolSwingCC® for future scale-up. In June, OMV's cooperation partner Hycamite started up one of Europe's largest methane splitting demonstration plants in Finland, designed to produce up to 2,000 t of low-carbon hydrogen and 6,000 t of advanced carbon allotropes per year. In Norway, OMV was awarded two licenses in 2023 and 2024. The poseidon license, in partnership with Aker BP ASA, could provide injection capacity of more than 5 million tons of CO2 per year. The Iroko license, in partnership with Vår Energi and Lime Petroleum, could provide injection capacity of around 7.5 million tons of CO2 per year.

In March 2025, OMV Petrom and Romgaz announced the spud of first gas production well of the Neptun Deep project. It's the largest offshore gas project in the EU and located in the Romanian sector of the Black Sea. The project targets the Domino and Pelican South gas fields, situated roughly 160 kilometers offshore, where a total of ten production wells is planned. It will deliver 140 kboe/d of gross production (50% OMV Petrom) for an eight- to ten-year plateau period and is on track to start production in 2027.

The segment also includes investments in gas-fired power generation and integrated energy trading operations.

=== Fuels ===
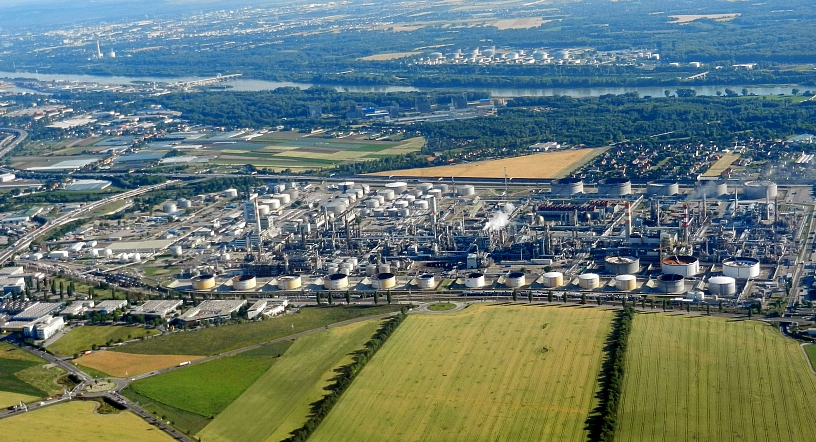
Oil refinery in Schwechat, near Vienna

The Fuels business segment refines crude oil and other feedstocks. Its activities include Refining, Supply and Trading, Commercial, and Retail. OMV owns a total refining capacity of around 500 kbbl/d, with three owned refineries in Europe and a 15% share in ADNOC Refining & ADNOC Global Trading. Total fuels and other sales volumes in Europe amounted to 16.39 mn t in 2025, while commercial customers were mainly from the industrial transportation and construction sectors.

The Fuels segment includes a range of solutions that combine renewable electricity, green hydrogen, and alternative fuels. These activities include the expansion of electric mobility infrastructure, such as electric-vehicle charging networks, as well as large-scale green hydrogen production to support industrial decarbonization and the manufacture of sustainable fuels.

OMV is developing large-scale green hydrogen production as part of its lower-carbon energy activities. A central project is the construction of a 140-megawatt electrolysis plant in Bruck an der Leitha, Lower Austria, which is planned to be one of the largest of its kind in Europe. The facility is designed to produce around 23,000 tonnes of green hydrogen per year by the end of 2027, using electricity from renewable sources.

In addition, OMV is involved in initiatives related to sustainable aviation fuels (SAF). SAF is a renewable alternative to conventional kerosene that contributes to over 80% lower carbon emissions over its lifecycle. OMV is producing SAF at the Schwechat Refinery in Austria since 2022. OMV's goal is to become a leading SAF supplier by 2030, supported by a robust project pipeline. A major milestone is underway with the construction of a large-scale plant at the Petrobrazi refinery in Romania, which began in February 2025. Once operational, this facility will make OMV Petrom the first major producer of renewable fuels in Southeast Europe.

==== Retail ====
OMV operates a retail network of 1,708 filling stations distributed across eight countries in Central and Eastern Europe, including Austria, Bulgaria, the Czech Republic, Hungary, Moldova, Romania, Serbia, and Slovakia.

The OMV brand is positioned as a premium brand, with VIVA representing a strong shop, gastronomy, and service offering, while the unmanned Avanti brand in Austria and the Petrom brand in Romania serve price-sensitive customer groups. OMV is pursuing its electromobility journey as an integrated eMobility provider in Austria, Hungary, Czech Republic, Bulgaria, Romania, and Slovakia. In September 2025, the final investment decision was taken to build a high performance charging network in the Czech Republic together with Pražská energetika (PRE), a leading electric mobility provider in the country. OMV also piloted its first chargers in Bulgaria. By the end of 2025, OMV was operating 1,689 high performance charging points (2024: 804).

=== Chemicals ===
In the Chemicals segment, OMV is one of the world's leading providers of advanced and circular polyolefin solutions, with total polyolefin sales of 6.5 million tonnes in 2025 (2024: 6.3 million tonnes). It also holds a leading position in base chemicals and plastics recycling.

The segment supplies products and services worldwide through OMV and its subsidiary Borealis, as well as through two major joint ventures: Borouge, with ADNOC based in the United Arab Emirates, and Baystar™, with TotalEnergies based in the United States. With operations in over 120 countries, OMV provides for key industries such as Consumer Products, Energy, Health Care, Infrastructure, and Mobility. OMV is expanding its circular and sustainable materials offerings. This includes mechanical recycling and chemical recycling technologies such as the proprietary ReOil® process, which converts hard-to-recycle plastic waste into pyrolysis oil. A large-scale sorting plant to support these recycling efforts is scheduled to begin production in Walldürn, southern Germany, in 2026, in a joint venture with Interzero. =

Further projects and partnerships in bio-based and recycled chemicals include long-term feedstock agreements with TOMRA Feedstock for recycling inputs used in ReOil® and Borealis facilities; and the strategic integration of Borealis and Borouge under Borouge Group International, which enhances capacity for sustainable polyolefin solutions. In addition, biobased polymers marketed as Bornewables™ and industry collaborations such as Borealis’ participation in circular economy platforms supports these efforts.

== Controversies ==
=== War crimes in Sudan ===
In June 2010, the European Coalition on Oil in Sudan (ECOS) published the report "Unpaid Debt", that called upon the governments of Sweden, Austria, and Malaysia to look into allegations Lundin Petroleum (as operator), OMV and Petronas may have been complicit in the commission of war crimes and crimes against humanity whilst operating in Block 5A, South Sudan (then Sudan), during the period of 1997 to 2003. The reported crimes include indiscriminate attacks and intentional targeting of civilians, burning of shelters, pillage, destruction of objects necessary for survival, unlawful killing of civilians, rape of women, abduction of children, torture, and forced displacement by government troops. When the consortium that OMV took part in operated in Block 5A, approximately 12.000 people died and 160.000 were violently displaced by government troops from their land and homes, many forever. Satellite pictures taken between 1994 and 2003 show that the activities coincided with a spectacular drop in agricultural land use in its concession area.

In June 2010, the Swedish public prosecutor for international crimes opened a criminal investigation into links between Sweden and the reported crimes. In 2016, Lundin Petroleum's Chairman Ian Lundin and CEO Alex Schneiter (as operator) were informed that they were the suspects of the investigation. Sweden's Government gave the green light for the Public Prosecutor in October 2018 to indict the two top executives On 1 November 2018, the Swedish Prosecution Authority notified Lundin Petroleum AB that the company may be liable to a corporate fine and forfeiture of economic benefits of SEK 3,285 (app. €315 million) for involvement in war crimes and crimes against humanity. Consequently, the company itself would also be charged, albeit indirectly, and will be legally represented in court. On 15 November 2018 the suspects were served with the draft charges and the case files. They would be indicted for aiding and abetting international crimes and may face life imprisonment if found guilty. The trial is likely to open early in 2022 and may take two years.

The Swedish war crimes investigation raises the issue of access to remedy and reparation for victims of human rights violations linked with business activities. In May 2016, representatives of communities in Block 5A claimed their right to remedy and reparation and called upon OMV, Lundin Petroleum and Petronas and their shareholders to pay off their debt to them. A conviction in Sweden may provide some level of remedy and reparation for the few victims of human rights violations who will testify in court, but not for the other 200,000 victims who will not be represented in court. The Swedish court cannot impose obligations upon OMV.

On 23 May 2019, the T.M.C. Asser Institute for International Law in The Hague organized the conference 'Towards criminal liability of corporations for human rights violations: The Lundin case in Sweden'.

OMV endorses the UN Guiding Principles on Business and Human Rights, acknowledging the duty of business enterprises to contribute to effective remedy of adverse impact that it has caused or contributed to. The company has never publicly showed an interest in the adverse impacts of its activities on the communities in its concession area. According to the Dutch peace organisation PAX, the companies OMV, Lundin Petroleum, Petronas, as well as their shareholders are disregarding the human rights standards that they claim to respect, notably the OECD Guidelines and UN Guiding Principles, because they, A. never conducted an appropriate due diligence for their Sudanese operations; B. made no effort to know their human rights impacts; and C. do not show how they address alleged adverse human rights impacts.

OMV (Sudan) Exploration GmbH was a wholly owned subsidiary of OMV AG, and held a 26.1% share in the a license as part of the consortium that appointed Lundin as operator to explore and develop oil deposits in Block 5A. It sold its Sudanese assets in 2004 with a net profit of $55 million. As the operator of the consortium, Lundin Petroleum was responsible for day-to-day management but its managers stood under the supervision of the Operating Committee, that exercised "overall direction and control of all matters pertaining to the Joint Operations and the Joint Property". OMV was permanently represented in the Operating Committee and has never publicly distanced itself from any of its decisions.

Between 2001 and 2003, OMV met repeatedly with European human rights advocates led by Sudan Platform Austria, but the company took no effective measures to prevent involvement in human rights violations or undo the adverse impact of Lundin's operations. On 6 April 2001, OMV wrote to Human Rights Watch: "We have reached the conclusion that, despite problems, the influx of oil revenues could improve the social and humanitarian conditions of the Sudanese. Oil exploration activities also represent immediate benefits to the local population, in terms of employment, infrastructure developments and humanitarian assistance... Our role is to constantly monitor the situation on the ground and to turn our perception of business ethics into reality by responsible action. In 2002, OMV nevertheless commissioned an independent report on the human rights situation in Block 5A, that has not been made public.

While Block 5A was operated by Lundin, OMV was a participant in the consortium, the suspicions against the consortium's top managers therefore also concern OMV. The Austrian State's owns 31% of OMV's shares. According to the UN Guiding Principles, which is endorsed by Austria, an abuse of human rights by a business enterprise that is wholly or partially controlled by a State, may entail a violation of that State's own international law obligations.

=== Petrom ===
The acquisition of 51% stake in Petrom was considered controversial as the privatisation contract was not made public and it consists of several disputed clauses.

The privatisation allegedly produced a market monopoly. Critics say that OMV can use the resources Petrom owns until their exhaustion. Also fixing of tax for gas and oil exploration at 3 to 13.5 percent from the final delivery price for 10 years was criticised. Some critics claimed, that the price €1.5 billion was too low.

On 13 December 2022, OMV Petrom was convicted by the Couter of Justice from Gaiesti, Romania of Involuntary manslaughter case. The Local Court Gaiesti ruled its decision in the file where OMV Petrom SA was sent to trial for involuntary manslaughter. The accusation is referring to an incident which occurred in Cobia in 2016 and resulted in the death of a child. OMV Petrom was found guilty and was convicted to a punishment of a criminal fine amounting to RON 28,000. On the civil side, the court assessed the degree of fault of OMV Petrom SA at 50% and the company was obliged to pay moral damages in total amount of EUR 135,000 to the victim's family and material damages and other expenses in total amount of RON 22,000. The court ordered the complementary measure consisting in the one-year suspension of the activity of oil exploitation wells within the radius of Dâmboviţa county which, at the date when the decision becomes final, do not have a completely closed and locked perimeter or which do no have a well cellar grate installed. The court also ordered the publication of the decision of conviction, in extract.

=== MOL ===
In June 2007 OMV made an unsolicited bid to take over MOL, which was rejected by the Hungarian company. MOL criticised OMV's advertisement in which OMV had suggested the two had already worked together on the European market. MOL thought that to be misleading and unethical and asked OMV to remove the name MOL from those advertisements. OMV dismissed its bid after negative results of the investigation by the European competition authorities. OMV sold its entire stake to Surgutneftegas in March 2009.

=== New Zealand ===
On 10 April 2019 OMV announced that it would drill up to ten wells off the Otago, New Zealand coast. The decision was met with indications by local environmental groups, who had successfully fought previous attempts to drill for fossil fuels in the area, that OMV could "expect resistance". In November 2019 an OMV supply vessel in Timaru was occupied for 57 hours by 27 protesters, and 16 people were arrested. In March 2020 two members of Extinction Rebellion Ōtautahi intercepted and boarded an OMV mobile drilling rig in the Marlborough Sounds from an inflatable boat, intending to occupy it for a week, but due to sickness of one of the protestors, the occupation was abandoned after 14 hours. The protestors came on board of the rig and were flown to New Plymouth and served with a trespass notice.

== See also ==
- EU energy law
- List of petroleum companies
- OMV Petrom
- Petrol Ofisi
