= ADNOC Distribution =

Mobility retailer

- Native name: شركة بترول أبوظبي الوطنية للتوزيع
- Type: Public
- Traded as: ADX:ADNOCDIST
- ISIN: AEA006101017
- Industry: Oil & Gas
- Founded: June 1, 1973; 53 years ago in Abu Dhabi, United Arab Emirates
- Headquarters: Abu Dhabi, United Arab Emirates
- Number of locations: 1,081 service stations (2026)
- Area served: United Arab Emirates, Saudi Arabia, Egypt
- Key people: Sultan Al Jaber (Chairman); Bader Al Lamki (CEO); Ali Siddiqi (CFO); Klaas Mantel (COO)
- Products: Fuel distribution Retail
- Brands: Oasis; The Hub; Voyager; E2GO; AUTOSERV
- Services: Automotive maintenance; Car washes; Convenience stores; Electric vehicle charging; Fuel retailing
- Revenue: AED 35.9 billion (2025)
- Operating income: AED 4.28 billion (2025)
- Net income: AED 2.85 billion (2025)
- Total assets: AED 17.68 billion (2025)
- Total equity: AED 3.46 billion (2025)
- Number of employees: ~14,000 (2026)
- Parent: Abu Dhabi National Oil Company
- Divisions: Aviation; Commercial; Lubricants; Retail
- Subsidiaries: ADNOC Distribution Egypt Holding RSC Limited; ADNOC Distribution Global Company L.L.C.; ADNOC Distribution Saudi Arabia; TotalEnergies Marketing Egypt LLC (50%)
- Website: adnocdistribution.ae

ADNOC Distribution is a petroleum retailer, founded in 1973 and headquartered in Abu Dhabi, United Arab Emirates (UAE).

Specializing in the distribution and marketing of fuel products, the company offers a variety of services and products at its service stations, including gasoline, convenience store items, car wash services, car care services, vehicle inspection services, oil change services, and property leasing and management.

ADNOC Distribution's fuel station network also includes ADNOC Oasis, a chain of over 400 convenience stores, providing a variety of food, beverage, and convenience items.

Abu Dhabi National Oil Company (ADNOC) is the parent company and the largest shareholder of ADNOC Distribution. As of August 2024, ADNOC Distribution is the largest fuel and convenience retailer in the UAE.

== History ==
ADNOC Distribution was established by a royal decree, becoming the UAE's first state-owned enterprise specializing in the marketing and distribution of fuel products within the UAE and abroad. In 1979, ADNOC Distribution expanded its operations by establishing a lubricant blending and packaging facility in Sas Al Nakhl, Abu Dhabi.

In 2013, ADNOC Distribution acquired 75 service stations from Emarat in the Northern Emirates of the UAE. The following year, the company took over 25 service stations in Sharjah, previously operated by Emirates National Oil Company (ENOC).

In April 2017, ADNOC and Saudi Aramco signed a foundational Memorandum of Understanding (MoU) to strengthen bilateral energy cooperation between the United Arab Emirates and Saudi Arabia. The agreement established a framework for sharing technical knowledge, improving operational efficiency, and identifying joint investment opportunities across the oil and gas value chain. By encouraging closer alignment between the two energy sectors, this partnership also helped create a supportive commercial environment for cross-border expansion, preceding ADNOC Distribution's entry into the Saudi Arabian retail fuel market in late 2018.

On 13 December 2017, ADNOC Distribution was listed on the Abu Dhabi Stock Exchange (ADX) under the symbol ADNOCDIST. The initial public offering (IPO) was priced at AED 2.50 per share, with the company selling 1.25 billion shares, representing 10% of its share capital. In May 2021, ADNOC Distribution announced that it was included in the Morgan Stanley Capital International (MSCI) Emerging Markets Index.

In December 2018, ADNOC Distribution inaugurated its first service station in Saudi Arabia on the Riyadh-Dammam highway, approximately 40 kilometers from Riyadh. This was soon followed by the opening of a second station in Hofuf, located within the Al Ahsa Governorate. In December 2020, ADNOC Distribution entered into an agreement to acquire 15 additional service stations in Saudi Arabia for a total purchase price of AED 36.7 million (US$10 million).

The same year, the company acquired a 50% stake in TotalEnergies’ network in Egypt, which included over 240 service stations, over 250 lube changing stations, car washes, lubricants, wholesale, and aviation fuel operations. Subsequently, in 2023, nine ADNOC-branded service stations were launched across the country.

In June 2023, ADNOC Distribution also entered an agreement with India's Hindustan Petroleum Corporation Limited (HPCL) to expand their respective lubricants and products businesses in the UAE, India. The same year, ADNOC Distribution launched the ADNOC Mobile Vehicle Inspection Centre in Abu Dhabi in collaboration with the Abu Dhabi Police.

The same year, the company acquired a 50% stake in TotalEnergies’ network in Egypt, which included more than 240 service stations. Subsequently, in 2023, nine ADNOC-branded service stations were launched across the country.

In April 2024, ADNOC Distribution entered into a strategic agreement with AD Ports Group to globally distribute marine lubricants.

The same month, ADNOC Distribution collaborated with Magnati, a Middle Eastern payments provider, to implement new single-device point-of-sale terminals in ADNOC Oasis stores.

In August 2024, ADNOC Distribution announced plans to start blending ADNOC Voyager lubricants in Egypt, as a regional export hub. Manufacturing began in December 2024, and the official launch occurred in May 2025.

ADNOC Distribution opened the worlds sixth largest superfast EV charging hub on the E11 motorway in January 2026. The Saih Shuaib EV charging station is made up of 60 high-speed charging points.

In March 2026, the ADNOC shut down the Ruwais refinery temporarily due to the drone attacks which caused a fire in the industrial complex on 10 March. The drone attacks caused interruptions in crude loading operations at the port of Fujairah in the UAE, forcing ADNOC to stop operations at its crude-export terminal. Additional drone attacks on 16 March 2026, forced the ADNOC Sour Gas Shah gas plant to suspend operations.

In July 2026, ADNOC Distribution acquired Shell Downstream South Africa for $1 billion. The agreement which included all 580 service stations, the associated lubricant and fuel businesses was intended to be complete in 2027.

== Operations ==
ADNOC Distribution operates in two primary segments: fuel and non-fuel retail. The company's services encompass fuel retail, aviation fueling, car services, lubricants, and convenience stores. Additionally, ADNOC Distribution manages and leases retail space within its service stations.

An ADNOC Service Station (2014)

These spaces are leased to tenants including restaurants, banks, and automobile insurance providers. The company's tenant portfolio includes over 1,000 properties, with brands such as KFC, Popeyes, McDonald's, Starbucks, Pizza Hut and Hardee's among its lessees.

The company has a presence in the UAE, Saudi Arabia, and Egypt, having acquired stations from Emarat, ENOC, and TotalEnergies. As of 2024, ADNOC Distribution operates over 800 service stations across these regions and has expanded its electric vehicle (EV) charging network to more than 100 points. The company also opened a pioneering Mobility Hub with fast and superfast charging points, leading to double the number of charging points in 2024.

In 2026, ADNOC Distribution operated 1,045 service stations across the UAE, Saudi Arabia and Egypt.

=== AI initiatives ===
ADNOC Distribution has integrated artificial intelligence (AI) and digital technology into its services, including Fill & Go, Click & Collect, car wash tunnels, and automated checkout counters.

==== Fill & Go ====
Users refuel their cars without manually initiating the transaction at the pump through pre-registered information in the ADNOC Distribution app. The model is projected to prevent lost sales, totaling to over $27 million, in five years.

==== Click & Collect ====
Through the ADNOC Distribution mobile app, users can pre-order food and beverage items from Oasis convenience stores to be delivered directly to the user's vehicle upon arrival at the participating station.

==== Next-generation car wash tunnel ====
An eco-friendly car wash solution that uses 80% recycled water. The automated tunnel accommodates up to four cars simultaneously, with each wash taking approximately 7–8 minutes to complete.

==== Automated checkout ====
A self-checkout program that uses computer vision technology to identify items placed on the counter automatically.

==== Robotic arm refueling ====
ADNOC Distribution is also developing a robotic fueling system that uses artificial intelligence and computer vision to automate refueling. This system uses pre-registered information from the ADNOC Distribution app for refueling. In October 2024, the company also revealed an autonomous EV charging robotic arm, in progress of being launched.

In August 2024, ADNOC Distribution announced the process of 20 AI-powered projects being developed for company efficiencies.

== Financial performance ==
For the first nine months of 2024, ADNOC Distribution reported an EBITDA of US$790 million and a net profit of US$501 million.

The net profit increase was estimated at US$187 million, excluding UAE corporate tax. The company's free cash flow in H1 2024 stood at US$488 million, with an expected US$350 million dividend. ADNOC Distribution also reported a US$10 million like-for-like OPEX savings and an allocation of US$250 million to US$300 million in CAPEX, with 70% of the investment directed towards developing growth strategies.

In March 2024, the ADNOC Distribution Board approved a five-year dividend policy that sets an annual dividend of US$700 million (20.57 fils per share), or a minimum of 75% of net profit, whichever is higher, in the Annual General Meeting.

In June 2024, ADNOC confirmed that it has redeemed in full its US dollar-denominated senior unsecured bonds (exchangeable bonds) in ADNOC Distribution.

== Corporate structure section ==
In May 2021, ADNOC Distribution announced the appointment of Eng. Bader Saeed Al Lamki as the company's Chief Executive Officer (CEO).

In May 2022, ADNOC Distribution announced Wayne Beifus as the Chief Financial Officer (CFO). In December 2024, Wayne Beifus stepped down, and Ali Siddiqi was appointed Acting CFO.

In September 2023, Klaas Mantel joined ADNOC Distribution as Chief Operating Officer. He previously worked for over 25 years in the energy industry, including senior roles at Shell and McKinsey & Company.

=== Management ===
The Board of Directors consists of H.E. Dr. Sultan Ahmed Al Jaber, H.E. Ahmed Jassim AlZaabi, Khaled Salmeen, Khaled Alalkeem Al Zaabi, Marwan Naim Nijmeh, Saif Al Falahi and Paula Disberry.

Major shareholders of ADNOC Distribution include Emirate of Abu Dhabi, Pictet Asset Management, Sjunde AP-fonden, State Street Global Advisors, Mercer Global Investments Europe, ADCB Asset Management, William Blair International, Evli Fund Management Co, KLP Kapitalforvaltning AS, and Goldman Sachs Asset Management BV.

== ESG activities ==
In 2021, ADNOC Distribution expanded its LPG delivery service with 30 new trucks in Abu Dhabi. The ADNOC Distribution app allows customers to order LPG cylinders, track their delivery, and redeem ADNOC Rewards points with every purchase.

The following year, in March 2022, the company opened a dedicated CNG refueling station in Abu Dhabi. The company also launched the ADNOC Voyager Green Series, featuring plant-based lubricants for gasoline and diesel engines. Furthermore, ADNOC Distribution established a mobility joint venture, E2GO, with TAQA Group to develop and operate electric vehicle infrastructure in the UAE.

In January 2023, ADNOC Distribution announced a decarbonization roadmap to reduce greenhouse gas emissions intensity by 25% by 2030. ADNOC Distribution also implemented sustainable financing, becoming the first UAE fuel and convenience retailer to convert an existing US$1.5 billion (AED 5.5 billion) term loan into a sustainability-linked loan. The company also installed rooftop solar PV panels across its service stations as part of the decarbonization plan.

At the same year, in partnership with Masdar, ADNOC Distribution launched “H2GO,” the region's first high-speed green hydrogen refueling station, to test hydrogen fuel-powered vehicles.

In 2021, ADNOC Distribution marked the International Day of Charity by supporting Al Ghadeer UAE Crafts, offering store space to showcase handmade items by local craftswomen.

== See also ==
- Abu Dhabi National Oil Company
- ADNOC Gas Processing
- ADNOC Headquarters
