= David Heard =

English oil executive

David Heard CBE (14 April 1939 – 18 October 2024) was an English oil executive, the representative of the Abu Dhabi Petroleum Company (ADPC) to the government of Abu Dhabi in the United Arab Emirates, an advisor to the Abu Dhabi Supreme Petroleum Council (SPC) and an author of books charting the history of the oil industry in the Emirates.

== Early years ==
Heard was born in Highgate, north London and attended Monkton Combe School in Bath before obtaining his degree in Geology and Physics from Keele University. Seeking adventure, he responded to an advertisement in The Times to work for an oil company. Heard turned down an offer to work in Kirkuk in 1963, opting instead for a role with the Abu Dhabi Petroleum Company that involved travelling to Abu Dhabi, described to him as “a rough place for tough people”. He oversaw early oil production from the Asab and Sahil fields, staying in remote desert camps and travelling in basic conditions and an extreme environment.

In 1966, Heard was offered the opportunity to move to the fledgling oil town of Abu Dhabi, where he would have a seafront company bungalow. A year later, he married Frauke Bey, a German student he had met in 1958 when she was working at a seaside guesthouse in Bournemouth and she travelled to Abu Dhabi to join him.

== Abu Dhabi Petroleum Company ==
In 1971 the government of Abu Dhabi partially nationalised the Abu Dhabi Petroleum Company and Heard took on the role of liaising between the international investors - western oil companies who retained 40 per cent of ADPC's shares - and the UAE government.

In 1991 Heard was awarded the Order of the British Empire (OBE) by Queen Elizabeth for services to the British community in Abu Dhabi, and in 1999 was appointed Commander of the Order of the British Empire (CBE) for services to relations between the UAE and UK.

Following his 2005 retirement, Heard joined the Abu Dhabi Supreme Petroleum Council as an advisor. A member of the Travellers Club, Chatham House and the Royal Society for Asian Affairs, he was also a Fellow of the Energy Institute.

Heard had been asked in 1995 by his friend, the UAE's first minister of foreign affairs Ahmed bin Khalifa Al Suwaidi, to record the history of the oil industry in the country based on the ADPC London archives and, in 2011, he stepped down from his role at the Petroleum Council to undertake research for his account, writing From Pearls to Oil, the first of his five books on the history of the industry.

== Personal life ==
David Heard and Frauke Heard-Bey, herself an archivist, researcher and prominent historian, had three children; Miriam, Theresa and Nicolas. Undergoing treatment for a rare form of cancer in 2024 in Munich, he gave a talk at the launch of his fifth volume on the history of the petrochemical industry in the Emirates - the History of the Oil Industry in the Gulf and the People Who Made it Happen, 1934-1966 - two weeks before he died. The couple had previously donated their archive of research material to New York University Abu Dhabi.
