= Frauke =

Frauke is a feminine German given name. Notable people with the name include:

- Frauke Brosius-Gersdorf (born 1971), German legal scientist and university professor of public law
- Frauke Dirickx (born 1980), Belgian volleyball player
- Frauke Eickhoff (born 1967), German judoka
- Frauke Eigen (born 1969), German photographer and artist
- Frauke Finsterwalder (born 1975), German film director and screenwriter
- Frauke Heard-Bey, German historian, political scientist, author and researcher
- Frauke Liebs (1985–2006), German murder victim
- Frauke Petry (born 1975), German chemist, businesswoman and politician
- Frauke Schmitt Gran, German orienteer
- Frauke Sonderegger, Swiss orienteer
