= Par Pacific Holdings =

American oil and gas exploration and production company

Par Pacific Holdings, Inc.
- Company type: Public
- Traded as: AMEX: PARR; S&P 600 component
- Industry: Oil and gas
- Predecessor: Delta Petroleum Corporation
- Headquarters: Houston, Texas, U.S.
- Key people: William Monteleone (President & CEO)
- Products: Oil, natural gas, petroleum
- Revenue: ▼US$ 1.865 billion (2016)
- Operating income: ▼US$-16.494 million (2016)
- Net income: ▼US$-45.835 million (2016)
- Total assets: ▼US$ 403.108 million (2016)
- Number of employees: 863
- Website: parpacific.com

Par Pacific Holdings is a Houston-based American oil and gas exploration and production company. Known as Par Petroleum Corporation after it emerged from bankruptcy, it was renamed Par Pacific Holdings on October 20, 2015. As of 2017 it was a Fortune 1000 corporation.

Par Pacific Holdings, Inc., a company whose headquarters are in Houston, Texas, owns operations in oil and production and midstream operations. Par Pacific owns the largest operating refinery in Hawaii which has a 94,000-bpd capacity, this distributes to 90 proprietary and additional independent retail locations under the Hele and 76 brands. In Wyoming, Par Pacific owns a refinery and pipelines which bring crude oil and distributes refined products. Par Pacific also owns 42.3% of Laramie Energy, LLC which has natural gas operations and assets concentrated in the Piceance Basin in Western Colorado.

In January 2024, Par Pacific's refineries in Washington and Wyoming received ENERGY STAR certification from the Environmental Protection Agency (EPA). These are the first ENERGY STAR certifications for both refineries. Par Pacific's Washington refinery achieved the lowest carbon intensity of any refinery in the world, according to the Solomon Energy Intensity Index.

Will Monteleone will succeed William Pate as CEO at the 2024 annual general meeting. Monteleone will also become President of the company, a decision that has already been approved. Both executives will continue to serve as members of the board of directors.

== Hawaii operations ==
On 19 December 2018, Par Pacific completed the $45 million sale from Island Energy Services (IES) of the 94,000-b/sd crude and vacuum distillation refinery (Note: The 94,000-b/sd Par East refinery at Kapolei can run crude with higher sulfur content.) known as Par East at the Campbell Industrial Park in Kapolei, Hawaii, and existing stocks of petroleum products. (Note: Established in 2016, Island Energy Services LLC completed its purchase of the refinery at Kapolei from Chevron on 2 November 2016.) The Par East refinery at Kapolei is operated by Par Hawaii Refining, Inc., which is led by president Jimmy Yates and is a subsidiary of Par Pacific. Par Pacific expected to hire 20 additional employees along with 65 IES workers. IES will continue to own and maintain the Kapolei offshore mooring terminal and provide logistical support of petroleum products to Hawaii Electric Light Co., Maui Electric Co., Hawaiian Electric Co., and Kauai Island Utility Cooperative. According to IES CEO Jon Mauer in 2018, IES will continue to supply petroleum products to its existing 56 Texaco-branded stations from its current network of local and global suppliers and will bring on line additional stations including a new one in Kapolei.

During 2018, approximately eight cargoes of Minas crude from Riau in Sumatra, Indonesia were shipped to Hawaii through third parties on term offtake agreements with Indonesia's Pertamina or field operator PT Chevron Pacific Indonesia (CPI), but the shipments from Indonesia to the Kapolei Refinery were terminated under Par Pacific in 2019. (Note: In 2017, Crude oil for the Kapolei Refinery was mostly sourced from North America, Asia, Africa and the Middle East, with Asia making up 23.1% and the Middle East 28.1% of the feedstock including the UAE’s Murban crude and Russia's Far East ESPO and Sokol crude. Sakhalin Island has three offshore projects Sakhalin-1, Sakhlin-2, Sakhalin 3 and Sokol crude, known as Russian Grade 4 Sokol, is from Sakhalin-1 which is managed by ExxonMobil. Sokol means falcon in Russian. As of September 2021, ESPO crude, which is known as Russian Grade 6 ESPO, is from the Eastern Siberia–Pacific Ocean oil pipeline (ESPO pipeline or ESPOOP, Russian: Нефтепровод "Восточная Сибирь - Тихий океан" (ВСТО)), is linked to UAE - Dubai Crude prices and competes with Alaskan Oil, is usually carried on Aframax or Suezmax class tankers with cargoes of 740,000 barrels or 1 million barrels which are smaller tankers as opposed to the Very Large Crude Carriers with capacities of 2 million barrels.)

In March 2022, the Kapolei Refinery (Note: Due to meeting Hawaii's transition to a renewable energy future, the Par East refinery at Kapolei has been the only refinery in Hawaii since the 2014 closure by the Hawaii governor’s Hawaii Refinery Task Force of the only other refinery in Hawaii which had a 54,000-b/sd capacity and was located in the Campbell Industrial Park at Kapolei, West Oahu.) received about a quarter of its crude from Russia's Far East. Following the 8 March 2022 announcement by President Biden of a ban of Russian oil, liquified natural gas, and coal imported into the United States due to the invasion of Ukraine, Par Pacific announced that it would obtain non-Russian sources for its West Oahu oil refinery. (Note: In 2021, the United States imported 3% of its total oil consumption from Russia which was nearly 700,000 barrels per day of crude oil and refined petroleum products. To help offset the loss of the imported oil from Russia, the United States released 90 million barrels from its Strategic Petroleum Reserve which can replace the loss of imported Russian oil for over 4 months until other sources are acquired.) Between August and December 2021, the refinery received one shipment of approximately 700,000 barrels from the Russian Far East. (Note: On 17 August 2021, the Seoul, South Korea based SK SHIPPING's the 2009 built B. SKY docked at Honolulu Harbor. On 9 October 2018, SK Holdings of the SK Group completed its sale of its SK Shipping, which was its only shipping company, to the Scott Sang-Won Hahn led Hahn & Company.) To replace the Russian sources, Par Pacific announced that it would source from North America and South America.
