= Al Dhannah =

Al Dhannah الظنة (in Arabic)
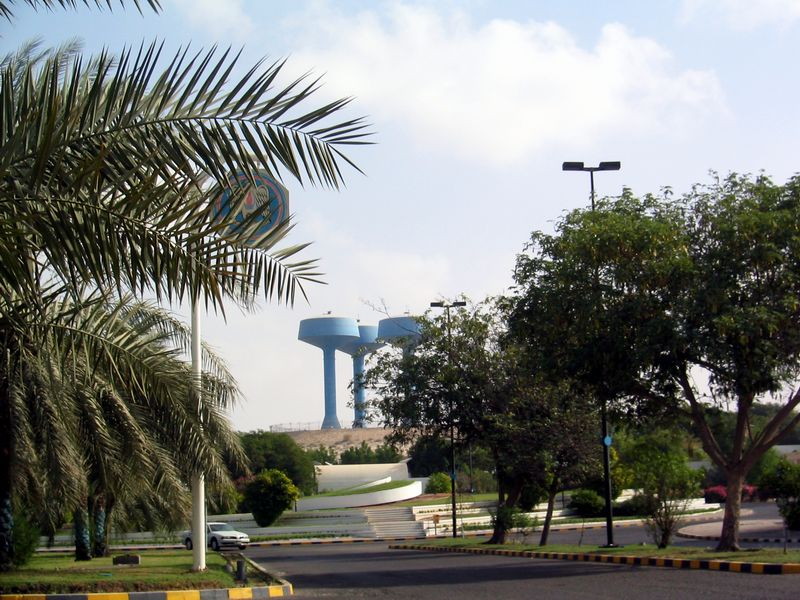
- Al Dhannah with its trio of blue water towers
- Motto: A city of life, leisure, and opportunities.
- Location in United Arab Emirates
- Coordinates: 24°6′12″N 52°35′1″E
- Country: United Arab Emirates
- Emirate: Emirate of Abu Dhabi
- Municipal Region: Al Dhafra
- Founded: 1970

Government
  - Type: Islamic absolute monarchy within a federation
  - Ruler: Mohamed bin Zayed Al Nahyan
  - Crown Prince: Khaled bin Mohamed Al Nahyan
  - Regional Representative: Hamdan bin Zayed bin Sultan Al Nahyan

Population (2020)
  - Total: 38,740
- Time zone: UTC+4
- Website: Al Dhannah City

Al Dhannah (Arabic: الظنة) is a city located 240 km (150 mi) west of Abu Dhabi City, in the Western Region of the Emirate of Abu Dhabi. The city’s former name, "Al Ruwais", is largely dropped in relation to the Ruwais Refinery and other industrial development.

The Al Dhannah/Ruwais industrial and housing complex has been developed by ADNOC as a major contributor to the national economy and represents a series of multimillion-dollar investments by the company. Once a small fishing headland from which a handful of people scratched a seasonal living, Al Dhannah today is one of the most modern industrial complexes in the Middle East.

== History ==
In the 1970s, plans were laid to transform a remote desert site into a self-contained industrial town, geared to fulfilling the downstream requirements of Abu Dhabi's booming oil and gas industry. Centered on Takreer's Ruwais Refinery, the complex was officially inaugurated in 1982 by Sheikh Zayed bin Sultan Al Nahyan, the late President of the UAE and Ruler of Abu Dhabi, and the visionary behind Abu Dhabi's remarkable development and prosperity.

In addition to the original 120,000 barrels (19,000 m^{3})-per-day refinery, which was expanded in 1985 with the commissioning of a 27,000 bbl/d (4,300 m^{3}/d) hydro cracker complex, major facilities at Ruwais include a natural gas liquids fractionation plant operated by Abu Dhabi Gas Industries Ltd (GASCO), a fertilizer plant run by Ruwais Fertilizer Industries (FERTIL), a Petrochemical Complex by Abu Dhabi National Polymers Company (Borouge), a marine terminal and a sulfur handling terminal.

Ruwais has also been developed into a model 'new town' with an evolving population. The Ruwais Housing Complex, covering an area of 6 square kilometres (2.3 square miles), is located 10 kilometres (6.2 miles) away from the industrial plants. The complex has its own shops, schools, banks, mosques, clinic and hospital, and a wide range of sporting and leisure amenities including a beach club and an 'in-house' TV station. Although originally designed to house the workers who support the oil and gas industry, Ruwais has grown to include other government workers of nearby projects, such as Barakah Nuclear Power Plant.

== Infrastructure ==
The Infrastructure of Al Dhannah is largely designed by Stantec. ADNOC, in 2018, initially planned to double the population of the city by investing Dh165 billion to develop the world’s largest integrated refining and petrochemicals complex in Al Dhannah.

Then, as part of its 2030 Al Gharbia Plan, Stantec planned to accommodate an additional 115,000 people on the region. The planning process included “expert input on desert ecology, coastal geomorphology, local and regional natural history and culture, desert landscape architecture and sustainability as well as climate and microclimatic design.”

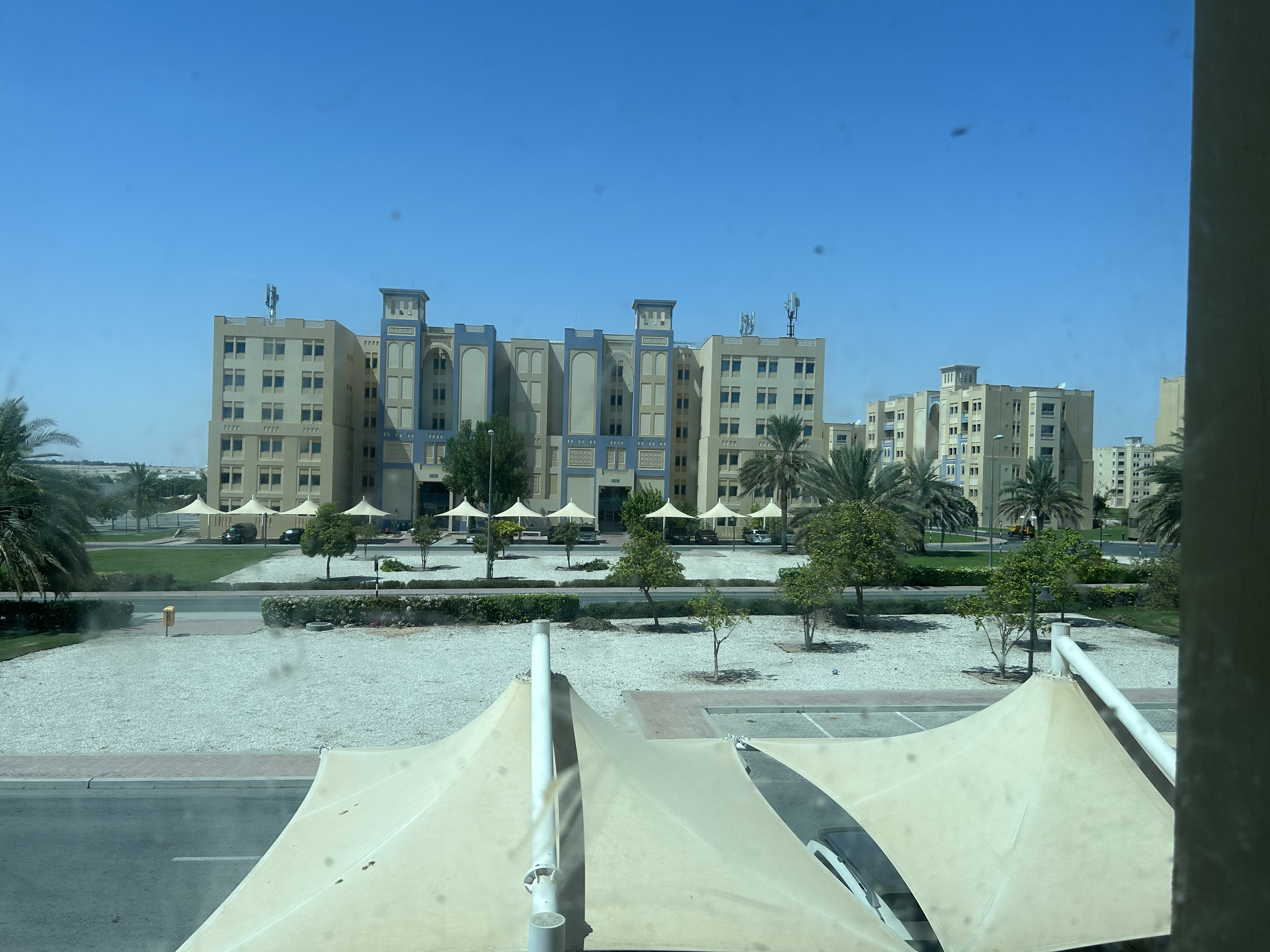
Al Dhannah Residential Buildings

=== Al Dhannah Mall ===
Th former Ruwais Mall was inaugurated in 2014, and features a hypermarket, several well-known family fashion brands and accessories outlets, alongside specialized stores, a food court, and numerous banks.

=== Parks ===
There are two major parks in the city: the Ruwais Central Park (which won the Green Flag Award) and the Al Dhannah 2 Park. Both locations are equipped with playgrounds, community fountains, mosques, barbeque pits, sports courts, gym equipment and gathering spaces.

=== Health Clubs & Sports ===
Al Dhannah offers a wide array of health, sports, and recreational services aimed at their residents, with female only designated spaces also available.

=== Transportation ===
A the city has an integrated internal bus network alongside buses that run from Al Dhannah to Abu Dhabi.

On January 25, 2024, Etihad Rail announced that it completed its first rail journey between Abu Dhabi and Al Dhannah with Sultan Ahmed Al Jaber, UAE Minister of Industry and Advanced Technology.

== Health ==
=== Al Dhannah Hospital ===
A purpose-built local, modern general hospital opened in 2012 to cater for medical, clinical and dental needs of residents. The hospital is administered by the Medical Services Division of the Administration Directorate.

The emergency department, staffed by highly skilled medical officers and well-trained nurses, is open 24 hours a day and operates a round-the-clock ambulance service, not only for ADNOC employees and their families but the whole of the Al Dhafra Region. The Al Dhannah Hospital is now fully integrated with the former Ruwais Hospital, and provides a comprehensive health-care programme to all residents of the housing complex. The hospital provides a full range of general and emergency medical services with a team of more than 55 physicians covering more than 25 specialties, including nursing and child welfare, immunization and vaccination, school health, dental and physiotherapy services. For specialist medical services, many residents are often obliged to travel the 240 km (150 miles) for an appointment with other health professionals.

== Education ==
Schools in Al Dhannah consists of 2 main types of schools, those are Public and Private School, including one university.

=== Schools ===
The Main Private Schools are:

- Adnoc Schools (formerly known as The Glenelg School of Abu Dhabi)
- SABIS International Private School - Ruwais (formerly known as Ruwais Private School or The International School of Choueifat - Ruwais)
- The Asian International School (AIS)

The Main Public Schools are:

- Al Abbas Bin Abdul Muttalib Primary And Secondary School for Boys (AABAMPSSB)
- Amrah Bint Abd Al Rahman Secondary School for Girls (ABAARSSG)

=== Higher Education ===
- Higher Colleges of Technology - Al Dhannah Campus

== Demographics ==
Al Dhannah is estimated to be 89% expatriates, with rest being local Emiratis. Over 70 nationalities are represented within the population. The most common languages spoken are English, Arabic, Hindi/Urdu, Tagalog, and Tamil/Malayalam.

Al Dhannah, like the rest of the UAE, has a Muslim majority alongside various minority religions practiced by the non-nationals. Christianity is estimated to be 13% of the population.

== Climate ==
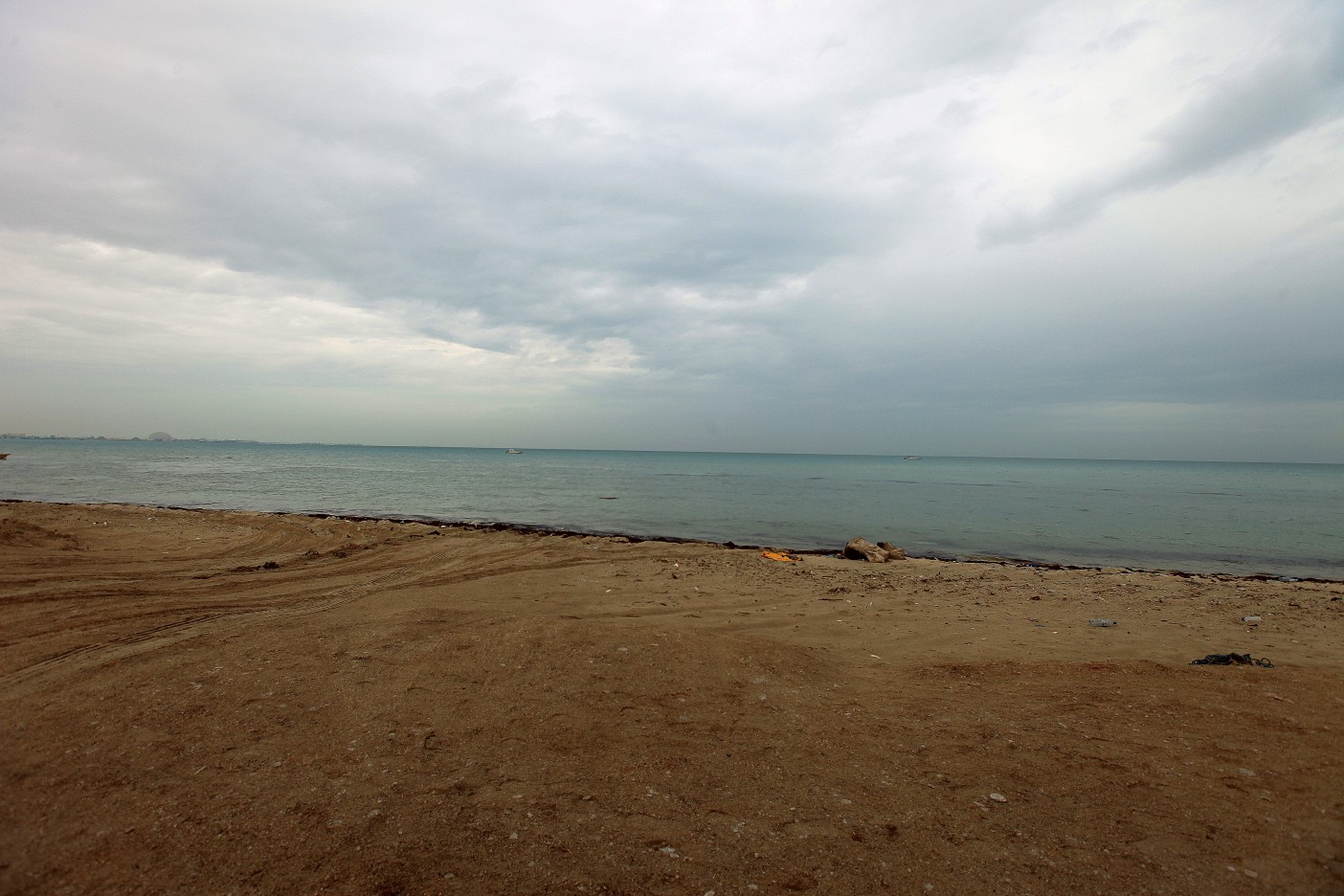
Ruwais Beach, bordering the Gulf

The climate of Ruwais is similar to Abu Dhabi, which is a hot desert climate (Köppen climate classification BWh). July is the hottest month, with average maximum temperatures above 40 °C. Sandstorms occur intermittently, in some cases reducing visibility to a few meters.

On average, January is the coolest month in the year. Since the Tropic of Cancer passes through the emirate, the southern part falls within the Tropics. However, despite the coolest month having a 22.0 °C (71.6 °F) average, its climate is far too dry to be classed as tropical.

Climate data for Ruwais
Month	Jan	Feb	Mar	Apr	May	Jun	Jul	Aug	Sep	Oct	Nov	Dec	Year
Record high °C (°F)	33.7 (92.7)	34.4 (93.9)	39.8 (103.6)	44.5 (112.1)	46.2 (115.2)	47.3 (117.1)	48.0 (118.4)	46.1 (115.0)	44.6 (112.3)	41.6 (106.9)	36.7 (98.1)	32.3 (90.1)	48.0 (118.4)
Mean daily maximum °C (°F)	23.7 (74.7)	24.8 (76.6)	28.4 (83.1)	32.9 (91.2)	37.5 (99.5)	38.8 (101.8)	40.4 (104.7)	40.4 (104.7)	39.0 (102.2)	35.0 (95.0)	30.1 (86.2)	25.7 (78.3)	33.1 (91.5)
Daily mean °C (°F)	18.7 (65.7)	19.6 (67.3)	22.8 (73.0)	26.8 (80.2)	31.0 (87.8)	32.8 (91.0)	34.7 (94.5)	34.9 (94.8)	32.9 (91.2)	29.1 (84.4)	24.5 (76.1)	20.7 (69.3)	27.4 (81.3)
Mean daily minimum °C (°F)	13.8 (56.8)	14.5 (58.1)	17.3 (63.1)	20.8 (69.4)	24.6 (76.3)	26.8 (80.2)	29.0 (84.2)	29.4 (84.9)	26.8 (80.2)	23.2 (73.8)	19.0 (66.2)	15.8 (60.4)	21.8 (71.1)
Record low °C (°F)	7.9 (46.2)	7.5 (45.5)	10.2 (50.4)	13.3 (55.9)	16.0 (60.8)	21.7 (71.1)	22.7 (72.9)	25.6 (78.1)	20.4 (68.7)	15.4 (59.7)	12.3 (54.1)	7.5 (45.5)	7.5 (45.5)
Average precipitation mm (inches)	7.0 (0.28)	21.2 (0.83)	14.5 (0.57)	6.1 (0.24)	1.3 (0.05)	0 (0)	0 (0)	1.5 (0.06)	0 (0)	0 (0)	0.3 (0.01)	5.2 (0.20)	57.1 (2.24)
Average precipitation days (≥ 0.2 mm)	1.2	2.8	2.8	1.2	0.1	0	0	0.1	0	0	0.2	1.5	9.9
Average relative humidity (%)	68	67	63	58	55	60	61	63	64	65	65	68	63
Mean monthly sunshine hours	246.1	232.6	251.1	280.5	342.2	336.9	314.2	307.5	302.4	304.7	286.6	257.6	3,462.4
Source: NOAA (1971–1991)
