= Ruwais refinery =

United Arab Emirates oil processing facility

Coordinates: 24.106288°N 52.727833°E

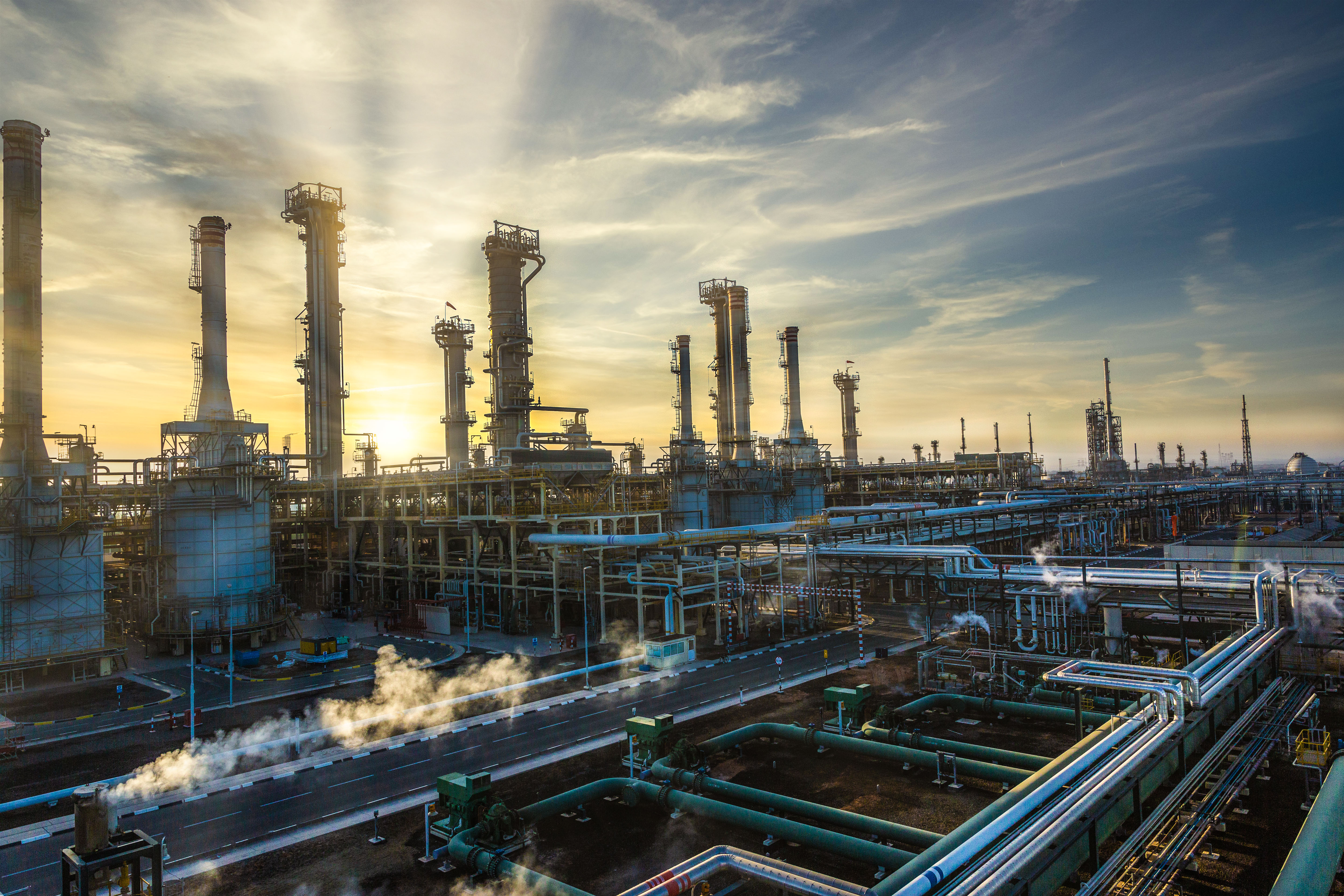
Ruwais Refinery

The Ruwais Refinery is operated by the Abu Dhabi National Oil Company (ADNOC). The complex can process up to 922,000 barrels of crude oil and condensate per day, making it the fourth-largest single-site oil refinery in the world and the biggest in the Middle East. The refinery is situated in the city of Al Dhannah, in Abu Dhabi’s western region. It is highly integrated with ADNOC’s other plants in the Ruwais industrial area – such as the Borouge 3 petrochemical plant.

== History ==
The Ruwais Refinery was inaugurated by Sheikh Zayed bin Sultan Al Nahyan in 1982 as part of his vision to transform the area into a hub for oil and gas processing. Over subsequent decades, the site has grown in capacity and complexity to include a Hydrocracker Plant (1985), a Condensate Plant (2000), a Gasoline Plant (2006), a Green Diesel Plant (2011), and a Base Oil Plant (2016). Today, the complex is known locally as Ruwais Refinery East. It has a processing capacity of 922,000 bpsd.

In 2014, a second complex was opened to meet the growing demand for ADNOC’s refined products. Known locally as Ruwais Refinery West, the facility can process up to 417,000 crude oil barrels per day. It contains the world’s largest residue catalytic cracking (RFCC) unit, allowing for 127,000 barrels of heavy residue to be upgraded into middle distillates every day. In 2018, the refinery opened a carbon black and delayed coker plant, producing up to 430,000 tons per year of anode-grade calcined coke and 40,600 tons per year of carbon black. Other products include liquefied petroleum gas (LPG), unleaded gasoline, diesel, naphtha, jet-A1, base-oil, fuel oil, white spirit, and propylene.

The Ruwais Refinery is connected to three jetties equipped with multiple berths to allow for cargo transfers via the Persian Gulf. It is also connected to a pipeline network spanning over 1,600 km across the emirate, allowing for essential fuels to be distributed to sites like the Abu Dhabi International Airport.

The refinery also runs a General Utilities Plant, which supplies power and water to the entire Ruwais industrial area and two environmental protection facilities to treat and dispose of industrial waste safely.

In 2019, the European energy firms Eni and OMV entered into a partnership deal with ADNOC Refining. These companies respectively hold 20% and 15% of the Ruwais Refinery under the joint venture, with ADNOC owning the remaining 65%.

After a drone strike on 10 March 2026 that caused fire, the refinery closed.

== Upcoming Projects ==
Work is underway to diversify the range of crude oil being refined in Ruwais. Once complete in 2022, the $3.5bn Crude Flexibility Project will give ADNOC Refining the ability to process 420,000 bpd of grades such as Upper Zakum – and over 50 others – to increase value.
