= Central European Gas Hub =

Central European Gas Hub AG
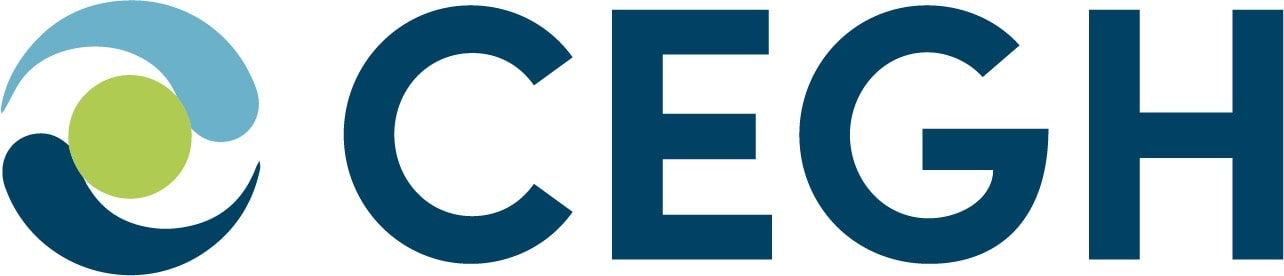
- CEGH LOGO 2023
- Industry: Natural gas
- Founded: 2005
- Headquarters: Vienna, Austria
- Key people: Gottfried Steiner (CEO)
- Services: Gas trading platform
- Website: www.cegh.at

Central European Gas Hub AG (CEGH, formerly known as Gas Hub Baumgarten) is a natural gas company based in Vienna, Austria. It was founded in 2005 as a subsidiary of OMV Gas & Power GmbH. In December 2009, CEGH, together with Wiener Börse AG, opened the CEGH Gas Exchange Spot Market. The Futures market followed in December 2010. CEGH is owned by OMV Gas & Power GmbH (65%), Wiener Börse AG (Vienna Stock Exchange) 20% and the Slovak gas transmission system operator eustream a.s. (15%).

Central European Gas Hub provides a gas trading platform in Austria for international gas trading companies. Since January 2013 CEGH is the operator of the VTP (Virtual Trading Point) in Austria (market area east).
