= Sultan Al Jaber =

Emirati politician and businessman (born 1973)

Sultan Al Jaber CBE
- سلطان الجابر
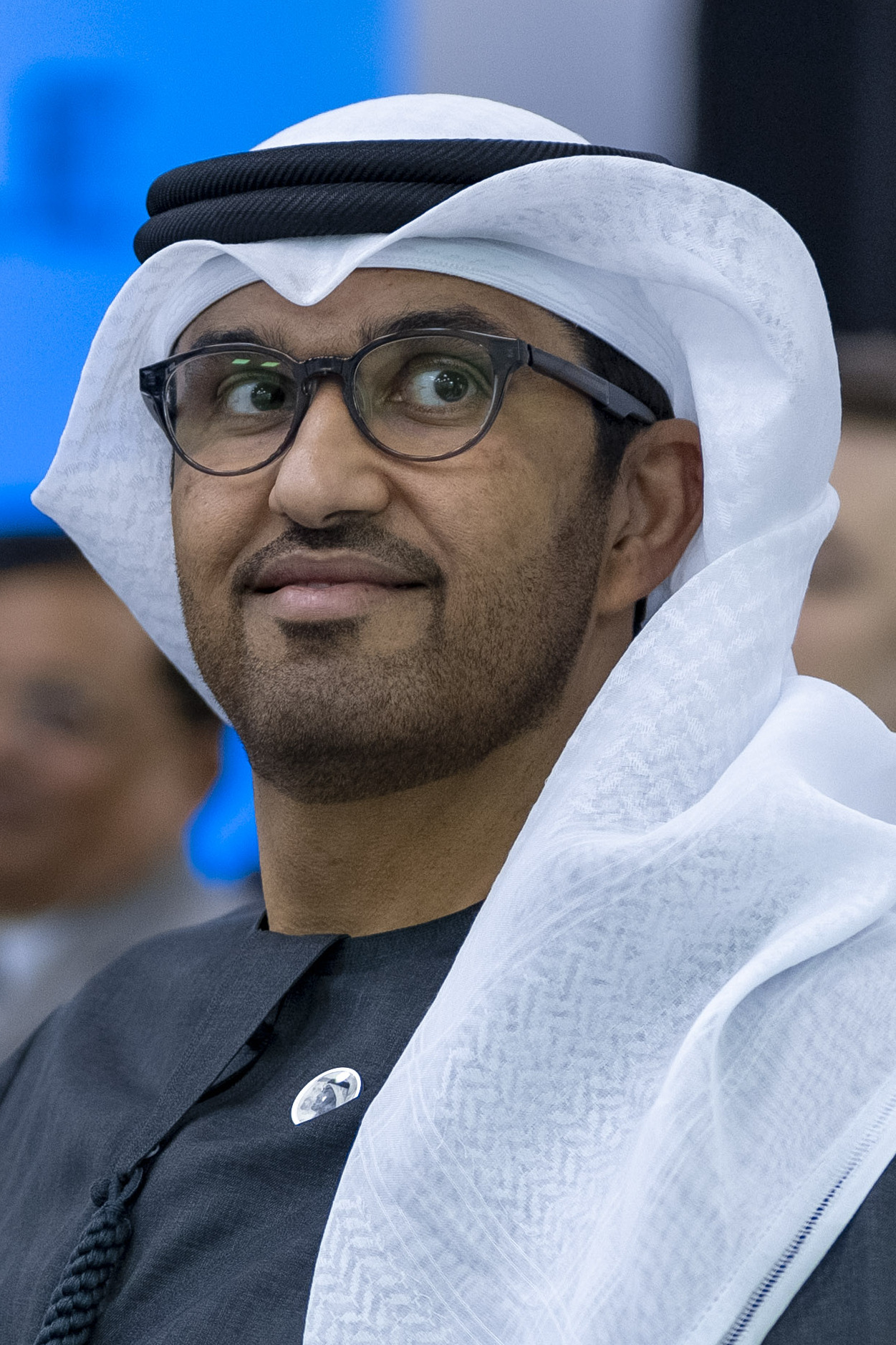
- Al Jaber in 2023

President of COP28
- In office 12 January 2023 – 7 January 2024

UAE Special Envoy for Climate Change

Minister of Industry and Advanced Technology
- Incumbent
- Assumed office 5 July 2020
- President: Khalifa bin Zayed Al Nahyan; Mohammed bin Zayed Al Nahyan
- Prime Minister: Mohammed bin Rashid Al Maktoum
- Preceded by: Hamdan bin Rashid Al Maktoum

CEO and Managing Director of ADNOC
- Incumbent
- Assumed office 16 February 2016
- Preceded by: Abdullah Al Suwaidi

Minister of State
- In office 12 March 2013 – 5 July 2020
- President: Khalifa bin Zayed Al Nahyan
- Prime Minister: Mohammed bin Rashid Al Maktoum

Personal details
- Born: Sultan Ahmed Al Jaber; 31 August 1973 (age 53) Umm Al Quwain, United Arab Emirates
- Children: 4
- Education: University of Southern California (BS); Coventry University (PhD); California State University at Los Angeles (MBA)

Sultan Ahmed Al Jaber, CBE (Arabic: سلطان أحمد الجابر; born 31 August 1973) is an Emirati politician who is the minister of industry and advanced technology of the United Arab Emirates, head of the Abu Dhabi National Oil Company (ADNOC), and chairman of Masdar.

Al Jaber is the UAE's special envoy for climate change, and the president of the COP28 climate talks. His appointment as head of the COP28 climate talks was strongly criticized by environmentalists due to his track record at ADNOC. As head of ADNOC, Al Jaber has overseen a substantial expansion of gas and oil production at the same time that fossil fuel industries are under pressure to reduce output in order to mitigate climate change.

== Early life and education ==
A native of the UAE, Al Jaber was born on 31 August 1973 in Umm Al Quwain, UAE. He holds a BSc in Chemical Engineering from the University of Southern California, a PhD in business and economics from Coventry University, and an MBA from the California State University at Los Angeles. His education in the United States was financed by a scholarship provided by ADNOC.

== Business career ==
=== Masdar ===
Al Jaber was the founding CEO of Masdar, beginning in 2006, and was appointed chairman in March 2014. Under his leadership, Masdar expanded its investment in renewable energy to diversify the country's dependency on oil and gain diplomatic clout. By the end of 2022, Masdar had invested in 40 countries. Under his chairmanship Masdar underwent a restructuring that brought in TAQA, ADNOC and Mubadala as shareholders in 2022.

=== Abu Dhabi National Oil Company ===
Al Jaber began his career as an engineer at ADNOC. He was appointed as the CEO of the company on 15 February 2016. Since that time Al Jaber has publicly listed several ADNOC businesses, while also attracting some US$26 billion in international investment from companies such as BlackRock, Eni, and KKR.

In February 2019 Al Jaber signed a US$4 billion agreement with BlackRock and KKR to invest in the development of midstream oil pipeline infrastructure. A consortium of six companies signed an agreement in July 2020 to invest US$20.7 billion in ADNOC infrastructure assets. It was the single-largest energy infrastructure investment ever in the Middle East, and the largest in the world for 2020 at the time. Al Jaber led the first IPO of an ADNOC business, ADNOC Distribution. in 2017.

In December 2023, the BBC reported that ADNOC, under Al Jaber, was seeking to increase its output of crude oil from 3 million barrels of oil a day in 2016 to 5 million by 2030. The New York Times noted that ADNOC was one of few oil companies still making large investments in raising production in 2021. Financial Times wrote that Al Jaber's attempts to increase oil output was "particularly stark" given that he holds the role of climate tsar in the UAE and given that fossil fuel industries are under pressure to reduce output in order to mitigate climate change. Financial Times wrote in 2023 that ADNOC was set to invest US$150 billion in expanding its oil and gas production while only setting aside US$15 billion for low-carbon expansion over a longer period.

Al Jaber has tried to position the UAE as a leader on environmental issues, and himself as an environmental advocate. Under Al Jaber, ADNOC has invested in carbon capture and green hydrogen projects, while also committing to power its operations with renewable energy sources. However, critics say these investments pale in comparison to Al Jaber's expansion of gas and oil production and are part of a greenwashing campaign. Stanley Reed, an energy journalist for the New York Times, commented that these announcements were in part "image-burnishing", and that while Abu Dhabi's government sought to diversify its economy, it also aimed to maintain a significant future market for its oil reserves.

Dr. Sultan Al Jaber unveiled the world's first renewable energy facility capable of providing uninterrupted power at the Abu Dhabi Sustainability Week 2025. This project combines 5.2GW of solar PV with 19 GWh of battery storage to produce 1GW of continuous baseload renewable energy.

Early in the U.S.-Iranian war, he called for a ceasefire, calling for the unconditional opening of the Strait of Hormuz. "“The Strait was not built, engineered, financed or constructed by any state. It is a natural passage governed by the United Nations Convention on the Law of the Sea, which guarantees transit as a matter of right; not a privilege to be granted, withheld or weaponized,” H.E Dr Al Jaber said, adding: “Conditional passage is not passage. It is control by another name. The Strait must be open — fully, unconditionally, and without restriction," he wrote on LinkedIn.

=== Board positions ===
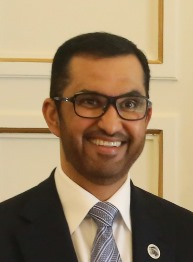
Sultan Ahmed Al Jaber in 2024

Al Jaber is the ADNOC group chief executive, and a member of the Abu Dhabi Supreme Council for Financial and Economic Affairs. He is chairman of the Emirates Development Bank, and the board of trustees of the Mohamed bin Zayed University of Artificial Intelligence. He has previously been chairman of the board for the Abu Dhabi Ports, from 2009 until 2019, Abu Dhabi Media, and Sky News Arabia.

=== COP28 presidency ===
In January 2023, Al Jaber was named president of the COP28 climate conference in Dubai.

Prior to the climate summit, Al Jaber dismissed calls that a fossil fuel phase-out is needed to restrict global heating to 1.5C, claiming it would harm economic development and that there was "no science" behind the proposal during a live climate event and discussion with Mary Robinson. Climate advocacy groups expressed concern about his comments, with Climate Analytics CEO Bill Hare describing it as "verging on climate denial." During the summit, Al Jaber defended himself, stating that his word had been misrepresented. He later added that the summit over which he presided delivered "world first after world first".

On 27 November 2023, the Centre for Climate Reporting and BBC News reported that, based on leaked documents, the UAE had been in violation of the UNFCCC's code of conduct by planning to use COP28 to pitch oil and gas deals to foreign governments. Al Jaber denied reports that UAE wanted to seek oil deals in summit, calling the allegations false and an attempt to undermine work of the COP28 presidency.

Under Al Jaber's presidency, the summit committed to a climate agreement containing language directing a "transition away from fossil fuels". This was the first United Nations Framework Convention on Climate Change COP event where an agreement was reached which suggested such a direction for fossil fuels. At the same time, the agreement was criticised for not including an explicit committent to phase out fossil fuels, and for including carbon storage as a means to reduce emissions.

In a 2025 interview with the Financial Times, Al Jaber, looking back at COP28, stated that the agreement was still a "useful tool" but now described himself as a "climate realist" and proposed to solve the issues arising from climate change by political and technical means instead of trying to limit fossil fuel consumption.

== United Arab Emirates government minister ==
On 12 March 2013, Al Jaber was named minister of state and joined the United Arab Emirates Council of Ministers. He held the position until July 2020, when he was appointed as minister of industry and advanced technology. In November of the same year, he was appointed as the special envoy for climate change to represent the UAE in all international forums on this issue.

== Energy and climate change ==
In 2009, Al Jaber was appointed by United Nations Secretary-General Ban Ki-moon to his Advisory Group on Energy and Climate Change (AGECC). In the same year, as CEO of Masdar, he helped bring the headquarters of the International Renewable Energy Agency (IRENA) to the UAE. Al Jaber has advocated for a global approach to addressing climate change at international forums such as the 2022 Munich Security Conference. He has also emphasized the key role national hydrocarbon producers should play in the energy transition, arguing that the least carbon-intensive barrels will be required for the foreseeable future.

During Al Jaber's tenure as special climate envoy to the UN Framework Convention on Climate Change (UNCCC) for the UAE, the organization chose the UAE as the host for the COP28 in 2023. Amnesty International reacted to ADNOC Drilling's plan to expand fossil fuel production and its record profits, comparing them to the appointment of the company's chief executive Sultan al-Jaber as the chair of COP28 climate talks in 2023. Amnesty expressed concerns that the oil company was trying to hijack the conference to serve wider fossil fuel interests, and that the climate conference would discuss ways to deal with climate change while the company he leads causes major harm to the climate with its waste and spills from oil and gas, radioactive material, salts and toxic chemicals and the release of greenhouse gas. US Senator Ed Markey opposed the decision to host the upcoming COP28 global climate conference in the UAE and expressed doubts about the UAE's "sincerity" towards commitment for climate action. Citing Al Jaber's claim that his leadership role will allow him to push the industry to decarbonize, Ed Markey said he doubted if such commitments will be maintained after the conference. Days after Ed Markey's statement, more than 130 US lawmakers and members of the European Parliament called for the removal Sultan Al Jaber as the president-designate of the COP28 climate summit.

=== 2023 greenwashing accusations ===
In May 2023, The Guardian reported that Al Jaber had been accused of attempting to greenwash his image, through members of his team editing Wikipedia to portray him favorably as an advocate for green energy, while downplaying his involvement in the fossil fuel industry. Edits included adding a quote that described Al Jaber as "an ally to the climate movement" and suggesting that editors remove reference to a multibillion-dollar oil pipeline deal he signed in 2019. A Wikipedia user, who disclosed they were being paid by ADNOC, suggested changing the page to say that Al Jaber had simply attracted "international investment" in ADNOC, instead of mentioning the specific agreement with BlackRock and KKR for the development of oil pipeline infrastructure. A Wikipedia user was also reported to have been editing Wikipedia articles, despite having been "strongly discouraged" from doing so by a Wikipedia administrator. A June 2023 Guardian investigation also claimed that a large number of fake Twitter and Medium accounts have been either promoting and defending the hosting of COP28 by the UAE using stock or AI-generated profile images, including reposting UAE government tweets and trying to rebut criticism of Al Jaber's presidency.

In August 2023, a report based on leaked documents revealed an alleged list prepared on "touchy and sensitive issues" concerning the UAE. It included the government-approved "strategic messages" to be used as a reply to questions from the media. The reported issues included climate-related questions on Al Jaber's presidency and ADNOC's failure in disclosing its emissions, and the UAE's human rights records, including in human trafficking and the Yemeni Civil War. Later in August, it was revealed that under Al Jaber's leadership, ADNOC's 2019 methane leak target had been set to levels considerably higher than those the company had previously reported to the UN and cited a Harvard study alleging that it suggested "leaky infrastructure combined with deliberate venting or incomplete flaring of gas." COP28 has the highest carbon emissions of any climate summit.

=== Alleged fossil fuel deals at COP28 ===
On 27 November 2023, the Centre for Climate Reporting and BBC News reported that based on leaked documents, the UAE intended to use COP28 as a platform to discuss fossil fuel deals with fifteen countries, including a deal with China to "jointly evaluate international LNG opportunities" in Mozambique, Canada and Australia. The report stated that fossil fuel talks between ADNOC and 15 countries were planned, in addition to talks between Masdar and 20 countries including the United Kingdom, France, Germany and others ahead of the summit. Al Jaber denied reports that the UAE wanted to seek oil deals at the summit, calling the allegations an attempt to undermine his work.

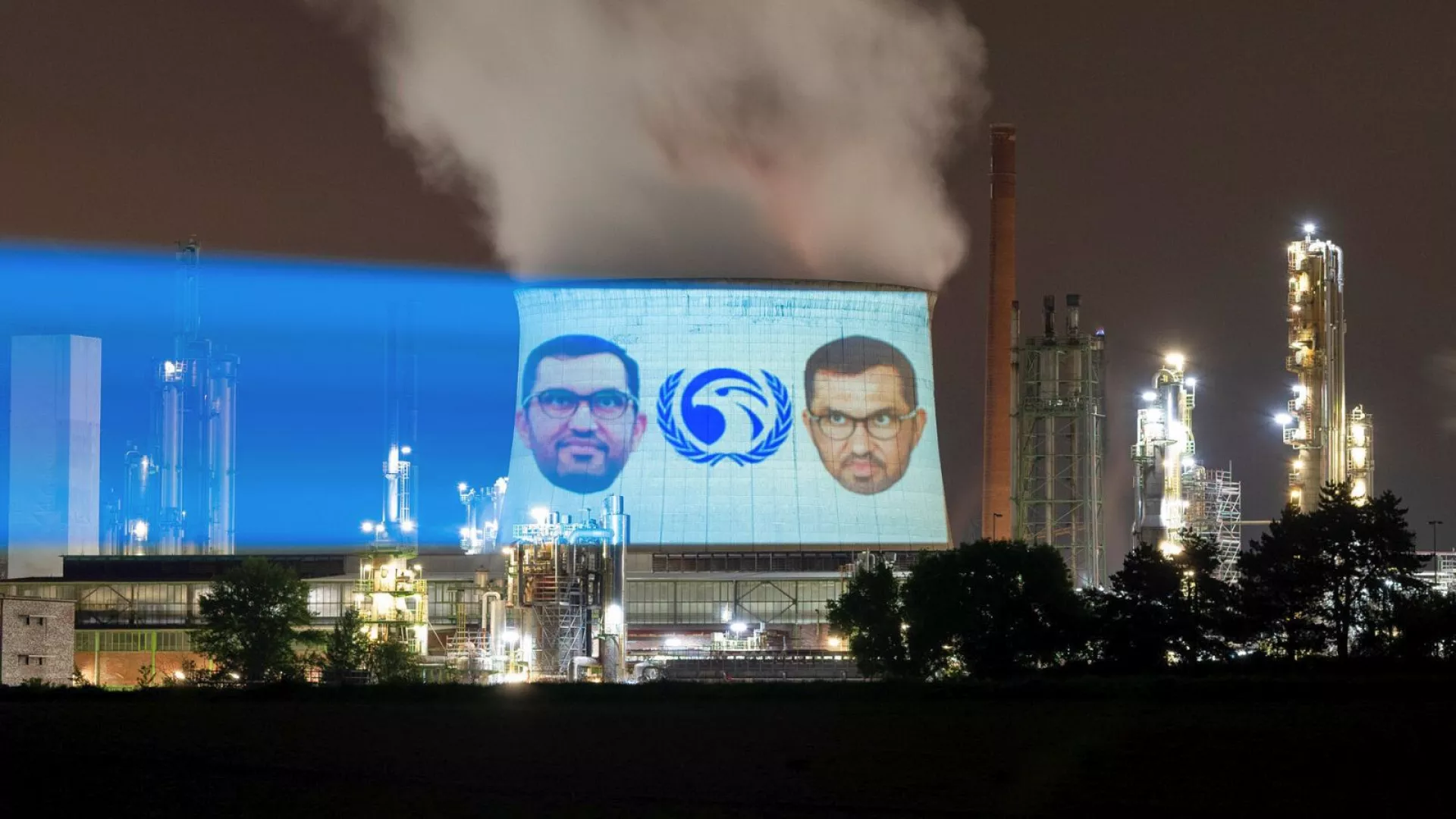
COP28 President Sultan Al Jaber projected on an oil refinery in Bonn, Germany, near the UNFCCC intercessional meeting

== Honors ==
In 2013 Al Jaber was appointed honorary Commander of the Order of the British Empire (CBE). In that year he also received Mauritania's Medal of the National Order of Merit. In 2019, he received the International Lifetime Achievement Award from Prime Minister Narendra Modi of India.

== Personal life ==
Sultan Al Jaber is married and has four children.
