= Borouge =

Emirati chemical company

- Native name: بروج
- Company type: Public; ADX:BOROUGE
- Founded: 1998
- Headquarters: Abu Dhabi, UAE
- Owner: ADNOC and Borealis
- Website: www.borouge.com

Borouge is an Abu Dhabi–based petrochemicals company and a manufacturer of polyolefins. It is a joint venture of the Abu Dhabi National Oil Company and Borealis of Austria. The company was founded in 1998 and has a workforce of more than 3,100.

The company has two complementary ventures: Abu Dhabi Polymers Co Ltd (Borouge) – a production company based in Abu Dhabi – and Borouge Pte Ltd based in Singapore. CEO of Abu Dhabi Polymers Co Ltd (Borouge) is Hazeem Sultan Al Suwaidi. CEO of Borouge Pte Ltd is Rainer Hoefling.

The company supplies polyolefin plastics (polyethylene and polypropylene). They focus on differentiated high end applications in the Middle East, Asia Pacific and Africa with Borstar Enhanced Polyethylene produced in Abu Dhabi, UAE and the Borealis range of speciality products, including fittings, pipes, healthcare, and mobility products, wires and cables, and packaging. The two primary product categories for Borouge's polymers are consumer-related such as greenhouse films, and infrastructure such as cables for power transmission.

In 2022, Borouge was listed on the Abu Dhabi Securities Exchange, raising $2 billion in the initial public offering. In March 2025, ADNOC and OMV announced the merger of Borouge with Borealis and the acquisition of Nova Chemicals for $9.7 billion, creating a $60 billion global polyolefins leader, making it the fourth largest in the world by production capacity.

Borouge was ranked 34th on Forbes Middle East's Top 100 Listed Companies 2025 list.
