= Frauke Heard-Bey =

German historian

Dr Frauke Heard-Bey is a German historian, political scientist, author and researcher. She is the author of From Trucial States to United Arab Emirates, considered a classic text on the Gulf.

She is widely recognised as one of the most influential historians and researchers on the United Arab Emirates, its tribes and its social and political development leading up to the establishment of the UAE as a nation. She was an active participant in the establishment of the Abu Dhabi based Centre for Documentation and Research, now the UAE National Archive, where she has worked since 1969.

== Early life ==
Heard-Bey was born in Berlin in 1941, and was the second daughter of Rear-Admiral Erich Bey. Her father commanded the taskforce including the battleship Scharnhorst in the Battle of the North Cape on 26 December 1943, during which he was killed. The Bey family lived in Gera in Thuringia but fled the GDR illegally to live in Rottweil in 1952. While at school Heard-Bey worked in the UK as an Au pair, during which time she met and embarked on a relationship with English student David Heard.

Attending Heidelberg University from 1961, she studied history, Political Science and English, continuing her studies at the Freie Universität in West Berlin, graduating with a Ph.D. in 1967. In September that year, she married David Heard, who had taken up a position in 1963 working as a geologist and petroleum engineer in Abu Dhabi. Moving to Abu Dhabi to be with Heard, she studied Arabic and worked on a shortened version of her doctoral thesis, on Berlin politics following World War I, which was published as a book in 1968 by Kohlhammer.

== Research ==
Heard-Bey joined the Centre for Documentation and Research in Abu Dhabi in 1969, based in the former home of the Ruler of Abu Dhabi, Sheikh Shakhbut bin Sultan Al Nahyan, the Qasr Al Hosn. Originally set up in anticipation of border disputes, prior to the foundation of the United Arab Emirates on 2 December 1971, the centre moved out of Qasr Al Hosn in 1998 to its current location near the Sharia Court, and in 2014 was established as the UAE National Archives.

Heard-Bey has authored over 75 articles in foreign academic journals, joint books, published seminar papers and reviews. In 1994 she was awarded the Bundesverdienstkreuz by President Richard von Weizsäcker and in 2007 received the Abu Dhabi Award from Sheikh Mohammad bin Zayed.

== Books ==
- From Trucial States to United Arab Emirates. A Society in Transition was originally published by Longman in 1982, with a second edition in 1996. A third edition was published by Dubai-based Motivate Publishing in 2004. It was finally published in her native German in 2010.
- Abu Dhabi, the United Arab Emirates and the Gulf Region: Fifty Years of Transformation was published by Gerlach Press in Berlin in 2017.

== Personal life ==
David Heard was, until 2005, the representative of the Abu Dhabi Petroleum Company and was himself an author, charting the history of the UAE's oil industry in From Pearls to Oil. They had three children, born between 1975 and 1983. Heard died in October 2024. The Frauke Heard-Bey and David Heard collection of documents amassed by the couple over fifty years of research on the history of the Emirates is held at New York University Abu Dhabi.
