= Masdar =

UAE state-owned renewable energy company

- Type: Subsidiary
- Industry: Renewable energy, clean technology, Green hydrogen
- Founded: 2006; 20 years ago
- Headquarters: Abu Dhabi, United Arab Emirates
- Key people: Sultan Ahmed Al Jaber (chairman); Mohamed Jameel Al Ramahi (CEO)
- Owner: Abu Dhabi National Oil Company, Mubadala Investment Company, Abu Dhabi National Energy Company
- Website: www.masdar.ae

Masdar (Arabic: مصدر), also known as the Abu Dhabi Future Energy Company, is a United Arab Emirates state-owned renewable energy company. It was founded in 2006 as a subsidiary of the UAE state-owned Mubadala Investment Company. Masdar has worked to deflect criticisms of the UAE, a major fossil fuel producer, and defend the country's environmental record.

== History ==
In 2006, the UAE government established Abu Dhabi Future Energy Company PJSC (Masdar) to diversify the entire resources and boost the local economy.

Sultan Al Jaber is the founder and served as the CEO of Masdar when it was founded in 2006. In 2009, he oversaw Masdar's efforts to secure the presence of the International Renewable Energy Agency (IRENA) headquarters at Masdar City, delivering the successful bid in South Korea. In early 2016, Mohamed Jameel Al Ramahi was appointed as the chief executive officer of Masdar.

In December 2022 it was announced that the Abu Dhabi National Energy Company PJSC (TAQA), Mubadala Investment Company (Mubadala) and Abu Dhabi National Oil Company (ADNOC) would partner under Masdar brand to form a global clean energy powerhouse focused on renewable energy and green hydrogen.

In March 2024, it was announced Masdar had acquired a 50% stake in San Diego, California-headquartered renewables company, Terra-Gen Power from its parent company, Energy Capital Partners for an undisclosed amount.

Masdar garnered laurels from Austria's ex-chancellor Sebastian Kurz who has been working for the company since 2022. With Austrian Verbund it signed a joint study agreement about large scale green hydrogen production in Spain.

=== COP28 ===
During the COP28, Masdar was reported to have hired lobbyists and a public relations firm, First International Resources, to defend its work during the COP28 after criticism from politicians and environmentalists. Masdar chairman and founder Sultan Al Jaber, was the president of COP28. According to the contract, the consultancy was to respond to and deflect negative press reports about Al Jaber. According to The Guardian, edits on Wikipedia have been made by a user, who disclosed being paid by Masdar, to make Al Jaber's role at Masdar more prominent on his page the day after The Guardian revealed his appointment as president of COP28.

== Projects ==
=== Dogger Bank Wind Farm ===
On 1 December 2023, it was agreed that Masdar would part of an £11 billion investment in the UK's Dogger Bank wind farm project. The agreement was made at the COP28 summit that was held in the UAE.

=== Masdar City ===
Masdar City is a sustainable urban development project located in Abu Dhabi that was launched by Masdar in 2008 and was designed to be a zero-carbon city by 2016. The city is powered in part by the Masdar City 10MW Solar Power Plant, the first grid-connected renewable energy project in the UAE and the largest of its kind in the Middle East when it was inaugurated in 2009. An additional 1MW of rooftop PV is located on the buildings developed as phase 1 of Masdar City.

=== Shams Solar Power ===
Shams 1 is a 100 MW concentrating solar power station which uses parabolic trough technology. It displaces 175,000 tons of CO_{2} per year and its power output is enough to power 20,000 homes. The station consists of 258,048 parabolic trough mirrors, 192 solar collector assembly loops with 8 solar collector assemblies per loop, 768 solar collector assembly units, and 27,648 absorber pipes. It covers an area of approximately 2.5 square kilometres (0.97 sq mi).

=== 1 GW baseload solar ===
In 2025, Masdar began construction of a baseload power station with an expected 1 GW constant output, supplied by a 5.2 GW solar plant and a 19 GWh battery by 2027.
