= Abu Dhabi National Oil Company =

UAE state-owned oil company

- Headquarters in Abu Dhabi
- Native name: شركة بترول أبو ظبي الوطنية
- Industry: Oil and gas industry
- Founded: 1971; 55 years ago
- Founder: Zayed Bin Sultan Al Nahyan
- Headquarters: Abu Dhabi, Abu Dhabi, United Arab Emirates
- Key people: Mohamed bin Zayed Al Nahyan (chairman); Sultan Ahmed Al Jaber (Director-General & CEO)
- Products: Petroleum; Oil products Natural gas Petrochemicals
- Number of employees: 207,356 (2015)
- Website: www.adnoc.ae

The Abu Dhabi National Oil Company (Arabic: شركة بترول أبو ظبي الوطنية), known by its acronym ADNOC, is the state-owned oil company of Abu Dhabi, United Arab Emirates. It is the world's 12th largest oil company by production. In 2024, ADNOC had a crude oil production capacity of 4.85 million barrels per day and planned to increase it to 5 million barrels per day by 2027. It is the United Arab Emirate's largest oil company.

ADNOC's output was roughly flat at about 2.5 million barrels per day during the 1990s. It stood at 2.9 mbpd in 2008. Although its financial indicators are difficult to assess as the company has been described as secretive, it has also been described as efficient and well managed. ADNOC is one of few oil companies in the world to make a substantial investment to increase oil production amid growing pressure to reduce output due to climate change.

In 2024, ADNOC's oil products represented 564 Mt of CO_{2} emissions, which was 1.46% of global CO_{2} emissions.

== History ==
In November 2019, ADNOC received approval from the emirate's Supreme Petroleum Council to list its flagship Murban crude oil as a futures contract on an international stock exchange. Murban is a highly prized grade of crude oil that accounts for about half of the UAE's total oil output of about 3 million barrels per day.

A joint venture between ADNOC and the Abu Dhabi Developmental Holding Company (ADQ) was launched in July 2020 to invest in chemicals projects in the planned Ruwais Derivatives Park. ADNOC will have a 60% stake while ADQ will hold a 40% share.

In December 2021, ADNOC and Abu Dhabi National Energy Company PJSC (TAQA) announced a $3.6 billion project to aim to reduce the carbon footprint of ADNOC's offshore production operations by more than 30%.

In December 2022, it was announced ADNOC had acquired a 24.9% stake in Austrian integrated oil, gas, and petrochemical company, OMV.

In 2023, ADNOC awarded $17 billion in engineering, procurement and construction (EPC) contracts for the Hail and Ghasha Offshore Development project.

One contract is a joint venture with the National Petroleum Company and Saipem S.p.A and the second one with Technimont S.p.A.

In December 2023, ADNOC agreed to acquire OCI's entire stake in ammonia and urea producer Fertiglobe for $3.62 billion.

In October 2024, ADNOC announced the acquisition of German chemical company Covestro for $16.3 billion. In July 2025, an investigation was opened by the European Commission to assess if the agreement involves financial backing or subsidies from the UAE government, which could distort the European Union’s internal market. There were concerns that the ADNOC’s takeover may involve a valuation and terms that could be unfair for unsubsidized investors. The investigation came after the Commission had approved the deal following the regular merger review process in May 2025.

In July 2026, ADNOC signed a deal to wholly acquire South African fuel company Shell South Africa from its existing parent, Shell plc. The deal, worth around R16 billion ($1 billion) is expected to close in 2027. ADNOC agreed to sell a 28% stake in Shell SA to a South African empowerment partner and Employee Stock Option Plan (ESOP) after completion of the deal. ADNOC also confirmed it had signed a long-term licensing agreement to continue using the Shell brand for its South African gas stations and lubricant operations.

== Operations ==
In November 2019, the United Arab Emirates was reported to hold approximately 105 billion barrels of proven oil reserves, ranking sixth worldwide at the time. Most of the country's oil reserves are in Abu Dhabi.

ADNOC's activities span the upstream, midstream and downstream oil and gas sectors through its operating companies and joint ventures. Its operations include onshore and offshore hydrocarbon production, natural gas processing, oil refining, petrochemicals, logistics and fuel distribution. It supplies natural gas for domestic electricity generation, desalination and industrial use, and exports liquefied natural gas (LNG).

The Ruwais Refinery is ADNOC's principal refining complex, with a stated processing capacity of approximately 922,000 barrels of crude oil and condensate per day. The former Umm Al Nar (Abu Dhabi) refinery was decommissioned in 2021.

In May 2026, ADNOC announced that it would accelerate the West–East Pipeline project to expand crude oil export capacity through the port of Fujairah, outside the Strait of Hormuz. The expanded pipeline was expected to become operational in 2027.

=== Major oil and gas developments ===
The Hail and Ghasha offshore development in the Ghasha Concession is intended to produce natural gas from sour-gas reservoirs. Its development plan includes facilities on artificial islands, subsea pipelines and associated gas processing infrastructure. ADNOC approved the project in October 2023 and the associated engineering, procurement and construction contracts included offshore drilling facilities and more than 300 kilometres of subsea pipelines. At the time of approval, the development was planned to produce more than 1.5 billion standard cubic feet of gas per day by the end of 2029. In December 2025, ADNOC announced up to US$11 billion in structured financing tied to future gas output from Hail and Ghasha, following the withdrawal of Lukoil from the development.

In July 2026, ADNOC and its partners approved a US$6.2 billion final investment decision for development of the offshore Umm Shaif Gas Cap. The project was expected to supply more than 600 million standard cubic feet per day of natural gas and associated gas liquids by 2030.

In November 2026, ADNOC took a final investment decision on the Ruwais Diyab unconventional gas development. The project was designed to produce approximately 345 million standard cubic feet per day of raw gas from 2029, with a potential later expansion.

ADNOC is also developing the Ruwais LNG export project, designed for a capacity of 9.6 million metric tonnes of LNG per year. In November 2026, ADNOC Gas said that its first export cargoes were expected in late 2028 or early 2029. ADNOC Gas was also studying alternative export routes, although no decision had been taken on a possible additional LNG export project at Fujairah.

=== Carbon capture and enhanced oil recovery ===
ADNOC has used captured carbon dioxide in enhanced oil recovery operations at its onshore oilfields. The Al Reyadah carbon capture facility, commissioned in 2016, was designed to capture up to 800,000 tonnes of carbon dioxide annually from steel production and transport the gas by pipeline for injection at the Rumaitha and Bab fields.

In September 2023, ADNOC approved the Habshan carbon capture, utilization and storage project, designed to capture and permanently store up to 1.5 million tonnes of carbon dioxide per year. This was a planned capacity rather than verified operational capture.

=== Foreign direct investment ===
Major investments were made in ADNOC in 2019 by US asset managers BlackRock and KKR and Italian investment firm Eni. The US firms acquired about 40% of ADNOC's pipeline assets for about US$4 billion, while Eni took a 20% stake in ADNOC Refining for more than US$3 billion. Austria's OMV also invested approximately US$2.8 billion for a 15% stake in the refining business. In October 2025, KKR announced an additional minority investment in ADNOC Gas Pipeline Assets.

Singapore's sovereign wealth fund, GIC, also invested in ADNOC's oil pipeline infrastructure in 2019, acquiring a 6% stake in a deal valued at US$600 million.

=== Headquarters ===
ADNOC Headquarters is the company's office tower in Abu Dhabi. Designed by HOK, the complex has more than 65 floors and includes associated meeting and support facilities. Its design incorporates energy-efficiency features, including a double-skin façade and photovoltaic glazing. ADNOC's corporate history dates the opening of its new headquarters to 2017.

=== Abu Dhabi Marathon ===
ADNOC is the title sponsor of the Abu Dhabi Marathon, held annually in December. The event has traditionally started and finished near ADNOC's headquarters on Abu Dhabi's Corniche Road.

== Leadership and corporate governance ==
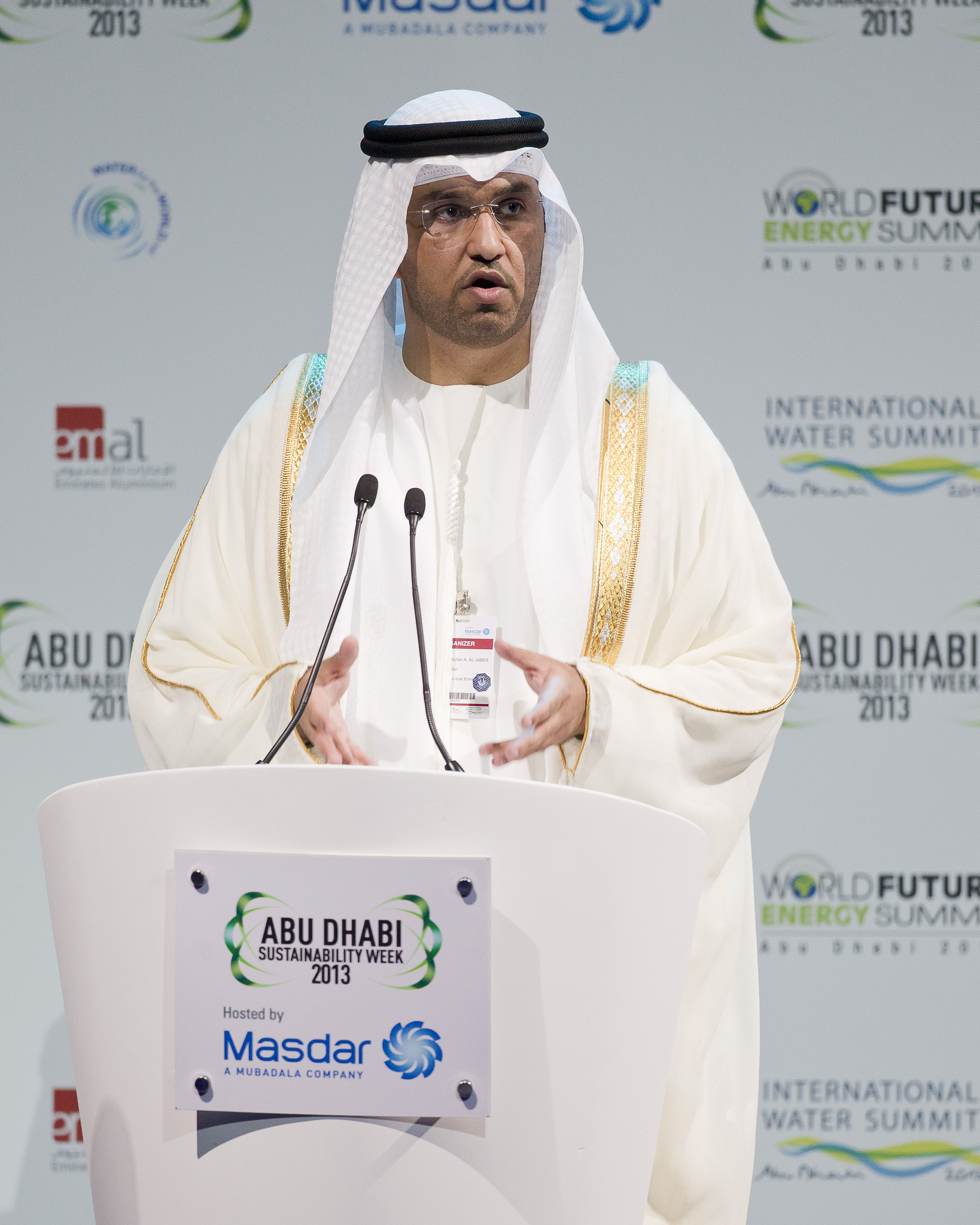
Sultan Al Jaber, director general and CEO of ADNOC Group.

=== Sultan Ahmed Al Jaber ===
Sultan Ahmed Al Jaber is the Minister of Industry and Advanced Technology in the UAE, CEO of ADNOC, the UAE's special envoy for climate change, and was Hey head of the COP28 climate summit. Under Al Jaber's leadership, ADNOC has invested in renewable energy and carbon capture, while also expanding its carbon business against trends in the industry, and with investments in carbon outstripping those in renewables. Sultan is also the president of the climate change conference COP28 which is being held in Dubai, UAE. He and the UAE have come under fire for greenwashing. Following the summit, Al Jaber announced that ADNOC would continue to invest in oil.

=== Supreme Petroleum Council ===
The Supreme Petroleum Council is the highest governing body of oil, gas, and similar industry-related activities in the Abu Dhabi. The council was formed in 1988. The council is tasked with supervising all oil and gas companies that operate in Abu Dhabi and the United Arab Emirates and acts as the board of directors for ADNOC.

== Operating companies ==
ADNOC operates numerous companies with different functions, including exploration and production; processing and refining; marketing and distribution.

=== Exploration and production of oil and gas ===
==== ADNOC Onshore ====
ADNOC Onshore works onshore and in shallow coastal water. It is previously known as Abu Dhabi Company for Onshore Petroleum Operations, ADCO. ADNOC Onshore operates primarily in Abu Dhabi. The company was originally known as Petroleum Development (Trucial Coast). It received its first concession on January 11, 1939, but did not begin geological operations until after World War II. The first commercially viable oil discovery was made at Bab in 1960. In 1962, the company was renamed the Abu Dhabi Petroleum Company. Exports began to flow from the Jebel Dhanna terminal on December 14, 1963. Abu Dhabi's government acquired 25% equity in the company in 1973 and increased its stake to 60% in 1974. The company started using the name Abu Dhabi Company for Onshore Petroleum Operations, ADCO, in 1978. ADNOC Onshore's primary exports are from the Jebel Dhanna and Fujairah terminals. ADNOC have a 60% share, the remaining 40% is split (CNPC (8%), BP (10%), Total (10%), Inpex (5%), CEFC (4%) and GS Energy of South Korea (3%)). In December 2018 ADNOC transferred China Energy's stake in onshore to China ZhenHua Oil Company, awarding the company a 4% stake.

==== ADNOC Offshore ====
ADNOC Offshore is the largest offshore oil producer in Abu Dhabi. It is ADNOC's dedicated offshore arm and is responsible for the development and delivery of oil and gas resources in Abu Dhabi waters. It was formed through the consolidation of two of ADNOC's upstream oil and gas companies: Abu Dhabi Marine Area Operating Company (ADMA-OPCO) and Zakum Development Company (ZADCO). With reorganisation, and the expiry of the 65-year-old ADMA concessions, the offshore concessions are now split by fields. ADNOC 60% then the 40% is split into Upper Zakum (Exxon / INPEX), (minor fields Umm Al Dalk, Satah (Inpex 40%)), Lower Zakum (TotalEnergies, ENI, ONGC, INPEX), Umm Shaif and Nasr (Total, ENI), Sarb and Umm Lulu (CEPSA, OMV).

==== ADNOC Drilling ====
ADNOC Drilling is ADNOC's oldest subsidiary. It was previously known as National Drilling Company, NDC. ADNOC Drilling is the largest drilling company in the Middle East. It drills for oil both onshore and offshore in Abu Dhabi. ADNOC currently has a 95% equity in ADNOC Drilling after energy services giant Baker Hughes, acquired a 5% stake (valued around $11 billion or AED40.4 billion) in 2018.

In September 2021, ADNOC Drilling announced its intention to list another 11% of shares in the company on the Abu Dhabi Securities Exchange (ADX) through an Initial Public Offering (IPO). On October 3, 2021, the company went public on the Abu Dhabi bourse, and became the most successful listing of all time in the emirate, jumping 30% on its first-ever day of trading.

==== Al Yasat Petroleum ====
Al Yasat Petroleum is ADNOC's youngest operating company. It is the first joint venture between ADNOC and China National Petroleum Corporation (CNPC), established in 2014. Tayba Al Hashemi is the current CEO of Al Yasat Petroleum. Al Yasat's role is to explore oil and gas potential within the company's mandated concession areas and to develop prospective locations on behalf of the company's shareholders. ADNOC is the majority shareholder and owns 60% of the company, with CNPC owning the remaining 40%.

==== Al Dhafra Petroleum ====
Al Dhafra Petroleum is an upstream company that is focused on unlocking undeveloped oil and gas potential in the UAE. Its shareholders are ADNOC, which owns 60% of the company, with Korea National Oil Corporation (KNOC) and GS Energy owning the remaining 40%.

==== ADNOC Sour Gas ====
ADNOC Sour Gas is a joint $10 billion venture between ADNOC and Occidental Petroleum that is expected to extract at least one billion cubic feet of ultra-sour gas per day. On a daily basis, the project is also expected to produce 504 million cubic feet of natural gas, 33,000 barrels of condensates, and thousands of tons of natural gas liquids, and thousands of tons of sulphur granules. The Project is located in the Shah gas field about 210 kilometers west of Abu Dhabi. Half of this field's production will be used to service domestic demand in the UAE and minimize the need for gas imports. ADNOC Sour Gas is 60% owned by ADNOC with the remaining equity held by Occidental. It is previously known as Abu Dhabi Gas Development Company Limited (Al Hosn Gas).

=== Processing, refining and chemicals ===
==== ADNOC Gas Processing ====
ADNOC Gas Processing (formerly known as GASCO) is a natural gas producing company and the largest gas processing complex in Abu Dhabi. The company was established in 1975. It was formerly known as Abu Dhabi Gas Industries Limited (GASCO). ADNOC Gas Processing is a subsidiary of the ADNOC, which owns 68% stake in the company. Other shareholders are Shell Abu Dhabi (15%), Total SA (15%) and Partex (2%). The company was established in 1975. The company's current CEO is Sultan Ahmed Al Jaber. Shayma Al Mazrouei, Environment Department Team Leader in ADNOC Gas Processing's Environment, health and safety (HSE), Division, received the Sustainability Manager of the Year Award 2020 for her continuous contribution to environmental conservations through an innovative water reduction program.

It manages over 3,000 km (1,900 mi) of pipeline network and 26 processing trains. In 2000 ADNOC Gas Processing started a $1.5 billion tender for its gas terminals expansion. ADNOC launched a Downstream Investment Forum in 2018, which attracted more foreign investments for the Ruwais Refinery. For the last 40 years, the ADNOC has been refining Murban grade crude, which is extracted from its onshore fields in the Emirate of Abu Dhabi. The "Crude Flexibility Project" (CFP) has made significant progress in 2020, with the ADNOC having a 73% project delivery which is constantly increasing from the refining capabilities in Ruwais. The CFP is to be completed in mid-2022, allowing the ADNOC to process up to 420,000 bpsd (Barrels per Stream Day) of the heavier grades of crude oil at the Ruwais refinery, which processes in total 840,000 bpsd. The necessary physical infrastructure required for the CFP has been put into place, only the structural elements such as two new fractionators and 24 atmospheric residue desulfurizer reactors were installed in the months of June and July 2020.

ADNOC signed two EPC contracts in 2020, one with Petrofac Emirates LLC, a subsidiary of Petrofac Ltd., and the other with a joint venture with Petrofac and Sapura Energy Bhd. for the development of ADNOC's Dalma gas development project. Together, the contracts are valued to be worth over $1.65 billion, and they are scheduled to be completed by 2022.

ADNOC introduced a new category in its enterprise HSE Awards for energy management to recognize efforts made by companies, employees and contractors. This award helps to promote energy awareness and increase the involvement and accountability of individuals.

ADNOC Gas was ranked 11th on Forbes Middle East's Top 100 Listed Companies 2025 list.

==== ADNOC LNG ====
ADNOC LNG processes and distributes liquefied petroleum gas and liquified natural gas. ADNOC Gas Processing supplies products to ADNOC LNG at Das Island where it is processed and loaded on ships for export to East Asia, especially Japan. ADNOC is the majority shareholder. Minority shares are held by Mitsui, BP, and Total. It is formerly called Abu Dhabi Gas Liquefaction Co. Limited (ADGAS).

==== ADNOC Refining ====
ADNOC Refining was created in 1999 to take over oil refining from ADNOC. ADNOC Refining refines crude oil and condensate, various petroleum products, and granulated sulphur. It operates the Ruwais and Abu Dhabi refineries. In 2015, it completed a major expansion of its Ruwais Refinery. The $10 billion project doubled the capacity of the facility. A large part of the increased output is dedicated to diesel production due to demand from Asia. Ruwais has the ability to refine 600,000 tonnes of high-quality base oils per year. These oils are used primarily for automotive lubricants. It is previously known as Abu Dhabi Oil Refining Company (TAKREER).

In 2024, ADNOC increased its crude production capacity to 4.85 million barrels per day from 4.65 million in 2023. The company plans to increase production to 5 million barrels per day by 2027.

==== Fertiglobe ====
In September 2019 Fertiglobe was formed as a result of the merger of ADNOC Fertilizers, (established in 1980) with Dutch firm OCI's Middle East nitrogen fertilizer business. ADNOC has a 42% stake in the new business.

==== ADNOC Industrial Gas ====
ADNOC Industrial Gas was founded in 2007. It manufactures industrial gas used in the oil, gas, and petrochemical industries. ADNOC Industrial Gas works very closely with ADNOC Gas Processing. The firm is a joint venture between ADNOC and the Linde Group of Germany. ADNOC holds 51% equity with the remainder held by Linde. It is formerly known as ADNOC Linde Industrial Gases Company Limited (ELIXIER).

==== Abu Dhabi Polymers Company (Borouge) ====
Borouge is a manufacturer of polyolefins. It is a joint venture of ADNOC and Borealis of Austria. It was founded in 1998, and has two divisions, one based in Abu Dhabi and another based in Singapore. The company supplies polyolefin plastics (polyethylene and polypropylene). They focus on differentiated high-end applications in the Middle East and Asia Pacific with Borstar Enhanced Polyethylene produced in Abu Dhabi and the Borealis range of specialty products.

In March 2025, ADNOC and OMV agreed to combine Borouge and Borealis to create the Borouge Group International and it will acquire Nova Chemicals for $13.4 billion. The chemical plant will be headquartered in Vienna, Austria.

==== XRG ====
In November 2024, the ADNOC launched XRG as an $80 billion international investment company focusing on low-carbon energy and chemicals. The company will focus on developing three core platforms, global chemicals, low carbon energies and international gas.

=== Marketing and distribution ===
==== ADNOC Logistics & Services ====
ADNOC Logistics & Services was formed by merging ESNAAD, IRSHAD, and ADNATCO. ADNOC Logistics & Services is 100% owned by ADNOC. The new company has a workforce of about 4,000 people.

In August 2020, Chinese company Wanhua partnered with ADNOC Logistics and Services to create AW Shipping Ltd., which owns and operates product tankers and a flotilla of very large gas carriers (VLGCs). AW Shipping delivers liquefied petroleum gas (LPG) from ADNOC and other global suppliers to Wanhua's sites in China and globally. In November 2018, a 10-year contract for (LPG) supply was forged between the companies.

==== ADNOC Distribution ====
ADNOC Distribution (ADNOCDIS:UH) operates hundreds of service stations across the UAE, provides bunkering services at Zayed Port, aviation fuel services at most of the country's airports, and sells its own brand of lubricants throughout the Gulf region. In September 2020 ADNOC completed "the largest block placement of a publicly listed" company in the Gulf region valued at $1 billion. The placement, which was aimed at institutional investors, increased the subsidiary's free float to 20%.

==== Abu Dhabi Crude Oil Pipeline LLC ====
Abu Dhabi Crude Oil Pipeline LLC (ADCOP) owns a 406-kilometre (252 mi) pipeline that carries crude oil from an ADNOC Onshore collection center in Abu Dhabi to the Fujairah oil export terminal, which provides access to international shipping routes.

== See also ==
- Asab oil field
- Emirates National Oil Company (ENOC)
- International Petroleum Investment Company
- List of oil exploration and production companies
- Mubadala Investment Company
- Abu Dhabi Investment Authority
