= Murban Bab oil field =

Oil field in the United Arab Emirates

Murban Bab Oil Field
- Country: United Arab Emirates
- Region: Persian Gulf
- Offshore/onshore: onshore
- Operator: Abu Dhabi National Oil Company

Field history
- Discovery: 1953
- Start of production: 1958

Production
- Current production of oil: 250,000 barrels per day (~1.2×10^{7} t/a)
- Estimated oil in place: 1448 million tonnes (~ 1.634×10^{9} m^{3} or 10280 million bbl)
- Estimated gas in place: 29,300×10^{9} cu ft (830×10^{9} m^{3})

The Murban Bab Oil Field is an oil field in Abu Dhabi. It was discovered in 1953 and developed by Abu Dhabi National Oil Company. The oil field is operated and owned by Abu Dhabi National Oil Company. The total proven reserves of the Murban Bab oil field are around 10.3 billion barrels (1.45 billion tonnes), and production is centered on 250,000 barrels per day (40,000 m^{3}/d).
