= Asab oil field =

Oilfield in United Arab Emirates

Asab Oil Field
- Country: United Arab Emirates
- Region: Persian Gulf
- Offshore/onshore: onshore
- Coordinates: 23.28793°N 54.22931°E
- Operator: Abu Dhabi National Oil Company

Field history
- Discovery: 1965
- Start of production: 1970

Production
- Current production of oil: 450,000 barrels per day (~2.2×10^{7} t/a)
- Estimated oil in place: 507 million tonnes (~ 570×10^{6} m^{3} or 3600 million bbl)

The Asab Oil Field (Arabic: حقل عصب النفطي) is an oil field in the Emirate of Abu Dhabi. It was discovered in 1965 and developed by Abu Dhabi National Oil Company. This oil field is operated and owned by Abu Dhabi National Oil Company. The total proven reserves of the Asab oil field are around 3.6 billion barrels (507 million tonnes), and production is centered on 450,000 barrels per day (72,000 m^{3}/d).
