= Interzero Holding =

Environmental service provider

Interzero Holding GmbH & Co. KG
- Company type: GmbH & Co. KG
- Industry: Recycling, waste disposal, environment, circular economy
- Founded: 1991
- Headquarters: Berlin
- Revenue: 734.5 million euros (2023)
- Number of employees: 1,828 (2023)
- Website: www.interzero.de

Interzero Holding GmbH & Co. KG is a provider of environmental services with its registered office in Berlin and its actual headquarters in Cologne. Interzero Holding also includes Interzero Circular Solutions Germany GmbH (formerly Interseroh Dienstleistungs GmbH), based in Cologne. Until 2021, this company operated as Duales System in Germany and was part of the Alba Group.

== History ==
=== 1991–2021 ===
A group of waste management companies founded the Interseroh AG in Cologne in 1991. The company's objective was to recycle secondary raw materials as a guarantor for the Dual System Germany and to develop industry solutions to ensure the return and recycling of transport packaging in the material cycle.

Historical logo

The business model was based on the Packaging Ordinance of 12 June 1991. With this ordinance, the legislator required manufacturers and distributors of packaging to take back, recycle and dispose of their products after use. For the practical implementation of the ordinance, the Dual System Germany was initially introduced as a monopoly in the Federal Republic of Germany in 1990.

In 1993, Interseroh AG outsourced its operational business to Interseroh Dienstleistungs GmbH. From 1994 onwards, Interseroh expanded its business model and entered the metal and steel recycling sector, which developed into the company's second mainstay. This area was expanded in the following years. With the acquisition of Hansa Recycling GmbH, Dortmund, in 2001, Interseroh moved up from fifth to third place among the largest steel recycling companies in Germany.

In 1997, Interseroh expanded outside Germany with the establishment of its Austrian subsidiary EVA Erfassen und Verwerten von Altstoffen GmbH (EVA Collection and recycling of waste materials GmbH) as a system operator for Austria. Today, this company operates under the name Interseroh Austria GmbH.

In 2000, Interseroh took over Die Grüne Umweltbox (The Green Environment Box) take-back system for the collection of empty toner cartridges and mobile phones in companies, schools and kindergartens.

In 2004, the recycling company was granted permission to take back packaging waste, initially in Hamburg, in competition with Duales System Deutschland AG (DSD). The previous monopoly holder in the waste business, DSD, filed an unsuccessful lawsuit against this decision. Another waste disposal company, Landbell AG in Hesse, had already received approval to dispose of private waste. This meant that DSD no longer had its original monopoly position. When Baden-Württemberg became the last federal state to open up the waste disposal market to other companies in 2006, Interseroh GmbH was able to become active nationwide as a dual system.

In 2005, with the approval of the Federal Cartel Office, Interseroh was able to increase its share in Westpfand Clearing GmbH, the first deposit system for single-use beverage packaging on the German market, to 51 per cent. Together with Deutsche Pfand-Konzept GmbH, this resulted in the creation of Interseroh Pfand-System GmbH. Since then, it has been involved in the processing of goods and cash flows for single-use deposits. In 2008, the company was converted into a European public limited company (SE), operating under the name Interseroh SE. In the same year, it entered into a partnership with the waste disposal and recycling company Alba. In 2011, the metal and steel division was placed under the umbrella of the Alba Group. In the same year, Interseroh shareholders approved a control and profit and loss transfer agreement between Alba Group plc & Co. KG and Interseroh SE and decided in 2012 to rename Interseroh AG as Alba SE. This acts as an intermediate holding company for the Alba Group, but has retained its stock market listing. At the end of 2020, the free float was 6.9%.

Within the Alba Group, Interseroh represents the Services segment, which specialises in waste prevention, product recycling, packaging take-back, the provision of secondary raw materials and reusable solutions. In 2016, the Chinese family-owned company Techcent acquired 60 per cent of this division from the Alba Group. Techcent then had to file for insolvency in 2021 and sold the shares back to the Alba Group.

=== From 2022 ===
In 2022, brothers Eric and Axel Schweitzer divided the company between themselves. Eric Schweitzer took over the holding company, which retained the recycling of paper, steel, metal and wood, and then changed its name to Alba Europe Holding. Axel Schweitzer took over plastics recycling and all related services and merged them into the newly founded Interzero GmbH & Co. KG. While the original name Interseroh was an acronym for Internationale Sekundärrohstoffe (International Secondary Raw Materials), the new name stands for International Zero Waste Solutions.

== Company ==
Interzero Holding GmbH & Co. KG (IHKG), based in Berlin, is the parent company of the Interzero Group. Interzero's business model is based on recycling systems, plastics recycling and sorting, the dual system Interzero Recycling Alliance (IRA) and the trade in raw materials and recyclates.

=== Business areas ===
The newly established Interzero Holding in 2022 had three core business areas with a total of 61 subsidiaries in 10 European countries.

=== Interzero Circular Solutions (ICS) ===
Circular solutions, turnover in 2023: €310 million (total) / €212 million (Germany) - Services for the recycling of valuable materials: Development and operation of take-back systems for packaging, products and materials, as well as customer-specific circular systems for companies.

=== Interzero Plastics Recycling (IPR) ===
Plastics recycling, turnover in 2023: €237 million (total) / ~€171 million (Germany) - Operation of sorting and recycling plants, production and marketing of recycled plastics. The sorting plant in Marl processes up to 200,000 tonnes of light packaging waste annually.

=== Interzero Recycling Alliance (IRA) ===
The dual system, formerly Interseroh+, turnover in 2023: €187 million (total) / €165 million (Germany) – collection, sorting and recycling of sales packaging. Return of packaging to the recycling cycle.

== Sponsorship ==
Interzero is the main sponsor of Alba Berlin, one of Germany's largest basketball clubs. In addition to the men's Bundesliga team, Interzero is also a partner of the women's basketball team. Interzero also supports the non-profit organisation Mission to Marsh, which is committed to protecting moors.

== Innovations and awards ==
- 2012 Cologne Entrepreneur Award
- 2013 Industry Award from the ‘Initiative Mittelstand’ in the category of services
- 2017 Slovenian Environmental Award
- 2019 Plastics Recycling Award Europe in the category ‘Recycling Machinery Innovation of the Year’
- 2024 German Sustainability Award in the category ‘Waste Management and Recycling’ and the special award in the transformation field ‘Resources’
