= Mubadala Investment Company =

United Arab Emirates sovereign wealth fund

Mubadala Investment Company PJSC
- Native name: شركة مبادلة للاستثمار
- Type: Private Joint Stock Company (Government owned)
- Industry: Private equity Investment management
- Founded: January 2017; 9 years ago
- Headquarters: Abu Dhabi, United Arab Emirates
- Key people: Mansour bin Zayed Al Nahyan (chairman); Khaldoon Khalifa Al Mubarak (CEO & Managing Director)
- AUM: US$330 billion (2024)
- Owner: Government of Abu Dhabi
- Subsidiaries: Abu Dhabi Investment Council; Clear Channel Outdoor (50%); Concessão Metroviária do Rio de Janeiro; Dolphin Energy; Fortress Investment Group; GlobalFoundries; International Petroleum Investment Company; Mamoura Diversified Global Holding; Masdar; Nova Chemicals
- Website: www.mubadala.com

Mubadala Investment Company PJSC (Arabic: شركة مبادلة للاستثمار), or simply Mubadala, is a state-owned global investment firm that acts as one of the sovereign wealth funds of the government of Abu Dhabi. The company was established in 2017 when then-named Mubadala Development Company (now Mamoura Diversified Global Holding) and the International Petroleum Investment Company (IPIC) merged. Headquartered in Abu Dhabi, Mubadala also has offices in London, Rio de Janeiro, New York, San Francisco and Beijing.

== History ==
Established in 1984, the International Petroleum Investment Company (IPIC) was created to advance Abu Dhabi's natural petroleum wealth for the development of the emirate. Mubadala Development Company followed in 2002 to further diversify the economy. In June 2016, it was announced that Mubadala Development Company would merge with the International Petroleum Investment Company. In 2017, ownership of both MDC and IPIC was transferred to a newly created parent company, Mubadala Investment Company. The company is a wholly owned investment vehicle of the government of Abu Dhabi, and Sheikh Mansour bin Zayed Al Nahyan, vice-president and deputy prime minister of the United Arab Emirates, is chairman of the company.

== Investments ==
Mubadala has invested in logistics software startup Turvo, Alphabet-owned self-driving technology company Waymo, Reliance Jio Platforms, UK life sciences company Envision, and Telegram. Mubadala is a parent company of GlobalFoundries, a semiconductor foundry company.

In 2007 Mubadala announced an initial investment in AMD. As of 2017 Mubadala had a stake of 12.9 percent in the chipmaker. In 2019 Mubadala sold its entire stake in AMD.

Mubadala owns stakes in numerous companies, including a 7.5 percent share in the Carlyle Group.

In 2016, Mubadala became the biggest external shareholder at Investcorp, after acquiring 20% stakes in the Bahraini firm. In 2023, a former UK minister, Gerry Grimstone was criticized for conducting and not declaring 13 meetings with Mubadala and Khaldoon al-Mubarak, after acquiring the role as an adviser and the chair of planned climate fund at Investcorp. In March 2021, Grimstone finalized a deal between the UK and Mubadala, allowing it to oversee investment of around £10 billion in the UK from the UAE. A senior research officer at Transparency International UK, Rose Whiffen said if a minister is working for a firm and meeting its shareholder several times while in office, it should be declared or assessed before approval.

In 2019, Mubadala and Falcon Edge Capital established Abu Dhabi Catalyst Partners, a $1 billion joint venture to invest in financial institutions. In November 2020, Mubadala transferred ownership of two information technology companies it previously owned, Injazat and Khazna, to artificial intelligence company, G42, and took a stake in G42.

A unit of the company, Mubadala Capital, invested €50 million in the Novalpina Capital private equity fund of €1 billion, which bought the Israeli security company NSO Group in 2019. Reports revealed that the UAE targeted human rights activists, journalists, and Princess Haya using the Pegasus spyware, during the same time. Mubadala Capital got a seat on Novalpina's committee of largest investors.

In 2021, Mubadala purchased a 2.6% stake in En+ Group, a manufacturer of green aluminum, from Polina Yumasheva, the former wife of Russian businessman Oleg Deripaska. The same year, Mubadala purchased MetrôRio, the company that holds the operations for the Rio de Janeiro metro, from Invepar.

In 2021, Mubadala invested in wefox, a German digital insurance platform, through a $650 million funding round and led another $400 million round in 2022.

In May 2022, Mubadala Investment Company signed a preliminary agreement with French utility Engie for the development of a digital platform to charge electric vehicles in the UAE and across the Middle East. The two companies would also explore areas related to sustainable mobility.

In 2022, Mubadala sold the Anglo-Trade Bank, which it funded together with AGTB Holdings in 2018, to Gulf Islamic Investments. In April 2023 Mubadala, together with Stone Point Capital and other partners, acquired 20% of Truist Insurance Holdings for $1.95 billion. The fund bought the remaining 80% of Truist, together with Stone Point Capital, Clayton, Dubilier & Rice and other investors, for $15.5 billion in 2024.

In May 2023, Mubadala agreed to buy a majority stake in a New York–based Fortress Investment Group from the SoftBank Group. The $3 billion takeover was intended to be closed in the first quarter of 2024. However, the deal that would give Mubadala 70% stakes in Fortress was being scrutinized by the U.S. national security officers. The deal, which raised concerns for the US over the UAE's ties with China, was being closely reviewed by the Committee on Foreign Investment in the US (Cfius). In May 2024, the regulatory body approved of the sale. A year later in April 2025, Mubadala and Fortress Investment started a $1 billion investment partnership.

Mubadala increased its partnership with Aldar Properties in September 2024 with four joint ventures amounting to more than $8.2 billion across Abu Dhabi.

In September 2024, Turkish Competition Authority confirmed that Mubadala applied to acquire Getir in entirety. In June 2024, Getir founders, Nazim Salur and Serkan Borancili, opposed Mubadala's restructuring plan that would separate profitable local grocery delivery operations with noncore businesses. Under the proposed plan, Mubadala was to acquire grocery delivery operations in exchange for $250 million investment. However, in January 2025, Salur alleged Mubadala of an “illegal coup” and vowed to take legal action against the Emirati firm. He claimed that Mubadala attempted to take over all shares of the founders, and “intentionally delayed” transferring units to them. Getir's founders also stated that Mubadala attempted to back off from the deal at the end of 2024. They appealed to the Enterprise Chamber of the Amsterdam Court of Appeal, and said to take a legal action in Turkey and the UK as well. Mubadala was planning to propose an alternative plan, which it said was already approved by Getir's independent directors. But Salur expressed his intent to “continue fighting” the restructuring plan. On 30 January 2025, Salur removed Getir's CEO Batuhan Gultakan from his position without giving specific reasons. Sources revealed that the move was taken due to Gultakan's full support towards Mubadala.

In December 2024, Mubadala announced a partnership with Silver Rock Financial LP in which Mubadala Capital acquired a 42% stake in the company.

Mubadala Capital acquired the Canadian asset manager CI Financial Corp. in August 2025 for $8.9 billion. Also in August 2025, Mubadala invested $35 million for a 12.8% stake into Paragraf, a British technology company.

Mubadala Capital acquired the outdoor advertising company Clear Channel Outdoor in February 2026 for $6.2 billion.

== Investment platforms ==
Mubadala operates through four investment platforms of significant scale.

- Direct Investments platform
- UAE Investments platform
- Disruptive Investments platform
- Real Estate & Infrastructure Investments platform

== Mubadala Technology ==
Mubadala Technology
- Founded: 2014
- Successor: Advanced Technology Investment Company (ATIC)
- Headquarters: Abu Dhabi, UAE
- Key people: Ibrahim Ajami (CEO)
- Parent: Mubadala Investment Company

The company's Advanced Technology Investment Company (ATIC) in 2008, is an investment company in the high-technology sector. ATIC owns the semiconductor foundry companies GlobalFoundries, and Chartered Semiconductor Manufacturing (which later merged with GlobalFoundries). ATIC has invested in Calxeda, a start-up company for producing ARM architecture–based computers for the server market. In 2011, ATIC announced investments of $5.5 billion to expand chip manufacturing in Singapore, Dresden, and New York. It also announced a $6–$8 billion computer chip factory in Abu Dhabi for completion in 2012. The company supports research initiatives in Khalifa University, UAE University, American University of Sharjah, Masdar Institute and New York University Abu Dhabi. In 2014, ATIC became Mubadala Technology.

== Mubadala Energy ==
Mubadala Energy (formerly Mubadala Petroleum) plans to expand into liquefied natural gas, blue hydrogen, and carbon capture. Mubadala Energy works in eleven markets and employs over 500 people. In April 2025, Mubadala Energy acquired a 24.1% stake in Kimmeridge SoTex HoldCo.
