= Ministries of the United Arab Emirates =

This is a list of ministries in the United Arab Emirates.

== List of ministries ==
No.	Ministry	Minister	Image	Founded	Website
1	Ministry of Education وزارة التربية والتعليم	Sarah Al Amiri		1972	moe.gov.ae/en
2	Ministry of Interior وزارة الداخلية	Saif bin Zayed Al Nahyan		1971	moi.gov.ae/en/
3	Ministry of Foreign Affairs وزارة الخارجية	Abdullah bin Zayed Al Nahyan		1971	www.mofa.gov.ae/en
4	Ministry of Finance وزارة المالية	Maktoum bin Mohammed Al Maktoum		1971	www.mof.gov.ae/en
5	Ministry of Defense وزارة الدفاع	Hamdan bin Mohammed Al Maktoum		1971	mod.gov.ae
6	Presidential Court, formerly (Ministry of Presidential Affairs) ديوان الرئاسة	Mansour bin Zayed Al Nahyan		1971	diwan.gov.ae/en
7	Ministry of Energy and Infrastructure وزارة الطاقة والبنية التحتية	Suhail Al Mazrouei		2020	moei.gov.ae/en
8	Ministry of Health and Prevention وزارة الصحة	Abdul Rahman Mohammed Al Oweis		1971	www.mohap.gov.ae/en/
9	Ministry of Tolerance and Coexistence وزارة التسامح والتعايش	Nahyan bin Mubarak Al Nahyan		2016	tolerance.gov.ae
10	Ministry of Cabinet Affairs وزارة شؤون مجلس الوزراء	Mohammed Abdullah Al Gergawi		2006	www.moca.gov.ae/en/home
11	Ministry of Industry and Advanced Technology وزارة الصناعة والتكنولوجيا المتقدمة	Sultan Ahmed Al Jaber		2020	moiat.gov.ae/en
12	Ministry of Sports وزارة الرياضة	Dr. Ahmad Belhoul Al Falasi		2024	www.sports.gov.ae/en
13	Ministry of Community Empowerment وزارة تمكين المجتمع	Shamma Al Mazrui		2006	www.moce.gov.ae/en/home
14	Ministry of Economy & Tourism وزارة الاقتصاد والسياحة	Abdulla bin Touq Al Marri		2020	www.hrsd.gov.sa/en
15	Ministry of Justice وزارة العدل	Abdullah Sultan Al Nuaimi		1972	www.moj.gov.ae
16	Ministry of Human Resources and Emiratisation وزارة الموارد البشرية والتوطين	Abdulrahman Abdulmannan Al Awar		2004	www.mohre.gov.ae/en
17	Ministry of State for Federal National Council Affairs وزارة الدولة لشؤون المجلس الوطني الاتحادي	Abdulrahman Bin Mohamed Al Owais		2006	www.mfnca.gov.ae/en
18	Ministry of Culture وزارة الثقافة	Salem bin Khalid Al Qassimi		1972	moc.gov.ae/en/
19	Ministry of Investment وزارة الاستثمار	Mohamed Hassan Al Suwaidi		2023	www.investuae.gov.ae/en
20	Ministry of Family وزارة الأسرة	Sana bint Mohammed Suhail		2024	alusra.gov.ae/en/
21	Ministry of Climate Change and Environment وزارة التغير والمناخي والبيئة	Amna bint Abdullah Al Dahak Al Shamsi		2006	www.moccae.gov.ae/en
