= Sardar Azmoun =

Iranian footballer (born 1995)

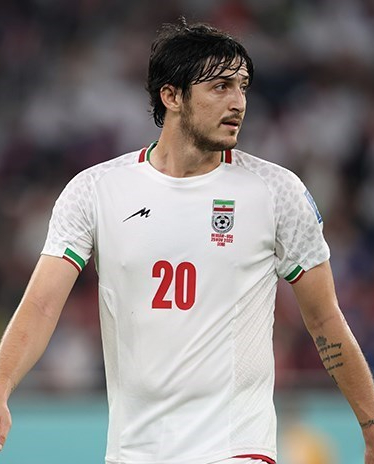
- Azmoun with Iran in 2022

Personal information
- Full name: Sardar Azmoun
- Date of birth: 1 January 1995 (age 31)
- Place of birth: Gonbad-e Kavus, Iran
- Height: 1.86 m (6 ft 1 in)
- Position: Striker

Team information
- Current team: Shabab Al Ahli
- Number: 20

Youth career
- 2004–2008: Oghab Gonbad
- 2008–2009: Shamoshak Gorgan
- 2009–2010: Etka Gorgan
- 2010–2013: Sepahan

Senior career*
Years	Team	Apps	(Gls)
2013–2016	Rubin Kazan	27	(5)
2015–2016	→ Rostov (loan)	35	(12)
2016–2017	Rostov	27	(7)
2017–2019	Rubin Kazan	40	(9)
2019–2022	Zenit Saint Petersburg	79	(52)
2022–2024	Bayer Leverkusen	32	(5)
2023–2024	→ Roma (loan)	23	(3)
2024–	Shabab Al Ahli	23	(12)

International career
2009–2011	Iran U17	6	(7)
2011–2015	Iran U20	19	(19)
2015	Iran U23	4	(4)
2014–	Iran	95	(58)
Medal record
Representing Iran
CAFA Nations Cup
Winner	2023 Kyrgyzstan – Uzbekistan	Team
AFF U-19 Youth Championship
Winner	2012 Vietnam
WAFF U-15 Championship
Winner	2009 Jordan
- * Club domestic league appearances and goals as of 00:10, 17 November 2026 (UTC)

Sardar Azmoun (Persian: سردار آزمون, romanized: Sardâr Âzmun; born 1 January 1995) is an Iranian professional footballer who plays as a striker for UAE Pro League club Shabab Al Ahli and the Iran national team.

Azmoun made his debut for the Iran national team in 2014 aged 19. He has been a regular with Team Melli, playing in the 2015, 2019 and 2023 editions of the AFC Asian Cup, as well as the 2018 and 2022 editions of the FIFA World Cup.

After Alireza Jahanbakhsh, Azmoun is the second-most expensive Iranian player of all-time. He was also the youngest Iranian to score in a UEFA Champions League match.

== Club career ==
=== Early years ===
According to Sardar, he was first introduced to the sport when he started to kick some balls on a family trip in Turkmenistan when he was 9. He began his career at Oghab Gonbad of Gonbad-e Kavus. He also played volleyball and was invited to Iran's national under-15 volleyball team. After some years, he joined Shamoushak Gorgan, before joining Etka Gorgan, who were playing in Division 1 (the second tier) in Iran at the time.

=== Sepahan ===
At age 15, Azmoun joined Sepahan's youth ranks. While he appeared for the club during their pre-season friendlies abroad in Turkey, he did not make a professional appearance for the club as Sepahan won the 2011–12 Iran Pro League and lifted the trophy.

During the 2012–13 season, thanks to Azmoun's great display in Iran's youth team, Sardar became sought after by a couple of European clubs, namely Rubin Kazan. Azmoun became Iran's youngest Legionnaire when later that year he transferred to Rubin Kazan at the age of 17.

=== Rubin Kazan ===
==== 2012–13 season ====
In January 2013, Azmoun received an offer from Russian team Rubin Kazan to join them; meanwhile he had interest from two Iranian teams, Persepolis and Esteghlal, as well as an offer for first team contract in Sepahan. He chose to work with Turkmen speaking Kurban Berdyev and became Iran's first football player in the Russian Premier League. In his first season at the club, he made eight appearances for his club's reserve team, scoring two goals and receiving one yellow card. He was also picked for the 18-man match day squad on a number of occasions, but failed to make his senior debut.

==== 2013–14 season ====
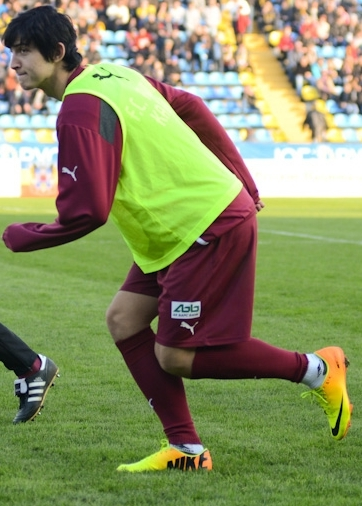
Azmoun in training with Rubin Kazan

On 25 July 2013, Azmoun made his debut for the senior team in a UEFA Europa League match against Jagodina, coming on as a 73rd-minute substitute as Rubin won 1–0. On 29 August, he scored his first goal in just his second senior appearance for Rubin in a 3–0 Europa League win against Molde, coming on as a substitute in the 64th minute. He made his league debut with a goal and an assist on 6 October 2013, coming on as a substitute in the 72nd minute in a 5–1 win over Anzhi Makhachkala.

On 27 March 2014, English Premier League side Arsenal reportedly made a £2 million offer to Kazan for the transfer of 19-year-old Azmoun, sparking interest from A.C. Milan, Juventus, Liverpool, Tottenham, and Barcelona as well.

Three days later, he scored his second league goal for Rubin Kazan in a 2–1 defeat to Rostov. On 6 April, he scored a goal in Rubin Kazan's defeat to Zenit St. Petersburg. In a match against Krylia Sovetov on 10 May, Azmoun came on as a substitute in the 55th minute, scoring a goal and providing an assist in a 4–0 win.

==== 2014–15 season ====
On 4 July 2014, Rubin Kazan announced through their official website that Azmoun would remain at the club despite transfer offers from Arsenal, Liverpool and Zenit St. Petersburg. He scored Rubin Kazan's goal in a 1–1 draw against Hellas Verona in a pre-season friendly match on 27 July 2014. He scored his first goal of the season in a 1–1 draw against Terek Grozny in the 87th minute. On 30 October, he scored a goal in their victory over Spartak Moscow in the 2014–15 Russian Cup.

=== Rostov ===
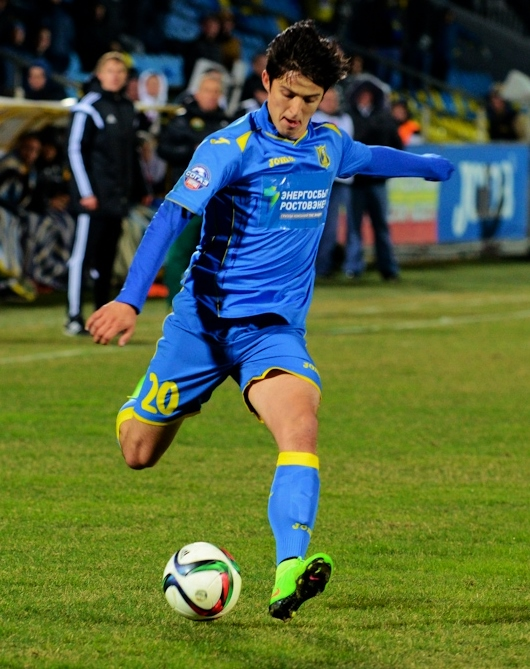
Azmoun playing for Rostov against Kuban Krasnodar on 16 March 2015

On 26 February 2015, Azmoun signed a three-and-a-half-month loan deal with relegation-battling Russian Premier League club FC Rostov until the end of the season. On 16 March, Azmoun came on as a substitute in the 73rd minute and scored the match winner in the 88th minute against Kuban Krasnodar. Azmoun again found the back of the net on 26 April 2015 in Rostov's 2–2 draw against Dynamo Moscow. His good performance earned him a place on the Russian Premier League Team of the Week. He scored Rostov's winning goal in the relegation play-offs on 7 June.

==== 2015–16 season ====
At the end of the 2014–15 season, Azmoun extended his loan deal with Rostov until the end of the 2015–16 season. He scored his first goal of the season on 22 August 2015 in a 2–1 loss to CSKA Moscow. After his good performances in the first half of the season, he was linked with English Premier League club Stoke City. Later in March 2016 he was also linked with a move to English side Everton.

After a long goalless drought, Azmoun scored in Rostov's 3–0 win against Zenit Saint Petersburg on 24 April 2016. He scored a brace in a 3–1 victory over Dynamo Moscow on 12 May 2016, which kept Rostov in second place and in contention for the Russian Premier League championship. On 16 May 2016 with his goal, Rostov defeated Ural Sverdlovskaya Oblast 1–0 and clinched at least an UEFA Champions League play–off spot for the 2016–17 season. His goal against Ural was his fifth consecutive game with a goal which included six goals in five games.

On the last day of the Russian Premier League on 21 May 2016 needing a win and CSKA Moscow to drop points to become champions, Azmoun assisted Rostov's first goal in their 2–0 win against Terek Grozny. However, CSKA won their match and Rostov finished as runners up, thus securing a UEFA Champions League playoff spot.

Azmoun finished seventh in league scoring with nine goals, despite getting half as much playing time as some other top scorers. He was also voted as the fifth most valuable player of the league, narrowly behind players such as Fyodor Smolov, Moussa Doumbia, and Brazilian superstar Hulk.

==== 2016–17 season ====
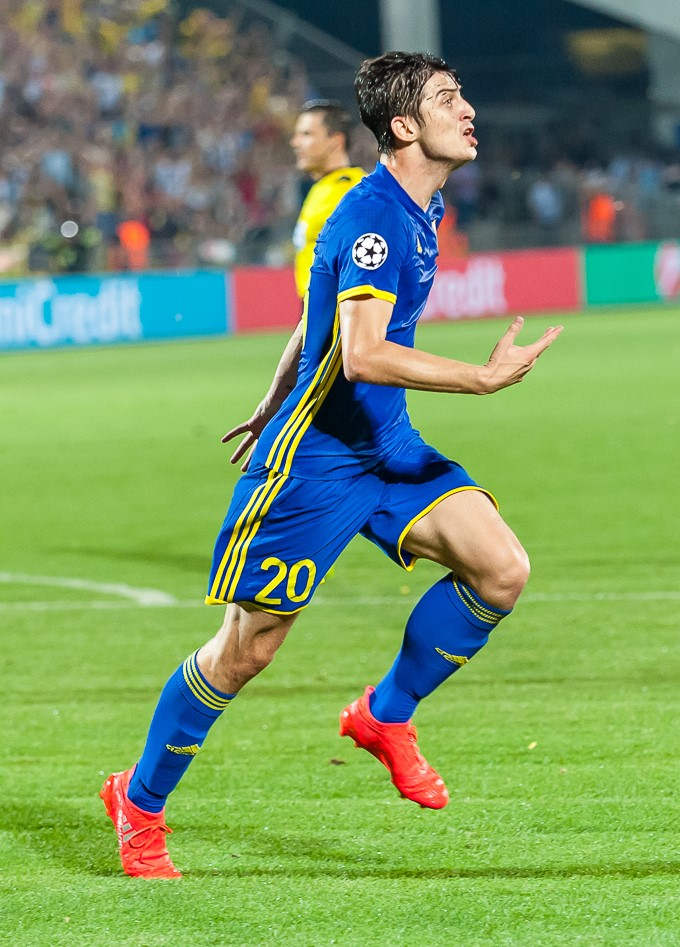
Azmoun in a match against Ajax in 2016

Initially it was announced that Azmoun would return to Rubin Kazan. However, Rostov triggered the buy out clause in Azmoun's contract. Rubin Kazan denied this clause and claimed Azmoun was their player. Rubin lodged a complaint with FIFA. FC Rostov filed a counter-complaint with the Court of Arbitration for Sport, and on 22 July 2016 CAS temporarily ruled in favour of Azmoun and he was included in Rostov's UEFA Champions League squad. According to Rostov's lawyer Yuri Zaytsev, the final CAS decision on his status might not be reached until late 2016 or even the summer of 2017.

Azmoun made his Champions League debut on 26 July 2016 in the first leg of a third-round qualifying round match against Anderlecht at Olimp – 2, coming on for Aleksandr Bukharov at the 56th minute. He started in the return leg on 3 August 2016 and scored his first Champions League goal in the 47th minute, helping Rostov advance 4–2 on aggregate. He scored his second Champions League goal on 24 August 2016 in the return leg of the playoff round match against Ajax, scoring the opening goal in a 4–1 victory which resulted in Rostov advancing to the group stage of the Champions League for the first time. Azmoun scored on 1 November 2016 in a Rostov's 2–1 Champions League group stage loss against Atlético Madrid. In the process, he became the first Iranian to score in the Champions League group stage since Ali Karimi in 2005. On 23 November 2016, Azmoun scored his second Champions League goal in the group stage against Bayern Munich at home, leading Rostov to a 3–2 victory and their first ever official Champions League group stage win.

After his good performances and goals in the UEFA Champions League, Azmoun drew interest from European giants such as Marseille, Liverpool, Arsenal, Borussia Dortmund, and Bayer Leverkusen.

On 6 November 2016, Azmoun scored his first Russian Premier League goal of the 2016–17 season in a 4–1 victory. He scored his second goal of the season on 28 November against Anzhi Makhachkala. On 26 January 2017, FIFA rejected appeals by Rubin Kazan related to Azmoun's transfer to Rostov and ruled that there were no obligations outstanding towards Rubin. On 3 March 2017, in the first league game after the end of the winter break, Azmoun scored twice in a 6–0 victory against Tom Tomsk. He scored another brace against his former side Rubin Kazan.

After the end of the 2016–17 season, Azmoun received interest from Scottish side Celtic, English Premier League club Everton, and La Liga side Valencia.

=== Return to Rubin Kazan ===
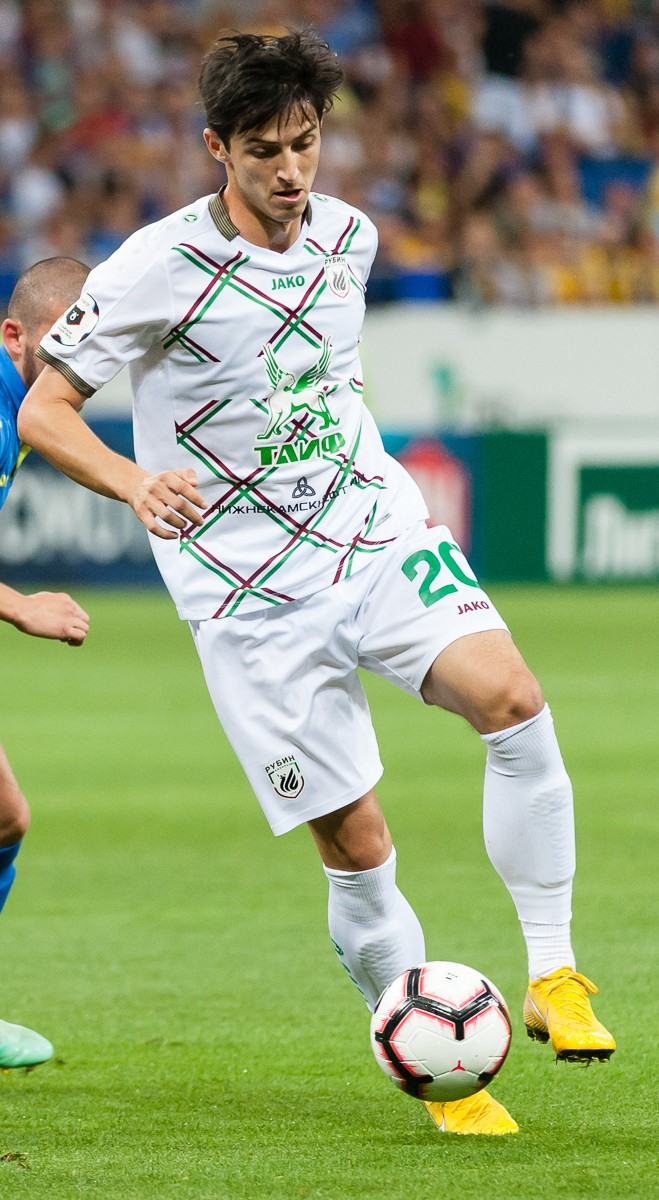
Azmoun playing for Rubin Kazan in 2017

In June 2017, Azmoun returned to Rubin Kazan. He appeared in a friendly on 28 June 2017 as a second-half substitute, wearing number 69. FC Rostov confirmed the transfer agreement with Rubin on 14 July 2017.

=== Zenit Saint Petersburg ===
On 1 February 2019, he signed a 3.5-year contract with Zenit St. Petersburg. Sardar scored two goals and registered one assist in his debut start for Zenit against Fenerbahçe in the Round of 32 in the UEFA Europa League. He was chosen as the Player of the Week for his outstanding performance by UEFA. On 2 March 2019, he scored the only goal of the game to give Zenit a 1–0 victory over Ural Yekaterinburg in his Russian Premier League debut for the team. On 31 March 2019, in a home game he doubled against FC Orenburg. On 17 September 2019, Azmoun scored the first goal of the 2019–20 UEFA Champions League group stage in his Champions League debut for Zenit against Olympique Lyonnais. With a goal against Benfica in the following match, he surpassed Mehdi Mahdavikia and Ali Daei to become the most prolific Iranian goal scorer in the UEFA Champions League with four goals.

On 5 July 2020, he scored twice in a 4–2 victory over FC Krasnodar that secured a second consecutive Russian Premier League title for Zenit. On 22 July 2020, the last day of the 2019–20 Russian Premier League season, he scored his 17th goal in the league to finish as co-top scorer of the league with his teammate Artem Dzyuba.

On 2 May 2021, he scored a hat-trick to bring his league season scoring total to 19, as Zenit secured their third title in a row in a 6–1 victory over second-place Lokomotiv Moscow. He was overtaken as the league top scorer by his teammate Artem Dzyuba in the last game of the season on 16 May 2021 when Dzyuba scored four to bring his total to 20. He was voted RPL Player of the Season for the 2020–21 Russian Premier League season.

=== Bayer Leverkusen ===
On 22 January 2022, Bundesliga club Bayer Leverkusen announced that Azmoun had signed a pre-contract to join the club on a free transfer on 1 July 2022. He signed a five-year contract with Die Werkself. On 30 January, Zenit announced that the clubs have agreed on a winter transfer and Azmoun would move to Bayer Leverkusen immediately.

==== Loan to Roma ====
On 26 August 2023, Azmoun joined Serie A side Roma on loan for the 2023–24 season under manager José Mourinho. Roma also agreed an option to sign him permanently from Bayer Leverkusen. Azmoun is Roma's third Asian player in club history, and is the first Iranian to play for the club. Azmoun was not included in Roma's UEFA Europa League group stage squad due to UEFA Financial Fair Play Regulations. He scored his first goal for Roma on 5 November 2023 against Lecce. In February 2024, Azmoun was included in Daniele De Rossi's UEFA Europa League knockout stage squad. In May 2024, it was reported that Roma would not be activating the buy option for Azmoun.

=== Shabab Al Ahli ===
In July 2024, Azmoun moved to Shabab Al Ahli of the UAE Pro League, having agreed a three-year contract. The transfer fee paid to Bayer Leverkusen was reported as €5 million plus €1 million in potential bonuses.

== International career ==
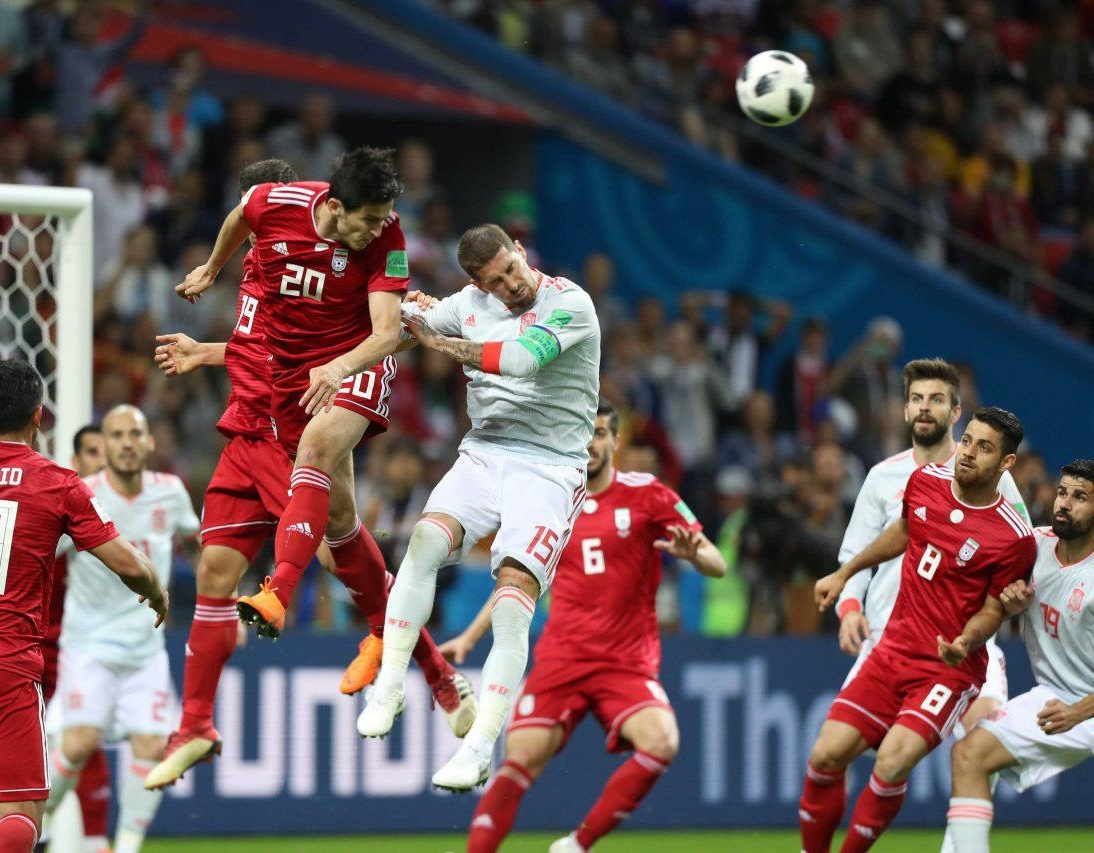
Azmoun playing for Iran against Sergio Ramos of Spain, 2018 FIFA World Cup

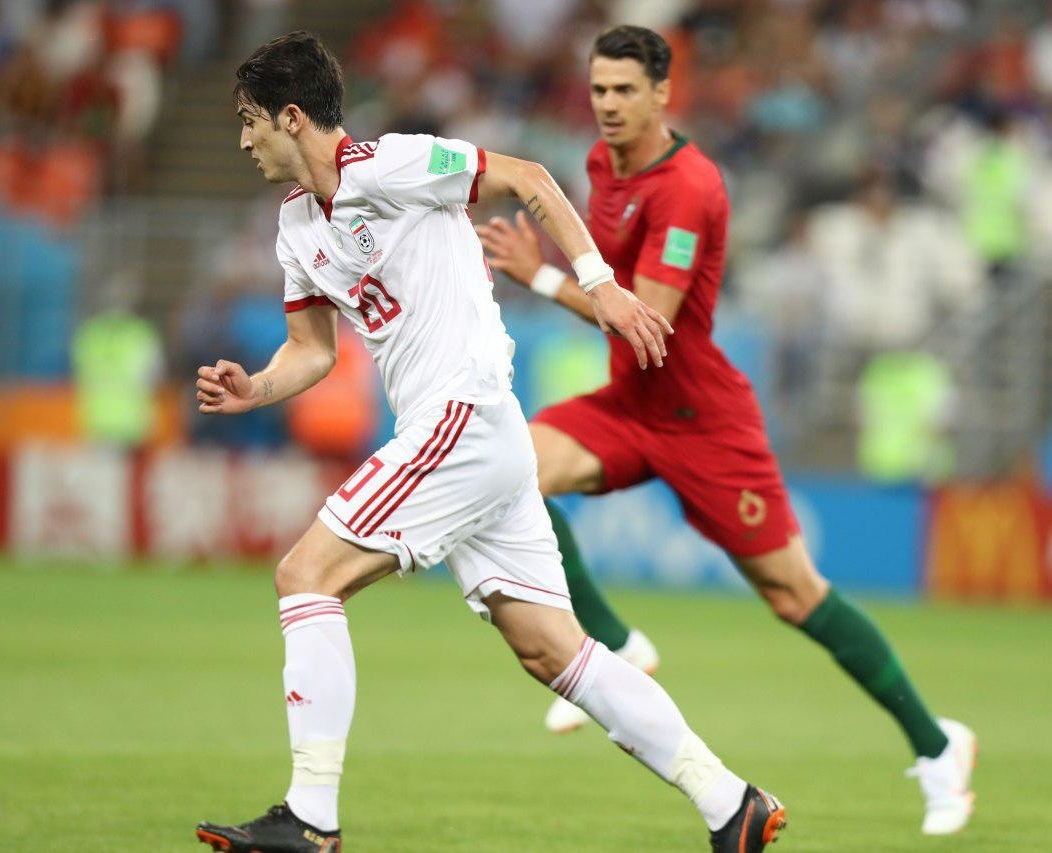
Azmoun playing for Iran against Portugal, 2018 FIFA World Cup

=== Youth ===
Azmoun broke out while representing the Iran U-20 side when he was first called up for the 2012 AFF U-19 Youth Championship, becoming the top scorer of the tournament before repeating the feat in the 2012 Commonwealth of Independent States Cup, scoring seven goals in six games. On 8 October 2013, he played for the U-20 team during the 2014 AFC U-19 Championship qualification in Kerman. In a match against Lebanon, he captained the team by scoring two goals, assisting one and drawing a penalty.

Azmoun was called into the U-23's team for Olympic qualifiers in March 2015. He was the tournament's leading goalscorer going into the final matchday with 4 goals in 3 matches. As the 2016 AFC U-23 Championship was not held during the FIFA International Match Calendar, he was not released by Rostov.

=== Senior ===
On 5 October 2013, Azmoun was called up to the Iranian national football team against Thailand by Carlos Queiroz. He was selected in Iran's 28-man provisional squad for the 2014 FIFA World Cup by Queiroz but was one of five players being dropped from the final squad.

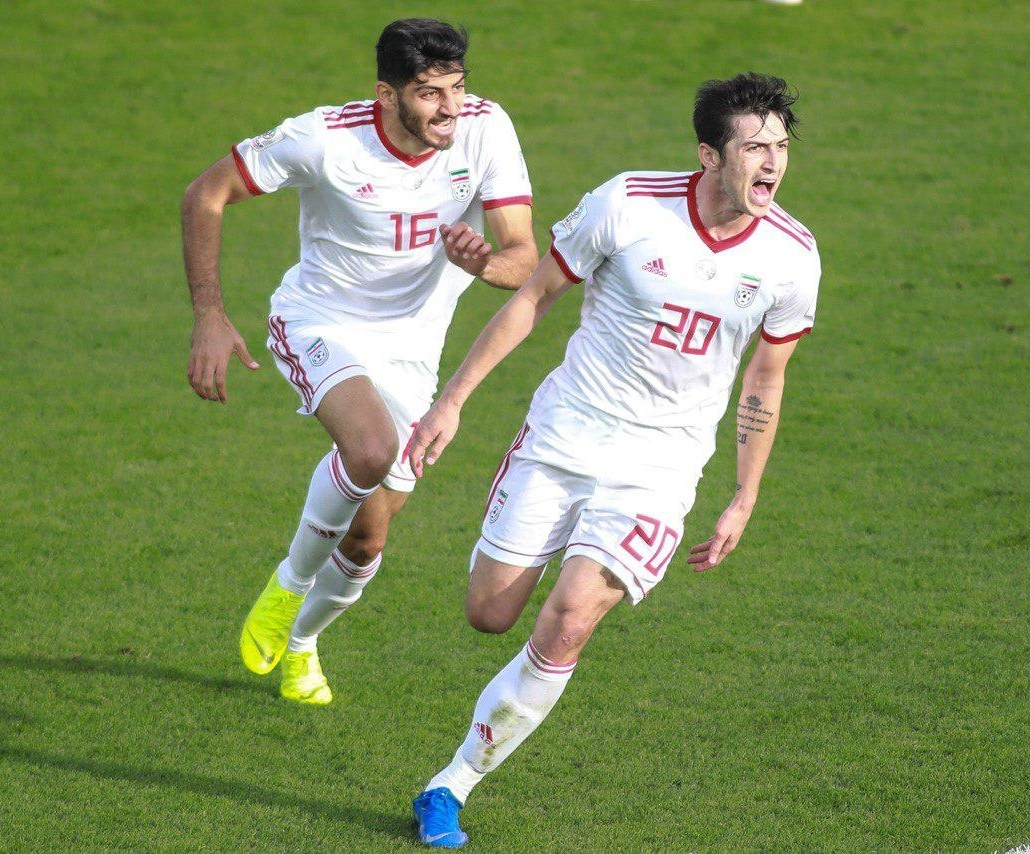
Azmoun celebrating his goal against Vietnam in the 2019 AFC Asian Cup

Azmoun made his senior debut on 26 May 2014 in a friendly match against Montenegro, coming on as a substitute in the 60th minute for Reza Ghoochannejhad. However, he was not included in Iran's squad for the 2014 FIFA World Cup, announced on 1 June 2014. He scored his first goal on 18 November 2014 in a 1–0 friendly win over South Korea. Azmoun was called into Iran's 2015 AFC Asian Cup squad on 30 December 2014 by Carlos Queiroz. He scored a goal in the next match, a 1–0 friendly win over rivals Iraq. He then scored the winner in the second game of the Asian Cup with a great piece of individual skill against Qatar. He also opened the scoring against Iraq in the quarter-finals with a header.

On 16 June 2015, Azmoun scored a goal against Turkmenistan in a 2018 FIFA World Cup qualifier. On 3 September 2015, he scored his first senior brace in a 6–0 defeat of Guam in the World Cup qualifiers. He scored his first hat-trick for Iranian national team in 3–0 win over Macedonia at Philip II Arena on 2 June 2016. Eight days later, he scored the first goal in Iran's 2–0 win over Uzbekistan which secured qualification to the 2018 FIFA World Cup. In June 2018 he was named in Iran's final squad for the 2018 World Cup in Russia. He made his first World Cup appearance in a 1–0 victory over Morocco in their first group stage match on 15 June.

Azmoun retired from International football at the age of 23 just after Iran's 2018 World Cup exit due to insults he received from fans, which, he said, had caused his mother's illness to worsen. Azmoun chose to retire to be by his mother's side. In October 2018, Azmoun returned to the Iranian national team and was called up for 2019 AFC Asian Cup by Carlos Queiroz.

During the 2022 Mahsa Amini protests, Azmoun took a public stance against the Iranian government. He indicated his public views could cost him the ability to play in the World Cup, but he said "That is worth sacrificing for one strand of Iranian women's hair". He was nevertheless allowed to play in a friendly against Senegal, at which he scored an equalizing goal which he declined to celebrate.

On 18 March 2026, Azmoun was permanently expelled from the national team for publishing several photos of himself with ruler of Dubai and Prime Minister and Vice President of the United Arab Emirates Mohammed bin Rashid Al Maktoum, and the ruler of Abu Dhabi and President of the United Arab Emirates, Mohammed bin Zayed Al Nahyan, in the midst of the 2026 Iran war. The Iranian regime cased that these photos show his disloyalty to Iran. He was eventually excluded from Iran's squad for the 2026 FIFA World Cup.

== Style of play ==
Azmoun has been praised for his aerial ability, creativity, and bursts of acceleration. He has been referred to as a young Zlatan Ibrahimović and has also been called the Iranian Messi by mainly British media.

Azmoun has also been touted to be the heir of legendary Iranian striker Ali Daei.

== Personal life ==
Azmoun was born into a Sunni family of Turkmen origin. He speaks Persian, Turkmen, Turkish, English and Russian fluently, and is fond of riding on horseback. He communicated with Kurban Berdyev, his Turkmenistani coach at FC Rubin Kazan and FC Rostov, in Turkmen. He decided to wear number 69 at Kazan as a tribute to his hometown's vehicle registration plate. Azmoun has stated he is a supporter of Spanish club Real Madrid. Azmoun has also stated that playing for Fenerbahçe is his childhood dream.

He is the son of Khalil Azmoun, a former Iranian national volleyball team player who has coached several volleyball teams, such as Golgohar Sirjan and Javaheri Gonbad VC.

Azmoun decided to retire from International football at the age of 23 just after Iran's 2018 World Cup exit due to heavy criticism he faced from fans, as the criticism caused his mother's illness to worsen. As a result, Azmoun chose to retire to be by his mother's side, but later returned to the team.

Azmoun is a member of the Humanitarian Association of World Turkmens.

=== Sporting interests ===
Outside of his footballing life, Azmoun is a keen equestrian, and is active in thoroughbred horse racing and breeding. He owns the Serik Horse Complex, a major horse racing and breeding complex based in his hometown of Gonbad-e Kavus. In a February 2022 interview Azmoun said that he owns 52 horses. In 2020, he bought the Australian thoroughbred horse Serlik for $500,000; Serlik is trained by Australian jockey Michelle Payne. In 2021, Azmoun bought a second Australian horse for $70,000, a Palentino colt also to be trained by Payne.

Azmoun is also the owner of Serik Gonbad Kavus Women's Volleyball Club in Iran. As of the 2022–23 season, the team will participate in Iran Women's Volleyball Premier League.

=== Activism ===
In September 2022 during the Mahsa Amini "Woman Life Freedom" protests, Azmoun posted a message of solidarity on Instagram,stating: “At worst I’ll be dismissed from the national team. No problem. I’d sacrifice that for one hair on the heads of Iranian women. This story will not be deleted. They can do whatever they want. Shame on you for killing so easily; long live Iranian women.” Also during the Mahsa Amini "Woman Life Freedom" Protests Azmoun supported fellow footballer Amir Reza Nasr Azadani, who was jailed as a result of the protests, by posting a picture of the latter with calls for the authorities to not execute Azadani.

Due to his online activism, in 2022, Azmoun's spot on the World Cup squad was a point of major friction. Despite reports that Iranian authorities pressured Iran's manager Carlos Queiroz to drop him for supporting the Mahsa Amini protests, Queiroz reportedly threatened to resign to ensure Azmoun's inclusion.

In 2025, Azmoun got a tattoo of the line "From the blood of the homeland's youth, tulips have bloomed" ( Persian: از خون جوانان وطن لاله دمیده) (Romanized: Az khoon-e javanan-e vatan laleh damideh) This verse is taken from a famous ballad composed by Aref Qazvini during the Iranian Constitutional Revolution (1905–1911). The poem was written as a tribute to those who sacrificed their lives in the struggle to overthrow the absolute monarchy of the Qajar Shah and establish a constitutional government. Over time, the line has evolved into an enduring symbol of political resistance and national protest in Iran.

On 7 January 2026, Azmoun publicly supported the 2025–2026 Iranian protests on his Instagram, stating: "As an athlete, I always stand by the people of the country. I wish my people well." He had previously stated that "We, the patient and beloved people of my country, do not have the right to be so far removed from our dreams."

During the 2026 Iran war, Azmoun who is a player for the UAE's Shahbab Al-Ahli, posted a picture of himself meeting with Dubai's ruler, Mohammed bin Rashid Al Maktoum. Azmoun later removed the pictures but was still reprimanded on state TV on Thursday with Iranian football pundit Mohammad Misaghi saying that Azmoun's actions had been an act of disloyalty. Azmoun was expelled from the national team squad, and there were reports that an order was given for Azmoun's assets in Iran to be seized.

== Career statistics ==
=== Club ===
As of match played 30 September 2025

Appearances and goals by club, season and competition
Club	Season	League			National cup (Note: Includes Russian Cup, DFB Pokal, Coppa Italia, UAE President's Cup)		League cup (Note: Includes UAE League Cup)		Continental		Other		Total	
Club	Season	Division	Apps	Goals	Apps	Goals	Apps	Goals	Apps	Goals	Apps	Goals	Apps	Goals
Rubin Kazan	2013–14	Russian Premier League	14	4	1	0	—		2 (Note: Appearances in UEFA Europa League)	1	—		17	5
Rubin Kazan	2014–15	Russian Premier League	13	1	2	1	—		—		—		15	2
Rubin Kazan	Total		27	5	3	1	0	0	2	1	0	0	32	7
Rostov (loan)	2014–15	Russian Premier League	11	3	0	0	—		—		1 (Note: Appearance in Russian Super Cup)	1	12	4
Rostov (loan)	2015–16	Russian Premier League	24	9	0	0	—		—		—		24	9
Rostov (loan)	Total		35	12	0	0	0	0	0	0	1	1	36	13
Rostov	2016–17	Russian Premier League	27	7	0	0	—		14 (Note: Ten appearances and four goals in UEFA Champions League, four appearances and one goal in UEFA Europa League)	5	—		41	12
Rubin Kazan	2017–18	Russian Premier League	26	5	2	0	—		—		—		28	5
Rubin Kazan	2018–19	Russian Premier League	14	4	3	1	—		—		—		17	5
Rubin Kazan	Total		40	9	5	1	0	0	0	0	0	0	96	22
Zenit Saint Petersburg	2018–19	Russian Premier League	12	9	0	0	—		4	3	—		16	12
Zenit Saint Petersburg	2019–20	Russian Premier League	28	17	3	0	—		6 (Note: Appearances in UEFA Champions League)	2	1	2	38	21
Zenit Saint Petersburg	2020–21	Russian Premier League	24	19	0	0	—		4	0	1	0	29	19
Zenit Saint Petersburg	2021–22	Russian Premier League	15	7	0	0	—		5	2	1	1	21	10
Zenit Saint Petersburg	Total		79	52	3	0	0	0	19	7	3	3	104	62
Bayer Leverkusen	2021–22	Bundesliga	9	1	0	0	—		2	0	—		11	1
Bayer Leverkusen	2022–23	Bundesliga	23	4	1	0	—		9 (Note: Two appearances in UEFA Champions League, seven appearances in UEFA Europa League)	0	—		33	4
Bayer Leverkusen	Total		32	5	1	0	0	0	11	0	0	0	44	5
Roma (loan)	2023–24	Serie A	23	3	2	0	—		4	0	—		29	3
Shabab Al Ahli	2024–25	UAE Pro League	21	11	3	1	3	4	11 (Note: Two appearances and one goal in AFC Champions League Elite, nine appearances and nine goals in AFC Champions League Two)	10	2 (Note: One appearance in UAE Super Cup, one appearance and one goal in Qatar–UAE Challenge Shield)	1	40	27
Shabab Al Ahli	2025–26	UAE Pro League	6	2	0	0	0	0	2	2	1	0	9	4
Shabab Al Ahli	Total		27	13	3	1	3	4	13	11	3	1	49	31
Career total			290	106	17	3	3	4	63	25	7	5	380	143

=== International ===
As of match played 17 November 2026

Appearances and goals by national team and year
National team	Year	Apps	Goals
Iran
Iran	2014	3	1
Iran	2015	11	7
Iran	2016	8	8
Iran	2017	8	6
Iran	2018	10	2
Iran	2019	10	8
Iran	2020	1	1
Iran	2021	9	6
Iran	2022	8	2
Iran	2023	7	8
Iran	2024	14	7
Iran	2025	2	1
Iran	2026	4	1
Total		95	58

As of match played 17 November 2026.
Scores and results list Iran's goal tally first, score column indicates score after each Azmoun goal.

List of international goals scored by Sardar Azmoun
No.	Date	Venue	Opponent	Score	Result	Competition
1	18 November 2014	Azadi Stadium, Tehran, Iran	South Korea	1–0	1–0	Friendly
2	4 January 2015	WIN Stadium, Wollongong, Australia	Iraq	1–0	1–0	Friendly
3	15 January 2015	Stadium Australia, Sydney, Australia	Qatar	1–0	1–0	2015 AFC Asian Cup
4	23 January 2015	Canberra Stadium, Bruce, Australia	Iraq	1–0	3–3 (6–7 p)	2015 AFC Asian Cup
5	16 June 2015	Sport Toplumy Stadium, Daşoguz, Turkmenistan	Turkmenistan	1–0	1–1	2018 FIFA World Cup qualification
6	3 September 2015	Azadi Stadium, Tehran, Iran	Guam	3–0	6–0	2018 FIFA World Cup qualification
7	3 September 2015	Azadi Stadium, Tehran, Iran	Guam	4–0	6–0	2018 FIFA World Cup qualification
8	8 September 2015	Sree Kanteerava Stadium, Bangalore, India	India	1–0	3–0	2018 FIFA World Cup qualification
9	24 March 2016	Azadi Stadium, Tehran, Iran	India	2–0	4–0	2018 FIFA World Cup qualification
10	29 March 2016	Azadi Stadium, Tehran, Iran	Oman	1–0	2–0	2018 FIFA World Cup qualification
11	29 March 2016	Azadi Stadium, Tehran, Iran	Oman	2–0	2–0	2018 FIFA World Cup qualification
12	2 June 2016	Philip II Arena, Skopje, Macedonia	Macedonia	1–0	3–1	Friendly
13	2 June 2016	Philip II Arena, Skopje, Macedonia	Macedonia	2–1	3–1	Friendly
14	2 June 2016	Philip II Arena, Skopje, Macedonia	Macedonia	3–1	3–1	Friendly
15	7 June 2016	Azadi Stadium, Tehran, Iran	Kyrgyzstan	5–0	6–0	Friendly
16	11 October 2016	Azadi Stadium, Tehran, Iran	South Korea	1–0	1–0	2018 FIFA World Cup qualification
17	4 June 2017	Podgorica City Stadium, Podgorica, Montenegro	Montenegro	1–0	2–1	Friendly
18	4 June 2017	Podgorica City Stadium, Podgorica, Montenegro	Montenegro	2–1	2–1	Friendly
19	12 June 2017	Azadi Stadium, Tehran, Iran	Uzbekistan	1–0	2–0	2018 FIFA World Cup qualification
20	5 September 2017	Azadi Stadium, Tehran, Iran	Syria	1–1	2–2	2018 FIFA World Cup qualification
21	5 September 2017	Azadi Stadium, Tehran, Iran	Syria	2–1	2–2	2018 FIFA World Cup qualification
22	10 October 2017	Kazan Arena, Kazan, Russia	Russia	1–0	1–1	Friendly
23	27 March 2018	UCP Arena, Graz, Austria	Algeria	1–0	2–1	Friendly
24	31 December 2018	Khalifa International Stadium, Doha, Qatar	Qatar	2–1	2–1	Friendly
25	7 January 2019	Mohammed bin Zayed Stadium, Abu Dhabi, United Arab Emirates	Yemen	4–0	5–0	2019 AFC Asian Cup
26	12 January 2019	Al Nahyan Stadium, Abu Dhabi, United Arab Emirates	Vietnam	1–0	2–0	2019 AFC Asian Cup
27	12 January 2019	Al Nahyan Stadium, Abu Dhabi, United Arab Emirates	Vietnam	2–0	2–0	2019 AFC Asian Cup
28	24 January 2019	Mohammed bin Zayed Stadium, Abu Dhabi, United Arab Emirates	China	2–0	3–0	2019 AFC Asian Cup
29	10 September 2019	Hong Kong Stadium, Hong Kong	Hong Kong	1–0	2–0	2022 FIFA World Cup qualification
30	10 October 2019	Azadi Stadium, Tehran, Iran	Cambodia	2–0	14–0	2022 FIFA World Cup qualification
31	10 October 2019	Azadi Stadium, Tehran, Iran	Cambodia	5–0	14–0	2022 FIFA World Cup qualification
32	10 October 2019	Azadi Stadium, Tehran, Iran	Cambodia	7–0	14–0	2022 FIFA World Cup qualification
33	8 October 2020	Pakhtakor Central Stadium, Tashkent, Uzbekistan	Uzbekistan	1–0	2–1	Friendly
34	30 March 2021	Azadi Stadium, Tehran, Iran	Syria	2–0	3–0	Friendly
35	7 June 2021	Bahrain National Stadium, Riffa, Bahrain	Bahrain	1–0	3–0	2022 FIFA World Cup qualification
36	7 June 2021	Bahrain National Stadium, Riffa, Bahrain	Bahrain	2–0	3–0	2022 FIFA World Cup qualification
37	15 June 2021	Al Muharraq Stadium, Arad, Bahrain	Iraq	1–0	1–0	2022 FIFA World Cup qualification
38	11 November 2021	Saida Municipal Stadium, Sidon, Lebanon	Lebanon	1–1	2–1	2022 FIFA World Cup qualification
39	16 November 2021	King Abdullah II Stadium, Amman, Jordan	Syria	1–0	3–0	2022 FIFA World Cup qualification
40	29 March 2022	Imam Reza Stadium, Mashhad, Iran	Lebanon	1–0	2–0	2022 FIFA World Cup qualification
41	27 September 2022	Motion invest Arena, Maria Enzersdorf, Austria	Senegal	1–1	1–1	Friendly
42	13 June 2023	Dolen Omurzakov Stadium, Bishkek, Kyrgyzstan	Afghanistan	1–0	6–1	2023 CAFA Nations Cup
43	16 June 2023	Dolen Omurzakov Stadium, Bishkek, Kyrgyzstan	Kyrgyzstan	4–1	5–1	2023 CAFA Nations Cup
44	16 June 2023	Dolen Omurzakov Stadium, Bishkek, Kyrgyzstan	Kyrgyzstan	5–1	5–1	2023 CAFA Nations Cup
45	20 June 2023	Milliy Stadium, Tashkent, Uzbekistan	Uzbekistan	1–0	1–0	2023 CAFA Nations Cup
46	13 October 2023	Amman International Stadium, Amman, Jordan	Jordan	1–0	3–1	2023 Jordan International Tournament
47	17 October 2023	Amman International Stadium, Amman, Jordan	Qatar	3–0	4–0	2023 Jordan International Tournament
48	16 November 2023	Azadi Stadium, Tehran, Iran	Hong Kong	1–0	4–0	2026 FIFA World Cup qualification
49	16 November 2023	Azadi Stadium, Tehran, Iran	Hong Kong	2–0	4–0	2026 FIFA World Cup qualification
50	14 January 2024	Education City Stadium, Al Rayyan, Qatar	Palestine	4–1	4–1	2023 AFC Asian Cup
51	7 February 2024	Al Thumama Stadium, Doha, Qatar	Qatar	1–0	2–3	2023 AFC Asian Cup
52	21 March 2024	Azadi Stadium, Tehran, Iran	Turkmenistan	2–0	5–0	2026 FIFA World Cup qualification
53	6 June 2024	Hong Kong Stadium, Hong Kong	Hong Kong	4–2	4–2	2026 FIFA World Cup qualification
54	15 October 2024	Rashid Stadium, Dubai, United Arab Emirates	Qatar	1–1	4–1	2026 FIFA World Cup qualification
55	15 October 2024	Rashid Stadium, Dubai, United Arab Emirates	Qatar	2–1	4–1	2026 FIFA World Cup qualification
56	19 November 2024	Dolen Omurzakov Stadium, Bishkek, Kyrgyzstan	Kyrgyzstan	3–2	3–2	2026 FIFA World Cup qualification
57	20 March 2025	Azadi Stadium, Tehran, Iran	United Arab Emirates	1–0	2–0	2026 FIFA World Cup qualification
58	14 November 2026	Basra International Stadium, Basra, Iraq	Palestine	1–0	2–0	2026 Basra International Tournament

== Honours ==
Zenit Saint Petersburg

- Russian Premier League: 2018–19, 2019–20, 2020–21, 2021–22
- Russian Cup: 2019–20
- Russian Super Cup: 2020, 2021

Shabab Al Ahli

- UAE Pro League: 2024–25
- UAE President's Cup: 2024–25
- UAE Super Cup: 2024
- Qatar–UAE Challenge Shield: 2025

Iran U17

- WAFF U-15 Championship: 2009

Iran U20

- AFF U-19 Youth Championship: 2012

Iran

- CAFA Nations Cup: 2023

Individual

- UAE Golden Ball: 2025
- Toopa Top Goal Scorer Awards: 2025
- AFF U-19 Youth Championship top goalscorer: 2012
- Commonwealth of Independent States Cup top goalscorer: 2012
- AFC Asian Cup Team of the Tournament: 2019, 2023
- Russian Football Union First-class Player: 2019–20, 2020–21
- Russian Premier League Player of the Season: 2020–21
- Russian Premier League Player of the Month: March 2019
- Russian Premier League top goalscorer: 2019–20
- IFFHS Asian Men's Team of the Year: 2020, 2021
- AFC Champions League Two top goalscorer: 2024–25

== See also ==
- List of men's footballers with 50 or more international goals
