= Presidential Court =

Government ministry in the United Arab Emirates

- وزارة شؤون الرئاسة (Arabic)
- Logo of the Presidential Court

Ministry overview
- Formed: 1971 (as Diwan); reorganized in 2004
- Jurisdiction: Federal government of the United Arab Emirates
- Headquarters: Abu Dhabi, United Arab Emirates
- Minister responsible: Mansour bin Zayed Al Nahyan, Vice President, Deputy Prime Minister, and Minister of the Presidential Court
- Website: diwan.gov.ae

The Presidential Court (Arabic: وزارة شؤون الرئاسة), formerly known as the Ministry of Presidential Affairs, is a government ministry in the United Arab Emirates (UAE), tasked with providing administrative, advisory, and executive support to the President of the UAE. It plays a role in implementing presidential directives, coordinating national policies, and overseeing state-level engagements. The court is headquartered in Abu Dhabi, the UAE capital.

== History ==
The Presidential Court dates back to the formation of the United Arab Emirates in 1971, when it was initially known as the Diwan (Presidential Court). This entity served as the official Office of the President, providing administrative support and facilitating communication between the President and various governmental bodies.

On 1 November 2004, under Federal Decree-Law No. 4 of 2004, the Diwan was restructured to form the Ministry of Presidential Affairs. This reorganization aimed to enhance the administrative and executive functions supporting the presidency. Sheikh Mansour bin Zayed Al Nahyan was appointed as the first Minister of Presidential Affairs, a position he has held since its inception.

In July 2022, Sheikh Mohamed bin Zayed Al Nahyan, the president of the UAE, issued a Federal Decree-Law renaming the Ministry of Presidential Affairs as the Presidential Court. This change was part of a broader effort to streamline governmental functions and reflect the evolving role of the institution in supporting the President's duties. The title of "Minister of Presidential Affairs" was accordingly updated to "Minister of the Presidential Court," with Sheikh Mansour bin Zayed Al Nahyan continuing in this role.

== Leadership ==
The Presidential Court is currently led by Sheikh Mansour bin Zayed Al Nahyan, who serves as the country's Vice President, Deputy Prime Minister, and Minister of the Presidential Court.

== See also ==
- Federal Supreme Council, the highest constitutional authority in the UAE;
- Sheikh Mohamed bin Zayed Al Nahyan, the current president of the UAE;
- Sheikh Mansour bin Zayed Al Nahyan, the Chairman of the Presidential Court.
