= Managerial Dilemmas =

Managerial Dilemmas: The Political Economy of Hierarchy is a 1992 book by Gary J. Miller, at the time Professor of Political Economy at Washington University in St. Louis. Miller argues that corporate culture must inspire loyalty in workers to go beyond direct incentives.

== Reception ==
A review by John Landry in the Journal of Economic History stated "His analysis strengthens the position of scholars who see corporate culture influencing how firms overcome agency problems. A satisfying theory of cooperation, however, must now go on to show how we can distinguish policies that encourage cooperation from those that result from old-fashioned opportunism. Where does a firm draw the line between taking care of employees to win their commitment to its goals and burdening itself with costly programs that reduce flexibility?"

A review by Nicole W. Biggart in the American Journal of Sociology stated Miller "is very much wedded to an economics paradigm, although he embraces the institutional perspective of Ronald Coase and Douglass North".
