= Make it in the Emirates =

United Arab Emirates government initiative

- اصنع في الإمارات
- Founder: Mohamed bin Zayed Al Nahyan; Mohammed bin Rashid Al Maktoum
- Country: United Arab Emirates
- Ministry: Ministry of Industry and Advanced Technology
- Key people: Sultan Ahmed al-Jaber; Ministry of Industry and Advanced Technology (United Arab Emirates)
- Launched: 22 March 2021; 5 years ago Qasr Al Watan
- Status: Active
- Website: Make it in the Emirates

Make it in the Emirates (MIITE; Arabic: اصنع في الإمارات) is an initiative by the Government of the United Arab Emirates to make and encourage companies to develop and manufacture products in the United Arab Emirates. The manufacturing strategy is considered as an extension of the 'Brand UAE' and was first unveiled in March 2021 by the country's then Abu Dhabi Crown Prince Sheikh Mohammed bin Zayed al-Nahyan and Dubai ruler Sheikh Mohammed bin Rashid al-Maktoum. It is part of the 'Operation 300Bn' strategy that is altogether regulated and enforced by the nation's Ministry of Industry and Advanced Technology.

The strategy was unveiled at Qasr al-Watan in Abu Dhabi on March 22, 2021, following the launch of 'Operation 300bn' in the presence of the-then Crown Prince of Abu Dhabi Sheikh Mohammed bin Zayed al-Nahyan and Dubai ruler Sheikh Mohammed bin Rashid al-Maktoum besides the Minister of Interior Sheikh Saif bin Zayed al-Nahyan, Minister of Presidential Affairs Sheikh Mansour bin Zayed and the Minister of Foreign Affairs Sheikh Abdullah bin Zayed al-Nahyan.

The initiative was devised by the government following the adverse impact on the economy of the United Arab Emirates after the outbreak of the COVID-19 pandemic in the country and the realization of the importance of domestic production and manufacturing. The initiative is expected to contribute significantly in the 'Operation 300bn', a ten-year strategy on increasing the industrial sector's contribution to the country's GDP from 133 billion dirhams to 300 billion dirhams by 2031.

An annual event is held in Abu Dhabi, where companies from different sectors from across the country come and participate and showcase their products, the event is usually held in May, the 2026 event is from 4th of May till 7th of May.

In 2024, more than 1300 products obtained the (Made in the Emirates) mark.

== Objectives ==
- Promote local production.
- Promote Emirati products, locally & internationally.
- Attract industrialists, investors, innovators and entrepreneurs.
- Increase non-oil exports.
