= Emirates Authority for Standardization and Metrology =

Federal standards body of the United Arab Emirates (2001 – 2020)

Agency overview
- Formed: 2001
- Dissolved: 2020
- Superseding agency: Ministry of Industry and Advanced Technology
- Jurisdiction: Government of the United Arab Emirates
- Headquarters: Dubai, United Arab Emirates
- Website: www.esma.ae

Emirates Authority for Standardization and Metrology (ESMA) was the national standards regulatory body of the United Arab Emirates. Established in 2001 by the Federal Law No. 28, the agency was tasked with exercising responsibilities by unifying the country's management, supervision and coordination of standards, regulations, and quality control through providing standards, metrology, conformity assessment and accreditation services in accordance with international requirements and practices. It was merged with the newly created Ministry of Industry and Advanced Technology following the cabinet-shakeup of July 2020 in the aftermath the outbreak of the COVID-19 pandemic.
