= Ministry of Investment =

Ministry of Investment may refer to:

- Ministry of Investment (Indonesia)
- Ministry of Investment (Saudi Arabia)
- Ministry of Investment (United Arab Emirates)
