= Emirates Investment Authority =

Sovereign wealth fund of the federal government of the United Arab Emirates

- Native name: جهاز الإمارات للاستثمار
- Type: State-owned
- Industry: Sovereign wealth fund
- Founded: 2007; 19 years ago
- Headquarters: Abu Dhabi, United Arab Emirates
- Key people: Mansour Bin Zayed Al Nahyan (Chairman); Mohamed Hamad Al Mehairi (CEO)
- AUM: US$ 116 billion
- Owner: Federal government of the United Arab Emirates
- Website: https://www.eia.gov.ae/

The Emirates Investment Authority (EIA; Arabic: جهاز الإمارات للاستثمار) is the only sovereign wealth fund of the federal government of the United Arab Emirates. It was established in 2007, and the EIA has actively sought unique investment opportunities locally, regionally and internationally, focussing on investing in asset classes considered to help strengthen and diversify the UAE economy.

== Investments ==
The EIA made two investments when it acquired major holdings in two Middle Eastern and North African telecommunications companies, Etisalat and du. Further investments are known to have been made in Gulf International Bank in Bahrain, the United Arab Shipping Company, and the Gulf Investment Corporation. In total, the EIA has acquired over 30 stakes in corporations across the GCC.

== Board Members ==
The board of directors consists of:

- Sheikh Mansour bin Zayed Al Nahyan, Deputy Prime Minister and Minister of Presidential Affairs
- Mohamed Hadi Al Hussaini – Deputy Chairman and Minister of State for Financial Affairs
- Abdulla bin Touq Al Mari – Member and Minister of Economy
- Sultan Ahmed Al Jaber – Member and Minister of Industry and Advanced Technology
- Khaled Mohammed Balama – Member and Governor of the CBUAE
- Eissa Mohamed Al Suwaidi – Member, Minister of Investment and Chief Executive Director of the Abu Dhabi Developmental Holding Company
- Kaltham Hamad Balabad Al Ghefli – Investment Manager in the External Equities Department in Abu Dhabi Investment Authority
- Ahmed Jasim Al Zaabi – Member and Chairman at Abu Dhabi Global Market
- Hareb Masood Al Darmaki – Member
