= Saudi-Emirati Coordination Council =

Bilateral council between Saudi Arabia and the United Arab Emirates

- مجلس التنسيق السعودي الإماراتي
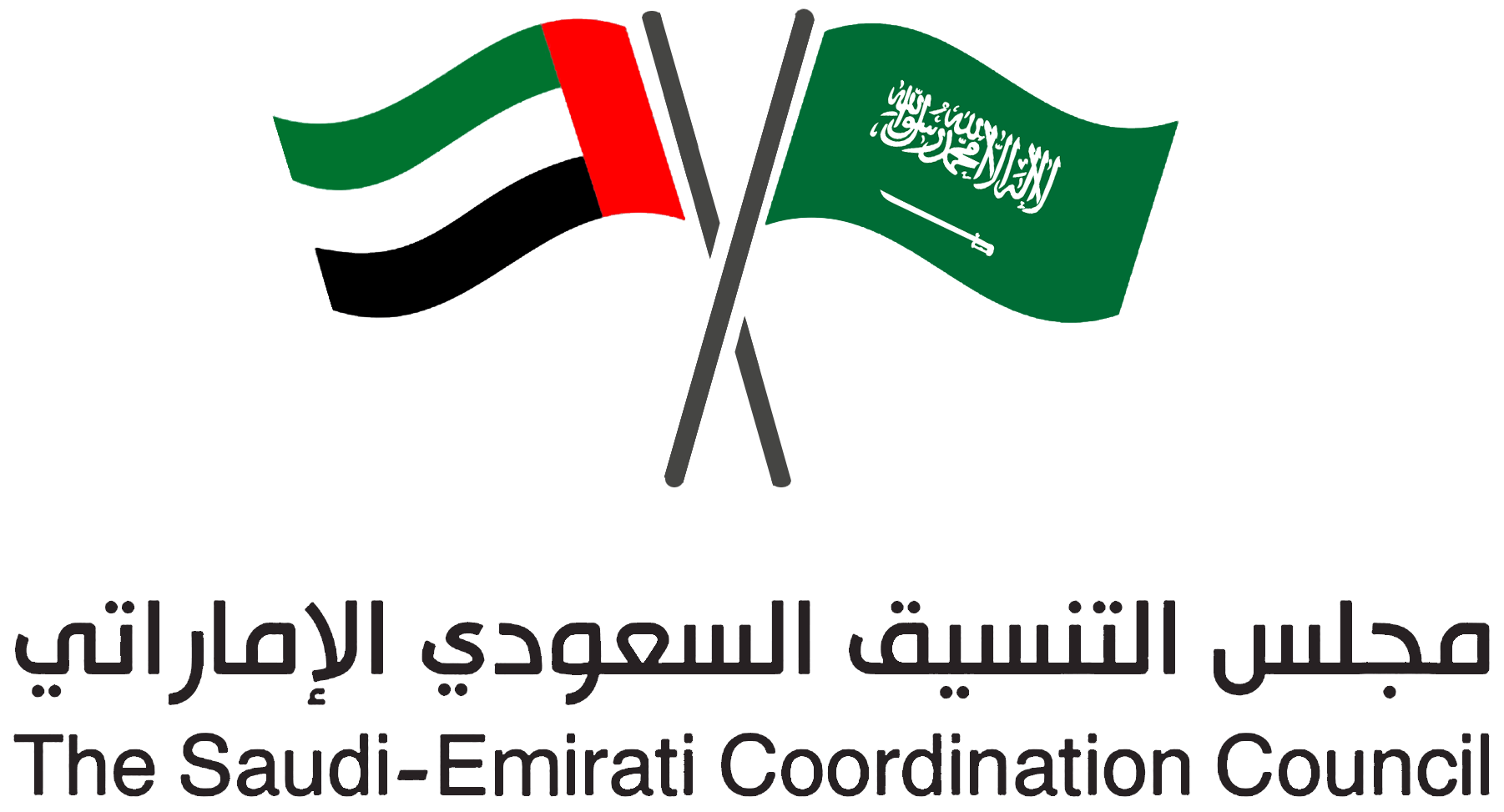

Agency overview
- Formed: 16 May 2016; 10 years ago
- Jurisdiction: Government of Saudi Arabia; Government of the United Arab Emirates
- Child agency: Saudi-Emirati Youth Council

Saudi-Emirati Coordination Council (SECC) (Arabic: مجلس التنسيق السعودي الإماراتي) is an interdepartmental bilateral council established between Saudi Arabia and the United Arab Emirates in 2016. The council seeks to ensure synergy between the two countries on achieving joint initiatives and cooperation in various areas, especially security, politics, investments and trade. It is the first council of its kind formed between the two states since the creation of the Gulf Cooperation Council (GCC) in 1981.

The council consists of a presidency, executive committee and several cabinet-level ministers representing key strategic government departments in both the countries.

== Overview ==
The council was set-up on May 16, 2016, during the state-visit of Abu Dhabi's then Crown Prince Mohamed bin Zayed al-Nahyan to Saudi Arabia. The signing ceremony occurred in the presence of Mohamed bin Zayed and King Salman bin Abdulaziz in Jeddah's al-Salam Palace. In February 2017, a high-level conclave was held and more than 150 officials and experts attended to discuss the areas of mutual interest as well as to set a general framework for the council. A second follow-up meeting was held in Riyadh in April 2017.

The council held its inaugural meeting on June 6, 2018, in Jeddah, Saudi Arabia and was chaired by Saudi Crown Prince Mohammed bin Salman and Abu Dhabi Crown Prince Mohamed bin Zayed. During the meeting, the council's organizational structure was unveiled, which consisted of a presidency, executive committee and several cabinet-level ministers representing key strategic departments in both the countries. Both leaders announced 44 joint projects by both the countries.

The council held its second meeting in Riyadh, Saudi Arabia in April 2019 where the executive committee announced the launch of seven joint committees in 26 areas of cooperation. Its follow-up meeting was also held in Riyadh in October 2019.
