= Federal Supreme Council =

Highest constitutional authority in the UAE

- Emblem of the United Arab Emirates

Type
- Type: Unicameral

History
- Founded: 2 December 1971
- Preceded by: Trucial States Council

Leadership
- President: Mohamed bin Zayed Al Nahyan since 14 May 2022
- Vice President: Mohammed bin Rashid Al Maktoum since 5 January 2006
- Mansour bin Zayed Al Nahyan since 29 March 2023
- Prime Minister of the United Arab Emirates: Mohammed bin Rashid Al Maktoum since 11 February 2006

Structure
- Seats: 7 (one for each emirate)
- Political groups: Emirate (7)

Elections
- Voting system: None

Meeting place
- Abu Dhabi, United Arab Emirates

Website
- Official website

The Federal Supreme Council (Arabic: المجلس الأعلى للاتحاد, lit. 'Supreme Council of the Union'), also known as the Supreme Council of Rulers, is the highest constitutional authority in the United Arab Emirates, being the highest legislative and executive body. It is made up of the de facto rulers of each of the nation's seven constituent polities: the Emirates of the United Arab Emirates. It replaced the earlier Trucial States Council upon the formation of the United Arab Emirates in 1971 and establishes general policies and sanctions federal legislation. It is the highest organ of national government in the hierarchy of five federal authorities prescribed in the Constitution: Federal Supreme Council; president and vice president; federal cabinet; Federal National Council; and federal judiciary.

== History ==
The Trucial States Council was established as an informal consultative body and held its first meeting on 23 March 1952 to bring the rulers closer together with the possibility of their forming some political or economic association in the future. It came into being following the British recognition of Fujairah as an independent emirate within the Trucial States. The council met twice a year under the chairmanship of the British representative in Dubai and held 30 such meetings between 1952 and 1968. In 1964, Adi Bitar was appointed as a legal adviser to the council. In 1965, the Trucial Coast Development Council was established. In 1966, the British political agency withdrew itself from presiding over the meetings and Sheikh Saqr al-Qasimi was elected as the president. He was soon replaced by Sheikh Zayed bin Sultan, the ruler of Abu Dhabi.

After the Union in 1971, the Trucial States Council consisted of the six rulers of the Emirates who signed the Constitution and was renamed as the Federal Supreme Council. It elected Sheikh Zayed bin Sultan Al Nahyan, emir of Abu Dhabi, as president and appointed a federal cabinet. On 23 December 1971, the Emirate of Ras al-Khaimah sent a letter to the Council requesting to join the union. The Council agreed to the request and the Ras al-Khaimah was admitted to the Union on 10 February 1972.

== Council meetings ==
The Federal Supreme Council meets four times each year and its meetings are often on an informal basis and attend meetings of the Board, consisting of the seven rulers of the emirates or those acting in their emirate in the case of their absence. Each has one vote in the council's resolutions.

== Council functions ==
The Supreme Council of the Union has the following functions:

1. The general policies in all matters entrusted to the Union by this Constitution consider what achieves the objectives of the Union and the common interests of the member Emirates.
2. The ratification of the various federal laws before they are issued, including the laws of the annual general budget of the Union and the final account.
3. The ratification of the decrees on the subject matters under the provisions of this Constitution for the ratification or approval of the Federal Supreme Council before the issuance of these decrees by the president.
4. Ratification of institutions and agreements are ratified by decree.
5. To approve the appointment of the prime minister and the cabinet and the acceptance of their resignation and removal from office upon the proposal of the president.
6. To approve the appointment of the president and Judges of the Federal Supreme Court and the acceptance of their resignations and dismissal in the circumstances prescribed in the Constitution. Are all decrees.
7. High control over the affairs of the Union in general.
8. Any other functions stipulated in this Constitution or federal laws.

== Current members ==
The Federal Supreme Council consists of the rulers of the seven emirates:

| Current member | | Since | Status | Title | Emirate |
| Portrait | Name | Since | Status | Title | Emirate |
|---|---|---|---|---|---|
| | Sheikh Mohamed bin Zayed Al Nahyan | 2022 | Ruler of Abu Dhabi | Chairman of the Federal Supreme Council (President) | Abu Dhabi |
| | Sheikh Mohammed bin Rashid Al Maktoum | 2006 | Ruler of Dubai | Deputy Chairman of the Federal Supreme Council (Vice President), Prime Minister | Dubai |
| | Sheikh Sultan bin Muhammad Al-Qasimi | 1972 | Ruler of Sharjah | Member of the Federal Supreme Council | Sharjah |
| | Sheikh Humaid bin Rashid Al Nuaimi | 1981 | Ruler of Ajman | Member of the Federal Supreme Council | Ajman |
| | Sheikh Hamad bin Mohammed Al Sharqi | 1974 | Ruler of Fujairah | Member of the Federal Supreme Council | Fujairah |
| | Sheikh Saud bin Rashid Al Mu'alla | 2009 | Ruler of Umm al-Quwain | Member of the Federal Supreme Council | Umm al-Quwain |
| | Sheikh Saud bin Saqr al Qasimi | 2010 | Ruler of Ras al-Khaimah | Member of the Federal Supreme Council | Ras al-Khaimah |
