= List of highest payments of Iranian football =

The following is a list of highest men's association football payments of Iran, which details the highest transfer fees paid for players from Iran or fees paid by Iranian clubs, as well as the largest contracts signed ever.

== Highest transfer payments for Iranian players in Europe ==
Player	From	To	Fee	Year	Ref
Alireza Jahanbakhsh	(Netherlands) Alkmaar	(England) Brighton & Hove Albion	£17m	2018	
Sardar Azmoun	(Russia) Rubin Kazan	(Russia) Zenit Saint Petersburg	€12m	2019	
Ashkan Dejagah	(England) Fulham	(Qatar) Al-Arabi	€6.3m	2014	
Kaveh Rezaei	(Belgium) Charleroi	(Belgium) Brugge	€5m	2018	
Sardar Azmoun	(Germany) Leverkusen	(United Arab Emirates) Shabab Al Ahli	€5m	2024	
Ali Karimi	(Germany) Bayern Munich	Qatar	€4–5m	2007	
Saman Ghoddos	(Sweden) Östersunds	(France) Amiens	€3.8m	2018	
Ali Daei	(Germany) Bayern Munich	(Germany) Hertha	DM5.3–7m	1999	
Ashkan Dejagah	(Germany) Wolfsburg	(England) Fulham	€2.5m	2012	
Ali Daei	(Germany) Arminia Bielefeld	(Germany) Bayern Munich	€2.25m	1998	
Vahid Hashemian	(Germany) Bochum	(Germany) Bayern Munich	€2m	2004	
Alireza Jahanbakhsh	(Netherlands) NEC	(Netherlands) Alkmaar	€2m	2015	
Vahid Hashemian	(Germany) Bayern Munich	(Germany) Hannover	€1.5m	2005	
Ehsan Hajsafi	(Greece) Panionios	(Greece) Olympiacos	€0.6m	2017	
Vahid Hashemian	(Germany) Hamburg	(Germany) Bochum	DM0.75m	2001	
Karim Ansarifard	(Greece) Panionios	(Greece) Olympiacos	€0.4m	2017	

== Highest transfer payments received by Iranian clubs ==
Player	From	To	Fee	Year	Ref
Mehdi Mahdavikia	Persepolis	(Germany) Hamburg	DM4.5m	2001	
Mehdi Mahdavikia	Persepolis	(Germany) Hamburg	DM2.5m	1999	
Karim Bagheri	Persepolis	(England) Charlton Athletic	£0.4m/$1.6m	2000	
Alireza Haghighi	Persepolis	(Russia) Rubin Kazan	€0.95m	2012	
Allahyar Sayyadmanesh	Esteghlal	(Turkey) Fenerbahçe	€0.85m	2019	
Alireza Beiranvand	Persepolis	(Belgium) Royal Antwerp	€0.63m	2020	
Majid Hosseini	Esteghlal	(Turkey) Trabzonspor	€0.4m	2018	
Ali Karimi	Sepahan	(Croatia) Dinamo Zagreb	$0.4m	2016	
Andranik Teymourian	Aboumoslem	(England) Bolton Wanderers	£0.255m	2006	
Younes Delfi	Esteghlal Khuzestan	(Belgium) Charleroi	€0.3m	2019	
Ali Gholizadeh	Saipa	(Belgium) Charleroi	€0.3m	2018	
Omid Noorafkan	Esteghlal	(Belgium) Charleroi	€0.25m	2018	
Rahman Rezaei	Zob Ahan	(Italy) Perugia	€0.15m	2001	
Rasoul Khatibi	Pas	(Germany) Hamburg	DM0.15m	1999	

== Highest transfer payments paid by Iranian clubs ==
Player	From	To	Fee	Year	Ref
Mohammad Reza Khalatbari	(United Arab Emirates) Ajman	Persepolis	$0.85m	2013	
Javad Nekounam	(Spain) Osasuna	Esteghlal	€0.7m	2012	
Ehsan Hajsafi	(Greece) Olympiacos	Tractorsazi	€0.5m	2018	

== Largest contracts signed involving Iranian players ==
This is a list of highest salaried Iranian football players, whether they were transferred, signed as free agent or extended their contracts. It does not include undisclosed contracts. This list also does not necessarily reflect actual money collected by the players, since some contracts are eventually terminated due to different reasons. The contract figures referenced below are presented at face value and do not reflect potential pre or post-tax treatments.

Player	Club	Length of contract	Contract value	Average per year	Ref
Mehdi Mahdavikia	(Germany) Hamburg	3 years (2004–2007)	€6.6–6.9m	€2.2–2.3m	
Ali Karimi	(Qatar) Al-Sailiya	2 years (2008–2010) (Note: Contract terminated before end date)	€4.7m	€2.35m	
Mehdi Mahdavikia	(Germany) Eintracht Frankfurt	3 years (2007–2010)	€4.5m	€1.5m	
Vahid Hashemian	(Germany) Bayern Munich	3 years (2004–2007)	€4.5m	€1.5m	
Ali Karimi	Al-Qatar	2 years (2007–2009)	£3.2m	£1.6m	
Mehdi Taremi	(Qatar) Al-Gharafa	1½ years (2018–2019)	$2.5m	$1.66m	
Mehrdad Minavand	(Austria) Sturm Graz	3 years (1998–2001)	$2.0m	$0.66m	
Farhad Majidi	(United Arab Emirates) Al-Nasr	2 years (2006–2008)	$2.0m	$1.0m	
Vahid Hashemian	(Germany) Bochum	3 years (2002–2005)	€1.8m	€0.6m	
Karim Ansarifard	(Greece) Olympiacos	3½ years (2017–2020)	€1.75m	€0.5m	
Arash Borhani	(United Arab Emirates) Al-Nasr	1 year (2006–2007)	$1.6m	—	
Mehdi Taremi	(Portugal) Rio Ave	2 years (2019–2021)	€1.4m	€0.7m	
Vahid Amiri	(Turkey) Trabzonspor	2 years (2018–2020)	€1.4m	€0.7m	
Ehsan Hajsafi	(Greece) Olympiacos	3½ years (2017–2021)	€1.4m	€0.4m	
Mehrzad Madanchi	(United Arab Emirates) Al-Nasr	1 year (2008–2009)	$1.5m	—	
Ali Karimi	(United Arab Emirates) Al-Ahli	2 years (2001–2003)	$1.3m	$0.65m	
Andranik Teymourian	(Qatar) Umm Salal	1 year (2015–2016)	$1.2m	—	
Mehrzad Madanchi	(United Arab Emirates) Al-Ahli	1 year (2009–2010)	€1.0m	—	
Javad Nekounam	(United Arab Emirates) Al-Wahda	½ year (2006)	$1.0m	—	
Ali Samereh	(United Arab Emirates) Ajman	1 year (2008–2009)	$1.0m	—	
Masoud Shojaei	(Qatar) Al-Gharafa	1 year (2015–2016)	$1.0m	—	
Ali Karimi	(Germany) Schalke	½ year (2011)	€0.72m	—	
Rahman Rezaei	(Qatar) Al-Ahli	1 year (2009–2010)	$0.7m	—	
Khodadad Azizi	(Germany) Köln	3 years (1997–2000)	DM1.6m	DM0.53m	
Hamed Kavianpour	(United Arab Emirates) Al-Wasl	1 year (2002–2003)	$0.5m	—	

=== Largest buyout clauses set for Iranian players ===
This is a list of largest reported buyout clauses set for Iranian players whether they were triggered or not:

Player	Club	Duration	Clause	Ref
Masoud Shojaei	(Spain) Osasuna	2008–2010	€6.0m	
Sardar Azmoun	(Russia) Rubin Kazan	2013–2016	€6.0m (Note: Clause activated by transfer)	
Javad Nekounam	(Spain) Osasuna	2006–2010	€5.0m	
Masoud Shojaei	(Spain) Osasuna	2010–2011	€3.0m	
Javad Nekounam	(Spain) Osasuna	2010–2012	€2.5m (Note: Released without clause activation)	
Vahid Hashemian	(Germany) Bochum	2002–2004	€2.0m	
Mohammad Reza Khalatbari	(United Arab Emirates) Ajman	2013	$0.85m	
Karim Ansarifard	(Greece) Panionios	2015–2017	€0.4m	
