= General Civil Aviation Authority =

Federal Civil aviation authority of the United Arab Emirates

United Arab Emirates General Civil Aviation Authority (GCAA)
- الهيئة العامة للطيران المدني

Agency overview
- Jurisdiction: UAE
- Agency executive: Abdulla bin Touq Al Marri, (Chairman); Saif Mohammed Al Suwaidi, (Director General)
- Website: www.gcaa.gov.ae

The General Civil Aviation Authority (GCAA, Arabic: الهيئة العامة للطيران المدني) is the federal civil aviation authority of the United Arab Emirates. Its headquarters is in Al Rawdah, Abu Dhabi.

The GCAA is the federal responsible authority for the control and regulation of civil aviation in the UAE.

== History ==
It was established in 1996 by Federal Cabinet Decree (Law 4) to regulate Civil Aviation and provide designated aviation services with emphasis on safety and security and to strengthen the aviation industry within the UAE and its upper airspace. In late 2009, the GCAA opened its new Air Navigation Centre, The Sheikh Zayed Centre, which is considered the largest and busiest air traffic management facility in the Middle East as well as one of the world's most technically advanced centres in terms of its design.

== Memberships ==
- The United Arab Emirates, represented by GCAA, is an active member of the Council of the International Civil Aviation Organization (ICAO) and its specialized committees.
- GCAA is also an active member of the Arab Civil Aviation Commission (ACAC) Executive Council, and currently H.E Saif Mohammed Al Suwaidi, Director General of GCAA is heading the ACAC Executive Council.

== Functions ==
1. Promulgate the general policy for civil aviation and propose laws and regulations which ensure the organization thereof, forming the necessary committees to implement such policies and representing the State in the negotiations on matters involving its functions, and proposing the conclusion of bilateral agreements in the area of civil aviation and aerial meteorology, in accordance with the provisions of the constitution.

2. Promulgate rules related to overflight of the territory of the State, landing and departing from its airports, and the conditions of carriage of passengers, cargo and mail according to the Law, and in coordination with local authorities.

3. Determine areas over which flying is prohibited, restricted or dangerous on coordination with the concerned authorities in the State.

4. Determine aerial navigation routes to be followed on entry, departure or overflight by those aircraft given permission to transit the territory of the State.

5. Determine the condition for the registration of aircraft in the State, the registering and issue of the airworthiness certificates, and the specifications of nationality and registration symbols, and notifying the International Civil Aviation Organization regarding aircraft to which these matters apply and if any changes that may occur thereto.

6. Determine requirements for the appointment of aircraft crew members and issue the necessary licenses and related documents as appropriate.

7. Determine the documents which should be carried on board aircraft in the conduct of and inspect compliance of those aerial navigation aircraft registered in the State.

8. Promulgate the rules which ensure protection of aerial navigation lights and signals, in coordination with the local authorities.

9. Undertake the Air Traffic Control operations in the State.

10. Ensure enforcement of accepted international regulations and standards at airports of the State, including the aviation agreement, and following up their execution in coordination with the local authority.

11. Promulgate and organize training programs as appropriate to various aviation specialties.

12. Supervise the maintenance and repair of aircraft and the extent of conformity of manufacture with international and local specifications, and the locations in which such maintenance and repair are accomplished, and issue the necessary certificates and licenses for conducting such activities.

== Sectors and departments ==
UAE GCAA organization structure

- Air Navigation Service Provider (ANSP) is structured along standard ICAO principles. The responsibilities include airspace design and the provision of safe and efficient air navigation service to the users of the UAE airspace.
- Safety Affairs is responsible for safety technical functions such as flight operations, airworthiness and aviation environment, licensing and certifications as well as air navigation and aerodromes. Safety Affairs is also responsible for supporting the UAE Federal Government in the definition of national safety policies, developing and issuing regulations, certify, license, oversee, support the development of policies for all technical domains of responsibility, coordinating national and international technical strategic agreements and providing technical experts for the air accidents and incidents investigation.
- Security Affairs is responsible for supporting the UAE Federal Government in the development and review of national aviation security policies and legislation.
- Strategy & International Affairs plays a critical role in helping the organization to identify, develop, implement and monitor Business Excellence initiatives, concepts and sustain integration of Management Systems across the board to ensure continuous quality improvement in every business units.
- Support Services provide essential administrative, financial and support service throughout the organization.
- Air Accident Investigation is responsible for the investigation of civil accidents and incidents within and outside the UAE in accordance with Annex 13 to the ICAO Convention. The purpose of the department is to enhance aviation safety by determining through investigation, the Findings and Significant Factors that lead to Safety Recommendations intended to prevent reoccurrence. It is not to purpose of this activity to apportion blame or liability.

== Facilities ==
The GCAA headquarters are in Abu Dhabi. The headquarters, built after the GCAA's establishment as a former directorate, includes an air traffic control center and supporting facilities. In June 2009, GCAA shifted its Air Navigation Services to the newly built Sheikh Zayed Air Navigation Centre in Abu Dhabi. The Sheikh Zayed Centre is considered the largest and busiest air traffic management facility in the Middle East as well as one of the world's most technically advanced centres in terms of its design. The Air Navigation Centre consists of two main buildings, the Area Control Centre (ACC) and Emergency ACC. It also has four 60 meter masts for communication equipments. In addition to the Abu Dhabi headquarters, the GCAA also has a regional office in Dubai. The facilities of the Dubai offices, established to serve Dubai and the northern emirates, were also constructed after the GCAA was established.

== See also ==
- Azza Transport Flight 2241
- UPS Flight 6
