= Nicole W. Biggart =

American academic and sociologist

Nicole Woolsey Biggart is an American sociologist, organizational theorist, and academic known for her expertise in economic and organizational sociology, management of innovation, and energy efficiency.

She is a Professor Emerita at the University of California, Davis, where she has had a career, including serving as Dean of the Graduate School of Management from 2003 to 2009. Biggart has also held the Chevron Chair in Energy Efficiency and directed the UC Davis Energy Efficiency Center from 2010 to 2015.

== Biography ==
She was born in Brooklyn NY on June 7, 1947 and grew up in Paramus, New Jersey. As a high school student, she was selected as an American Field Service exchange student, where her experience of living with a Muslim family in Turkey was one of several that turned her interests toward sociology. Another was her work among the personal staff of the Postmaster General during the Nixon administration. The post office, the largest non-military organization in the world, was undergoing dramatic political and industrial change during her tenure. Biggart wrote her PhD dissertation “The Magic Circle: Personal Staffs in Public Bureaucracies” during the post-Watergate era.

She received her Ph.D. in economic sociology from the University of California, Berkeley with a dissertation titled The Magic Circle: A Study of Personal Staffs in the Administrations of Governors Ronald Reagan and Jerry Brown, M.A. in sociology from the University of California, Davis, and a B.A. in communication from Simmons College.

Professor Biggart was Dean of the UC Davis Graduate School of Management and was a founding faculty member of the school. She did sabbaticals at the Cambridge University as the Arthur Anderson Visiting Scholar at Judge Business School and Visiting Fellow at St. John’s College, and at Cardiff Business School.

=== Academic career ===
Biggart joined UC Davis in 1981 as one of the founding faculty members of the Graduate School of Management. She held various academic positions, ultimately becoming a professor of management. In 2003, she was appointed Dean of the Graduate School of Management, a role she held until 2009.

During her tenure, she oversaw the school's strategic planning, curriculum development, and research activities.

From 2010 to 2015, Biggart held the Chevron Chair in Energy Efficiency and directed the UC Davis Energy Efficiency Center. In 2015, she became Professor Emerita, marking the conclusion of her active academic career at UC Davis.

=== Other activities ===
In addition to her academic contributions, Biggart has held leadership positions in several professional organizations, including the Academy of Management, the Society for the Advancement of Socio-Economics, and the American Sociological Association.

Biggart also served on the scientific advisory board for the Max Planck Institute for the Study of Societies in Cologne, Germany. She currently serves on board of Inventopia (inventopia.org) and Sierra Energy (sierra energy.com). In addition to Fellow of the AAAS, she was Chair of the Section on Social, Economic and Political Sciences.

== Research ==
Biggart's research focuses on organizational theory, innovation management, economic and organizational sociology, and industrial change. Her work examines firm networks, the social bases of technology adoption, and business clusters.

She has studied a wide array of sectors, organizations, and markets globally, including the automotive industries of South Korea, Taiwan, Spain, and Argentina, the U.S. commercial building industry, and management strategies in Japan.

Biggart's research has explored topics, including labor and leisure sociology, organizational change, and the sociological explanations behind organizational scandals. Among her notable works is Charismatic Capitalism: Direct Selling Organizations in America (1989), which examines direct selling organizations, and Economic Sociology: A Reader (2001), a key textbook in the field. She has also contributed extensively to reports and studies, including work for the National Research Council on organizational performance and human enhancement.

== Awards ==
In 2008, she received the Faculty Award for Pioneer Sustainability in Management Education from the Aspen Institute and was honored with the Women Who Mean Business Award by the Sacramento Business Journal in the same year. Additionally, she was named a Fellow of the American Association for the Advancement of Science in 2013.

== Selected publications ==
=== Books ===
- Hamilton, Gary G.; Biggart, Nicole Woolsey (1984). Governor Reagan - Governor Brown: a sociology of executive power. New York, NY: Columbia University Press. ISBN 978-0-231-05903-9.
- Biggart, Nicole Woolsey (1990). Charismatic Capitalism. University of Chicago Press. doi:10.7208/chicago/9780226227269.001.0001. ISBN 978-0-226-04786-7.
- Biggart, Nicole Woolsey, ed. (2002). Readings in economic sociology. Blackwell readers in sociology (First published ed.). Malden, Massachusetts Oxford, UK: Blackwell. ISBN 978-0-631-22862-2.

=== Journals ===
- Beamish, Thomas D.; Biggart, Nicole Woolsey (2017), Capital and Carbon: The Shifting Common Good Justification of Energy Regimes, Research in the Sociology of Organizations, vol. 52, Emerald Publishing Limited, pp. 173–205, doi:10.1108/s0733-558x20170000052006, ISBN 978-1-78714-380-7<
- Beamish, Thomas D.; Biggart, Nicole Woolsey (2015-03-28), "Social Heuristics: The Pragmatics of Convention in Decision-Making", Research in the Sociology of Organizations, Emerald Group Publishing Limited, pp. 235–282, doi:10.1108/s0733-558x20150000044010, ISBN 978-1-78441-726-0
- Biscotti, Dina; Biggart, Nicole Woolsey (2014-04-16), "Organizing belief: Interfaith social change organizations in the religious-environmental movement", Research in the Sociology of Organizations, Emerald Group Publishing Limited, pp. 413–439, doi:10.1108/s0733-558x_2014_0000041019, ISBN 978-1-78190-692-7
- Biggart, Nicole Woolsey (2013-08-02). "Foreword: Integrating the Social into the Built Environment". Constructing Green: ix–xiv. doi:10.7551/mitpress/9233.003.0001. ISBN 978-0-262-31538-8.
- Beamish, Thomas D.; Biggart, Nicole Woolsey (2012). "The role of social heuristics in project-centred production networks: insights from the commercial construction industry". Engineering Project Organization Journal. 2 (1–2): 57–70. doi:10.1080/21573727.2011.637192. ISSN 2157-3727.
