= Investopia =

UAE annual investment summit

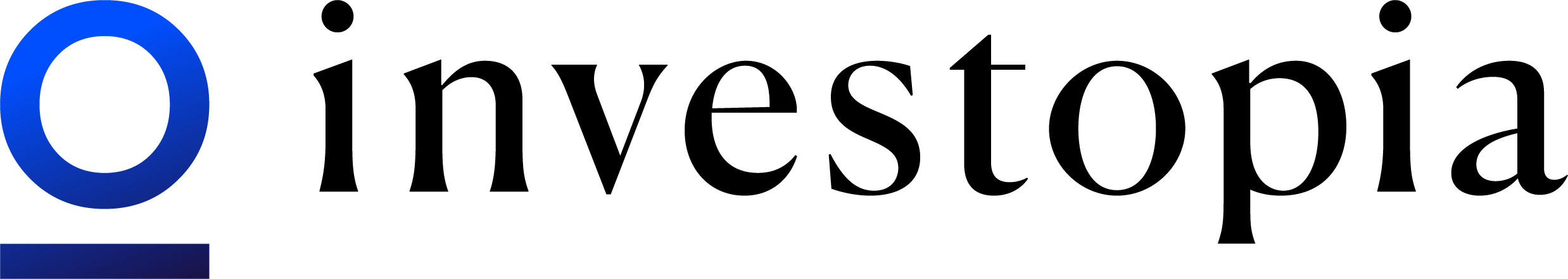
- Type: State-owned
- Industry: Investment
- Founded: September 2021; 4 years ago
- Headquarters: UAE
- Key people: Sheikh Mohammed bin Rashid Al Maktoum (Vice President and Prime Minister of the UAE and Ruler of Dubai); Abdulla bin Touq Al Marri (UAE Minister of Investment & Chairman of Investopia)
- Website: investopia.ae

Investopia was launched in 2021 by Mohammed bin Rashid Al Maktoum, Prime Minister of the UAE and Ruler of Dubai, and Abdulla bin Touq Al Marri, the UAE's Minister of Economy.

Its inaugural edition was held during Expo 2020, with attendees from different countries. Following this, Investopia launched its Global Talks series in various international cities including New York, Geneva, New Delhi, Mumbai, Milan, Cairo, Rabat, Havana, and Ahmedabad.

Investopia comprises three pillars: The Dialogue, a platform for discussion on economic trends and sectors ; The Communities, which involves interactions among various stakeholders, including those from the private and public sectors and businesses; and The Marketplace, a platform where fund managers and allocators can facilitate capital introductions.

== History ==
Investopia was launched in 2021 by Sheikh Mohammed Bin Rashid Al Maktoum, Prime Minister of the UAE and Ruler of Dubai, and Abdulla bin Touq Al Marri, the UAE's Minister of Economy as part of the Projects of the 50.

In March 2022, the UAE registered the Investopia Summit as its first trademark under the Madrid Protocol. Later, in the same month, Investopia announced a series of partnerships. The agreement named Crypto.com as the exclusive cryptocurrency platform for the summit, set to coincide with the World Government Summit on March 28.

In September 2022, Investopia, in partnership with the Abu Dhabi Department of Economic Development (ADDED), held a session in which it was announced that Investopia's next annual conference will be held in Abu Dhabi for March 2023.

In December 2022, Investopia hosted a special event in partnership with the World Corporate Summit (WCS) focused on the Future of Investment in Sports within the context of the FIFA World Cup 2022.

== Annual summits and events ==
=== Investopia's inaugural edition ===
In March 2022, the first Investopia summit was held in Dubai alongside the World Government Summit. It focused on the evolving dynamics of global growth hubs and the changing landscape of globalization in the context of ongoing geopolitical developments. It also included an economic press conference in the Metaverse, where journalists could join via augmented and virtual reality.

=== Investopia's second edition ===
In 2023, the second Investopia Summit took place at the Hilton Abu Dhabi Yas Island with the central theme of "Envisioning Opportunities in Times of Change." The summit was further segmented into three sub-themes: "Envisioning Opportunities in Today’s Economy," "The Future of National Wealth," and "Growth Opportunities in Times of Decarbonisation."

The two-day event provided a platform for participants to exchange knowledge, engage in seminars, and establish agreements with local businesses and investors.

=== Investopia's third edition ===
In December 2023, Investopia announced its third edition to take place on the 28 and 29 of February 2024 in Abu Dhabi, under the theme "Emerging Economic Frontiers: Investing in the New Economy".

=== Investopia Europe ===
In May 2023, Milan hosted the first Investopia Europe which was part of a series of global dialogues, aimed to foster foreign direct investment. It also marked the eighth in a series of global dialogues and the first such event in Europe.

=== Investopia Global Talks: The Future of Investment in Sports ===
In December 2022, Investopia, Investopia held a conference named the Future of Investment in Sports in Dubai. The conference also coincided with the FIFA World Cup in Qatar and accordingly covered topics from sports media to advanced stadium development in separate sessions attended by notable attendees such as Abdulla bin Touq Al Marri and Bernard Caiazzo.

=== Investopia Global Ahmedabad ===
In July 2026, Investopia Global Ahmedabad was held in Gandhinagar, Gujarat, India. The event brought together government officials, investors and business leaders from India and the United Arab Emirates to discuss economic cooperation and investment opportunities. The inaugural session was attended by Gujarat Chief Minister Bhupendrabhai Patel and UAE Minister of Economy and Tourism Abdulla bin Touq Al Marri. Discussions focused on areas including trade, financial services, logistics, digital infrastructure, food security and advanced manufacturing.

== Marketplace ==
In March 2023, Investopia launched a new pillar called Marketplace during the second Investopia summit. The Marketplace serves as a platform for capital introduction activities, facilitating interactions between fund managers and allocators.

== Notable speakers ==
- Abdulla bin Touq Al Marri, Emirati politician
- Thani bin Ahmed Al Zeyoudi, Emirati politician
- Khaldoon Al Mubarak, Emirati government official
- Omar Al Olama, Emirati minister
- Joanna Shields, British politician
- Anthony Scaramucci, American financier
- Edward David Burt, Premier of Bermuda
- Larry Fink, American business executive
- Khaldoon Al Mubarak, Emirati business executive
- Makhtar Diop, Senegalese economist
- Rebeca Grynspan, Costa Rican economist
- Piyush Goyal, Indian politician
- Janet Henry, British economist
