= Vice President of the United Arab Emirates =

Deputy head of state of the United Arab Emirates

- نائب رئيس دولة الإمارات العربية المتحدة
- Emblem of the United Arab Emirates

- Flag of the United Arab Emirates

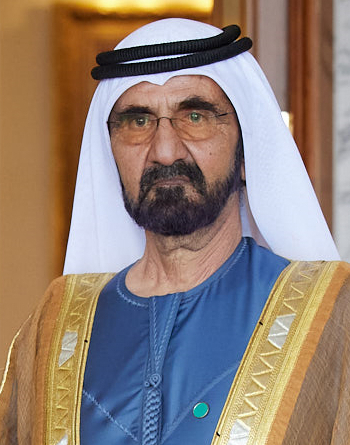
Mohammed bin Rashid Al Maktoum

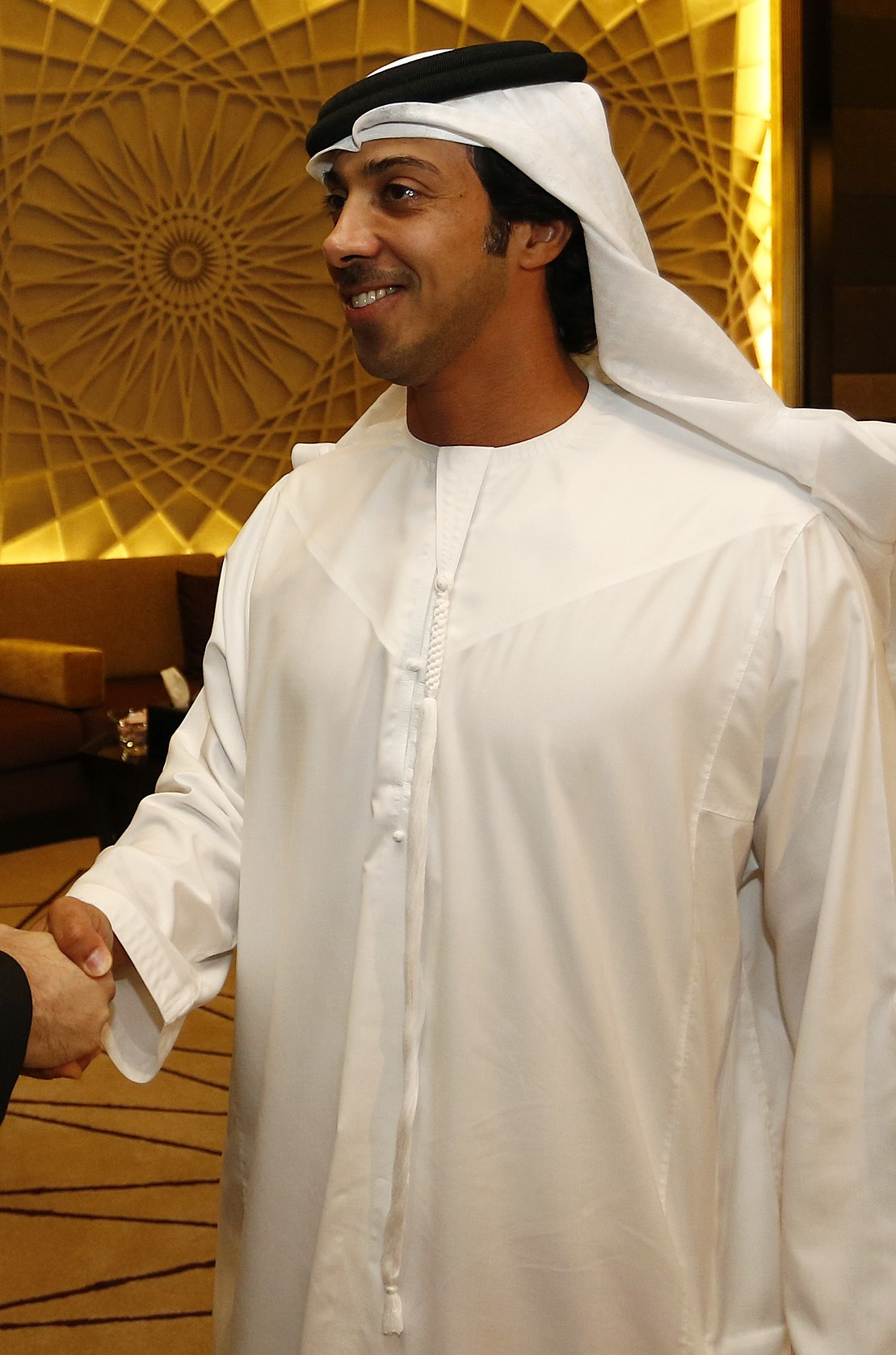
Mansour bin Zayed Al Nahyan
Incumbent
- Mohammed bin Rashid Al Maktoum
- since 5 January 2006
- Mansour bin Zayed Al Nahyan
- since 29 March 2023
- Politics of the United Arab Emirates
- Style: His Highness
- Reports to: President
- Appointer: Federal Supreme Council
- Term length: 5 years, renewable
- Constituting instrument: Constitution of the United Arab Emirates
- Inaugural holder: Rashid bin Saeed Al Maktoum
- Formation: 9 December 1971

The vice president of the United Arab Emirates is the deputy head of state of the United Arab Emirates. The office holder will perform all the responsibilities of the President of the United Arab Emirates in the latter's absence for any reason.

The vice president is elected by the Federal Supreme Council from among its members for renewable five-year terms. While not required by the constitution, the practice is that the ruler of Dubai simultaneously serves as a vice president of the UAE.

The first vice president, Rashid bin Saeed Al Maktoum, took office on 2 December 1971. Every prime minister since 1979 also held the title of vice president.

== List of officeholders (1971–present) ==
No.	Portrait	Name (Lifespan)	Term of office			Emirate	Notes
No.	Portrait	Name (Lifespan)	Took office	Left office	Time in office	Emirate	Notes
1		Rashid bin Saeed Al Maktoum راشد بن سعيد آل مكتوم (1912–1990)	9 December 1971	7 October 1990 (Died in office)	18 years, 302 days	Dubai	
2		Maktoum bin Rashid Al Maktoum مكتوم بن راشد آل مكتوم (1943–2006)	7 October 1990	4 January 2006 (Died in office)	15 years, 89 days	Dubai	
3		Mohammed bin Rashid Al Maktoum محمد بن راشد آل مكتوم (born 1949)	5 January 2006	Incumbent	20 years, 258 days	Dubai	
4		Mansour bin Zayed Al Nahyan منصور بن زايد بن سلطان آل نهيان (born 1970)	29 March 2023	Incumbent	3 years, 175 days	Abu Dhabi	

== See also ==
- President of the United Arab Emirates
- List of prime ministers of the United Arab Emirates
