= Mansour bin Zayed Al Nahyan =

Vice President of the United Arab Emirates

Mansour bin Zayed Al Nahyan: منصور بن زايد آل نهيان
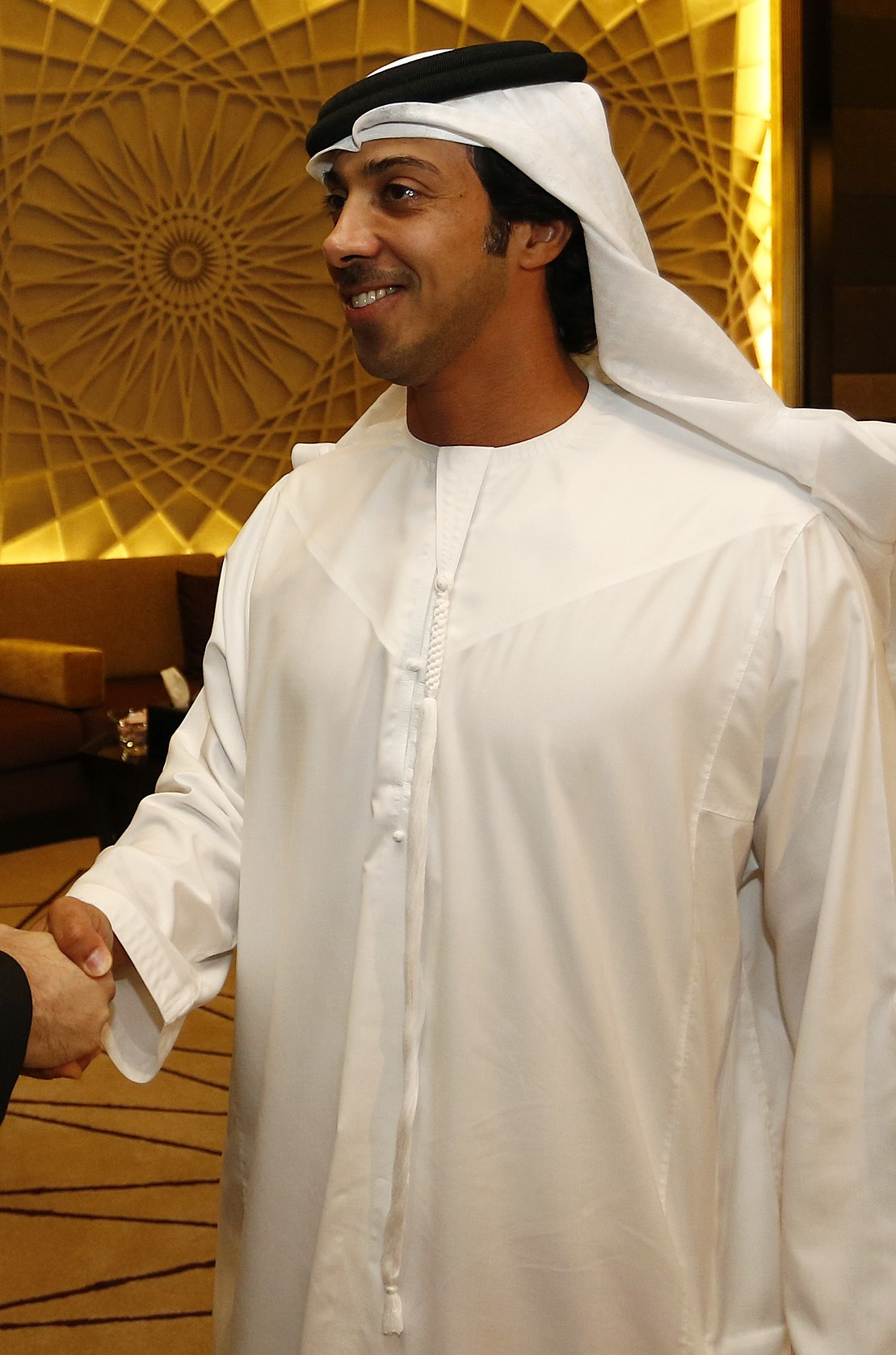
- Sheikh Mansour in 2013

Vice President of the United Arab Emirates
- Incumbent
- Assumed office 29 March 2023 Serving with Mohammed bin Rashid Al Maktoum
- President: Mohamed bin Zayed Al Nahyan

Deputy Prime Minister of the United Arab Emirates
- Incumbent
- Assumed office 10 May 2009 Serving with 4 other people
- President: Khalifa bin Zayed Al Nahyan; Mohamed bin Zayed Al Nahyan
- Prime Minister: Mohammed bin Rashid Al Maktoum
- Preceded by: Sultan bin Zayed Al Nahyan; Hamdan bin Zayed Al Nahyan

Minister of Presidential Court of the United Arab Emirates
- Incumbent
- Assumed office 1 November 2004
- President: Khalifa bin Zayed Al Nahyan; Mohamed bin Zayed Al Nahyan
- Prime Minister: Mohammed bin Rashid Al Maktoum
- Born: 20 November 1970 (age 55); Abu Dhabi, Trucial States
- Spouse: Alia bint Mohammed bin Butti Al Hamed (m. 1994); Manal bint Mohammed Al Maktoum (m. 2005)
- Issue: Zayed; Fatima; Mohammed; Hamdan; Latifa; Rashid
- House: Al Nahyan
- Father: Zayed bin Sultan Al Nahyan
- Mother: Fatima bint Mubarak Al Ketbi
- Education: United Arab Emirates University

Styles of Sheikh Mansour bin Zayed bin Sultan bin Zayed bin Khalifa Al Nahyan
- Reference style: His Highness
- Spoken style: Your Highness

Sheikh Mansour bin Zayed bin Sultan Al Nahyan (Arabic: منصور بن زايد بن سلطان آل نهيان; born 20 November 1970), simply referred to as Sheikh Mansour, is an Emirati royal and politician who is a current vice president and deputy prime minister of the United Arab Emirates, as well as the minister of presidential court and member of the ruling family of Abu Dhabi. He is the brother of the current president of the UAE, Sheikh Mohamed bin Zayed Al Nahyan, and is married to Sheikha Manal bint Mohammed Al Maktoum, daughter of Sheikh Mohammed bin Rashid Al Maktoum, the ruler of Dubai. A billionaire, he holds stakes in a variety of football clubs through City Football Group, including Premier League club Manchester City F.C.

Mansour controls several key Emirati institutions, such as the UAE Central Bank, the Abu Dhabi National Oil Company (ADNOC), and the Abu Dhabi criminal authority. He is chairman of the two UAE sovereign wealth funds (Emirates Investment Authority, Mubadala Investment Company) and a board member of a third (Abu Dhabi Investment Authority).

Mansour has played a key role in various UAE foreign policy endeavors. He was involved in efforts to bolster Khalifa Haftar in the Libyan Civil War, build an alliance with Sudanese ruler and war criminal Omar al-Bashir, and secretly provide arms transfers to Sudanese General Mohamed Hamdan whose forces have engaged in massacres, mass rapes and genocide.

Mansour is the owner of the Abu Dhabi United Group (ADUG), an investment company for the Abu Dhabi royal family, that acquired Manchester City in September 2008. The football club has overseen a significant transformation since the takeover, having won eight top-flight league titles, including its first in 44 years and first Premier League title in 2012 and the Champions League title in 2023. Mansour owns multiple other sports clubs, including New York City FC in Major League Soccer. Human rights groups and other critics have characterized Mansour's sports investments as sportswashing to improve the image of the UAE amid its controversial human rights record.

== Early life and education ==
Mansour was born in the Emirate of Abu Dhabi on 21 November 1970, the fifth son of the Emir of Abu Dhabi Sheikh Zayed bin Sultan Al Nahyan. His mother is Sheikha Fatima bint Mubarak Al Ketbi and he has five full-brothers: Mohammed, Hamdan, Hazza, Tahnoun, and Abdullah. They are known as Bani Fatima or sons of Fatima.

Mansour attended Santa Barbara Community College as an English student in 1989. He is a graduate of the United Arab Emirates University where he received a bachelor's degree in international affairs in 1993.

== Political career ==
In 1997, Sheikh Mansour was appointed chairman of the presidential office, at which time his father Sheikh Zayed was the president of the UAE. After the death of his father, he was appointed by his eldest half-brother, Sheikh Khalifa bin Zayed Al Nahyan, as the first minister of presidential affairs of the United Arab Emirates, following a merger of the presidential office and presidential court. He also served in a number of positions in Abu Dhabi to support his brother, Sheikh Mohammed bin Zayed Al Nahyan, who was still the Crown Prince at the time.

He was appointed chairman of the ministerial council for services (now Ministerial Development Council). Since 2000 he chaired National Center for Documentation and Research. In the 2004 reshuffle, he became minister for presidential affairs. In 2005, he became the deputy chairman of the Abu Dhabi Education Council (ADEC), chairman of the Emirates Foundation, Abu Dhabi Food Control Authority, and Abu Dhabi Fund for Development. In 2006, he was named the chairman of the Abu Dhabi Judicial Department. In 2007, he was appointed chairman of Khalifa bin Zayed Charity Foundation.

Mansour served as the chairman of First Gulf Bank until 2006, and as a member of the board of trustees of the Zayed charitable and humanitarian foundation. Mansour has established scholarship programs for UAE students to study abroad. He is also chairman of the Emirates horse racing authority (EHRA). On 11 May 2009, he was appointed deputy prime minister, retaining his cabinet post of minister of presidential affairs. On 29 March 2023, with the approval of the UAE Federal Supreme Council, the UAE president Sheikh Mohamed bin Zayed Al Nahyan issued a resolution, appointing Mansour as the country's second vice president, to serve alongside Sheikh Mohammed bin Rashid Al Maktoum, vice president and prime minister of the UAE and ruler of Dubai.

In October 2022, whilst Mansour's tenure as deputy prime minister, he was accused of helping Roman Abramovich and other wealthy Russian oligarchs evade sanctions during the 2022 Russian invasion of Ukraine. He was described as being "central" to the flow of sanctioned Russian assets to the UAE.

=== Business portfolio ===
Mansour is the chairman of the Emirati state-owned Mubadala Investment Company. He was formerly chairman of IPIC. After the 1Malaysia Development Berhad (1MDB) scandal was highlighted and Khadem al-Qubaisi, who was managing IPIC, was arrested in 2016, IPIC was folded into Aabar Investments. Qubaisi blamed Mansour and the UAE authorities for using him as a scapegoat in the affair.

In 2005, he was appointed as a member of the Supreme Petroleum Council. In the same year, he chaired the board of directors of IPIC and became a board member of the Abu Dhabi Investment Authority (ADIA). In 2007, he was appointed chairman of the Emirates Investment Authority, the sovereign wealth fund of UAE.

Mansour has a 32% stake in Virgin Galactic after investing $280 million in the project through Aabar in July 2009. Aabar also has a 9.1% stake in Daimler after purchasing the stake for $2.7 billion in March 2009 and it was reported that Aabar wishes to increase its stake to 15% in August 2010. He owns the Abu Dhabi Media Investment Corporation (ADMIC) which partnered with British Sky Broadcasting to establish Sky News Arabia – a new Arabic-language news channel headquartered in Abu Dhabi. ADMIC also owns the English-language newspaper The National, and bought a 2.1% stake in pan-European channel Euronews in 2017.

=== Sport ===
Mansour is an accomplished horse rider who has won a number of endurance racing tournaments held in the Middle East. He is chairman of the Emirates horse racing authority. In late 2024 he purchased the Thoroughbred horse breeding farm, Haras de Fresnay-le-Buffard in Neuvy-au-Houlme for €28 million. He is a patron of the annual Zayed International Half Marathon competition in Abu Dhabi.

He is chairman of the Al Jazira sports company and was a leading figure in Abu Dhabi's successful bid to host the FIFA Club World Cup in 2009 and 2010. The company owns Al Jazira, which plays football, volleyball, handball, and basketball. The football club won the President's Cup in 2010–2011, 2011–2012 and 2015–2016.

=== Ownership of Manchester City ===
In September 2008, Mansour acquired Manchester City from former Thai prime minister Thaksin Shinawatra. By 23 September 2008, the Abu Dhabi United Group, backed by Mansour, completed their takeover negotiations and the ownership was transferred to them. He also owns the City Football Group, which was founded in 2014 and consists of Manchester City, Bahia, Melbourne City, New York City FC, Mumbai City and others. Mansour has only been to two Manchester City games in his time as owner, in 2010 and 2023, the latter being the 2023 UEFA Champions League final.

In 2023, a leak by The Times confirmed that City owners made sponsorship payments of £30 million to the club in two parts in 2012 and 2013. As per an unpublished 2020 UEFA report, the payments were "disguised equity funding" and did not come from Etisalat. A financial broker, Jaber Mohamed, assisted Sheikh Mansour and ADUG in facilitating the payments. In 2025, The Athletic revealed that Jaber Mohamed has served as the General Director of the Abu Dhabi Crown Prince's Court (CPC) and was one of the two senior aides of Mohamed bin Zayed (MbZ). Another senior aide of MbZ and undersecretary at CPC, Mohamed Al Mazrouei also served at City’s board.

== Personal life ==
Sheikh Mansour married Sheikha Alia bint Mohammed bin Butti Al Hamed in the mid-1990s. They have one son together, Zayed, who married Sheikha Meera bint Hazza bin Zayed Al Nahyan in May 2022.

In 2005, Mansour married Sheikha Manal bint Mohammed bin Rashid Al Maktoum, the daughter of Sheikh Mohammed bin Rashid Al Maktoum. They have two daughters and three sons: Fatima (2006), Mohammed (2007), Hamdan (2011), Latifa (2014), and Rashid (2017).

== Controversies ==
Mansour bin Zayed was described by The New York Times as the Sheikh who plays a silent yet powerful role in strengthening the UAE’s soft power through the ownership of Manchester City. But, the Premier League team was alleged of manipulating its finances to acquire top-notch players. A UEFA report concluded that Sheikh Mansour and ADUG facilitated sponsorship payments to the club through a financial broker. Under the soft power strategy, Sheikh Mansour also strived to bolster the Emirati ambitions in global media, acquiring the Arabic television stations and websites for Sky News and CNN. In 2023, Mansour reached a deal worth $600 million to acquire The Daily Telegraph through his firm International Media Investments (IMI), but the British government blocked the takeover over concerns about national security and press freedom.

Sheikh Mansour also took the role of a "handler" under the Emirates' hard power strategy, managing the country's secret conflicts in Egypt, Libya, Yemen and Sudan. Mansour built relations with unreformed warlords and autocrats that were being supported by the UAE in the proxy wars. He was found keeping a regular contact with military commander Khalifa Haftar, who was being backed by the UAE in the Libyan war. In Sudan, Mansour was involved in shifting Omar al-Bashir's alliance from Iran to the UAE, providing him with billions of dollars in funds. Al-Bashir assisted the UAE in the Yemen war and deployed his troops to serve the Emirati interests. Mansour also hosted General Mohamed Hamdan at an arms fair in the UAE, two months before the Sudan war started in April 2023. Charities controlled by Mansour were a cover for smuggling armaments to Hamdan's forces, which have engaged in massacres, mass rapes and genocide. In January 2026, UK-based human rights organisation Christian Solidarity Worldwide launched a campaign calling on the English Premier League to hold Mansour to account for the UAE's role in the war in Sudan.

Mansour's luxurious life and interest in collecting superyachts led him to acquire the Topaz worth US$688 million. The US prosecutors found the yacht was funded using proceeds of the 1MDB scandal. Mansour was listed as a co-conspirator in the fraud and was put at the top of a "hierarchy of bribes" in the case. He never faced charges related to scandal, but his firms agreed to pay $1.8 billion to Malaysia in 2023.

His Mubadala wealth fund paid the 2 billion US dollars into the Trump and Witkoff family´s World Liberty crypto company in May 2025.

== Honours ==
- Honorary Knight Commander of The Most Excellent Order of the British Empire (2013)
