= Ministry of Economy & Tourism =

Federal ministry of the Government of the United Arab Emirates

- وزارة الاقتصاد والسياحة (Arabic)

Ministry overview
- Formed: 20 June 2020; 6 years ago
- Preceding Ministry: Ministry of Economy
- Jurisdiction: Government of the United Arab Emirates
- Headquarters: Abu Dhabi, United Arab Emirates
- Minister responsible: Abdulla bin Touq Al Marri, Minister
- Ministry executive: Abdulla Ahmed Al Saleh, Undersecretary
- Parent department: Cabinet of the United Arab Emirates
- Website: moet.gov.ae

Ministry of Economy & Tourism (Arabic: وزارة الاقتصاد والسياحة) is a federal ministry of the Government of the United Arab Emirates responsible for economic policy at the federal level and for developing and coordinating national tourism strategy.

The ministry was created on 20 June 2025 when the former Ministry of Economy was renamed; at the same time, a separate Ministry of Foreign Trade was established.

Its remit includes consumer protection, intellectual property administration, domestic economic policy and SME development, and it leads federal coordination on tourism policy through the Emirates Tourism Council.

Abdulla bin Touq Al Marri is the current Minister of Economy & Tourism.

== History ==
The federal economy portfolio was held by the Ministry of Economy prior to 2025. Sheikha Lubna bint Khalid Al Qasimi became the UAE’s first female cabinet minister when she was appointed to the economy portfolio in November 2004, serving until 2008.

Sultan bin Saeed Al Mansouri was appointed Minister of Economy on 17 February 2008 and served until 2020, during which a new organisational structure for the ministry was approved by the Cabinet in 2008.

Abdulla bin Touq Al Marri was appointed Minister of Economy in July 2020 as part of a government restructure that added ministers of state for foreign trade and for entrepreneurship/SMEs within the ministry.

On 20 June 2025 the UAE government established a separate Ministry of Foreign Trade and renamed the Ministry of Economy as the Ministry of Economy & Tourism, led by Abdulla bin Touq Al Marri.

== Structure ==
The ministry is headed by the Minister of Economy & Tourism and supported by an Undersecretary. The following have been ministers responsible for the federal economy portfolio and, since 2025, the economy and tourism portfolio:

- Sheikha Lubna bint Khalid Al Qasimi – 2004–2008 (Minister of Economy / Economy and Planning).
- Sultan bin Saeed Al Mansouri – 2008–2020 (Minister of Economy).
- Abdulla bin Touq Al Marri – 2020–present (Minister of Economy 2020–2025; Minister of Economy & Tourism from 2025).

As of 2025, the Undersecretary is Abdulla Ahmed Al Saleh.

== See also ==
- Economy of the United Arab Emirates
- Tourism in the United Arab Emirates
- Cabinet of the United Arab Emirates
- Government of the United Arab Emirates
