= Ministry of Investment (United Arab Emirates) =

Government ministry of the United Arab Emirates

- وزارة الاستثمار (Arabic)
- Logo of the Ministry of Investment

Ministry overview
- Formed: July 2023; 2 years ago
- Jurisdiction: Federal government of the United Arab Emirates
- Headquarters: Abu Dhabi, United Arab Emirates
- Minister responsible: Mohamed Hassan Al Suwaidi, Minister of Investment
- Website: investuae.gov.ae

The Ministry of Investment (Arabic: وزارة الاستثمار) is a federal government ministry in the United Arab Emirates (UAE), established in 2023. The ministry is responsible for promoting and facilitating investments in the UAE, attracting foreign direct investment (FDI), and supporting the nation’s economic diversification goals. It serves as a central entity for coordinating investment strategies, ensuring the UAE’s position as a global hub for business and innovation.

== History ==
The Ministry of Investment was officially established in 2023 through a federal directive issued by His Highness Sheikh Mohamed bin Zayed Al Nahyan, President of the UAE, to align with the country’s long-term economic strategy.

The formation of the ministry marked a significant step in the UAE’s efforts to strengthen its investment ecosystem and attract sustainable, innovation-driven investments. Mohamed Hassan Al Suwaidi was appointed as the UAE’s first Minister of Investment.

== Key Initiatives ==
=== Invest UAE Portal ===
The ministry operates the Invest UAE Portal a comprehensive platform offering resources for investors. The portal provides details on investment opportunities, regulatory frameworks, and sector-specific insights.

=== Investment Forums ===
The Ministry of Investment regularly hosts international forums and roadshows to engage with global investors. In October 2024, the ministry co-hosted Investopia Global in Monaco. In the same month, the Ministry of Investment also hosted UAE-Norway investment forum in Oslo.

== Leadership ==
The Ministry is headed by Mohamed Hassan Al Suwaidi, who was appointed as the first Minister of Investment in 2023. Al Suwaidi has experience in managing large-scale investments and previously held key leadership roles in various UAE-based sovereign wealth funds, including the Abu Dhabi Developmental Holding Company (ADQ).
