= Abdulla bin Touq Al Marri =

Emirati politician

His Excellency Abdullah bin Touq Al Marri
- عبد الله بن طوق المري
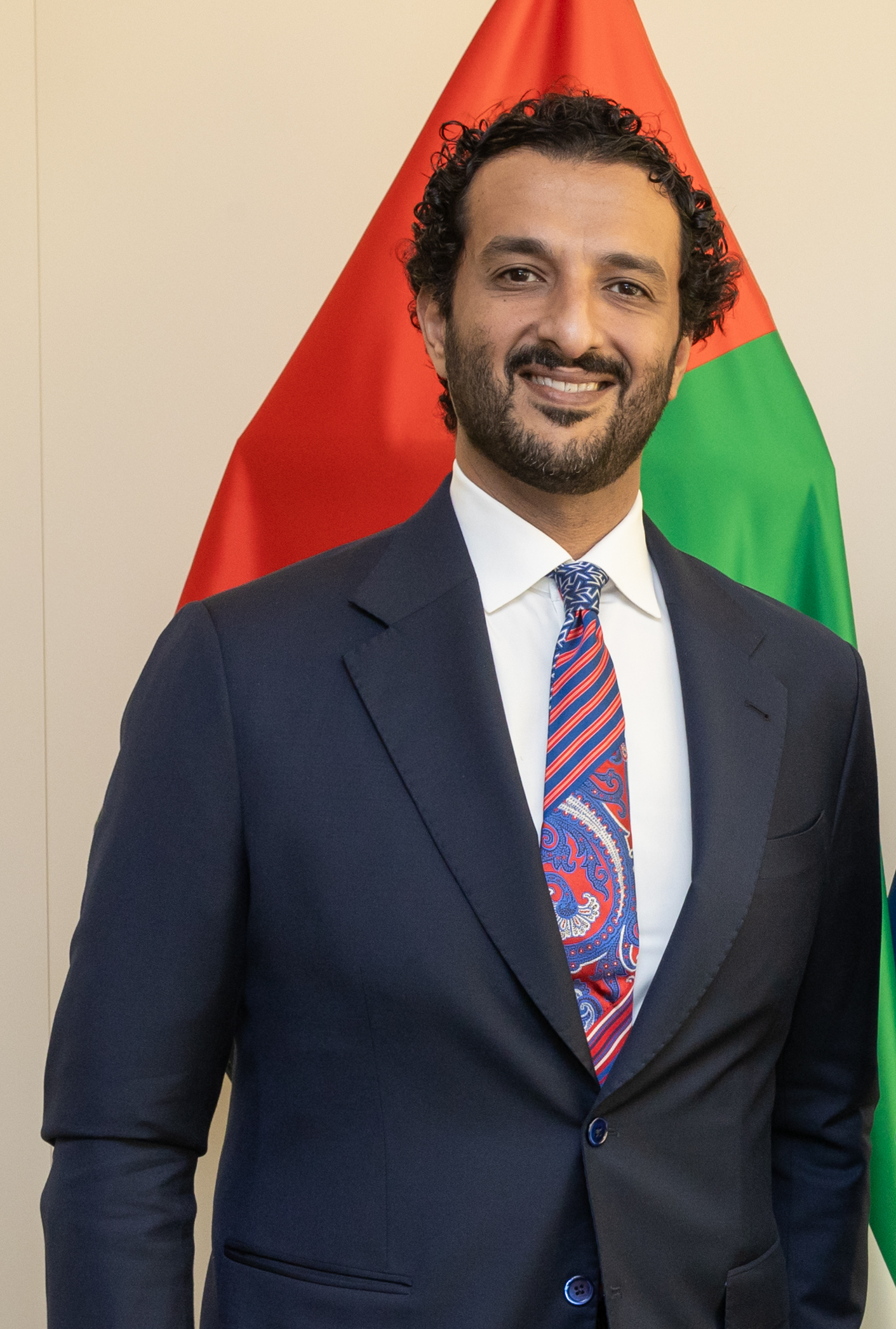
- Al Marri in 2024

Minister of Economy and Tourism
- Incumbent
- Assumed office 1 July 2020
- President: Khalifa bin Zayed Al Nahyan (2009–2022); Mohamed bin Zayed Al Nahyan (2022–present)
- Prime Minister: Mohammed bin Rashid Al Maktoum

Personal details
- Born: 1982 (age 43–44)
- Education: University of Sheffield (Bachelor's degree in civil engineering)

Abdulla bin Touq Al Marri (Arabic: عبدالله بن طوق المري; born 1982) is an Emirati politician. He has been the United Arab Emirates's Minister of Economy & Tourism since July 2020 and was Chairman of the Securities and Commodities Authority. He is a former Secretary General of the UAE Cabinet, a supportive body within the government that assists it in implementing decisions.

== Education ==
Al Marri holds a bachelor's degree in Civil Engineering, which he obtained at the University of Sheffield in 2005. He is a graduate of the UAE Government Leaders Program and the Mohammed Bin Rashid Center for Leadership Development.

== Career ==
Al Marri joined the Prime Minister's Office in 2007, moved on to become Director General of the Executive Office, then CEO and later Cabinet Member of the Dubai Future Foundation. He was appointed Secretary-General of the UAE Cabinet in October 2017. He is chairman of the General Civil Aviation Authority, the Securities and Commissions Authority, the Federal Company Etihad Credit Insurance (ECI), the UAE International Investors Council, and CSR UAE Fund's board of trustees. He is also part of MIT REAP Team Dubai and on the Board of Directors of the Federal Competitiveness and Statistics Authority.

=== Minister of Economy ===
Al Marri assumed his position as Minister of Economy after a new governmental structure was approved in July 2020; Ministry of Economy functions were split, with Ministers Ahmed Belhoul and Thani Ahmed Al Zeyoudi assuming other responsibilities.

In October 2020, he was part of the first UAE delegation to Israel following the 2020 Israel–United Arab Emirates normalization agreement, a development he championed as “wonderful”. He credited the accords for opening “new avenues for strengthened collaboration and exchange between the UAE and Israel” and a “framework for bilateral trade and economic ties”, including diversifying the UAE's economy away from oil. As minister, he worked to “digitize” the UAE's economy to create a new development model through investments in "high tech areas".

In 2021, he launched an investment summit named, Investopia.
