= Ministry of Industry and Advanced Technology (United Arab Emirates) =

Government ministry of the United Arab Emirates

- وزارة الصناعة والتكنولوجيا المتقدمة
- Logo of the UAE Ministry of Industry and Advanced Technology

Ministry overview
- Formed: 2 February 1972; 54 years ago
- Jurisdiction: Federal government of the United Arab Emirates
- Headquarters: Dubai, United Arab Emirates
- Minister responsible: Sultan Ahmed Al Jaber, Minister of Industry and Advanced Technology
- Website: moiat.gov.ae

The Ministry of Industry and Advanced Technology (MoIAT) (Arabic: وزارة الصناعة والتكنولوجيا المتقدمة) is a federal government ministry in the United Arab Emirates that is responsible for overseeing and strengthening the country's industrial sector. Established in July 2020 against the backdrop of the COVID-19 pandemic, the ministry drafts nation-wide policies, laws and programs to create industrial development framework that helps attract foreign direct investment and support national entrepreneurship as well as drive job creation.

They are responsible for the UAE Make it in the Emirates campaign.

== Main objectives ==
The Ministry's main objectives include:

- Supporting and encouraging local Emirati industries and enhancing their competitiveness
- Enhancing the UAE's position as a global destination for pioneering future industries.
- Attracting local and international industrial investments by creating an appropriate business environment.
- Providing all administrative services and facilities.
- Establishing a culture of innovation in the institutional work environment.
- Relying on advanced technology in industrial systems and solutions.
