= Emblem of the United Arab Emirates =

- Armiger: Government of the United Arab Emirates
- Adopted: 1973 (updated In 2008)
- Shield: United Arab Emirates flag and The Seven Stars of Federation of the United Arab Emirates
- Supporters: The Arab Falcon inverted and displayed
- Motto: Arabic: الإمارات العربية المتحدة ("The United Arab Emirates")

The Emblem of the UAE bearing the front cover of the Emirati Passport.

The emblem of the United Arab Emirates (شعار الإمارات العربية المتحدة) was officially adopted on 9 December 1973, and was later modified in 2008. It is similar to the coats of arms and emblems of other Arab states.

It consists of a golden falcon (Hawk of Quraish) with a disk in the middle, which shows the UAE flag and seven stars representing the seven Emirates of the federation. The falcon has 7 tail feathers also representing the 7 Emirates. The falcon holds with its talons a red parchment bearing the name of the federation in Kufic script.

Prior to March 22, 2008, when the emblem was modified, the falcon had a red disk, which showed an Arab sailboat in its interior, surrounded by a chain.

== Subnational representatives ==
The United Arab Emirates is a federation of seven emirates, each of which has its own coat of arms / wordmark logos, while some has both.

Abu Dhabi

Dubai

Sharjah

Ajman

Umm Al Quwain (coat of arms)

Umm Al Quwain (logo)

Fujairah

Ras al Khaimah

=== Wordmarks ===
Abu Dhabi

Dubai

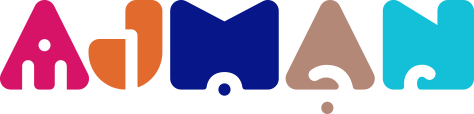
Ajman

Umm Al Quwain

== Historical emblems ==
Emblem of the Trucial States Council (1968–1971)

Emblem of United Arab Emirates (1973–2008)

== Gallery ==
Emblem of the UAE Armed Forces

Emblem of the UAE Army

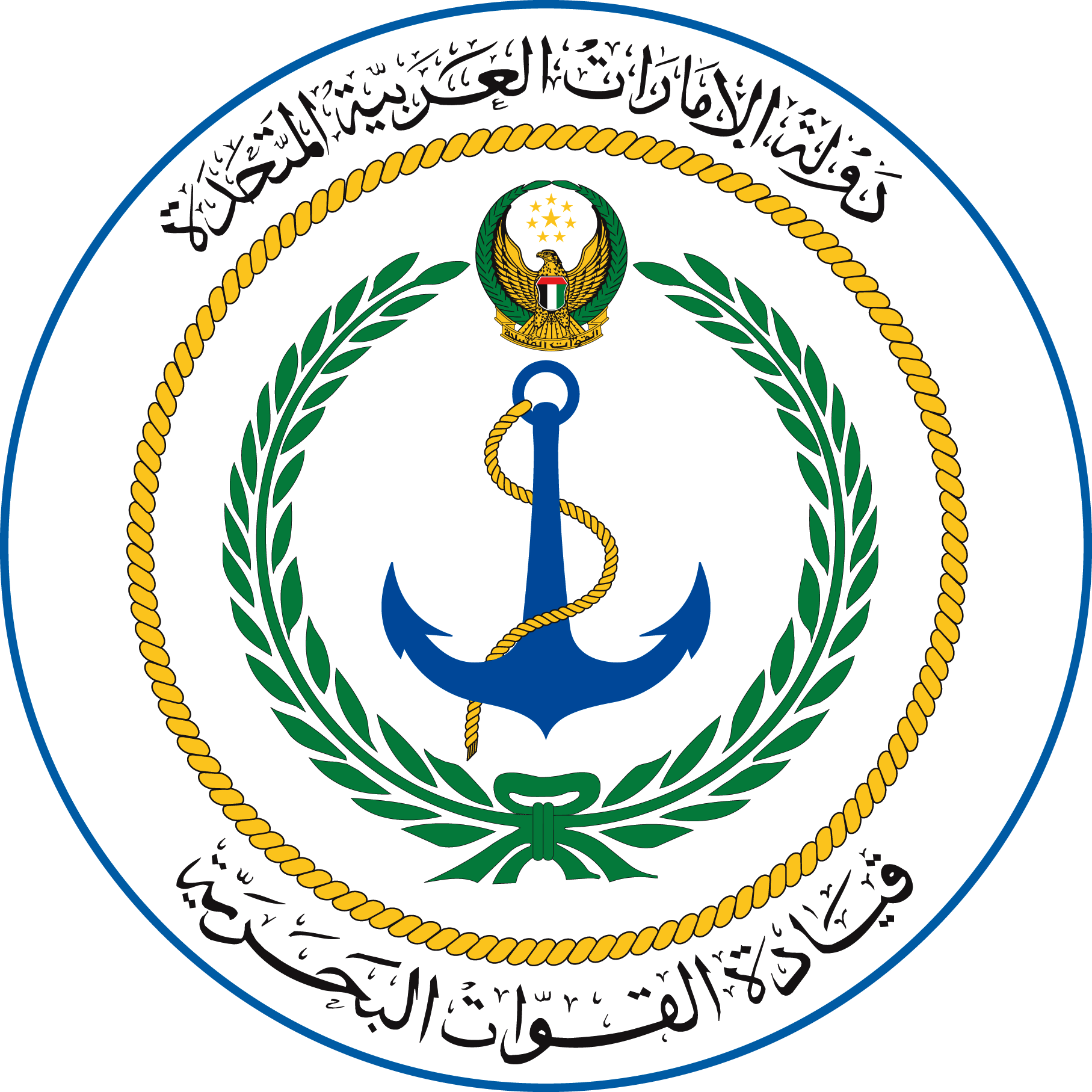
Emblem of the UAE Navy

Emblem of the UAE Air Force

Emblem of the UAE Presidential Guard

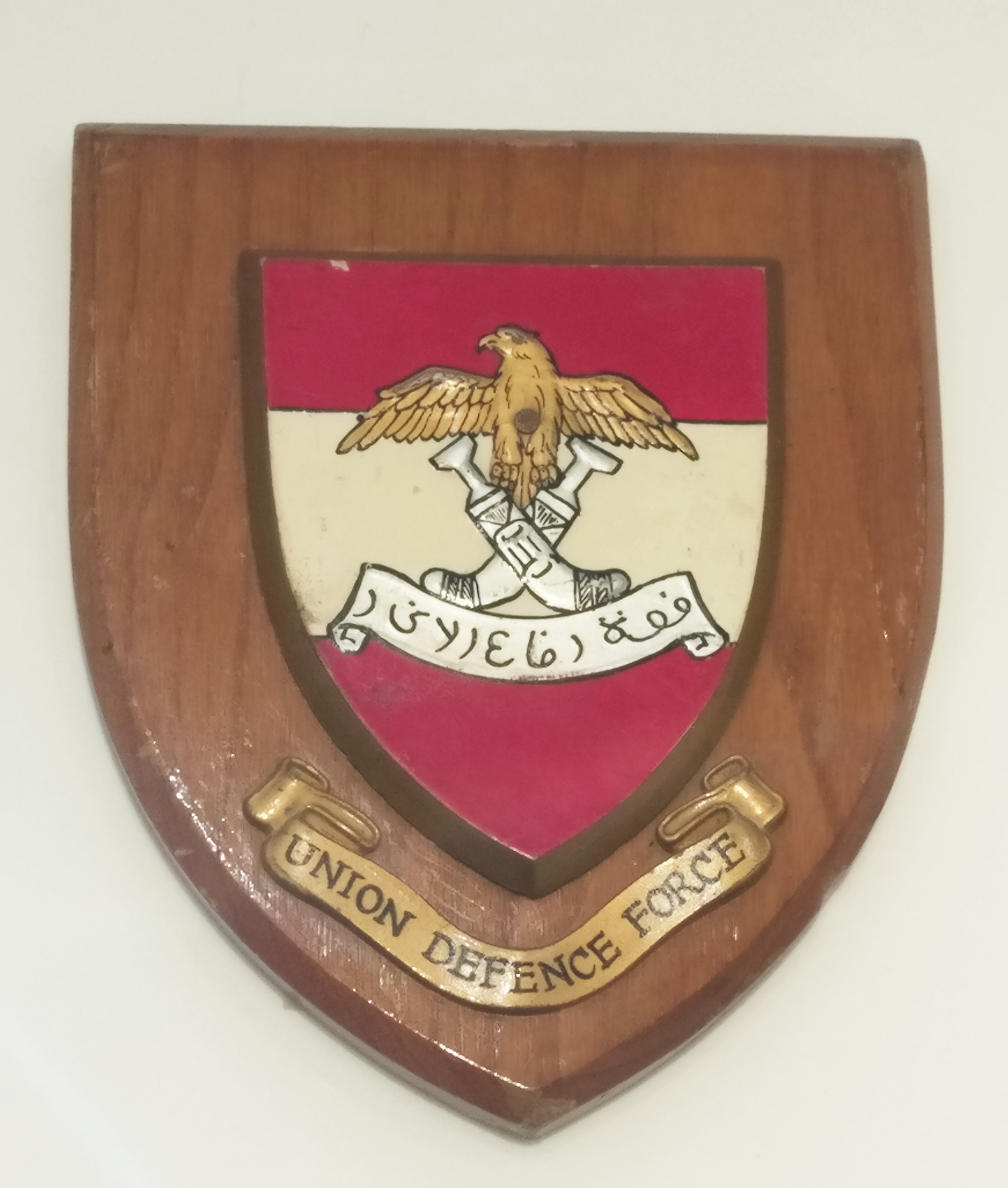
Emblem of the Trucial Oman Scouts (1951–1971)

UAE Air Force Roundel

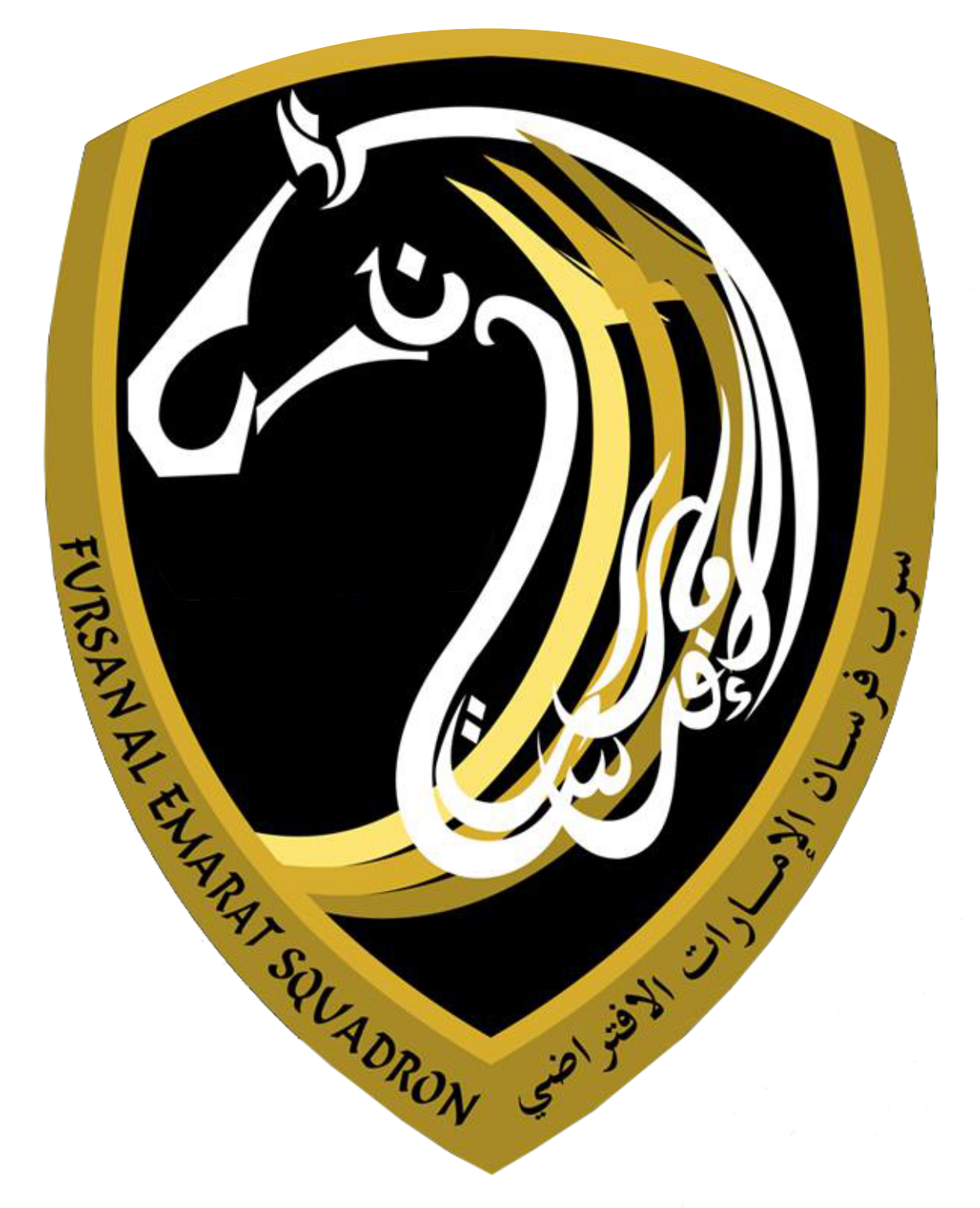
Al Fursan team shield
