= President of the United Arab Emirates =

Head of state

- رئيس دولة الإمارات العربية المتحدة
- Emblem of the United Arab Emirates

- Presidential standard

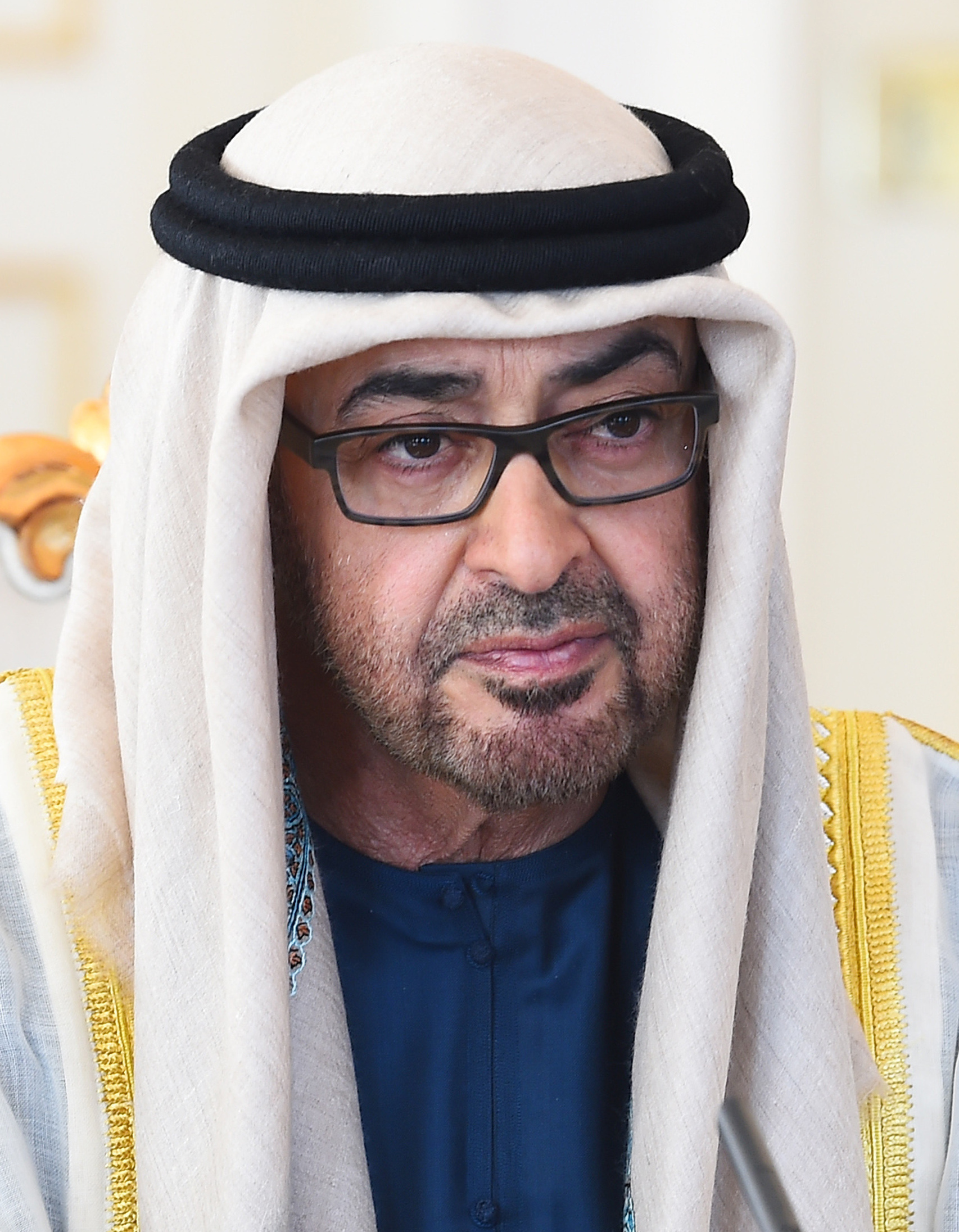
- Incumbent; Sheikh Mohamed bin Zayed Al Nahyan since 14 May 2022
- Executive branch of the Federal Government of the United Arab Emirates
- Style: His Highness
- Type: Head of state Commander-in-chief
- Member of: Federal Supreme Council
- Residence: Qasr Al Watan
- Seat: Abu Dhabi
- Appointer: Federal Supreme Council
- Term length: Five years, renewable
- Constituting instrument: Constitution of the United Arab Emirates
- Inaugural holder: Zayed bin Sultan Al Nahyan
- Formation: 2 December 1971; 54 years ago
- Deputy: Vice President
- Website: Official website

The president of the United Arab Emirates (Arabic: رئيس دولة الإمارات العربية المتحدة), or the Raʾīs (رَئِيْس), is the head of state of the United Arab Emirates (UAE).

The president and vice presidents are de jure elected every five years by the Federal Supreme Council, and the prime minister of the United Arab Emirates is de jure appointed by the president. De facto, the ruler of the Emirate of Abu Dhabi holds the presidency and the ruler of the Emirate of Dubai holds the premiership. The president is also the commander-in-chief of the UAE Armed Forces. The United Arab Emirates is the only presidential monarchy in the world.

Sheikh Zayed bin Sultan Al Nahyan was widely credited with unifying the seven emirates into one federal state. He was the UAE's first president from the formation of the UAE until his death on 2 November 2004. He was succeeded by his son, Sheikh Khalifa bin Zayed, who died in office on 13 May 2022. Following his brother Khalifa's death, Sheikh Mohamed bin Zayed Al Nahyan was elected the third and current president of the UAE by the Federal Supreme Council on 14 May 2022.

== Election and term ==
The president and vice president are elected every five years by the Federal Supreme Council (FSC) from among its members. The FSC, which is the highest constitutional body in the UAE, consists of all seven emirs. The FSC meets every five years and either reaffirms the existing president or elect a new one. The rulers of Abu Dhabi and Dubai must be among the five required votes, giving the two largest emirates an effective veto power. The term is five years according to the Gregorian calendar, and they are eligible to be re-elected for the same office. If either offices of the president or vice president become vacant due to death, resignation, or other circumstances, the FSC is required to meet within a month and elect a successor for the remainder of the term.

== Constitutional roles and powers ==
The President serves as the head of state. The president's primary role includes overseeing the execution of policy and law. The president is also the commander-in-chief of the United Arab Emirates Armed Forces. The prime minister of the United Arab Emirates is appointed by the president.

== List of officeholders (1971–present) ==
No.	Portrait	Name (Lifespan)	Term of office			Emirate	House
No.	Portrait	Name (Lifespan)	Took office	Left office	Time in office	Emirate	House
1		Zayed bin Sultan Al Nahyan زايد بن سلطان آل نهيان (1918–2004)	2 December 1971	2 November 2004 (Died in office)	32 years, 336 days	Abu Dhabi	Al Nahyan
—		Maktoum bin Rashid Al Maktoum مكتوم بن راشد آل مكتوم (1943–2006)	2 November 2004	3 November 2004	1 day	Dubai	Al Maktoum
2		Khalifa bin Zayed Al Nahyan خليفة بن زايد آل نهيان (1948–2022)	3 November 2004	13 May 2022 (Died in office)	17 years, 191 days	Abu Dhabi	Al Nahyan
—		Mohammed bin Rashid Al Maktoum محمد بن راشد آل مكتوم (born 1949)	13 May 2022	14 May 2022	1 day	Dubai	Al Maktoum
3		Mohamed bin Zayed Al Nahyan محمد بن زايد آل نهيان (born 1961)	14 May 2022	Incumbent	4 years, 129 days	Abu Dhabi	Al Nahyan

== Presidential standard ==
The presidential standard is a special version of the UAE flag reserved for the head of state. It is distinct from the original national flag and is regulated by federal protocol. This flag is exclusive to the president and cannot be raised by other federal or private entities.

Similar to the national flag, the green color is associated with growth and prosperity, white symbolizes peace and generosity, black symbolizes strength and resilience, and red with sacrifice and unity.

The emblem on the presidential standard shows a golden falcon with outstretched wings holding a parchment that had the state’s name in Arabic, with a circular shield on its chest that reproduces the UAE flag surrounded by seven stars. The falcon is a long‑standing symbol of strength and heritage in the Gulf, while the seven stars represent the seven emirates.

Presidential standard, 1973 to 2008.

Presidential standard, 2008 to present.

== See also ==
- Vice President of the United Arab Emirates
- List of prime ministers of the United Arab Emirates
