= EIBOR =

Reference rate in the United Arab Emirates

The Emirates Interbank Offered Rate (EIBOR or EBOR) is a daily reference rate, published by the UAE Central Bank, based on the averaged interest rates at which UAE banks offer to lend unsecured funds to other banks in the United Arab Emirates dirham wholesale money market (or interbank market).

== Calculation and Tenors ==
As of 29 May 2015 fixing is conducted each business day excluding Saturdays at 11AM UAE time. The fixing rate is the average of the contributions excluding the two highest and two lowest contributions for each tenor.

As of 10 December 2013 the following tenors are calculated:

- Overnight
- 1 Week
- 1 Month
- 3 Months
- 6 Months
- 12 Months

== Contributing Banks ==
As of January 2017 the following banks contribute to EIBOR:

- Abu Dhabi Commercial Bank
- Commercial Bank Of Dubai
- EmiratesNBD
- First Gulf Bank
- HSBC Bank Middle East
- MashreqBank
- National Bank Of Abu Dhabi
- National Bank Of Fujairah
- RAKBANK
- Standard Chartered Bank
- Union National Bank
- Arab Bank
