= UAE Team Emirates XRG =

Cycling team

Team information
- UCI code: UEX
- Registered: Italy (1999–2016); UAE (2017–present)
- Founded: 1999
- Discipline: Road
- Status: UCI WorldTeam
- Bicycles: Colnago
- Components: Shimano, Enve
- Website: Team home page

Key personnel
- General manager: Mauro Gianetti
- Team manager: Matxin Fernandez

Team name history
| 1999–2002 | Lampre–Daikin |
| 2003–2004 | Lampre |
| 2005 | Lampre–Caffita |
| 2006–2007 | Lampre–Fondital |
| 2008 | Lampre |
| 2009 | Lampre–NGC |
| 2010 | Lampre–Farnese Vini |
| 2011–2012 | Lampre–ISD |
| 2013–2016 | Lampre–Merida |
| 2017 | UAE Abu Dhabi |
| 2017–2024 | UAE Team Emirates |
| 2025–Present | UAE Team Emirates XRG |

UAE Team Emirates XRG (UCI team code: UEX) is an Emirati road bicycle racing team. The team competes at the UCI WorldTeam level and has done so since the UCI World Tour was formed as the top category of road cycling in 2005.

Since becoming UAE Team Emirates in 2018, the team has won the Tour de France five times and the Giro d'Italia once, with Slovenian rider Tadej Pogačar. Pogačar has also won the Monuments of Giro di Lombardia (5 times), Liège–Bastogne–Liège (4 times), Tour of Flanders (3 times), and Milan-San Remo (1 time) for the team.

The "XRG" in the current team name indicates the addition of UAE energy sponsor XRG as co-title sponsor and the official energy partner in late 2024, for a 6-year partnership.

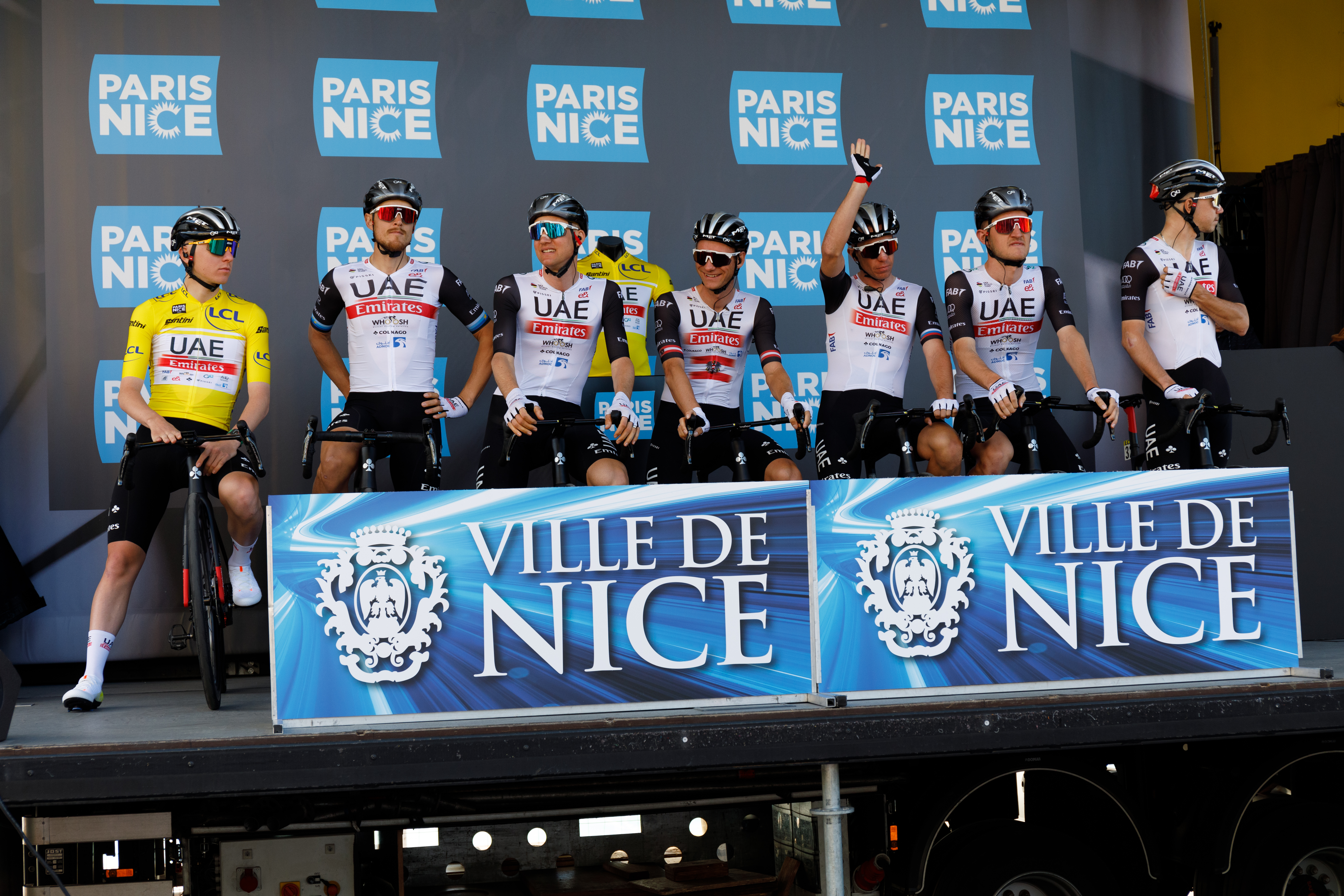
The team at the 2023 Paris–Nice

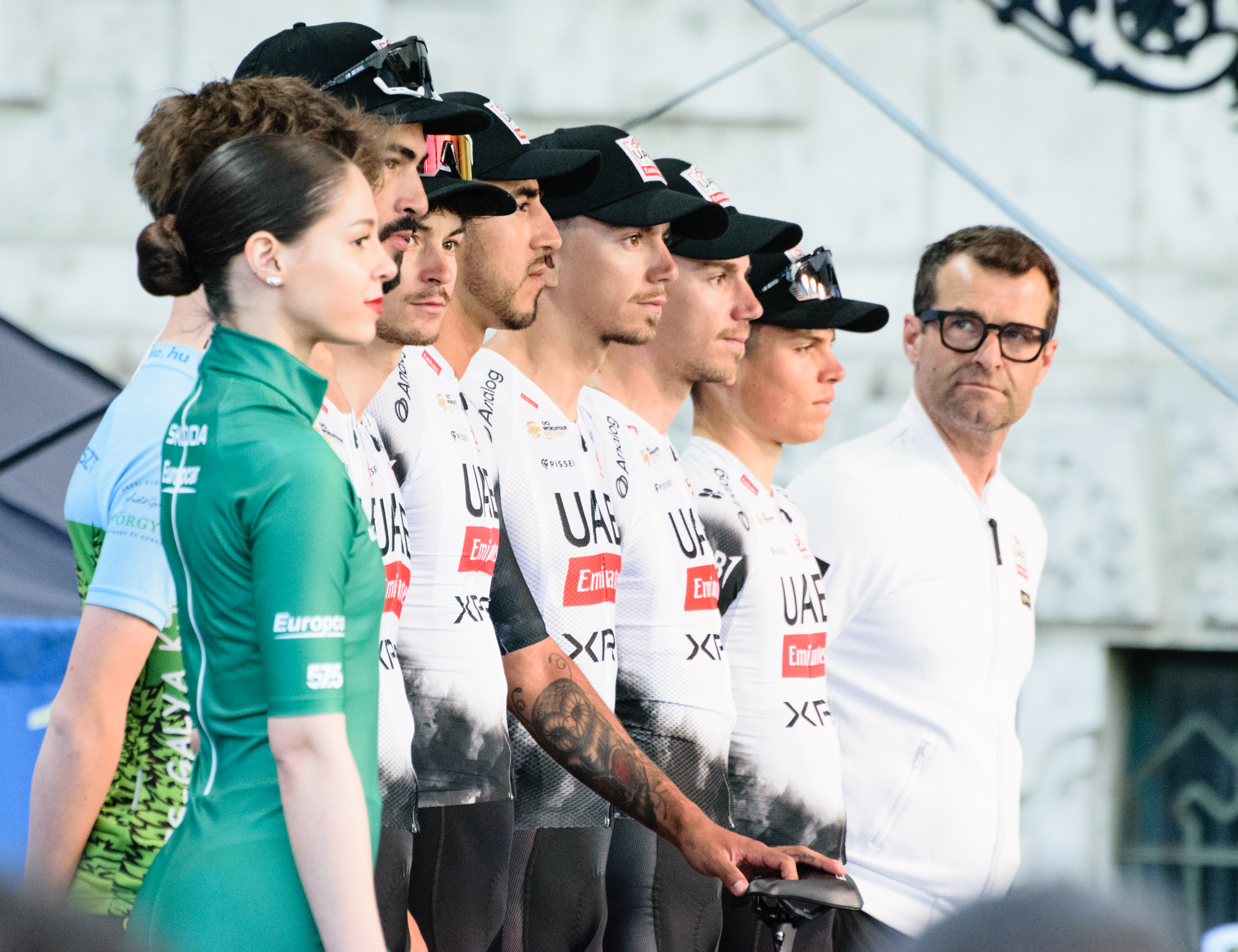
The team at the 2025 Tour de Hongrie

== History ==
The team was established in 2017 as UAE Abu Dhabi before being renamed UAE Team Emirates in 2018. It is sponsored by the UAE government and the team has achieved notable success in various prestigious races, including stage wins and overall victories in Grand Tours (the Tour de France, Giro d'Italia, and Vuelta a España) and one-day races. The team was temporarily suspended from the ProTour in 2010, missing one ProTour event.

=== Transition from an Italian-based team ===
==== Chinese involvement ====
In August 2016 the team (then called Lampre-Merida) confirmed that its WorldTeam licence was being transferred from CGS Cycling to Chinese company TJ Sport Consultation, with the team becoming the first Chinese WorldTour team from 2017. Former Saunier Duval–Prodir team manager Mauro Gianetti was announced as the co-ordinator for the project.

In an interview with La Gazzetta dello Sport the following month, Saronni confirmed that he and CGS Cycling would continue to manage the team on TJ Sport's behalf, and that the team's bicycles would be supplied by Colnago. He indicated that the project was being co-ordinated by the Chinese government via TJ Sport with involvement from a number of Chinese companies including Alibaba, and that its aim was to develop Chinese cycling and riders.

When the UCI awarded 17 WorldTour licences to teams in November, it announced that TJ Sport's application was "under review" by its Licensing Commission. According to Saronni, the reason for the delay was that the head of the TJ Sport project, Li Zhiqiang, had fallen seriously ill, which prevented funding for the project from being confirmed.

==== Emirati rescue ====
As a result, the team looked elsewhere for sponsorship, securing funding from the United Arab Emirates and changing its name to UAE Abu Dhabi. The UCI confirmed the team's WorldTour licence on 20 December. In February 2017, the team announced that airline Emirates had signed on with the team as a naming-rights sponsor. The team was subsequently known as UAE Team Emirates.

In June 2017, two days before the 2017 Tour de France the team announced it would also be sponsored by the First Abu Dhabi Bank, an amalgamation of the First Gulf Bank and the National Bank of Abu Dhabi, with their logo being added to the chest and side of the team's jersey. Additionally, in December 2024, the Abu Dhabi-based energy company XRG, a subsidiary of ADNOC, was added as a team co-title sponsor and the official energy partner, for at least a six-year term, resulting in the latest team name change.

As of April 2026, the team's main sponsors included indoor cycling software MyWhoosh, bicycle manufacturer Colnago, Swiss luxury watchmaking brand Richard Mille, Emirati artificial intelligence company G42, First Abu Dhabi Bank, Italian clothing brand Pissei, International Holding Company, sovereign wealth fund Abu Dhabi Developmental Holding Company (ADQ), telecommunications company e&.

== Kit and equipment ==
As of December 2024, Pissei produces UAE Team Emirates race clothing. For the 2026 WorldTour season, the team's bicycle framesets were Colnago-made, with Shimano groupsets, ENVE wheels, and components from Colnago, ENVE, Continental, Fizik, Elite, Wahoo, CarbonTi and Bikone.

== Team roster ==
As of 9 April 2026.

| Rider | Date of birth |
|---|---|
| João Almeida (POR) | 5 August 1998 (age 28) |
| Igor Arrieta (ESP) | 8 December 2002 (age 23) |
| Filippo Baroncini (ITA) | 26 August 2000 (age 26) |
| Mikkel Bjerg (DEN) | 3 November 1998 (age 27) |
| Jan Christen (SUI) | 26 June 2004 (age 22) |
| Benoît Cosnefroy (FRA) | 17 October 1995 (age 30) |
| Isaac del Toro (MEX) | 27 November 2003 (age 22) |
| Luca Giaimi (ITA) | 12 January 2005 (age 21) |
| Felix Großschartner (AUT) | 23 December 1993 (age 32) |
| Rune Herregodts (BEL) | 27 July 1998 (age 28) |
| Julius Johansen (DEN) | 13 September 1999 (age 27) |
| Vegard Stake Laengen (NOR) | 7 February 1989 (age 37) |
| Brandon McNulty (USA) | 2 April 1998 (age 28) |
| Juan Sebastián Molano (COL) | 4 November 1994 (age 31) |
| António Morgado (POR) | 28 January 2004 (age 22) |

| Rider | Date of birth |
|---|---|
| Jhonatan Narváez (ECU) | 4 March 1997 (age 29) |
| Domen Novak (SLO) | 12 July 1995 (age 31) |
| Ivo Oliveira (POR) | 5 September 1996 (age 30) |
| Rui Oliveira (POR) | 5 September 1996 (age 30) |
| Adrià Pericas (ESP) | 26 May 2006 (age 20) |
| Tadej Pogačar (SLO) | 21 September 1998 (age 28) |
| Nils Politt (GER) | 6 March 1994 (age 32) |
| Pavel Sivakov (FRA) | 11 July 1997 (age 29) |
| Marc Soler (ESP) | 22 November 1993 (age 32) |
| Pablo Torres (ESP) | 10 November 2005 (age 20) |
| Kevin Vermaerke (USA) | 16 October 2000 (age 25) |
| Florian Vermeersch (BEL) | 12 March 1999 (age 27) |
| Jay Vine (AUS) | 16 November 1995 (age 30) |
| Tim Wellens (BEL) | 10 May 1991 (age 35) |
| Adam Yates (GBR) | 7 August 1992 (age 34) |

== Major wins ==
Since becoming UAE Team Emirates in 2018, the team has won the Tour de France five times and the Giro d'Italia once, with Slovenian rider Tadej Pogačar. Pogačar has also won the monuments of Milan–San Remo (1 time) Giro di Lombardia (4 times), Liège–Bastogne–Liège (3 times) and Tour of Flanders (3 times) for the team.

== National, continental, and world champions ==
1999
Belgian Road Race, Ludo Dierckxsens
2000
South African Time Trial, Robbie Hunter
Latvian Time Trial, Raivis Belohvoščiks
2001
Latvian Time Trial, Raivis Belohvoščiks
2002
Latvian Time Trial, Raivis Belohvoščiks
Latvian Road Race, Raivis Belohvoščiks
2005
Austrian Road Race, Gerrit Glomser
2006
Italian Time Trial, Marzio Bruseghin
2007
Slovenian Road Race, Tadej Valjavec
2008
World Road Race, Alessandro Ballan
2011
Slovenian Road Race, Grega Bole
Ukrainian Road Race, Oleksandr Kvachuk
Ukrainian Time Trial, Oleksandr Kvachuk
Italian Time Trial, Adriano Malori
2014
Portuguese Time Trial, Nelson Oliveira
Portuguese Road Race, Nelson Oliveira
2015
Portuguese Time Trial, Nelson Oliveira
Ethiopian Road Race, Tsgabu Grmay
Ethiopian Time Trial, Tsgabu Grmay
Portuguese Road Race, Rui Costa
Slovenian Road Race, Luka Pibernik
Taiwanese Road Race, Feng Chun-kai
Taiwanese Time Trial, Feng Chun-kai
2017
UAE Time Trial, Yousif Mirza
UAE Road Race, Yousif Mirza
Slovenian Time Trial, Jan Polanc
European Track (Individual pursuit), Filippo Ganna
2018
World Track (Individual pursuit), Filippo Ganna
UAE Time Trial, Yousif Mirza
UAE Road Race, Yousif Mirza
Norwegian Road Race, Vegard Stake Laengen
2019
UAE Time Trial, Yousif Mirza
UAE Road Race, Yousif Mirza
Slovenian Time Trial, Tadej Pogačar
2020
Slovenian Time Trial, Tadej Pogačar
Portuguese Time Trial, Ivo Oliveira
Portuguese Road Race, Rui Costa
Norwegian Road Race, Sven Erik Bystrøm
European Track (Individual pursuit), Ivo Oliveira
2021
African Time Trial, Ryan Gibbons
UAE Road Race, Yousif Mirza
UAE Time Trial, Yousif Mirza
African Road Race, Ryan Gibbons
South Africa Time Trial, Ryan Gibbons
2022
UAE Road Race, Yousif Mirza
UAE Time Trial, Yousif Mirza
Swiss Time Trial, Joel Suter
Portuguese Road Race, João Almeida
2023
Australian Time Trial, Jay Vine
Slovenian Time Trial, Tadej Pogačar
Slovenian Road Race, Tadej Pogačar
American Time Trial, Brandon McNulty
Portuguese Time Trial, João Almeida
Swiss Road Race, Marc Hirschi
2024
World Road Race Championships, Tadej Pogačar
American Time Trial, Brandon McNulty
Austrian Time Trial, Felix Großschartner
Belgian Time Trial, Tim Wellens
German Time Trial, Nils Politt
Portuguese Time Trial, António Morgado
Slovenian Road Race, Domen Novak
2025
World Road Race Championships, Tadej Pogačar
European Road Race Championships, Tadej Pogačar
Austrian Time Trial, Felix Großschartner
Belgian Road Race, Tim Wellens
Ecuador Road Race, Jhonatan Narváez

Polish Road Race, Rafał Majka
Portuguese Road Race, Ivo Oliveira
Portuguese Time Trial, António Morgado
Mexican Time Trial, Isaac del Toro
Mexican Road Race, Isaac del Toro
