= Khaled Mohamed Balama =

Governor of the Central Bank of the United Arab Emirates

- خالد محمد بالعمى التميمي

Governor of the Central Bank of the United Arab Emirates
- Incumbent
- Assumed office 5 April 2021
- President: Khalifa bin Zayed Al Nahyan; Mohammed bin Zayed Al Nahyan
- Preceded by: Abdulhamid M. Saeed

Personal details
- Born: United Arab Emirates
- Education: Indiana University School of Business (BS)

Khaled Mohammed Salem Balama Al Tameemi is the current governor of the Central Bank of the United Arab Emirates (CBUAE). He has over 30 years of experience in the fields of banking, financial services, asset management, and investments.

Balama was born in the United Arab Emirates and studied finance at Indiana University School of Business (now Kelley School of Business), where he received a Bachelor of Science degree in 1990. He has been a Chartered Financial Analyst (CFA) since 1995. He has held various senior positions at the Abu Dhabi Investment Authority, including executive director of the Real Assets Department.

Balama was appointed governor of CBUAE on 5 April 2021. As governor, he is responsible for overseeing the functions of ensuring the UAE's monetary and financial stability. He has overseen several initiatives, including the Targeted Economic Support Scheme (TESS). In September 2021, CBUAE issued new guidance to help financial institutions combat money laundering and terrorism financing. In December 2021, the bank developed an enhanced framework to supervise the exposure of the banks to the real estate sector.
