= AED symbol =

AED symbol may refer to:

- The Emirati dirham sign, the official currency symbol for the United Arab Emirates dirham (AED)
- The symbol signifying an automated external defibrillator (AED), a portable medical device used to treat cardiac arrhythmias
