= Targeted Economic Support Scheme =

UAE economic stimulus package

The Targeted Economic Support Scheme (TESS) is a stimulus package launched by the Central Bank of the United Arab Emirates in March 2020 in response to the economic impacts of the COVID-19 pandemic. The TESS consisted of 50 billion United Arab Emirates dirham in funding from the bank and 50 billion freed up from the capital buffers of the banks, which were used to provide collateralized loans at zero cost to participating banks. These loans were used to grant temporary relief to eligible customers for a period of up to six months.

In December 2020, the central bank announced that it would extend the validity of key components of the TESS until June 30, 2021. This extension allowed banks and finance companies participating in the TESS to provide new loans and facilities to customers affected by the pandemic starting on January 1, 2021. As of December 2020, the TESS loan deferral program had already benefited over 310,000 retail customers, nearly 10,000 small and medium-sized enterprises, and more than 1,500 private sector companies.

In October 2021, Abdul Aziz Al Ghurair, the chairman of the UAE Banks Federation, announced that the TESS was no longer necessary. Al Ghurair stated that 95% of banks had already surrendered their TESS quotas, and that the banking sector had taken sufficient precautions to ensure that customers were able to meet their credit commitments. The loan repayment deferral component of TESS ended on December 31, 2021, marking the first phase of the regulator's plan to gradually end the measures implemented during the pandemic. However, the TESS program continued to support new lending and financing until June 30, 2022.
