= Khalifa Bin Yousef =

Emirati politician

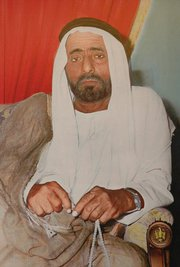
- Born: Khalifa Bin Yousef Bin Ahmed Bin Obaid Bin Ahmed Bin Abdullah Al Suwaidi; July 2, 1905; United Arab Emirates
- Died: August 13, 1971 (aged 66); United Arab Emirates
- Occupations: Merchant and Political Advisor to the Ruler of the UAE and Mayor of Abu Dhabi
- Website: http://www.khalifabinyousef.ae/

Khalifa Bin Yousef, also Khalifa Bin Yousef Al Suwaidi, was a statesman who played a significant role in the unification of The United Arab Emirates and in the economic and political life of the time in the Persian Gulf.

== Early life ==
Born in 1905 in Abu Dhabi, Khalifa Bin Yousef was the eldest to his father, Yousef bin Ahmed bin Obaid Al Suwaidi. In the beginning of the 20th century, there was no direct trade lines between Abu Dhabi and India, and Abu Dhabi's imports and exports went through Bahrain. Khalifa took over the family business that was established on a single Arabian Dhow, importing rice, sugar, spices, and basic products and consumables.

== Business ==
When the pearling era in Abu Dhabi came to an end, Khalifa Bin Yousef looked for new direction for his business. Soon he was representing major industries like BP, Rothmans, Philips, Rainbow Milk, Palmolive, Vauxhall Motors and Bedford Vehicles.

In 1953, D'Arcy Exploration Company, the exploration arm of BP, obtained an offshore concession which was then transferred to a company created to operate it, titled Abu Dhabi Marine Areas (ADMA), and was a joint venture between BP and Compagnie Française des Pétroles (later, Total). Using a marine drilling platform, the ADMA Enterprise struck oil in the Umm Shaif field in 1958. The Murban field followed in 1960, then Bu Hasa in 1962 and the Zakum offshore field in 1965.

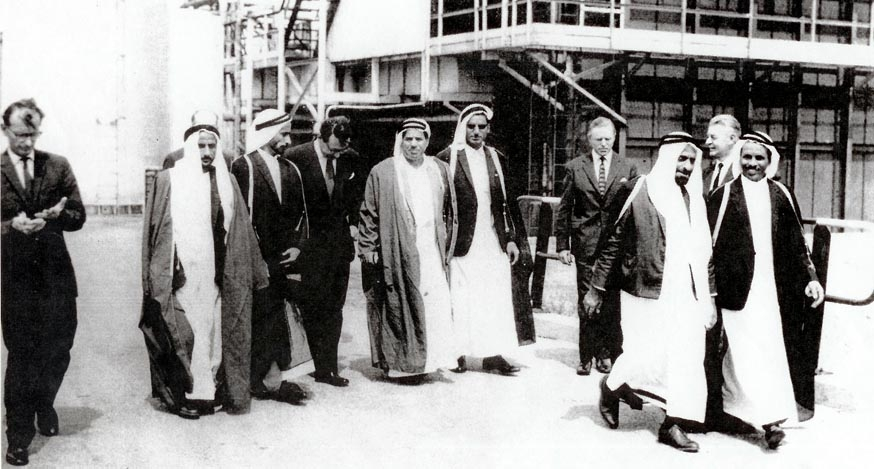
Khalifa Bin Yousef Leaving London

== Influence on economy ==
Some of Khalifa Bin Yousef's projects and contributions remain today as major institutions in the United Arab Emirates. He helped establish and lead The National Bank of Abu Dhabi, Abu Dhabi Chamber of Commerce, and Abu Dhabi Television company. He was also a board member in the committee responsible for investment of government funds, today known as Abu Dhabi Investment Authority.

In 1968, National Bank of Abu Dhabi was established. It was the number one bank in Abu Dhabi, the first and only commercial bank, and the first National bank as well. Khalifa Bin Yousef suggested to Sheikh Zayed Bin Sultan Al Nahyan, the Ruler of Abu Dhabi at that time, to establish the bank: "Instead of investing in foreign banks, Abu Dhabi should have its own bank for its own people". The establishment of National Bank of Abu Dhabi was made by Khalifa bin Yousef, and was chaired by him until he died in 1971.

In August 1969, The Ruler of Abu Dhabi permitted Khalifa bin Yousef to establish Abu Dhabi Television Company. In September of the same year, he was one of those who drove the effort to establish Abu Dhabi's Chamber of Commerce and & Industry, becoming also a board member.

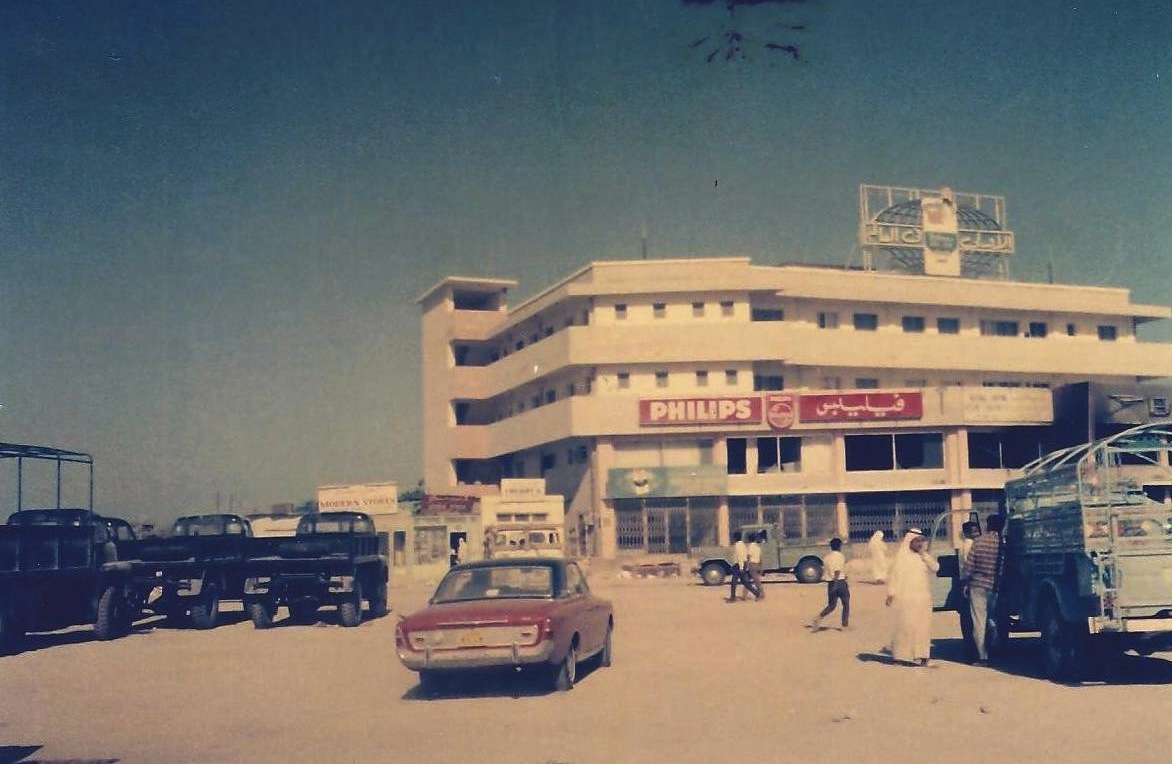
The first commercial building in Abu Dhabi

== Political role ==
During the reign of ruler of Abu Dhabi Shakhbut bin Sultan Al Nahyan, Khalifa Bin Yousef was his political adviser, headed the Ruler's Office, and was The Ruler's Secretary Cum General aide. These positions allowed him to play a direct role in the politics of the region and of the budding Oil Industry. He managed the foreign relations and was responsible for the negotiations held with some of the oil companies working in the country today.

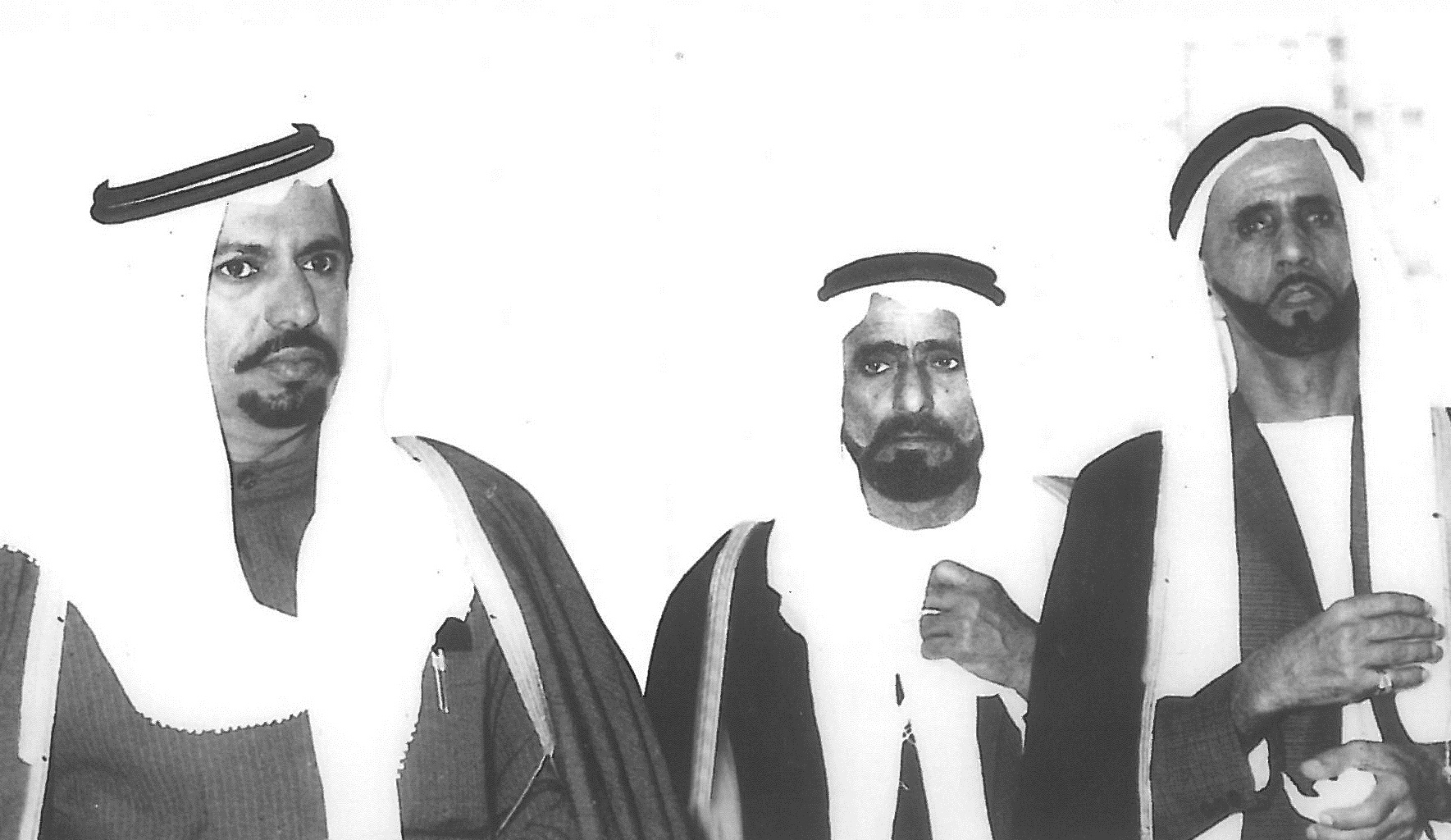
Sheik Hamdan Al Nahyan, Khalifa Bin Yousef and Thani Bin Murshid

When Zayed Bin Sultan Al Nahyan became the ruler of Abu Dhabi in 1966, and subsequently unified the seven Emirates into one country in 1971, Khalifa Bin Yousef played a central role in the architecture and diplomacy that led to the unification and the creation of The United Arab Emirates.

Khalifa Bin Yousef also held the role as the Ruler of Abu Dhabi special envoy to the trucial states council between 1967 and 1971.

== Domestic affairs ==
In 1969, Khalifa Bin Yousef became vice-president of the municipal council at the municipality of Abu Dhabi. Before dying in 1971, he was appointed vice chairman and undersecretary of the Ministry of Municipalities & Agriculture, and was known as the last mayor of Abu Dhabi.

Khalifa Bin Yousef was constantly involved in decision making and had a big influence during these times. He held many positions and was the founder and head of the Ruler's Diwan of Abu Dhabi and its dependencies in Qasr Al Hosn.

== Final years ==
Khalifa Bin Yousef died at his house in Abu Dhabi on the afternoon of August 13, 1971. Sheikh Zayed bin Sultan Al Nahyan, Ruler of Abu Dhabi, accepted condolences at the central Majlis of Al Manhal Presidential Palace in Abu Dhabi. Sheikh Zayed expressed his loss with grief by stating: "I have just lost my right-hand man today".

== Marriage and children ==
Khalifa bin Yousef married four times. his wives are as follows:

- Mariam Bint Ahmed Khalifa Bin Ahmed Al Suwaidi
- Hamda Bint Bint Abdullah Bin Saeed Al Qumzi
- Afra Bint Mohamed Al Masoud Al Muheirbi
- Meera Bint Saeed Bin Hafeed Al Mazrouei

He had 11 children in total, 6 daughters and 6 sons, and they are as follows:

=== Sons ===
- Ahmed I Bin Khalifa bin Yousef Al Suwaidi
- Mohamed Bin Khalifa bin Yousef Al Suwaidi
- Yousef Bin Khalifa bin Yousef Al Suwaidi
- Ahmed II Bin Khalifa bin Yousef Al Suwaidi
- Abdullah Bin Khalifa bin Yousef Al Suwaidi
- Tareq Bin Khalifa bin Yousef Al Suwaidi

=== Daughters ===
- Mouza Bint Khalifa bin Yousef Al Suwaidi
- Shamsa Bint Khalifa bin Yousef Al Suwaidi
- Aisha Bint Khalifa bin Yousef Al Suwaidi
- Mariam Bint Khalifa bin Yousef Al Suwaidi
- Amna Bint Khalifa bin Yousef Al Suwaidi
- Nahla Bint Khalifa bin Yousef Al Suwaidi
