= Commemorative coins of the United Arab Emirates =

Since 1900s, the Central Bank of the United Arab Emirates has minted several commemorative coins. These coins celebrate events, personalities, and rulers of the UAE.

United Arab Emirates Commemorative Coins
Year	Description	AED	Alloy	Diameter	Weight	Fineness	KM#
1976	5th UAE National Day (Minted by Currency Board)	1000	gold	40 mm	40 g	.9167	#13
1981	15th Hijra Century	5	Cu/Ni	32 mm	14.25 g	n/a	#9
1986	27th Chess Olympiad in Dubai	1	Cu/Ni	28.5 mm	11.31 g	n/a	#10
1987	25th anniversary of the first offshore oil shipment from Abu Dhabi	1	Cu/Ni	28.5 mm	11.31 g	n/a	#11
1987	10th anniversary of UAE University	1	Cu/Ni	28.5 mm	11.31 g	n/a	#14
1990	Qualification of the UAE national football team to 1990 FIFA World Cup	1	Cu/Ni	28.5 mm	11.31 g	n/a	#15
1992	Commemoration of the late Sheikh Rashid bin Saeed Al Maktoum	50	silver	40 mm	40 g	.9250	#17
1992	Commemoration of the late Sheikh Rashid bin Saeed Al Maktoum	500	gold	25 mm	20 g	.9167	#23
1992	Commemoration of the late Sheikh Rashid bin Saeed Al Maktoum	1000	gold	40 mm	40 g	.9167	#26
1992	10th anniversary of the Central Bank of the UAE	50	silver	40 mm	40 g	.9250	#18
1992	10th anniversary of the Central Bank of the UAE	500	gold	25 mm	20 g	.9167	#24
1992	10th anniversary of the Central Bank of the UAE	1000	gold	40 mm	40 g	.9167	#27
1995	20th anniversary of the General Women's Union	1000	gold	40 mm	40 g	.9167	#28
1995	20th anniversary of the General Women's Union	500	gold	25 mm	20 g	.9167	#25
1995	50th anniversary of the Arab League	50	silver	40 mm	40 g	.9250	#19
1996	30th anniversary of the reign of Sheikh Zayed bin Sultan Al Nahyan	n/a	gold	65 mm	200 g	.9167	-
1996	30th anniversary of the reign of Sheikh Zayed bin Sultan Al Nahyan	1000	gold	40 mm	40 g	.9167	#30
1996	30th anniversary of the reign of Sheikh Zayed bin Sultan Al Nahyan	50	silver	40 mm	40 g	.9250	#22
1996	25th UAE National Day	n/a	gold	65 mm	200 g	.9167	-
1996	25th UAE National Day	1000	gold	40 mm	40 g	.9167	#29
1996	25th UAE National Day	50	silver	40 mm	40 g	.9250	#21
1998	35th anniversary of National Bank of Dubai	1	Cu/Ni	24 mm	6.4 g	n/a	#32
1998	35th anniversary of National Bank of Dubai	25	silver	28 mm	20 g	.9250	#33
1998	35th anniversary of National Bank of Dubai	50	silver	40 mm	40 g	.9250	#34
1998	10th anniversary of the Higher Colleges of Technology	1	Cu/Ni	24 mm	6.4 g	n/a	#35
1998	10th anniversary of the Higher Colleges of Technology	50	silver	40 mm	40 g	.9250	#36
1998	50th anniversary of UNICEF	50	silver	40 mm	27.22 g	.9250	#37
1998	Sharjah the cultural capital of the Arab world	50	silver	40 mm	40 g	.9250	-
1998	Sharjah the cultural capital of the Arab world	1	Cu/Ni	24 mm	6.4 g	n/a	#39
1998	Sheikha Fatima Bint Mubarak, humanitarian personality of 1998	n/a	gold	40 mm	40 g	.9167	-
1998	Sheikha Fatima Bint Mubarak, humanitarian personality of 1998	n/a	gold	28 mm	20 g	.9167	-
1999	25th anniversary of the first oil shipment from Abu Al Bukhoosh oil field in Abu Dhabi	25	silver	28 mm	20 g	.9250	-
1999	30th anniversary of Abu Dhabi Chamber of Commerce & Industry	50	silver	40 mm	40 g	.9250	-
1999	100th anniversary of Dubai Ports & Customs Department	100	silver	40 mm	40 g	.9250	-
1999	Sheikh Zayed bin Sultan Al Nahyan, Islamic personality of the Year	n/a	gold	40 mm	40 g	.9167	-
1999	Sheikh Zayed bin Sultan Al Nahyan, Islamic personality of the Year	50	silver	40 mm	40 g	.9250	#42
1999	Sheikh Zayed bin Sultan Al Nahyan Islamic personality of the Year	1	Cu/Ni	24 mm	6.4 g	n/a	#41
1999	Ministry of Finance & Industry ISO-9001 certification	50	silver	40 mm	40 g	.9250	-
2000	25th anniversary of Dubai Islamic Bank	1	Cu/Ni	24 mm	6.4 g	n/a	#43
2000	25th anniversary of Dubai Islamic Bank	25	silver	28 mm	20 g	.9250	#44
2000	25th anniversary of Dubai Islamic Bank	50	silver	40 mm	40 g	.9250	#45
2000	25th anniversary of the General Women's Union	50	silver	40 mm	40 g	.9250	-
2000	25th anniversary of the General Women's Union	1	Cu/Ni	24 mm	6.4 g	n/a	#46
2000	25th anniversary of the Arab Bank for Investment and Foreign Trade	50	silver	40 mm	40 g	.9250	-
2000	Inauguration of Sheikh Rashid's Terminal at Dubai International Airport	50	silver	40 mm	40 g	.9250	#48
2001	25th anniversary of the unification of the UAE Armed Forces	50	silver	40 mm	40 g	.9250	-
2001	25th anniversary of the unification of the UAE Armed Forces	1	Cu/Ni	24 mm	6.4 g	n/a	-
2001	30th anniversary of Al Ain National Museum	50	silver	40 mm	40 g	.9250	-
2001	20th anniversary of the Administrative Development Institute	50	silver	40 mm	40 g	.9250	-
2002	25th anniversary of UAE University	50	silver	40 mm	40 g	.9250	-
2002	Sheikh Hamdan Bin Rashid Al Maktoum Award for Medical Sciences	50	silver	40 mm	40 g	.9250	-
2002	Ahmadia School in Dubai	50	silver	40 mm	40 g	.9250	-
2003	30th anniversary of Central Bank of the UAE	n/a	gold	40 mm	40 g	.9167	-
2003	30th anniversary of Central Bank of the UAE	50	silver	40 mm	40 g	.9250	-
2003	World Bank-IMF Annual Meetings in Dubai	n/a	gold	40 mm	40 g	.9167	-
2003	World Bank-IMF Annual Meetings in Dubai	50	silver	40 mm	40 g	.9250	-
2003	World Bank-IMF Annual Meetings in Dubai	1	Cu/Ni	24 mm	6.4 g	n/a	-
2007	30th anniversary of the establishment of the Zakum Development Company (ZADCO)	1	Cu/Ni	24 mm	6.4 g	n/a	-
2012	50th anniversary of the First Oil Shipment from the UAE	1	Cu/Ni	29 mm	6.4 g	n/a	-
2022	30th anniversary of the Tawazuun Economic Council	30	silver	40 mm	40 g	n/a	
2022	50th anniversary of the UAE Football Association	n/a	silver	40 mm	40 g	n/a	
2026	Emirati Children's Day	15	silver	38 mm	28 g	0.999	
