= First Abu Dhabi Bank =

Emirati bank

- Native name: بنك أبوظبي الأول
- Type: Public bank
- Traded as: ADX: FAB
- ISIN: AEN000101016
- Industry: Banking
- Founded: April 2017; 9 years ago
- Headquarters: Abu Dhabi, United Arab Emirates
- Number of locations: 140 (2025)
- Key people: Hana Al Rostamani; Group CEO; Sheikh Tahnoun bin Zayed Al Nahyan (Chairman)
- Revenue: AED 21.11 billion (US$5.75 billion) (2025)
- Operating income: AED 36.68 billion (US$9.99 billion) (2025)
- Total assets: AED 1.4 trillion (US$381.47 billion) (2025)
- Owner: Abu Dhabi Investment Council Company (33.3%)
- Number of employees: 7 500 (2025)
- Website: www.bankfab.com/en-ae/personal

First Abu Dhabi Bank (FAB) (Arabic: بنك أبوظبي الأول) is the largest bank in the United Arab Emirates. Headquartered in Abu Dhabi, it was formed in 2017 through the merger of First Gulf Bank (FGB) and National Bank of Abu Dhabi (NBAD).

First Abu Dhabi Bank operates in 20 markets across five continents through its investment banking, wholesale banking, personal banking, business banking, wealth management and privileged client businesses.

== History ==
First Abu Dhabi Bank was formed as a result of a merger between FGB and NBAD. In July 2016, the two banks announced the transaction, in December of the same year shareholders approved it, and the merger was completed in April 2017. The transaction was executed through a share swap, with FGB shareholders receiving 1.254 NBAD shares for each FGB share they held. The merger led to the creation of the UAE’s largest bank.

The launch of FAB’s new brand identity combined the ‘Abu Dhabi’ and ‘First’ identities from NBAD and FGB, the First Abu Dhabi Bank (FAB) name reflects the two banks’ roots in the region. The bank adopted the acronym F.A.B in its logo, which also features the “Awwal” (First) brand mark, enlarged to represent growth and leadership.

Following its formation in 2017, First Abu Dhabi Bank expanded its operations in international markets. By 2023, the bank was present in 20 markets across the Middle East and North Africa, Europe, the United States and Asia.

In 2019, Qatar filed suits against three banks it accused of involvement in a 2017 scheme to devalue the Qatari riyal. Suits against two banks, First Abu Dhabi Bank and Saudi Arabia’s Samba Bank were filed in New York, while the suit against the private bank, Banque Havilland, was filed in London. FAB denied the allegations, and Qatar discontinued its case against the bank in 2022.

In 2023, the Financial Conduct Authority fined Banque Havilland £10 million for its involvement in the plans, which were also forwarded to an Abu Dhabi sovereign wealth fund official.

In January 2021, Hana Al Rostamani has been appointed as group chief executive officer, becoming the first woman to lead one of the UAE's largest banks. At the end of 2021, сompany’s net profits were US$3.4 billion, 19 percent up from than previous year.

In April 2025, FAB, Abu Dhabi sovereign wealth fund ADQ, and International Holding Company (IHC) announced launch a Dirham-backed stablecoin.

In August 2025, that FAB had moved into a new branch location in London, specifically 20 Berkeley Square in Mayfair. FAB was the first Gulf-based bank to operate in the United Kingdom in 1977, back when it was National Bank of Abu Dhabi.

In December 2025, FAB signed a Memorandum of Understanding (MoU) with European asset management company Amundi to boost its investment management offerings across the Gulf Cooperation Council (GCC).

In January 2026, FAB announced a strategic partnership with global asset management firm T. Rowe Price to enhance investments offering across the GCC.

For the 2025 financial year, FAB reported a record Group net profit of AED 21.11 billion (US$5.75 billion), up 24 percent year-on-year, on operating income of AED 36.68 billion and total assets of AED 1.40 trillion. For the first half of 2026, FAB reported net profit of AED 10.73 billion, up 1 percent year-on-year, as operating income rose 7 percent to AED 19.50 billion.

== International operations ==
FAB operates outside the United Arab Emirates through branches, subsidiaries and representative offices across the Middle East, Europe, Asia-Pacific and the Americas. As of 2025, the bank had a presence in 20 markets.

In Europe, FAB operates in the United Kingdom, France and Switzerland. Its London operations date to 1977, when its predecessor, National Bank of Abu Dhabi, opened a branch in the United Kingdom. The bank also maintains operations in Paris and Geneva, where FAB Private Bank (Suisse) SA provides wealth management services.

In the Americas, FAB operates in the United States and Brazil. In Asia-Pacific, it operates in Singapore, Hong Kong, India, South Korea, Indonesia and Malaysia.

Elsewhere in the Middle East, FAB operates in Bahrain, Saudi Arabia, Oman, Kuwait and Egypt, providing corporate, investment, commercial and private banking services through branches and subsidiaries. Its Egyptian subsidiary, FABMISR, is one of the larger foreign-owned banks in Egypt.

== Recognitions ==
FAB has been ranked by Global Finance as the safest bank in the UAE and the Middle East and the best bank in the UAE.

The Banker’s Top 1000 World Banks 2020 list, measured by Tier 1 capital, ranked FAB as number one in the UAE, second in the Middle East and 85th across the globe – in addition to ranking the bank #109 by assets in the same list.

FAB was also ranked first in the UAE, 4th in the Arab world and 303rd globally in Forbes annual ranking of the world’s 2000 largest public companies.

FAB was ranked third on Forbes Middle East's 30 Most Valuable Banks 2025 list. It also ranked seventh of Forbes Middle East's Top 100 Listed Companies 2025 list.

In The Banker's 2026 ranking, First Abu Dhabi Bank ranked first in operational efficiency among UAE banks. In Forbes' 2026 Global 2000, it ranked 237th globally and highest among UAE companies, while Forbes Middle East ranked it third among the region's most valuable banks in 2025.

In 2026, FAB received recognition from several industry organisations, including Global Finance, MEED and The Digital Banker. In the 2026 Evident AI Index for Banks – Middle East and Africa, which assessed 25 banks across the region, FAB ranked first in the Leadership and Transparency pillars and third overall.
