= NBAD Private Bank (Suisse) SA =

- Industry: Private banking and Trade Finance
- Founded: 2007 in Geneva
- Headquarters: Geneva, Switzerland
- Products: Wealth Management and Trade Finance
- Website: http://www.nbadsuisse.ch

NBAD Private Bank (Suisse) SA is a Swiss private bank located in the heart of Geneva. It provides private banking services for private clients. It is an independent and wholly owned subsidiary of the National Bank of Abu Dhabi Group (NBAD Group).

== The National Bank of Abu Dhabi ==
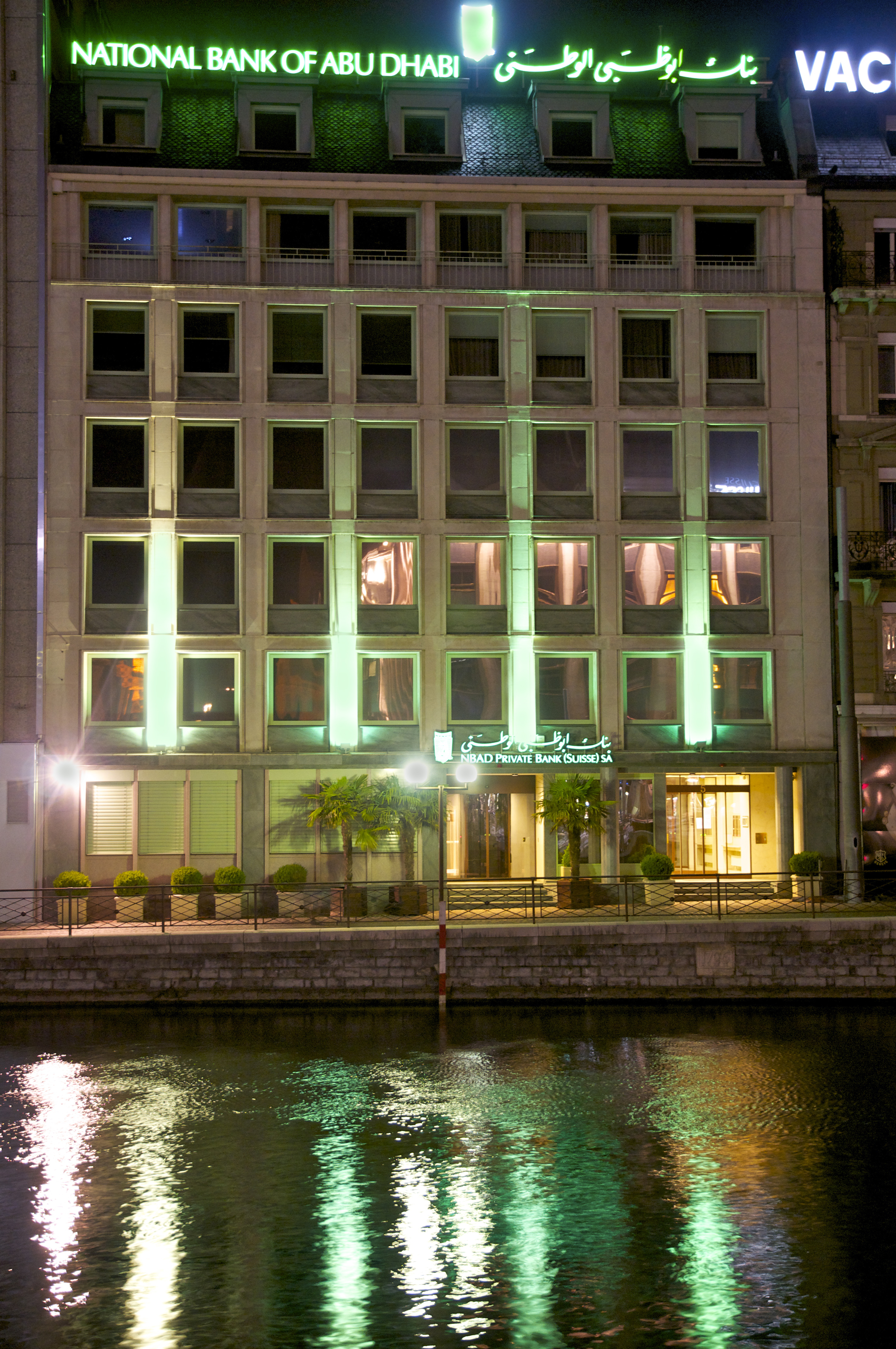
NBAD Private Bank (Suisse) SA building Geneva

The National Bank of Abu Dhabi (NBAD) was incorporated in 1968 and is listed in the Abu Dhabi Securities Exchange (ADX), under stock code NBAD. It has one of the largest networks in the UAE, and its international network includes all areas of the world.

Since 2009, the bank has been ranked each year one of the World’s 50 Safest Banks by Global Finance magazine, the safest bank in the Middle East. It was also named in 2011 the Best Bank in the UAE for the third consecutive year and for the fifth time in a decade by Euromoney and in 2012 the Best Private Bank in the UAE by the Banker. NBAD surpassed the US$1 billion net profits in 2010, becoming the first UAE bank to reach this milestone.

NBAD is rated senior long term/short term AA− by Standard & Poor's (S&P), Aa3/P1 by Moody’s, AA-/F1+ by Fitch and A+ by Rating and Investment Information Inc (R&I) and AAA by RAM (Malaysia), giving it one of the strongest combined rating of any Middle Eastern financial institution. A comprehensive financial institution, NBAD offers a range of banking services including retail, investment and Islamic banking services.

== Key dates ==
- 2007: Launch of the Bank and its private banking services.
- 2008: Launch of trade finance operations.
- 2009: Acquisition of its Quai de l'Ile building.
- 2013: NBAD Private Bank (Suisse) SA increases its capital from CHF 40 million to CHF 140 million, therefore strengthening its funding capacity.

== Financial services and products ==
NBAD Private Bank (Suisse) SA offers financial services in wealth management.

The bank offers specialised counselling in the bonds and equities markets of the Gulf Cooperation Council (Saudi Arabia, Abu Dhabi, Bahrain, Kuwait, Qatar, Oman).
