= Emirati dirham sign =

Currency symbol of the United Arab Emirates

Emirati dirham sign
- In Unicode: U+20C3 ⃃ UAE DIRHAM SIGN

Currency
- Currency: Emirati dirham

The Emirati dirham sign is the official currency symbol used for the Emirati dirham, the official currency of the United Arab Emirates. The design was presented to the public by the Central Bank of the United Arab Emirates (CBUAE) on 27 March 2025. It is based on the Latin letter D, crossed by two lines. The symbol should precede the value, e.g., 10.

The Emirati dirham symbol.

On 27 March 2025, the Central Bank of the United Arab Emirates, unveiled the symbol, with the aim to establish the Emirati dirham as an international currency and to strengthen UAE's position as a global financial hub.

The United Arab Emirates is the second Arab country to adopt an official currency symbol, after the Saudi riyal.

== Usage and implementation ==
The Central Bank of the United Arab Emirates released a guideline for the Emirati dirham symbol, detailing the dos and the don'ts, use cases, etc.

The symbol was accepted and encoded as U+20C3, in Unicode version 18.0, which was released in September 2026. The Central Bank Plans to replace the (^) symbol on the number 6 key on all keyboards with the Emirati dirham symbol.

As of April 2026, several stores and apps/websites already use the new symbol.
