= Sultan bin Nasser al-Suwaidi =

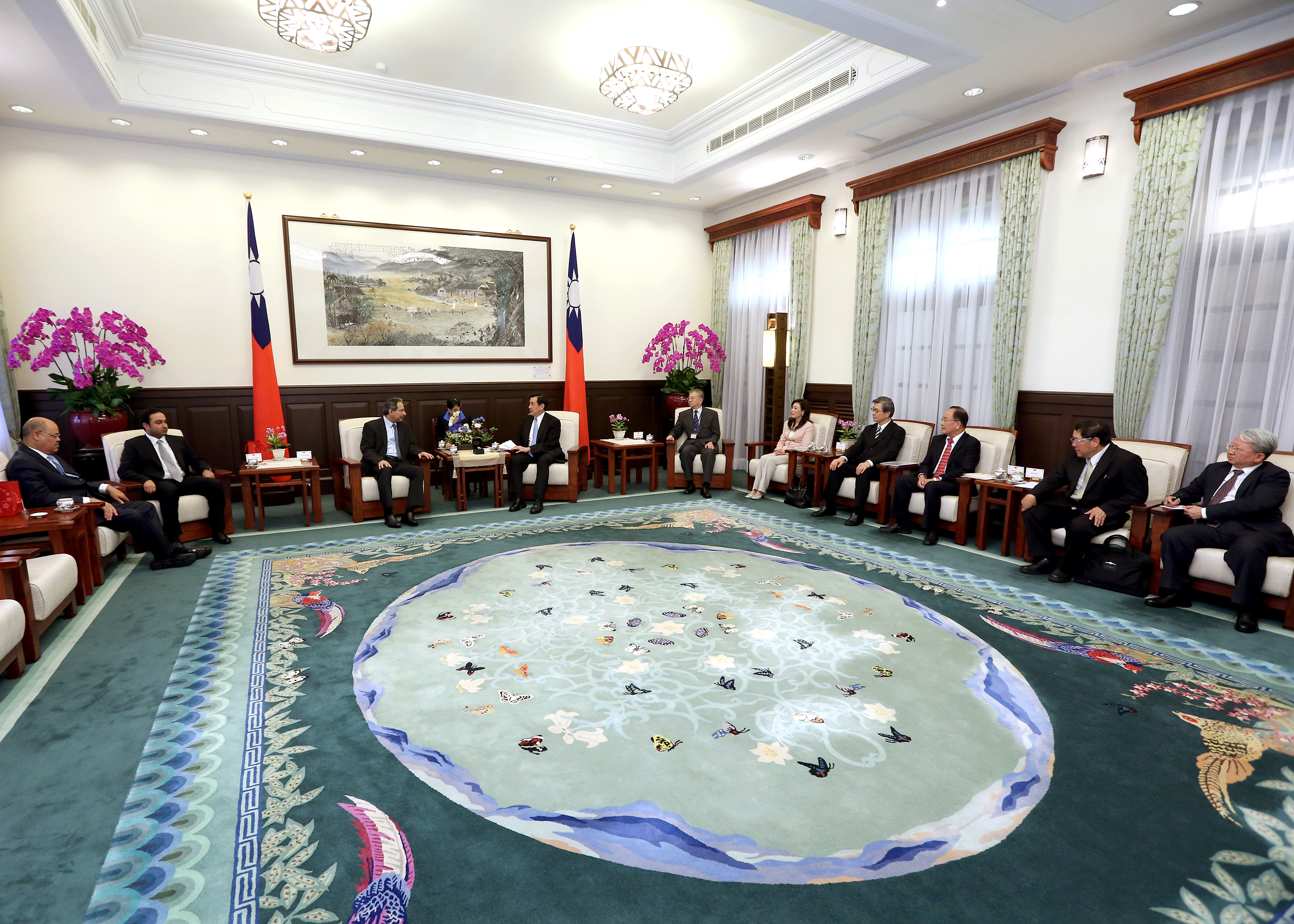

Former Governor of the Central Bank of the United Arab Emirates
- In office 18 December 1991 – September 2014
- President: Zayed bin Sultan Al Nahyan; Khalifa bin Zayed Al Nahyan
- Preceded by: Abdelmalik al-Hamar
- Succeeded by: Mubarak Rashid al-Mansoori

Personal details
- Born: 1953; Abu Dhabi

Sultan bin Nasser al-Suwaidi (born in 1953) is an Emirati banker and former long-term governor of the Central Bank of the United Arab Emirates.

Al-Suwaidi was born in 1953 in Abu Dhabi. He has a degree in business administration and finance. Al-Suwaidi started his career in 1978 in the finance and administration department of Abu Dhabi Investment Authority. In 1982, he joined Abu Dhabi Investment Company as general manager.

In 1984, he became general manager of Bahrain-based Gulf International Bank. In 1985, he was tasked with leading the three-bank merger to create Abu Dhabi Commercial Bank.

Al-Suwaidi was appointed governor of the Central Bank of the UAE in 1991. He introduced modernisation initiatives for banking processes and regulations. He was replaced as governor in September 2014.
