= Jaywan =

Emirati card payment system

- Native name: جيون
- Type: State-owned
- Industry: Finance
- Founded: 2024; 2 years ago
- Founder: Al Etihad Payments (AEP)
- Headquarters: Abu Dhabi, United Arab Emirates
- Products: Debit Card, Prepaid Card, Credit Card, Virtual Card
- Website: About Jaywan

Jaywan (Arabic: جيون, lit. 'precious pearl') is an Emirati card payment system wholly owned and operated by Al Etihad Payments (AEP), a subsidiary of the Central Bank of the United Arab Emirates.

== History ==
Jaywan is the UAE's first domestic card scheme, launched in 2024 with the aim to localize card payments and reduce transaction costs and also to strengthen UAE's Position as a Global Hub for Digital Payments.

By the end of 2024 several banks in the UAE integrated Jaywan card across their ATM networks, and more than 90% of the point-of-sale (PoS) terminals in the country supported Jaywan.

The card can be either mono-badged (Jaywan only) or co-badged, mono-badged cards can be used in the UAE and also in the GCC countries, while co-badged cards can be used locally and internationally in partnership with international payment networks.

In 2025, AEP signed several MOUs and agreements with several companies including:

- Master Card: To launch “Jaywan-Mastercard” co-badged debit and prepaid cards.
- Visa: To launch “Jaywan-Visa” co-badged debit and prepaid cards.
- UnionPay: To launch “Jaywan-UnionPay” co-badged debit and prepaid cards.
- Discover: To launch “Jaywan-Discover” co-badged debit and prepaid cards.
- Apple: To allow Jaywan card holders to add their cards to the Apple Wallet.
- Samsung: To allow Jaywan card holders to add their cards to the Samsung Wallet.
- Google: To allow Jaywan card holders to add their cards to the Google Pay Wallet.

As of Jan 2026 the Jaywan card is accepted by most of the PoS terminals and ATMs in the country, but not widely issued or used. This is expected to change by the end of 2027, as the UAE Central Bank mandates UAE banks to issue Jaywan debit cards to their customers over the next few years.

On April 27, 2026, Telr announced support for Jaywan cards on their online payment gateway.

On July 21, 2026, Al Etihad Payments and Mastercard signed an agreement to issue "Jaywan-Mastercard" co-badged credit cards.

On August 11, 2026, Al Etihad Payments and UnionPay International signed a MoU to facilitate the acceptance of mono-badged Jaywan cards outside the UAE and the GCC, through UnionPay's global network.

In September 2026, checkout.com integrated the Jaywan card.
