= National Bank of Abu Dhabi =

Former UAE-based bank

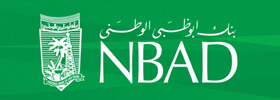
- Type: Public Joint Stock Company
- Traded as: ADX: FAB
- Industry: Banking
- Founded: 1968
- Defunct: 2016
- Successor: First Abu Dhabi Bank
- Headquarters: UAE
- Products: Loans, Savings, corporate banking, project finance, corporate advisory, treasury, leasing, property management, Islamic banking
- Total assets: $220.4 billion (2015)
- Subsidiaries: FAB Properties | Dubai First | FAB Securities

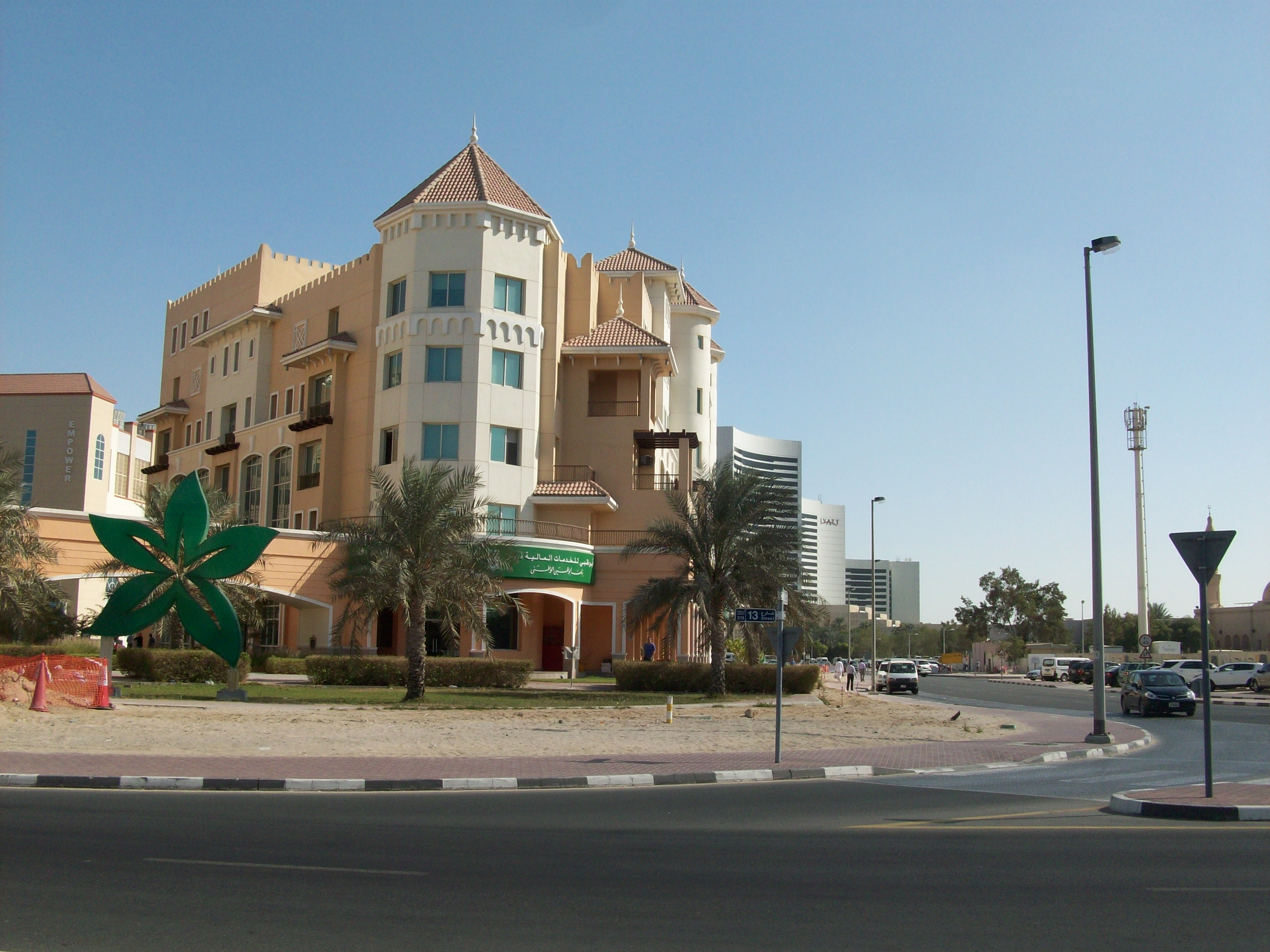
Abu Dhabi National Bank in Dubai

National Bank of Abu Dhabi (NBAD) (Arabic: بنك أبوظبي الوطني) was a bank operating in the United Arab Emirates (UAE) until it merged with the First Gulf Bank in December 2016 to form First Abu Dhabi Bank. NBAD was the largest lender bank in the Emirate of Abu Dhabi and in the United Arab Emirates. NBAD had the largest market capitalization among UAE banks.

NBAD's line of businesses included a range of retail banking, corporate, wholesale and investment banking, wealth management and private banking; as well as Islamic banking, brokerage, property management and leasing.

In 2015, NBAD set up a regional financial base in India as part of its overseas expansion strategy,

NBAD had regional presence in Kuala Lumpur, Hong Kong and a representative office in Shanghai, China. The bank was also expanding to the South Korean market to broaden its presence in Asia. In October 2012, the bank announced that it is planning to triple its contribution from Islamic banking by introducing sharia-compliant services in Oman and Malaysia.

NBAD's international branch network, the largest among UAE banks, spanned across 17 countries in five continents, from the Far East to Americas.

In December 2016, shareholders approved the bank's plans to merge with the First Gulf Bank (FGB) and both banks finalized the second-tier management by February 2017. The plan to merge the banks, which was first announced in June 2016, will be executed through a share swap, with FGB shareholders receiving 1.254 NBAD shares for each FGB share they hold. The merged entity is now known as First Abu Dhabi Bank and is currently the largest bank in the Middle East and North Africa.

== History ==
NBAD was founded in 1968, the emirate of Abu Dhabi's first bank.

NBAD was the first UAE bank to expand overseas opening a branch in 1975 in Cairo, Egypt In 1976 it expanded into Oman and Sudan, then in 1977 into the United Kingdom then France and then the United States of America in 1979. The bank's network expanded across five continents and 17 countries before its merger.

== Ownership ==
The bank was mostly owned by the Abu Dhabi Investment Council, in December 2013, 70.2% of shares were owned by ADIC and the remaining 21.9% owned by parties including the Government, corporate and private institutions.

== International network ==
NBAD expanded outside the UAE in 1975 with the launch of its branch in Egypt. Before its merger, NBAD had operated in 17 countries through branches, subsidiaries and representative offices. Overall, NBAD had nearly 60 branches and offices outside the UAE; Hong Kong, Malaysia (subsidiary), Oman, Bahrain, Kuwait, Jordan, Egypt, Sudan, Switzerland, through its subsidiary NBAD Private Bank (Suisse) SA, France, UK, the United States through its subsidiary Abu Dhabi International Bank. NBAD also had representative offices in Shanghai, China, São Paulo, Brazil, and Beirut, Lebanon. NBAD had said its growth strategy was based on expansion across the West-East Corridor, which it defined the area stretching from West of Africa to East of Asia. It had further said that it planned to build five international bank franchises across the West-East Corridor.

== Islamic banking ==
Sharia-compliant banking at NBAD was offered through its subsidiary Abu Dhabi National Islamic Finance Company. ADNIF was founded in 2008.

== Sponsorships ==
NBAD served as the Official Bank of Formula One Abu Dhabi Grand Prix, the first time held in Abu Dhabi in 2009, and in the subsequent years: 2010, 2011, 2012, 2013, 2014, 2015, 2016, 2017.

== Credit rating ==
Global Finance, had ranked NBAD for the fifth consecutive year among its ‘World’s 50 Safest Banks’.

On 10 October 2013, Standard & Poor's Ratings Services raised the National Bank of Abu Dhabi 's credit rating based on the strong link with the Government of Abu Dhabi and the important role the bank plays within Abu Dhabi. S&P raised NBAD's long- and short-term counterparty credit ratings on NBAD to 'AA-/A-1+' from 'A+/A-1'. The credit rating agency also affirmed NBAD 's "Stable" outlook.

NBAD was also rated Aa3/P1 by Moody's, AA-/F1+ by Fitch, A+ by Rating and Investment Information Inc (R&I) Japan, and AAA by RAM (Malaysia).

== Structure and businesses ==
In 2013 NBAD Group restructured its business operations into three units: 1. Global Wholesale 2. Gulf Retail and Commercial, 3. Global Wealth

In addition, the Bank had Two Geographies managing the franchise in each country, operating under NBAD's Gulf & International. The Geographies were 1. Gulf 2. International

== Subsidiaries ==
NBAD's Subsidiaries	Country of Incorporation
Abu Dhabi International Bank Inc.	Willemstad, Curaçao
Abu Dhabi Financial Services LLC	Abu Dhabi, United Arab Emirates
Abu Dhabi National Leasing LLC	Abu Dhabi, United Arab Emirates
Abu Dhabi National Properties LLC	Abu Dhabi, United Arab Emirates
NBAD Trust Company (Jersey) Limited	Saint Helier, Jersey
NBAD Private Bank (Suisse) SA	Geneva, Switzerland
Abu Dhabi National Islamic Finance Company	Abu Dhabi, United Arab Emirates
Ample China Holding Limited	Hong Kong
Abu Dhabi Brokerage Egypt	Cairo, Egypt

Abu Dhabi Capital Markets NYC

== Executives ==
Soon after the announcement of NBAD's merger with First Gulf Bank, NBAD announced that chief executive officer Alex Thursby has stepped down. He was replaced by Abhijit Choudhury as acting CEO. Choudhury joined NBAD as chief risk officer in December 2006. He was appointed as acting group chief executive officer in August 2016. Choudhury's banking career spans nearly 40 years, starting with ANZ Grindlays Bank in India. He continued to develop a comprehensive knowledge of Mideast markets after 17 years at the Arab Banking Corporation in Bahrain.

Mr. James Burdett is the group chief financial officer and was appointed to his role in May 2014. Mr. Burdett joined NBAD from Australia and New Zealand Banking Group (ANZ) where he served as chief financial officer international and institutional banking. Prior to this position, he was chief financial officer Asia Pacific, Europe and America at ANZ.

== Board of directors ==
NBAD board of directors in 2016:

- H. E. Nasser Ahmed Alsowaidi, Chairman, non-executive director
- Sheikh Mohammed Bin Saif Bin Mohammed Al Nahyan, non-executive director
- Sheikh Ahmed Mohammed Sultan Al Dhaheri, non-executive director
- Mr. Matar Hamdan Al Ameri, independent non-executive director
- H.E. Sultan Bin Rashed Al Dhaheri, non-executive director
- Mr. Khalifa Sultan Al Suwaidi, non-executive director
- H.E. Hareb Masood Al Darmaki, non-executive director
- H.E. Mohammed Omar Abdulla, non-executive director
- H.E. Sultan bin Nasser al-Suwaidi, non-executive director
- Ms. Mariam Saeed Ghobash, non-executive director
- Mr. Hashim Fawwaz Al Kudsi, non-executive director
- Mr. David Beau, independent non-executive director

== Senior management ==
- Abhijit Choudhury – acting group chief executive officer
- Abdulla Mohammed Saleh AbdulRaheem – deputy group chief executive officer
- Samer Abdelhaq – senior managing director and group general counsel – Legal and Compliance Division
- Mahmood Al Aradi – senior managing director and head of global markets
- Khalaf Sultan Bin Rashed Al Dhaheri – senior managing director and group chief operating officer
- Qamber Ali Al Mulla – senior managing director and CEO of Gulf and international
- Abdulla Bin Khalaf Al Otaiba – senior managing director and group head of global retail and commercial
- Saif Al Shehhi – senior managing director – Abu Dhabi Government and VVIP Clients
- James Burdett – group chief financial officer
- Rudiger Von Wedel – senior managing director of global wealth
- Malcolm Walker – senior managing director and group chief audit officer
- Akram Mark Yassin – senior managing director and head of global banking
