= United Arab Emirates dirham =

Currency of the United Arab Emirates

Emirati dirham
درهم إماراتي (Arabic)
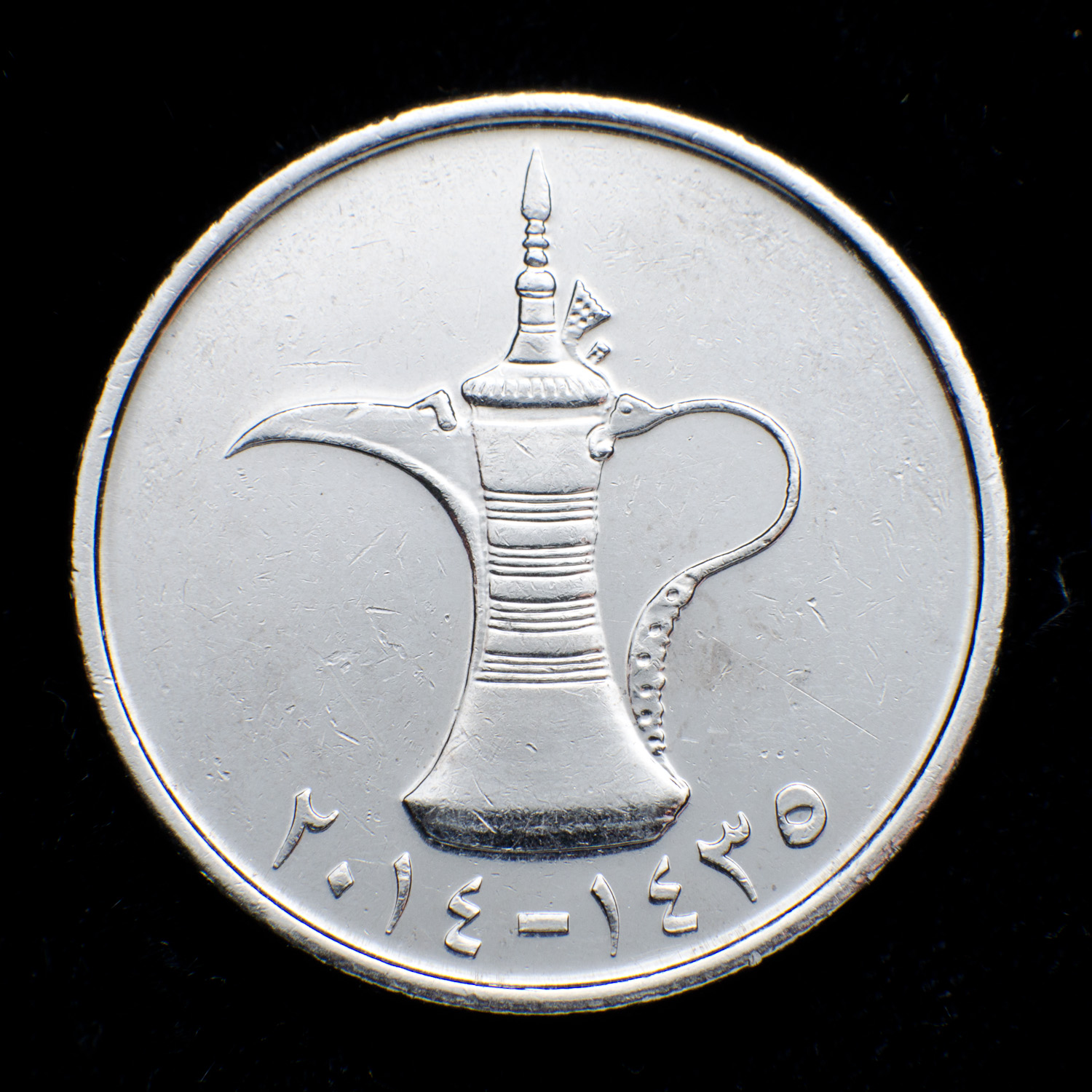
- Reverse of an Emirati one dirham coin

ISO 4217
- Code: AED (numeric: 784)
- Subunit: 0.01

Units of account
- Base unit: dirham
- Plural: darāhim (Arabic)
- Symbol: ⃃
- Subunit
- 1/100: fils
- Plural
- fils: fulus (Arabic)

Denominations
- Banknotes: Dhs5, Dhs10, Dhs20, Dhs50, Dhs100, Dhs200, Dhs500, Dhs1,000
- Coins
- Freq. used: 25, 50 fils, Dh1
- Rarely used: 1, 5, 10 fils

Demographics
- Date of introduction: 1973
- User(s): United Arab Emirates

Issuance
- Central bank: Central Bank of the UAE
- Website: www.centralbank.ae/en/

Valuation
- Inflation: 1.87%
- Source: The World Factbook, 2023
- Pegged with: USD; US$1 = Dhs 3.6725

The Emirati dirham (symbol: ⃃; currency code: AED; /ˈdɪər(h)əm/;) Arabic: درهم إماراتي, abbreviation: د.إ in Arabic, Dh; is the official currency of the United Arab Emirates. Each dirham is subdivided into 100 fulus (singular is "fils"). It is pegged to the United States dollar at a constant exchange rate of approximately 3.67 AED to 1 USD. In March 2025, the UAE Central Bank announced the creation of a Dirham currency symbol, ⃃, derived from the Latin letter D crossed with two horizontal lines.

== History ==
The name dirham is a loan from the Greek δραχμή (drakhmé). Due to centuries of trade and usage of the currency, dirham survived through the Ottoman Empire.

Before 1966, all the emirates that now form the UAE used the Gulf rupee, which was pegged at parity to the Indian rupee. On 6 June 1966, India decided to devalue the Gulf rupee against the Indian rupee. Not accepting the devaluation, several of the states still using the Gulf rupee adopted their own or other currencies. All the Trucial States except Abu Dhabi adopted the Qatar and Dubai riyal, which was equal to the Gulf rupee prior to the devaluation. These emirates briefly adopted the Saudi riyal during the transition from the Gulf rupee to the Qatar and Dubai riyal. Abu Dhabi used the Bahraini dinar, at a rate of 10 Gulf rupees = 1 dinar. In 1973, the UAE adopted the dirham as its currency. Abu Dhabi adopted the UAE dirham in place of the Bahraini dinar, at 1 dinar = 10 dirhams, while in the other emirates, the Qatar and Dubai riyal were exchanged at par.

=== Currency symbol ===
UAE Dirham symbol

In March 2025, the Central Bank of the UAE announced a currency symbol of the dirham. Its design based on two horizontal lines with curved ends (inspired by the UAE flag) superimposed on the Latin letter D. The symbol was encoded in Unicode version 18 as U+20C3 ⃃ UAE DIRHAM SIGN, in September 2026.

== Coins ==
In 1973, coins were introduced in denominations of 1, 5, 10, 25, and 50 fils, as well as 1 dirham. The 1, 5, and 10 fils are struck in bronze, while the higher denominations were made in cupro-nickel. The fils coins were the same size and composition as the corresponding Qatar and Dubai dirham coins. In 1995, the five fils, 10 fils, 50 fils, and 1 dirham coins were reduced in size, with the new 50 fils being curve-equilateral-heptagonal shaped.

The value and numbers on the coins are written in Eastern Arabic numerals, and the text is in Arabic. Although the 1, 5, and 10 fils coins are rarely used in everyday life, the Central Bank of the UAE continues to produce them. However, these coins are primarily minted for collectors and commemorative purposes rather than for mass circulation. So all amounts are rounded up or down to the nearest multiples of 25 fils. The one-fils coin is a rarity and does not circulate significantly. When making a change, there is a risk of confusing the old 50-fils coin with the modern 1-dirham coin because the coins are almost the same size.

Since 1976, the Currency Board of the United Arab Emirates has minted several commemorative coins celebrating different events and rulers of the United Arab Emirates. For details, see Commemorative coins of the United Arab Emirates dirham.

Current issue (1973)
Image		Value	Diameter (mm)	Mass (g)	Composition	Edge	Obverse	Reverse	Issue	Notes
Obverse	Reverse	Value	Diameter (mm)	Mass (g)	Composition	Edge	Obverse	Reverse	Issue	Notes
		1 fils	15.00	1.50	Bronze	Smooth	Three date palms; Lettering: لزيادة انتاج المحاصيل الغذائية; year of issue (Gregorian and Hijri)	Value and lettering: الامارات العربية المتحدة, United Arab Emirates	1973–2005	
		1 fils	15.00	1.50	Copper-plated steel	Smooth	Three date palms; Lettering: لزيادة انتاج المحاصيل الغذائية; year of issue (Gregorian and Hijri)	Value and lettering: الامارات العربية المتحدة, United Arab Emirates	2018	In proof and uncirculated sets only
		5 fils	22.00	3.75	Bronze	Smooth	Lethrinus nebulous; Lettering: نظافة البحار تعني المزيد من الغذاء للبشر; year of issue (Gregorian and Hijri)	Value and lettering: الامارات العربية المتحدة, United Arab Emirates	1973–1989	
		5 fils	17.00	2.20	Bronze	Smooth	Lethrinus nebulous; Lettering: نظافة البحار تعني المزيد من الغذاء للبشر; year of issue (Gregorian and Hijri)	Value and lettering: الامارات العربية المتحدة, United Arab Emirates	1996–2014	
		5 fils	17.00	2.20	Copper-plated steel	Smooth	Lethrinus nebulous; Lettering: نظافة البحار تعني المزيد من الغذاء للبشر; year of issue (Gregorian and Hijri)	Value and lettering: الامارات العربية المتحدة, United Arab Emirates	2018	In proof and uncirculated sets only
		10 fils	27.00	7.50	Bronze	Smooth	Dhow; year of issue (Gregorian and Hijri)	Value and lettering: الامارات العربية المتحدة, United Arab Emirates	1973–1989	
		10 fils	19.00	3.00	Bronze	Smooth	Dhow; year of issue (Gregorian and Hijri)	Value and lettering: الامارات العربية المتحدة, United Arab Emirates	1996–2011	
		10 fils	19.00	3.00	Copper-plated steel	Smooth	Dhow; year of issue (Gregorian and Hijri)	Value and lettering: الامارات العربية المتحدة, United Arab Emirates	2017	In proof and uncirculated sets only
		25 fils	20.00	3.50	Cupronickel	Reeded	Arabian gazelle; year of issue (Gregorian and Hijri)	Value and lettering: الامارات العربية المتحدة, United Arab Emirates	1973–2011	
		25 fils	20.00	3.48	Nickel-plated steel	Reeded	Arabian gazelle; year of issue (Gregorian and Hijri)	Value and lettering: الامارات العربية المتحدة, United Arab Emirates	2014–present	
		50 fils	25.00	6.50	Cupronickel	Reeded	Three oil derricks; year of issue (Gregorian and Hijri)	Value and lettering: الامارات العربية المتحدة, United Arab Emirates	1973–1989	
		50 fils	21.00 (heptagonal)	4.40	Cupronickel	Smooth	Three oil derricks; year of issue (Gregorian and Hijri)	Value and lettering: الامارات العربية المتحدة, United Arab Emirates	1995–2007	
		50 fils	21.00 (heptagonal)	4.15	Nickel-plated steel	Smooth	Three oil derricks; year of issue (Gregorian and Hijri)	Value and lettering: الامارات العربية المتحدة, United Arab Emirates	2013–present	
		Dh 1	28.50	11.30	Cupronickel	Reeded	Dallah; year of issue (Gregorian and Hijri)	Value and lettering: الامارات العربية المتحدة, United Arab Emirates	1973–1989	
		Dh 1	24.00	6.40	Cupronickel	Reeded	Dallah; year of issue (Gregorian and Hijri)	Value and lettering: الامارات العربية المتحدة, United Arab Emirates	1995–2007	
		Dh 1	24.00	6.10	Nickel-plated steel	Reeded	Dallah; year of issue (Gregorian and Hijri)	Value and lettering: الامارات العربية المتحدة, United Arab Emirates	2012–present	

=== Issues with fraud ===
By August 2006, it became publicly known that the Philippine one-peso coin is the same size as one dirham. As 1 peso is only worth eight fils, this has led to vending machine fraud in the UAE. Pakistan's 5-rupee coin, the Omani 50-baisa coin, and the Moroccan 1 dirham are also the exact size as the Emirati one dirham coin. The 20 Gapik Coin is almost the same size as the 1 Dirham Coin. Although 1 mm thinner, a one dirham coin has also been found in ten-cent coin rolls in Australia.

== Banknotes ==
On 20 May 1973, the UAE Currency Board introduced notes in denominations of 1, 5, 10, 50, and 100 dirhams; a Dhs 1,000 note was issued on 3 January 1976. A second series of note was introduced in 1982 which omitted the Dh 1 and Dhs 1,000 notes. Dhs 500 notes were introduced in 1983, followed by Dhs 200 in 1989. Dhs 1,000 notes were reintroduced in 2000. Banknotes are currently available in denominations of Dhs 5 (brown), Dhs 10 (green), Dhs 20 (light blue), Dhs 50 (purple), Dhs 100 (pink), Dhs 200 (green/brown), Dhs 500 (navy blue) and Dhs 1,000 (greenish blue).

The obverse texts are written in Arabic with numbers in Eastern Arabic numerals; the reverse texts are in English with numbers in Arabic numerals. The 200 dirham denomination is scarce as it was only produced in 1989; any circulating today comes from bank stocks. The 200 dirham denomination has since been reissued and is now in circulation since late May 2008 – it has been reissued in a different colour; Yellow/Brown to replace the older Green/Brown.

On 22 March 2008, the Central Bank of the United Arab Emirates released a Dhs 50 note. The security thread was a 3-mm wide, colour-shifting windowed security thread with demetalized UAE 50, and it bore the new coat of arms. On 7 December 2021, a redesigned polymer Dhs 50 note was released to commemorate the golden jubilee of the country on 2 December 2021, making it the UAE's first polymer banknote. Additional new polymer banknotes of Dhs 5 and Dhs 10 were introduced on 21 April 2022, with the Dhs 1000 released in the first half of 2023, and the Dhs 500 note reportedly introduced on 30 November 2023. A falcon watermark is present on all dirham notes as a deterrent to counterfeiting and fraud.

=== Second issue ===
Image	Value	Dimensions (mm)	Main colour	Description		Issue
Image	Value	Dimensions (mm)	Main colour	Obverse	Reverse	Issue
	Dhs 5	143 × 60	Brown	Central Souq, Sharjah	Northern Emirates landscape Salem Al Mutawa Mosque, Sharjah	1982
	Dhs 10	147 × 62	Green	Khanjar	Pilot farm	1982
	Dhs 20	149 × 63	Cyan	Creek Golf and Yacht Club, Dubai	Trading dhow	1997
	Dhs 50	151 × 64	Purple	Oryx	Al Jahili Fort, Al Ain	1982
	Dhs 100	155 × 66	Red	Al Fahidi Fort, Dubai	World Trade Centre, Dubai	1982
	Dhs 200	157 × 67	Orange	Sharia court building Zayed Sports City Stadium, Abu Dhabi	Central bank building, Abu Dhabi	1989
	Dhs 500	159 × 68	Blue	Saker falcon	Jumeirah Mosque, Dubai	1983
	Dhs 1000	163 × 70	Turquoise	Qasr al-Hosn, Abu Dhabi	Corniche, Abu Dhabi	1998

=== Third issue ===
Image	Value	Dimensions (mm)	Main colour	Description		Issue
Image	Value	Dimensions (mm)	Main colour	Obverse	Reverse	Issue
	Dhs 5	143 × 66	Brown	Ajman Fort (Ajman)	Dhayah Fort (Ras Al Khaimah)	26 April 2022
	Dhs 10	147 × 66	Green	Sheikh Zayed Grand Mosque (Abu Dhabi)	Khor Fakkan Amphitheatre (Sharjah)	21 April 2022
	Dhs 50	151 × 66	Purple	Union's founding fathers	Zayed bin Sultan Al Nahyan; Etihad Museum (Dubai)	23 December 2021
	Dhs 100	155 × 66	Pink	Umm Al Quwain Fort	Port of Fujairah; Etihad Rail	24 March 2025
	Dhs 500	159 × 66	Blue	Terra Pavilion (Dubai)	Museum of the Future; Burj Khalifa (Dubai)	30 November 2023
	Dhs 1000	163 × 66	Olive brown	Zayed bin Sultan Al Nahyan; Hope probe	Barakah nuclear power plant (Abu Dhabi)	10 April 2023

== Exchange rates ==
On 28 January 1978, the dirham was officially pegged to the IMF's special drawing rights (SDRs). In practice, it has been pegged to the U.S. dollar for most of the time. Since November 1997, the dirham has been pegged to the US dollar at a rate of US$1 = Dhs 3.6725, which translates to approximately Dh 1 = US$0.272294.

Current AED exchange rates
From Google Finance:	AUD CAD CHF CNY EUR GBP HKD JPY USD SAR BHD INR
From Yahoo! Finance:	AUD CAD CHF CNY EUR GBP HKD JPY USD SAR BHD INR
From XE.com:	AUD CAD CHF CNY EUR GBP HKD JPY USD SAR BHD INR
From OANDA:	AUD CAD CHF CNY EUR GBP HKD JPY USD SAR BHD INR

== See also ==
- Cooperation Council for the Arab States of the Gulf
- Economy of the United Arab Emirates
- Moroccan dirham
- Emirati dirham sign
- Jaywan
- List of banks in the United Arab Emirates
