= First Gulf Bank =

Defunct Emirati bank

First Gulf Bank PJSC
- Type: Public
- Traded as: ADX: FGB
- Industry: Financial services
- Founded: 1979
- Defunct: 2016
- Successor: First Abu Dhabi Bank
- Headquarters: Abu Dhabi, UAE
- Products: Wholesale banking Consumer Banking; Treasury and investments
- Number of employees: 2,000
- Website: www.fgb.ae

FGB (formerly known as First Gulf Bank) was the third largest bank by assets in the United Arab Emirates (UAE), until it merged with the National Bank of Abu Dhabi in December 2016 to form First Abu Dhabi Bank, creating the largest bank by assets in the UAE. Established in 1979, FGB is headquartered in the Emirate of Abu Dhabi. FGB offers a wide range of financial services in the wholesale, consumer, and treasury banking sectors, including Islamic banking and bancassurance solutions for businesses and consumers via a network of branches across the UAE. Internationally, FGB has a branch in Singapore - that includes global wealth management services and a branch in Qatar, representative offices in London, India, Hong Kong, and Seoul, South Korea, and a subsidiary in Libya.

In 2013, the bank restructured its business into three divisions: the Wholesale Banking Group, the Consumer Banking Group, and the Treasury & Global Markets Group. In the same year, FGB also announced that it had acquired full ownership of Shariah-compliant finance company Aseel Islamic Finance and consumer finance firm Dubai First.

In December 2016, shareholders approved the bank's plans to merge with the National Bank of Abu Dhabi (NBAD) and both banks finalized the second-tier management by February 2017. The plan to merge the banks, which was first announced in June 2016, will be executed through a share swap, with FGB shareholders receiving 1.254 NBAD shares for each FGB share they hold. The merged entity is now known as First Abu Dhabi Bank.

== Growth and successes ==
FGB had Shareholder Equity of AED 34.1 billion as of December 31, 2014, making it one of the largest equity based banks in the UAE.

FGB reported a total net profit of AED 5.66 billion in 2014, which represents an 18% increase when compared with AED 4.77 billion achieved in 2013. 2014 also marked the 15th consecutive year of uninterrupted net profit growth for the bank.

The bank’s consistent performance led to a Financial Strength Rating of 'A+' from Capital Intelligence in 2014. In 2013, RAM Ratings provided the bank with an AAA grade, and FGB’s Long Term Rating was affirmed at A+ by Fitch.

Forbes Middle East ranked FGB as the 8th-most powerful company and 4th leading bank in its 2014 ‘Top 500 Companies in the Arab World’ list. FGB was also named the ‘Best Bank in the United Arab Emirates’ and ‘Best Wealth Management Firm’ at the Banker Middle East Industry Awards 2014.

== International activities ==
Throughout 2014, FGB enhanced its presence in the Asia Pacific market with the launch of a new representative office in South Korea and a Global Wealth Management service at its Singapore branch. The bank also opened a new representative office in London and has announced plans to open a new office in China in the future.

FGB’s other international activities in 2014 include the conclusion of a Negotiable Certificate of Deposit (NCD) programme via its Singapore branch and the issuance of the bank’s debut 250 million Australian dollars (USD 228.35 million) ‘Kangaroo’ 5-year bond. FGB has also received approval for a Sukuk issuance in Malaysia and became the first MENA issuer in the Tokyo Pro-Bond Market, selling a debut 10 billion yen (USD 98.2 million) bond.

== New brand ==
In April 2014, FGB, formerly known as First Gulf Bank, unveiled its current logo after announcing a shift in the bank’s corporate identity. As part of the rebrand, the bank adopted the acronym, ‘FGB’, which was already widely used by its stakeholders. FGB remains First Gulf Bank in Arabic however, and no changes have been made to the bank as a legal entity.

FGB announced to the media that the rebrand was part of a long-term strategy to grow the bank locally and internationally, and reflects its UAE and Abu Dhabi heritage, commitment to Emirati development, and aspirations and ambitions for further success and growth in the future.

== Sponsorships ==
FGB is a sponsor of Ferrari World Abu Dhabi (FWAD), the largest indoor and the only Ferrari-branded theme park in the world. FGB sponsors the Junior GT ride at FWAD, which is part of its driving school where children receive their first training about road safety and discipline and learn about the essential rules they will need to abide by once they start driving.

The bank also sponsors the Al Ain Sports & Cultural Club and in 2014, launched the ‘FGB Arena’, which is located in Zayed Sports City, Abu Dhabi. The ‘FGB Arena’ is home to a range of regular programmes, from sports and music events to conferences and exhibitions. Managed by an operator in co-operation with FGB, the venue can accommodate up to 6,000 spectators.
