= Central Bank of the United Arab Emirates =

Monetary authority of the United Arab Emirates

Coordinates: 24°27′23″N 54°20′13″E

Central Bank of the United Arab Emirates مصرف الإمارات العربية المتحدة المركزي

- Headquarters building in Abu Dhabi
- Central bank of: United Arab Emirates
- Headquarters: King Abdullah Bin Abdulaziz Al Saud Street, Al Bateen, Abu Dhabi
- Established: 11 December 1980; 45 years ago
- Governor: Khaled Mohamed Balama
- Currency: Emirati dirham AED (ISO 4217)
- Reserves: US$295 billion (2025)
- Bank rate: 3.65%
- Website: centralbank.ae/en

The Central Bank of the United Arab Emirates (Arabic: مصرف الإمارات العربية المتحدة المركزي) (Central Bank of the UAE or CBUAE) is UAE's central bank, the state institution responsible for managing the currency, monetary policy, banking and insurance regulation.

== History ==
The Qatar and Dubai Currency Board was established in 1966, and split in 1973 into separate arrangements for Qatar and the UAE respectively. In the latter, its successor was the United Arab Emirates Currency Board, which was actually a fully-fledged central bank rather than a mere currency board but adopted that name to reassure investors about monetary stability. That "Currency Board" was established on 19 May 1973. This followed the creation of the UAE as an independent state in 1971. The original purpose of the UAE Currency Board was to issue an independent currency for the new state to replace the existing currencies in use: the Qatari riyal and the Bahraini Dinar. The new UAE dirham entered circulation on the same day the Currency Board was established.

At this time, the Currency Board of the UAE did not have full central bank powers. It was mandated to manage the currency and the country's gold and foreign exchange reserves but did not have regulatory authority and was not empowered to manage the UAE's monetary policy. The Union Law No (10) of 1980 saw the establishment of the Central Bank of the UAE as a public institution. The Law No (10) also augmented the functions of the Central Bank (previously assigned to the Currency Board) – Abdul Malik Yousef Al Hamar appointed Governor. Decretal Federal Law No. (14) of 2018 regarding the Central Bank & Organisation of Financial Institutions and Activities issued.

The Central Bank of the UAE has powers to issue and manage the currency; to ensure the stability of the currency; to manage the UAE's credit policy; to develop and oversee the banking system in the UAE; to act as the Government's banker; to provide monetary and financial support to the Government; to manage the UAE's gold and currency reserves; to act as the lender of last resort to banks operating in the UAE; and to represent the UAE in international institutions such as the International Monetary Fund, the World Bank and the Arab Monetary Fund.

== Governors ==
Governor	Took office	Left office	Notes
Ronald Scott	? - 1975	1977	Director of the Currency Board
Abdelmalik al-Hamar	1977	1980	Director of the Currency Board
Abdelmalik al-Hamar	1980	1991	First governor, Bahraini
Sultan bin Nasser al-Suwaidi	December 1991	September 2014	
Mubarak Rashid al-Mansoori	September 2014	2020	
Abdulhamid M. Saeed	April 2020	April 2021	
Khaled Mohamed Balama	April 2021		

== Leadership ==
=== Board of directors ===
- Sheikh Mansour bin Zayed Al Nahyan, Chairman
- Abdulrahman Al Saleh, Vice Chairman
- Jassem Mohammad Buatabah Al Zaabi, Vice Chairman
- Khaled Mohamed Balama, Governor
- Younis Al Khoori, Member
- Ali Mohammed Bakheet Al Rumaithi, Member
- Sami Dhaen Al Qamzi, Member

== Organization and functions ==
=== Branches ===
In addition to its Head Office in Abu Dhabi, the Bank has branches in five other cities in the UAE. The cities are the following:

- Dubai
- Al Ain
- Fujairah
- Ras Al Khaimah
- Sharjah

=== Banking Supervision and Examination Department ===
Banking Supervision and Examination Department is responsible for regulatory oversight of the UAE banking industry. A significant part of the department is located in the Bank's Dubai office, since the banking industry in the UAE is largely concentrated in this city. The scope of its regulatory mandate includes local banks, foreign banks operating in the UAE as well as finance companies, exchange houses, payment service providers (PSP) and non-banking financial institutions (NBFI's), including financial advisory practices.

The department functions include the issuing of licenses to banking institutions, setting banking standards and regulations, and monitoring compliance. The department is also responsible for liaison and co-operation with international standards bodies and banking organisations, notably the Bank for International Settlements, the Financial Action Task Force, the International Monetary Fund, and the World Bank.

=== Banking Operations Department ===
Banking Operations Department is mainly responsible for managing the following:

- The U.A.E. currency in all its phases (design, security features and technical specifications, issuance, counting, sorting, fitment, quality assurance, etc.).
- The issuance of commemorative coins as per the Central Bank policies and procedures.
- The current accounts opened at the Central Bank for the Federal and Government entities, Financial Institutes operating in the country and the other regional and international institutes.
- The payment, clearing and settlement systems owned by the Central Bank and enhancing these systems in coordination with the participants.
- The facilitation of the domestic financial market infrastructure for cross-border remittances via the regional and international payment systems.
- The Correspondent Banking relationships and all related transactions with the relevant international entities.
- The CBUAE museum.

=== Research and Statistics Department ===
Research and Statistics Department (RSD) at CBUAE is composed of two divisions: Research and Analysis division (RAD) and Statistics and Data Center (SDC). RAD's core activities include publishing high quality reports: the annual report and the quarterly economic review, in addition to weekly and monthly reports to Managers and the UAE leadership. Moreover, RAD conducts high quality research to support informed policy decisions. RAD also supports the UAE national agenda, by collaborating with the national stakeholders at the federal and local levels, as well as with regional and international organizations to safeguard the reputation of the UAE and improve its rankings in international competitiveness indicators.

SDC engages in the compilation and dissemination of Monetary, Banking, and External Sector statistics, including monthly statistical reports that capture the largest share of the financial sector regulated by CBUAE. In addition, SDC publishes quarterly reports on the UAE Monetary, Banking & Financial Market Developments, Financial Soundness Indicators, and annual balance of payments statistics. SDC has developed and maintained electronic database covering historical time-series. The data are readily available on CBUAE's web site to meet the regular needs of researchers, and domestic and external stakeholders.

=== Administration Affairs Department ===
Administration Affairs Department covers a number of back office functions. These include managing the Procurement, Facilities Management, Public Relations, archiving of records and security guards.

=== Finance Department ===
Finance Department oversees and supports the deployment of financial resources by delivering the following services:

- Financial Accounting and Reporting
- Financial Planning
- Staff and Vendor Payments
- Treasury operations and settlement
- Cash Management monitoring

=== Internal Audit Department ===
The Internal Audit's function is to provide independent, objective assurance and consulting services designed to add value and improve CBUAE's operations.

The mission of internal audit is to enhance and protect organizational value by providing risk-based and objective assurance, advice, and insight.

The Internal Audit Department has a key role in the corporate governance structure to assure on the management of risk and achieving objectives. Internal audit, acts as the third line of defence, providing independent assurance on the effectiveness of governance, risk management, and internal controls, including the manner in which the first and second lines of defence achieve risk management and control objectives.

=== Consumer Protection Department ===
Consumer Protection Department works to protect consumers from financial misconduct through education, policy-making, and compliance monitoring and tracking of complaints resolution.

== See also ==
- Ministry of Finance (United Arab Emirates)
- Economy of the United Arab Emirates
- United Arab Emirates dirham
- Jaywan
- Emirates interbank offered rate (EIBOR)
- Mohammad Al Gaz
- List of central banks
- List of financial supervisory authorities by country
