= International Program in Conflict Resolution and Mediation =

The International Program in Conflict Resolution and Mediation is an interdisciplinary English-language master's degree program offered at Tel Aviv University in Israel.

== History ==
The International Program in Conflict Resolution and Mediation, founded in October 2009, teaches students from around the world the fundamentals of conflict resolution. Consisting of three consecutive semesters, the International Program aims to provide students with the insight and skills needed to address the assessment, management, and resolution of conflicts in the international arena.

The first semester exposes students to a comprehensive survey of conflicts and their resolution from diverse perspectives, including international law, psychology, political science, anthropology and economics. The second and third semesters gives students the chance to choose from a variety of courses according to their interests. Throughout the semesters, special focus is placed on combining practical experience to the theoretical knowledge through interactive teaching, culminating in the intensive mediation workshop taught in smaller groups and through simulations.

Academic trips are planned throughout the year, visiting various sites around Israel in conjunction with the curriculum. In addition, speakers from the United Nations, the Israeli Foreign Ministry, embassies, NGOs and visiting professors are invited each week to share their experiences and research, and provide students with professional networking opportunities.

Courses reflect the relevant in the field of conflict resolution, in addition to the resources in Israel and the Middle East: core courses on Middle East History and Israeli politics; framing coursework to focus on international approaches; and offering a greater variety of interdisciplinary elective courses.

Courses are taught in the afternoon, four days per week, allowing students to pursue volunteering and internship opportunities, as well as language courses in Hebrew and colloquial Arabic.

Interviews with students and alumni are regularly featured in Israeli and international media.

== See also ==
- Education in Israel
