= Abraham Nitzan =

Israeli chemist (born 1944)

- אברהם ניצן
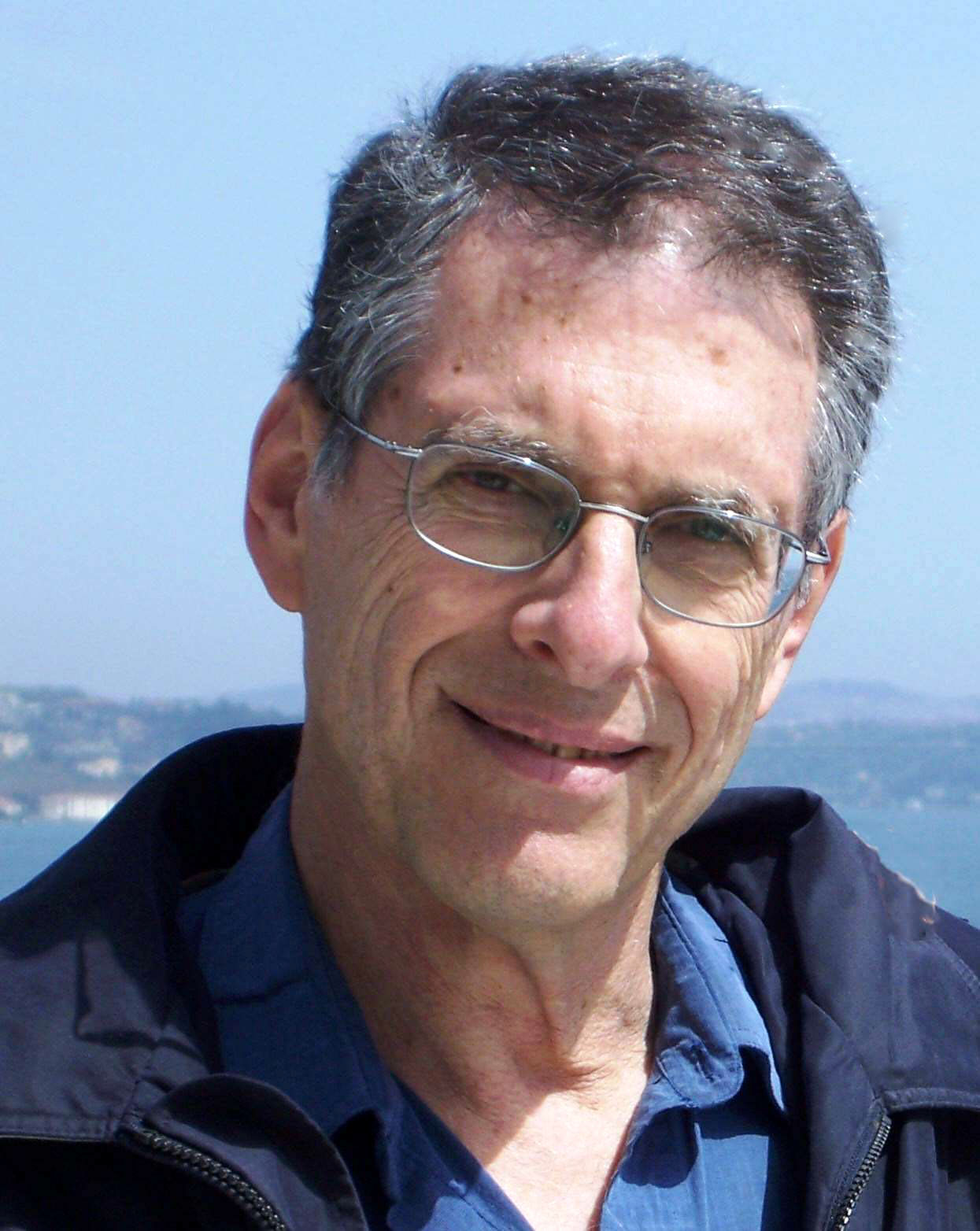
- Nitzan in 2006
- Born: 1944 (age 81–82); Tel Aviv, Mandatory Palestine
- Education: Hebrew University, Tel Aviv University
- Known for: Chemical dynamics in condense phases and at interfaces, Molecular Electronics
- Awards: Israel Prize, EMET Prize
- Scientific career
- Fields: Chemical physics
- Workplaces: Tel Aviv University, Israel, University of Pennsylvania
- Website: atto.tau.ac.il/~nitzan

Abraham Nitzan (Hebrew: אברהם ניצן; born 1944) is a professor of chemistry at the Tel Aviv University department of chemical physics and the University of Pennsylvania department of chemistry.

== Education ==
Abraham Nitzan was born in Tel Aviv. He received his bachelor's degree in chemistry from the Hebrew University in Jerusalem in 1964, and his master's degree in physical chemistry from the same institute in 1966. His research towards the master's degree, on the radiation chemistry of aqueous solutions, was supervised by Gideon Czapski. During the period of 1966 to 1969, he served in the Israel Defense Forces and in 1972 completed his Ph.D. studies at Tel Aviv University under the supervision of Joshua Jortner. His thesis focused on the theory of non-radiative transitions in large molecules.

== Professional career ==
From 1972 to 1974, Nitzan worked as a research fellow at the Massachusetts Institute of Technology. The following year he stayed at Northwestern University, after which he returned to Israel and joined the faculty of the chemistry department of Tel Aviv University. In 1981 he was promoted to the rank of professor. Between 1983 and 1986 he served as head of the School of Chemistry, developing study programs integrating the study of Chemistry with other subjects, and in the period 1995-1998 he served as dean of the Faculty of Exact Sciences. Among his academic duties, he served as head of the faculty teaching committee, member of the university promotions committee, and Senate representative in the central committee and board of trustees. He was also a member of the Ministry of Education topical committee on Chemistry. Current to 2012, Nitzan directs the Advanced Studies Institute at Tel Aviv University. Apart from his being a professor and visiting researcher at universities around the world, Nitzan was a member of the editorial boards of the scientific journals "Physical Review Letters", "Journal of Chemical Physics" and "Journal of Physical Chemistry".

== Research ==
Nitzan's field of research is chemical dynamics, which studies the dynamics of chemical processes on the microscopic level. In particular, his studies deal with processes involving interactions between light and matter, chemical reactions in condensed phases and chemical processes at interfaces. His early research (1970-1980) has focused on energy transfer processes in molecular systems. This was followed (1980-1990) a series of works (with Joel Gersten) on surface enhanced optical process that later led to the development of the field of molecular plasmonics, as well as works on activated rate processes and charge transfer in complex molecular environments. Later work focused on electron solvation, transfer and transport in molecular environment and at interfaces, culminating in a series of studies (with Mark Ratner, Michael Galperin, Dvira Segal and others) on molecular electronics. By 2012, he has published 350 scientific articles, and his work has been presented in dozens of international conferences. He was ranked as one of the hundred top chemists in the world between 2000 and 2010, as ranked by the impact of their scientific research, by Science Watch.

His research subjects are topics in chemical dynamics, which studies chemical reactions in chemical and physical processes. In particular, his studies deal with processes involving interactions between light and matter, chemical reactions in condensed phases and chemical processes at interfaces. In the years 1970-1980 his activity was focused on energy transfer processes in molecular systems, and during his stay at MIT, Nitzan conducted research with John Ross which predicted the existence of periodic chemical reactions in photochemical systems away from equilibrium. In his work during the 1980s, he was among the founders of the field of molecular plasmonics. A series of studies he conducted between 1975 and 1995 brought to the development of theories of chemical processes in complex molecules, and of models for the description of electron transfer in such systems. By 2012, 350 scientific articles were published by him, and his work has been presented in dozens of international conferences. He was ranked as one of the hundred top chemists in the world between 2000 and 2010 by Science Watch.

== Honors and awards ==
Nitzan is a member of the Israel Academy of Sciences and Humanities, a fellow of American Association for the Advancement of Science and of the American Physical Society, a foreign honorary member of the American Academy of Arts and Sciences and a foreign associate of the National Academy of Sciences. He received an Honorary Doctorate (Doctor Honoris Causa) from the University of Konstanz in 2010. Apart from these, his work has earned him many awards, some of which are:

- Fulbright scholarship (1972)
- I. M. Kolthoff award (1995)
- Humboldt Prize (1995)
- Israel Chemical Society Prize (2003)
- Israel Prize in chemistry (2010)
- The EMET Prize in chemistry (2012)
- Israel Chemical Society Medal (2015)
