= Joseph Klafter =

Israeli chemical physics professor (born 1945)

- יוסף קלפטר
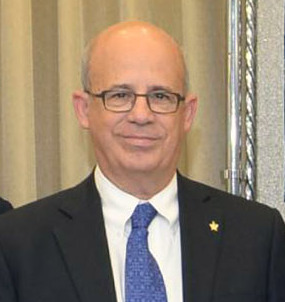
- Joseph Klafter
- Born: Joseph (Yossi) Klafter; May 7, 1945 in Tel Aviv, Mandatory Palestine; Tel Aviv, Mandatory Palestine
- Education: Bar-Ilan University (BSc, MSc); Tel Aviv University (PhD)
- Occupation: chemical physics professor
- Known for: Anomalous diffusion theory; Lévy walks; fractional Fokker-Planck equation; President of Tel Aviv University (2009–2019)
- Title: Heineman Chair of Physical Chemistry at Tel Aviv University
- Awards: Weizmann Prize; Alexander von Humboldt Foundation Prize; Rothschild Prize in Chemistry; Israel Prize (2020); ICS Gold Medal (2025)

Joseph (Yossi) Klafter (Hebrew: יוסף קלפטר; born May 7, 1945) is an Israeli chemical physics professor at Tel Aviv University. He served as the eighth President of Tel Aviv University from 2009 to 2019. He was awarded the 2020 Israel Prize in Chemistry and Physics and the 2025 Israel Chemical Society Gold Medal.

Klafter is known for contributions to the theoretical framework of anomalous diffusion and random processes in complex systems. His work includes the formal derivation of the continuous-time random-walk (CTRW) Equation, the introduction of Lévy walks, and major contributions to fractional dynamics. He was among the first to propose that Lévy-type walks could provide an efficient strategy for locating randomly distributed, hidden targets, helping establish the theoretical basis for Lévy search and foraging. His research has had broad applications across physics, chemistry, and biology.

== Biography ==
Joseph Klafter was born in Tel Aviv in 1945, in what was then Mandatory Palestine, to Slovak immigrant parents who arrived in Palestine in 1939 as part of Aliyah Bet. He attended elementary and high school in Rishon LeZion.

Klafter studied physics at Bar-Ilan University, where he received his BSc and MSc degrees. He subsequently earned his PhD in chemistry from Tel Aviv University under the supervision of Prof. Joshua Jortner. He then engaged in post-doctoral research in chemistry at the Massachusetts Institute of Technology (MIT), before joining Exxon Research and Engineering, where he spent eight years as a senior researcher.

Klafter joined the Tel Aviv University Raymond and Beverly Sackler School of Chemistry in 1987 and became a full professor in 1989. He was the Gordon Chair in Chemistry from 1998 to 2003 and was named Heineman Chair of Physical Chemistry in 2003.

From 2002 to 2009 he chaired the Israel Science Foundation (ISF), the main institution supporting competitive scientific research in Israel. Since 2023 he has served as Chair of the Executive Committee of the ISF.

Klafter served as the eighth president of Tel Aviv University, for two terms from 2009 to 2019, when he was succeeded by Ariel Porat. He also served as Chair of the Committee of University Heads of Israel (“VERA”) from 2017 to 2018.

During his tenure, Klafter oversaw the physical expansion of the Tel Aviv University campus and the development of international academic collaborations, including partnerships with Tsinghua University in China, institutions of higher education in India, and universities and research institutions in Europe and the US

As president of Tel Aviv University, Klafter championed the lowering of barriers among different disciplines and supported combined degree programs integrating engineering and humanities, aiming to produce graduates with both technical expertise and broader cultural perspectives.He also identified artificial intelligence, machine learning, sensors for autonomous vehicles, and smart cities as strategic research priorities for the university.

Since 2021 Klafter has served as Academic Chair of Tel Aviv Youth University, one of Israel’s largest centers working to nurture academic excellence among youth and bridge social gaps by making higher education accessible for all sectors of society.

== Research ==
Klafter’s research has focused on random processes in complex systems, strange kinetics and anomalous transport. His work on CTRW provided a foundational framework for describing random processes with broadly distributed waiting times and transport properties that depart from ordinary Brownian motion. His key contributions include:

Providing, together with Robert Silbey, the formal derivation of the Continuous-Time Random Walk Equation (CTRW), one of the central equations describing random motion. The derivation highlighted the possible space-time coupling in the CTRW that led later to the Lévy Walk process. (Klafter, J. & Silbey, R. “Derivation of the continuous-time random-walk.” Physical Review Letters, 44, 55, 1980.)

Introduction of the Lévy Walk process, together with Michael Shlesinger, as a new type of random walk that can lead to superdiffusion, by overcoming the problematic divergence characterizing Lévy Flights. Lévy Walks have since been observed in a broad range of research areas in physics, chemistry and biology. (Zaburdaev, V., Denisov, S. & Klafter, J. “Lévy walks.” Reviews of Modern Physics, 87, 483, 2015.)

Following the introduction of the Lévy Walk process, Klafter and Shlesinger conjectured that these walks were more efficient in finding hidden targets than simple diffusion. This opened a new field in search and foraging (Lévy foraging) with applications in biology and in planning search by robots. (Shlesinger, M. F. & Klafter, J. “Lévy flights vs. Lévy random walks.” In On Growth and Form, Springer, 1986.)

Introducing with Ralf Metzler and Eli Barkai the Fractional Fokker-Planck Equation that enabled the study of subdiffusion in the presence of an external potential. This was applied to the first experiment on the dynamics of a single enzyme that showed a new and unexpected behavior of active enzymes. (Metzler, R. & Klafter, J. “The random walk’s guide to anomalous diffusion: a fractional dynamics approach.” Physics Reports, 339, 1, 2000.)

He is the co-author with Igor Sokolov of the book First Steps in Random Walks: From Tools to Applications (Oxford University Press, 2011) and has published close to 400 scientific articles and edited 18 books. His published work has been widely cited in chemistry and Physics literature.

During his eight years at Exxon, his work on energy transport in molecular systems, transport in porous systems, and the origins of friction bridged industrial and fundamental research.

== Awards and honors ==
Klafter has received numerous scientific distinctions. In 1996 he received the Alexander von Humboldt Foundation Prize, and in 1999 the Weizmann Prize for Sciences. In 2003 he received the Kolthoff Award from the Technion – Israel Institute of Technology, followed by the Rothschild Prize in Chemistry in 2004 and the Israel Chemical Society Prize in 2005.

He was awarded the Beller Lectureship of the American Physical Society in 2010 and was elected an Honorary Member of the American Academy of Arts and Sciences in 2011. He is also a Fellow of the American Physical Society.

He was a Senior Fellow in the School of Soft Matter Research at the Freiburg Institute for Advanced Studies (FRIAS), University of Freiburg, from 2009 to 2011.

Klafter has received honorary doctorates from the Wrocław University of Technology in 2009 and from the Slovak Academy of Sciences 2018. He was also appointed an Honorary Professor of Tsinghua University in 2018 and received the distinction of Commander of the Order of the Star of Italy from the President of Italy.

An endowed professorship at Tel Aviv University, the Joseph Klafter chair of Biophysics, was named in his honor.

In 2020, Klafter was awarded the Israel Prize in Chemistry and Physics, Israel’s highest state honor for academic achievement. The prize committee recognized his contributions to the understanding of random processes in complex systems and to the dynamics of anomalous diffusion. The prize committee’s citation reads:

“The Israel Prize in Chemistry and Physics Research is awarded to Professor Joseph Klafter for his groundbreaking contributions to the dynamics of anomalous motion in a wide variety of systems in chemistry, physics, and biology. Professor Klafter developed the theoretical framework for describing motion that is accelerated or slowed relative to Einstein’s law of diffusion. Over the years, the enormous and universal importance of his work has become increasingly evident, as more and more systems can be comprehensively described using the methods he developed.”

In 2025, Klafter received the Israel Chemical Society Gold Medal, the highest honor awarded by the Israel Chemical Society.

== Selected publications ==
• Metzler, R. & Klafter, J. (2000). “The random walk’s guide to anomalous diffusion: a fractional dynamics approach.” Physics Reports, 339(1), 1–77. doi:10.1016/S0370-1573(00)00070-3. https://doi.org/10.1016/S0370-1573(00)00070-3

• Klafter, J. & Silbey, R. (1980). “Derivation of the continuous-time random-walk equation.” Physical Review Letters, 44(2), 55–58. doi:10.1103/PhysRevLett.44.55. https://doi.org/10.1103/PhysRevLett.44.55

• Zaburdaev, V., Denisov, S. & Klafter, J. (2015). “Lévy walks.” Reviews of Modern Physics, 87(2), 483–530. doi:10.1103/RevModPhys.87.483.

• M.F. Shlesinger, G.M. Zaslavsky & J. Klafter, “Strange Kinetics”, Nature 363, 31 1993.

• J. Klafter, M.F. Shlesinger & G. Zumofen, “Beyond Brownian Motion”, Physics Today 49(2), 33-39, 1996.

• J. Klafter and M.F. Shlesinger, “On the Relationship Among Three Theories of Relaxation in Disordered Systems”, Proc. Nat. Acad. Sci. (USA), 83 848-851 (1986).

• J. Klafter, A. Blumen and M.F. Shlesinger, “A Stochastic Pathway to Anomalous Diffusion”, Phys. Rev. A35, 3081-3085 (1987).

• R. Metzler, E. Barkai and J. Klafter, “Anomalous Diffusion and Relaxation Close to Thermal Equilibrium: A Fractional Fokker-Planck Equation Approach”, Phys. Rev. Lett. 82, 3563-3567 (1999).

• G. Zumofen and J. Klafter, “Scale Invariant Motion in Intermittent Chaotic Systems”, Phys. Rev. E47, 851-863 (1993).

• M. Magdziarz, A. Weron, K. Burnecki and J. Klafter, “Fractional Brownian Motion versus the Continuous Time Random Walk: A Simple Test for Subdiffusive Dynamics”, Phys. Rev. Lett. 103(18), 180602 (2009).^{.}

• A. Lubelski, I. M. Sokolov and J. Klafter, “Nonergodicity Mimics Inhomogeneity in Single Particle Tracking”, Phys. Rev. Lett. 100(25), 250602 (2008).
