= Ariel Porat =

President of the Tel Aviv University

- אריאל פורת
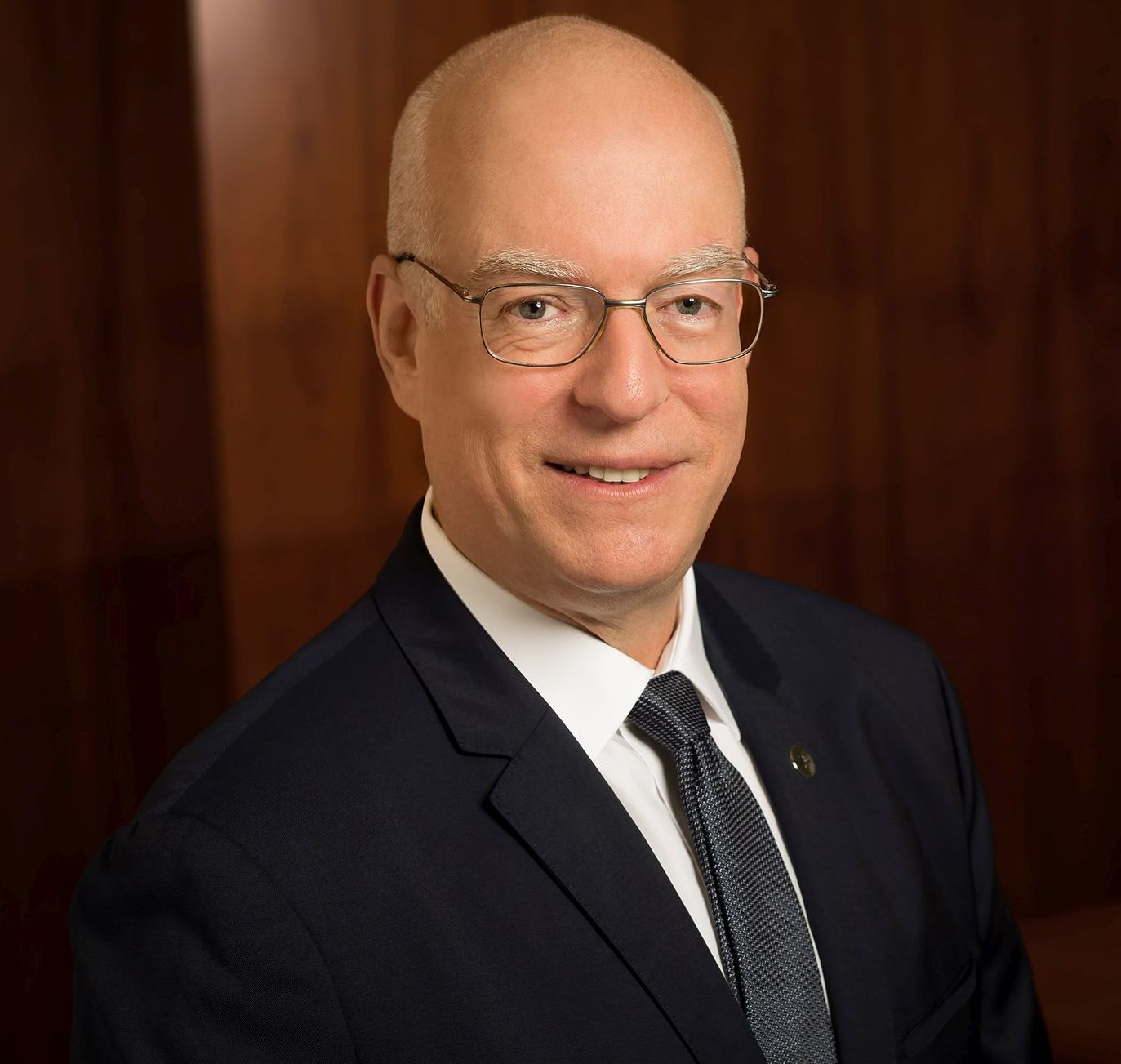
- Born: November 1, 1956 (age 69); Tel Aviv, Israel
- Education: Tel Aviv University; Yale University
- Employer: Tel Aviv University
- Title: President
- Awards: The EMET Prize for Art, Science and Culture

Ariel Porat (Hebrew: אריאל פורת; born November 1, 1956) is the president of Tel Aviv University (TAU), a full professor and former dean at TAU's Buchmann Faculty of Law. Until his appointment as president, he was a distinguished visiting professor of law at the University of Chicago Law School. He is a member of the Israel Academy of Sciences and Humanities, incumbent of the Alain Poher Chair in Private Law at TAU, the recipient of The EMET Prize for Art, Science and Culture and the recipient of the European Law and Economics Association Award for Lifetime Achievements in Law and Economics.

== Biography ==
Ariel Porat was born in Tel Aviv. His father, Haim Porat, served as VP of the District Court of Tel Aviv, and his mother, Adina Porat, was a judge at the National Labor Court. Porat served for five years in the Israel Defense Forces' Israeli Intelligence Corps and holds the rank of major (reserve). Completing his LLB with distinction (1979–1983) at Tel Aviv University, he went on to a direct-track JSD (1989), followed by a visiting scholar position (1989–90), at Yale University.

== Legal and academic career ==
In 1990, Porat joined TAU's Buchmann Faculty of Law. He specializes in torts, contracts and economic analysis of the law, and is the incumbent of the Alain Poher Chair in Private Law. From 2002 to 2006 he served as dean of the faculty. From 2003 until his nomination as president of TAU in 2019, Porat was Fischel-Neil Distinguished Visiting Professor at the University of Chicago Law School, with additional visiting professor positions at Stanford, NYU, Columbia University, UC Berkeley, and the University of Toronto. He is a member of the American Law Institute, former president of the Israeli Law and Economics Association, and former Board member of the American Law and Economics Association (2008–11).

Porat founded and edited (2000-2003) Theoretical Inquiries in Law, an international law journal ranked second in the world in the area of Jurisprudence and Legal Theory by Washington and Lee Law Journal Rankings.

From 1997 to 2002, he headed the Cegla Center for Interdisciplinary Research of the Law at the Buchmann Faculty of Law. In 2013, Porat was appointed head of TAU's Strategic Steering Committee, tasked with examining possible changes in the university's academic structure and management. The Committee's recommendations were adopted and implemented by TAU.

In June 2014, Porat was elected member of the Israel Academy of Sciences and Humanities. Other honors include the European Law and Economics Association Award for Lifetime Achievements in Law and Economics (2020); EMET Prize for Legal Research (2014); Zeltner Prize for Legal Research (2012); Shneor Zalman Cheshin Award for Academic Excellence in Law (2010); Zusman Prize for Young Scholars and the Knight of Quality Government Award by The Movement for Quality Government in Israel.

In 2020, the European Association of Law and Economics gave Porat the prestigious EALE Award for lifetime achievement.

=== Tenure as president of Tel Aviv University ===
In May 2019, Porat was elected 9th president of Tel Aviv University, succeeding Joseph Klafter. In May 2024, he was re-elected for a second five-year term.

== Selected publications ==
- Personalized Law: Different Rules for Different People (Oxford University Press, 2021) (with O. Ben-Shahar).
- Getting Incentives Right: Torts, Contracts, and Restitution (Princeton University Press, 2013) (with R. Cooter).
- The Economics of Remedies (editor) (Edward Elgar Publishing Ltd., series eds., Richard Posner and Francesco Parisi, 2012).
- Fault in American Contract Law (Cambridge University Press, 2010, ed. with O. Ben-Shahar).
- Tort Liability under Uncertainty (Oxford University Press, 2001) (with A. Stein).
- Torts Vol. 1 (The Harry and Michael Sacher Institute for Legislative Research and Comparative Law, 2013).
- Contributory Negligence Defense in Contract Law (The Harry and Michael Sacher Institute for Legislative Research and Comparative Law, 1997).
