= Mark Shtaif =

- מרק שטייף
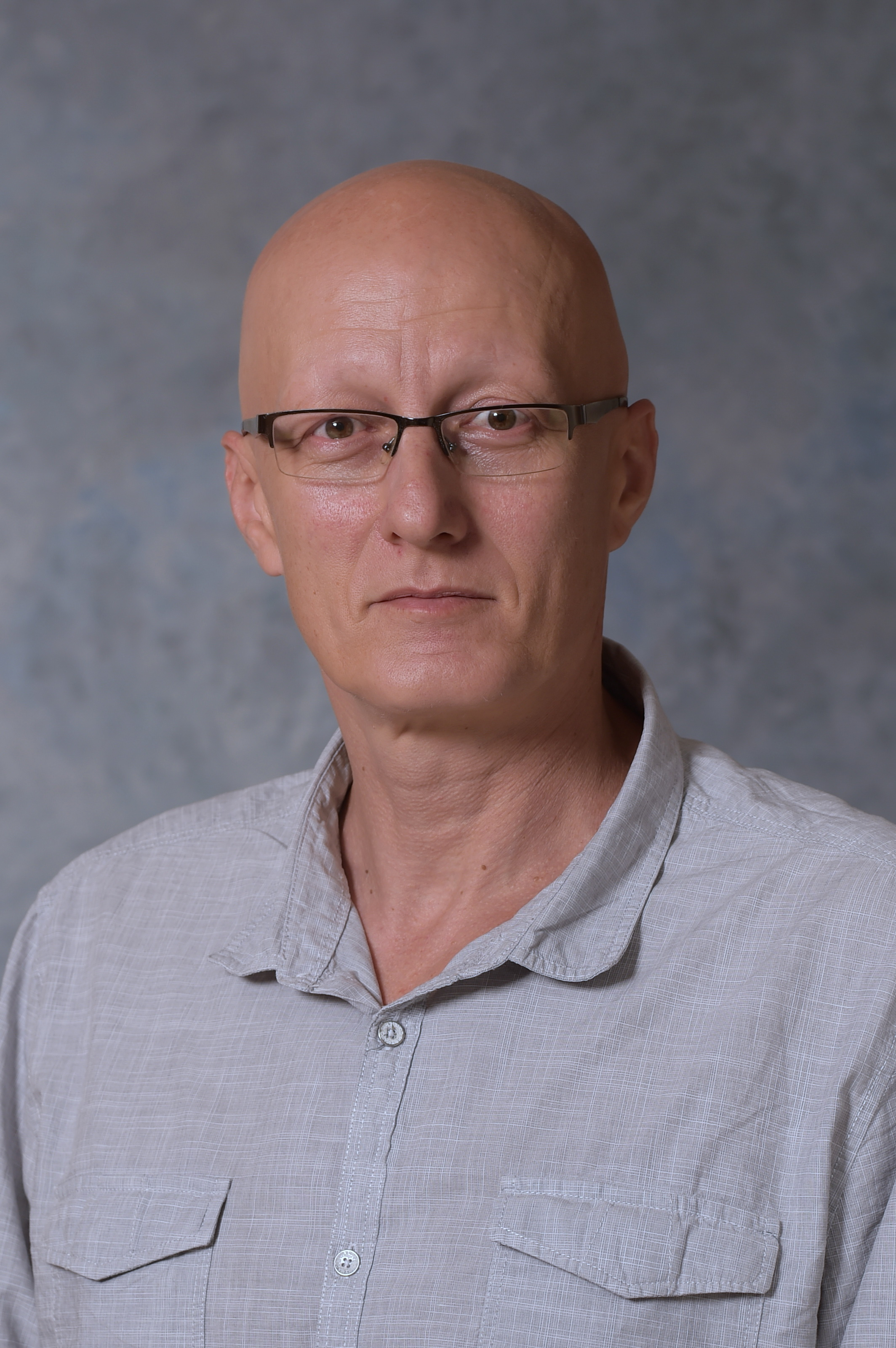
- Born: April 21, 1966 (age 60); Chișinău, Soviet Union
- Scientific career
- Education: Technion – Israel Institute of Technology
- Fields: Electrical engineering, Information and Communications Technology
- Workplaces: Tel Aviv University, AT&T

Mark Shtaif (Hebrew: מרק שטייף) is an Israeli communication scientist, and a professor of electrical engineering at the faculty of engineering of Tel Aviv University. As of October 2020, he serves as Tel Aviv University’s rector.

== Biography ==
=== Early life ===
Mark Shtaif was born in 1966 in Kishinev of the former USSR. His father Abraham was an engineer of agricultural machinery and his mother Tania worked as a pediatrician. His family immigrated to Israel in April 1973 when he was 7 years old.

=== Education and career ===
After graduating from the Reali high-school in Haifa, and following a mandatory military service, he completed the bachelor, masters and doctorate degrees in electrical engineering at the Technion in 1997 and joined the light-wave research lab of AT&T in Red Bank NJ. His initial position at AT&T was of a post-doctoral fellow, but he was soon promoted to the position of a senior and subsequently principal member of technical staff and specialized on the theoretical modeling of fiber communications systems. In 2000 he assumed the position of a principal architect at a newly established optical communication start-up named Celion Networks. Later in 2002 he joined Tel Aviv University’s faculty of engineering, where he has been teaching and conducting research ever since.

His fields of research focus primarily on fiber optics and optical communication systems. Within this general area of activity he integrates the fields of optics, quantum theory, nonlinear systems, communications theory, information theory, and signal processing. Over the years he has contributed to a variety of topics including optical amplification, analysis of nonlinear propagation, polarization-related phenomena, analyses of noise and signal detection, quantum information in fiber systems, and fundamental limits to optical communications.

In the years 2014 – 2017 he headed the department of Physical Electronics within the School of Electrical Engineering in Tel Aviv University, and in 2017 – 2020 he was the head of the entire school. In October 2020 he was appointed rector of Tel Aviv University.

=== Personal life ===
Mark Shtaif is married to Michal, an educational councilor. They have three children and reside in the town of Even Yehuda.
