= Moshe Zviran =

Israeli professor

- משה צבירן
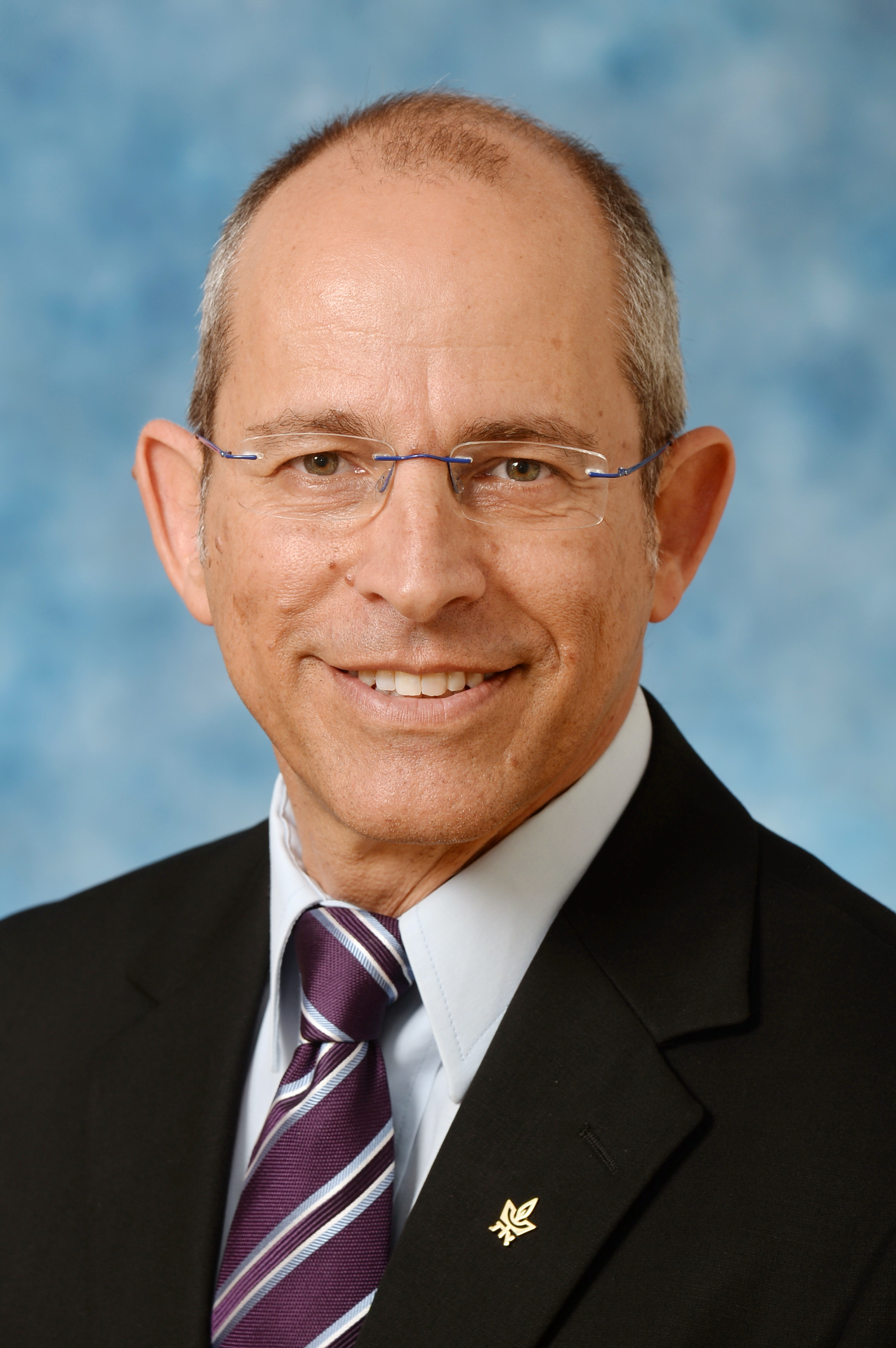
- Born: 1955 (age 70–71); Tel Aviv, Israel
- Education: Tel Aviv University
- Scientific career
- Fields: Management
- Institutions: Tel Aviv University
- Thesis: (1988)

Moshe Zviran (Hebrew: משה צבירן; born: 1955) is a professor at the Coller School of Management at Tel Aviv University. He is Chief Entrepreneurship and Innovation Officer of Tel Aviv University, and the Head and Academic Director of the Bloomberg-Sagol Center for City Leadership at Tel Aviv University. He is the founder of “The Zviran Index” for comparative compensation and benefits surveys in Israel.

== Early life and education ==
Zviran was born and raised in Tel Aviv. He attended Arnon elementary school and the science-electronics track at the Ironi Dalet High School. He was recruited into the Israel Defense Forces (IDF) in 1973 and served in the Air Force. He completed a B.Sc. in mathematics and computer sciences (1979) and an M.Sc. in management sciences with a specialization in information systems (1982) at Tel Aviv University. During his studies he worked in information systems for a number of organizations, advancing to managerial positions in the area. In 1984, he began his doctoral studies at Tel Aviv University's Faculty of Management and in 1988 he received his PhD in the management of information systems.

== Career ==
In 1988, after receiving his Ph.D., Zviran joined the U.S. Naval Postgraduate School in Monterey, California. as a faculty member in the area of management sciences and information systems. He returned to Israel in 1992, where he was first a faculty member in the Department of Information Systems Engineering at Ben-Gurion University of the Negev, and starting in 1994, in the Faculty of Management at Tel Aviv University.

Since then, he has also held positions at Tel Aviv University, including head of the Management of Technology and Information Program, head of the Marcel and Annie Adams Institute for Management Information Systems, academic director of the MBA program in Management of Technology, Innovation and Entrepreneurship, director of the Eli Hurvitz Institute for Strategic Management, Associate Dean of the Coller School of Management (2007-2014), and Dean of the School during 2014–2022. He is the incumbent of the Isaac Gilinski Chair of Entrepreneurship, Technology, Innovation and Management, which engages in research relating to the management of technology, innovation and entrepreneurship on issues of interest from the global perspective. He has also for several years been a visiting professor at the Center for Information Systems & Technology at the Claremont Graduate University in California. In parallel with his academic activity, he is a consultant in the area of strategic management as well as on issues of executive compensation. He has been on a number of boards of directors of private and publicly traded companies.

== Publications ==
Zviran has published dozens of scientific articles on the management of information system and information system security and two books: Management Information Systems, co-authored with Niv Ahituv and Seev Neumann (1996), and Information Systems: From Theory to Practice, co-authored with Seev Neumann (2001).

== Research ==
Zviran specializes in the area of alternative passwords. He and his research colleague William Haga were among the pioneers of research on multi-level protection of information systems and on the characteristics of usefulness versus password strength. Together they developed and launched the cognitive passwords approach, which is widely used today as a second line of defense in a wide range of systems and applications.

== The Zviran Index ==
In 1984, parallel to his academic career, Zviran established the Zviran Index in partnership with Elad Systems. The index is based on comparative salary and benefits surveys in the area of information systems in Israel, and is a managerial tool for organizations. In 1989, together with his wife, Rachel, he acquired the share of Elad Systems and established a new company - Zviran Consulting and Surveys. With the rapid development of the hi-tech industry in Israel, Zviran expanded the areas covered by the salary and benefits surveys to technology and hi-tech companies and later to additional areas, including consumer goods, pharma, infrastructure and construction, and more. The company also engaged in consulting projects throughout the world, on a broad range of issues in the area of compensation. In 2012 Zviran and his wife sold the ownership of the company. The company still bears the name Zviran but Zviran is not a shareholder and is not involved in its activities.
