= Nadav Ahituv =

Israeli-American researcher

Nadav Ahituv (Hebrew: נדב אחיטוב) is the Director for the Institute for Human Genetics at the University of California, San Francisco (USCF). He is also a Professor in the Department of Bioengineering and Therapeutic Sciences and leads the Ahituv Lab at University of California, San Francisco (USCF).

== Early life and education ==
Ahituv received his PhD with distinction in human genetics from Tel-Aviv University, where he worked on hereditary hearing loss.

== Research ==
Ahituv developed cis-regulation therapy (CRT) for genetic diseases that are caused due to changes in gene dosage and adipose manipulation transplantation (AMT) that engineers fat cells and implants them for therapeutic benefits.

The Ahituv Lab investigates gene regulatory elements and their relationship to human diversity and disease. His lab also focuses on identifying gene regulatory elements and linking nucleotide variation within them to various phenotypes, including morphological differences between species, drug response, and human disease. The lab is one of the developers of massively parallel reporter assays (MPRAs) that allow for high-throughput functional characterization of gene regulatory elements.

== Awards and honors ==
In 2014, Ahituv received the ASCPT Leon I. Goldberg young investigator award from The American Society for Clinical Pharmacology and Therapeutics. In 2024, Ahituv received the Scientific Achievement Award from The American Society of Human Genetics (ASHG).
