= Tel Aviv University =

Public university in Israel

- אוניברסיטת תל אביב (Hebrew)
- Motto: בעקבות הלא נודע (Hebrew)
- Motto in English: Pursuing the Unknown
- Type: Public research
- Established: 1956; 70 years ago
- Endowment: US$1 billion (2026)
- President: Ariel Porat
- Rector: Mark Shtaif
- Principal: Mordechai Kohen
- Vice presidents: Milette Shamir; Raanan Rein; Dan Peer; Amos Elad
- Faculty: 1847
- Undergraduates: 15,285 (2019)
- Postgraduates: 11,098 (2019)
- Doctoral students: 2,143 (2019)
- Location: Tel Aviv, Israel; 32°06′45″N 34°48′18″E
- Campus: 220 acres (89 ha); Urban
- Language: Hebrew, English
- Colors: Black and white
- Website: tau.ac.il

Tel Aviv University (Note: Hebrew: אוּנִיבֶרְסִיטַת תֵּל אָבִיב, romanized: Universitat Tel Aviv) (TAU) is a public research university in Tel Aviv, Israel. With over 30,000 students, it is the largest frontal learning university in the country. Located in northwest Tel Aviv, the university is the center of teaching and research of the city, comprising 9 faculties, 17 teaching hospitals, 18 performing arts centers, 27 schools, 106 departments, 340 research centers, and 400 laboratories.

Tel Aviv University originated in 1956 when three education units merged to form the university. The original 69-hectare (170-acre) campus was expanded and now makes up 89 hectares (220 acres) in Tel Aviv's Northwest District.

== History ==
TAU's origins date back to 1956, when three research institutes: the Tel Aviv School of Law and Economics (established in 1935), the Institute of Natural Sciences (established in 1931), and the Academic Institute of Jewish Studies (established in 1954) – joined to form Tel Aviv University. Initially operated by the Tel Aviv municipality, the university was granted autonomy in 1963, and George S. Wise was its first president, from that year until 1971. The main campus, covering an area of 170-acre (0.69 km^{2}) was established that same year. Its succeeding presidents have been Yuval Ne'eman from 1971 to 1977, Haim Ben-Shahar from 1977 to 1983, Moshe Many from 1983 to 1991, Yoram Dinstein from 1991 to 1999, Itamar Rabinovich from 1999 to 2006, Zvi Galil from 2006 to 2009, Joseph Klafter from 2009 to 2019, and Ariel Porat since 2019.

The university also maintains academic supervision over the Center for Technological Design in Holon, the New Academic College of Tel Aviary, and the Afeka College of Engineering in Tel Aviv. The Wise Observatory is located in Mitzpe Ramon in the Negev desert.

In October 2023 the university launched the "Erez" program, in which around 200 candidates for Israel Defense Forces combat officer positions complete bachelor's degrees in the humanities and social sciences before beginning officers' training.

This university lies on part of the land of the Palestinian village Al-Shaykh Muwannis, which was abandoned in March 1948 due to the threats of Jewish militias.

== Academic units ==
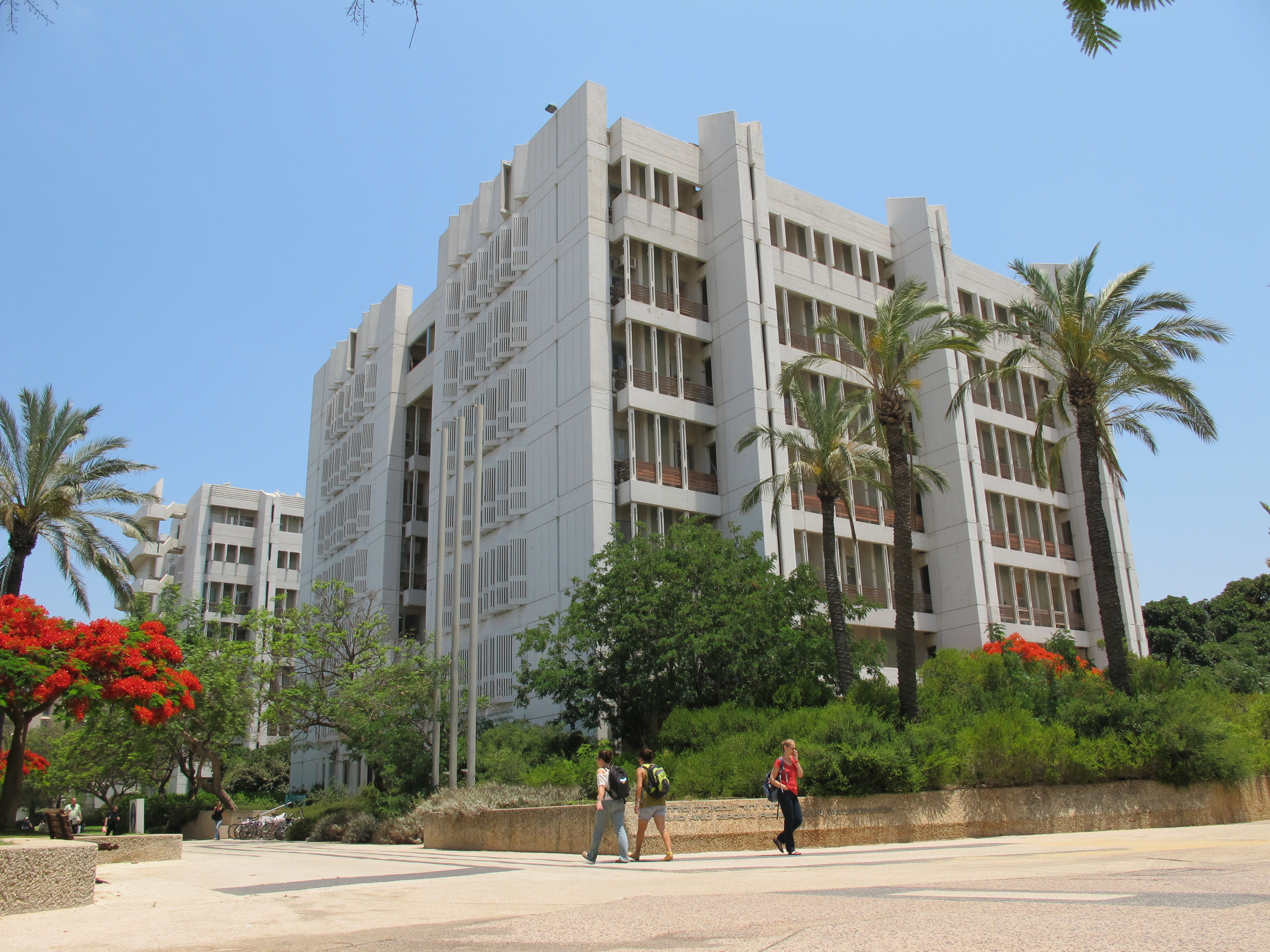
Life Sciences Building

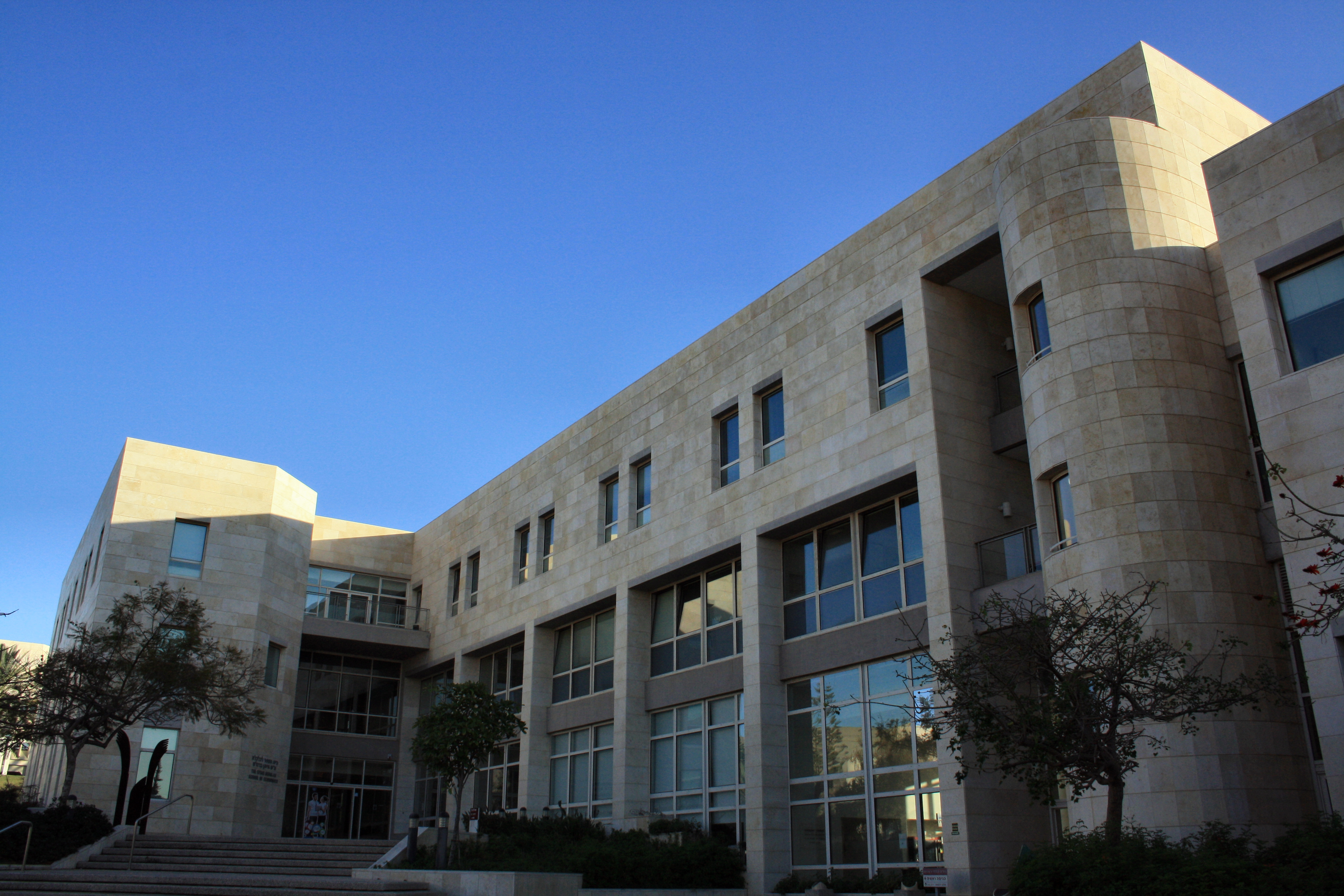
School of Economics

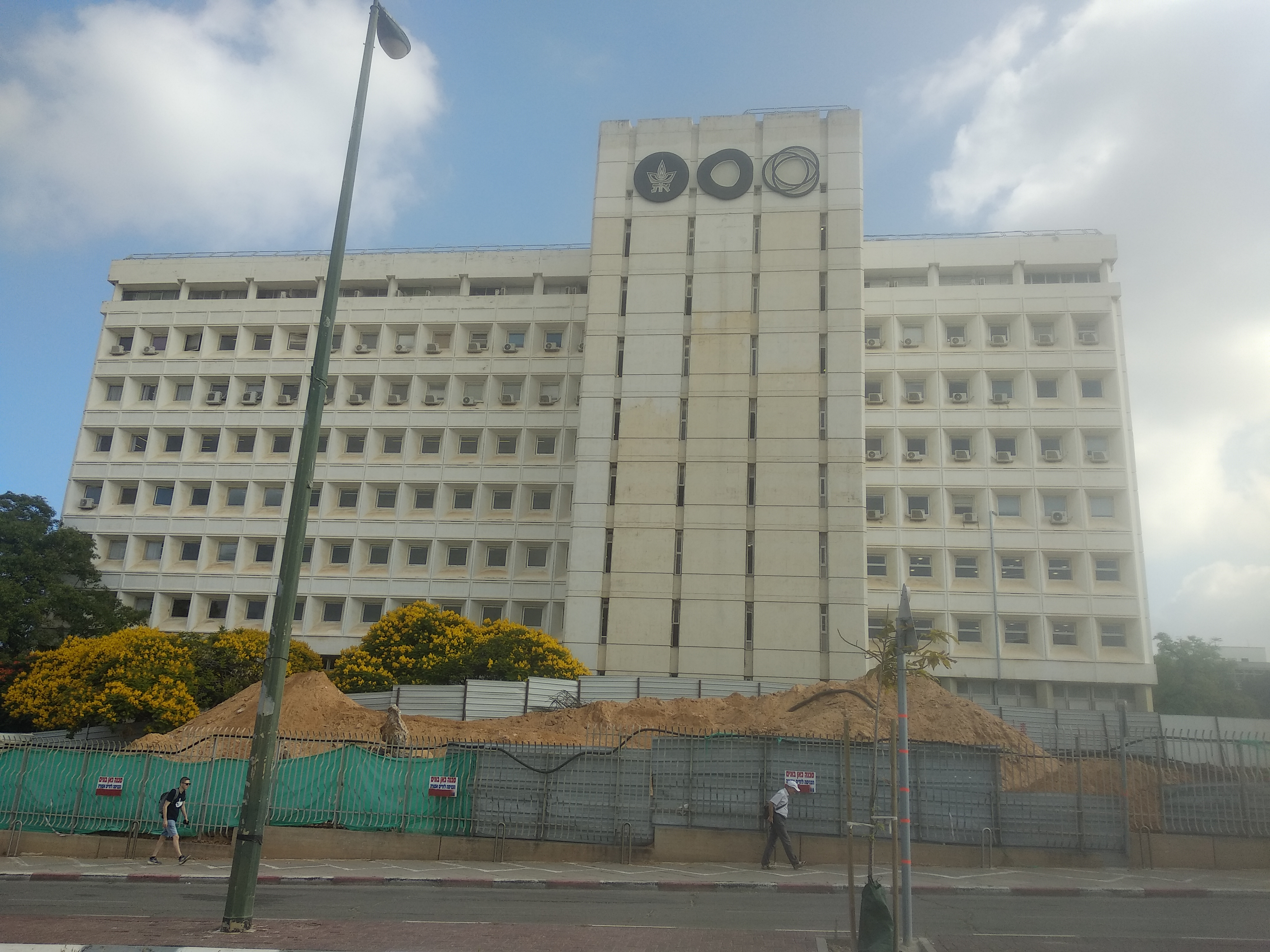
Social Sciences Building

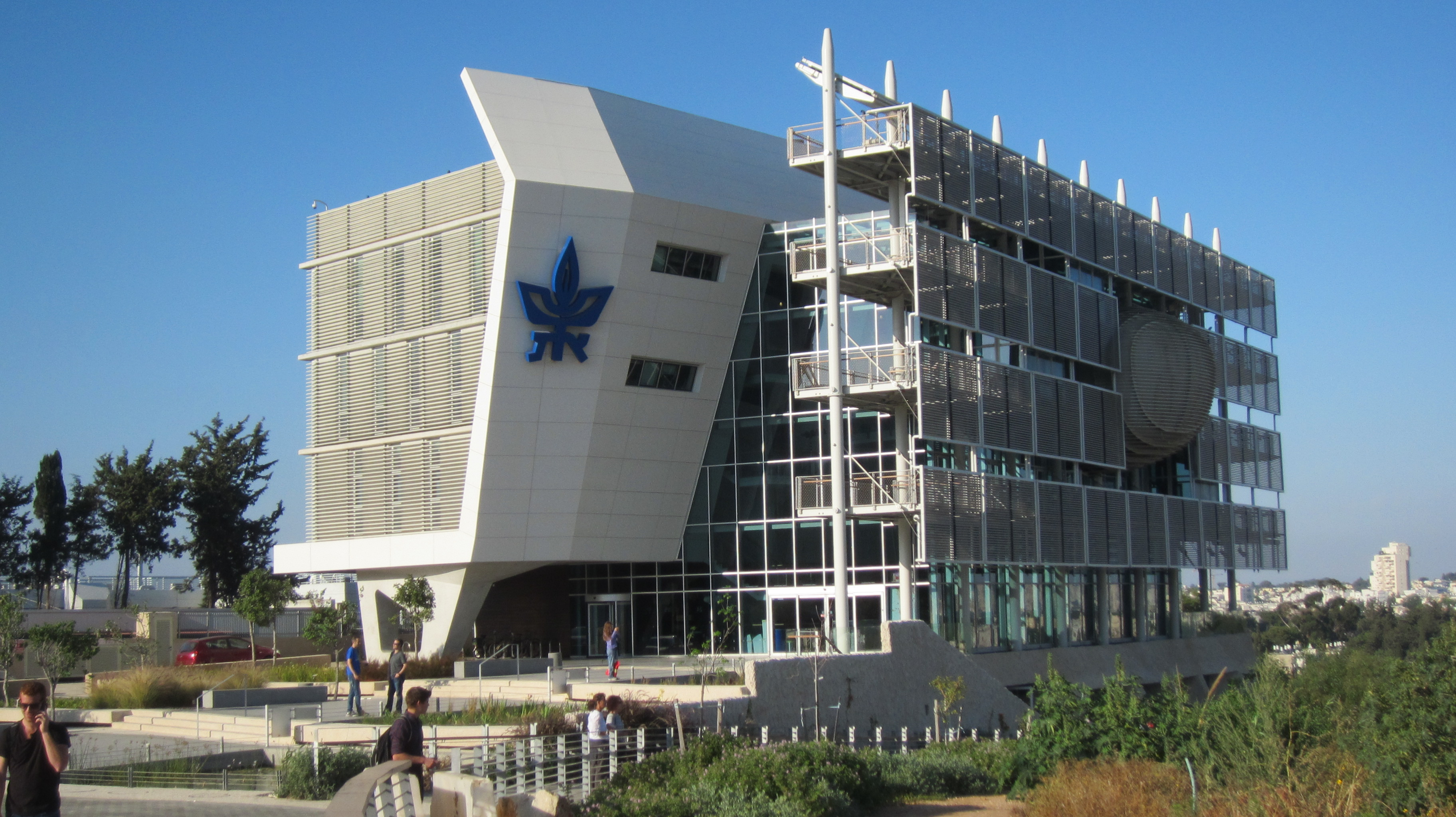
Environmental Studies Building

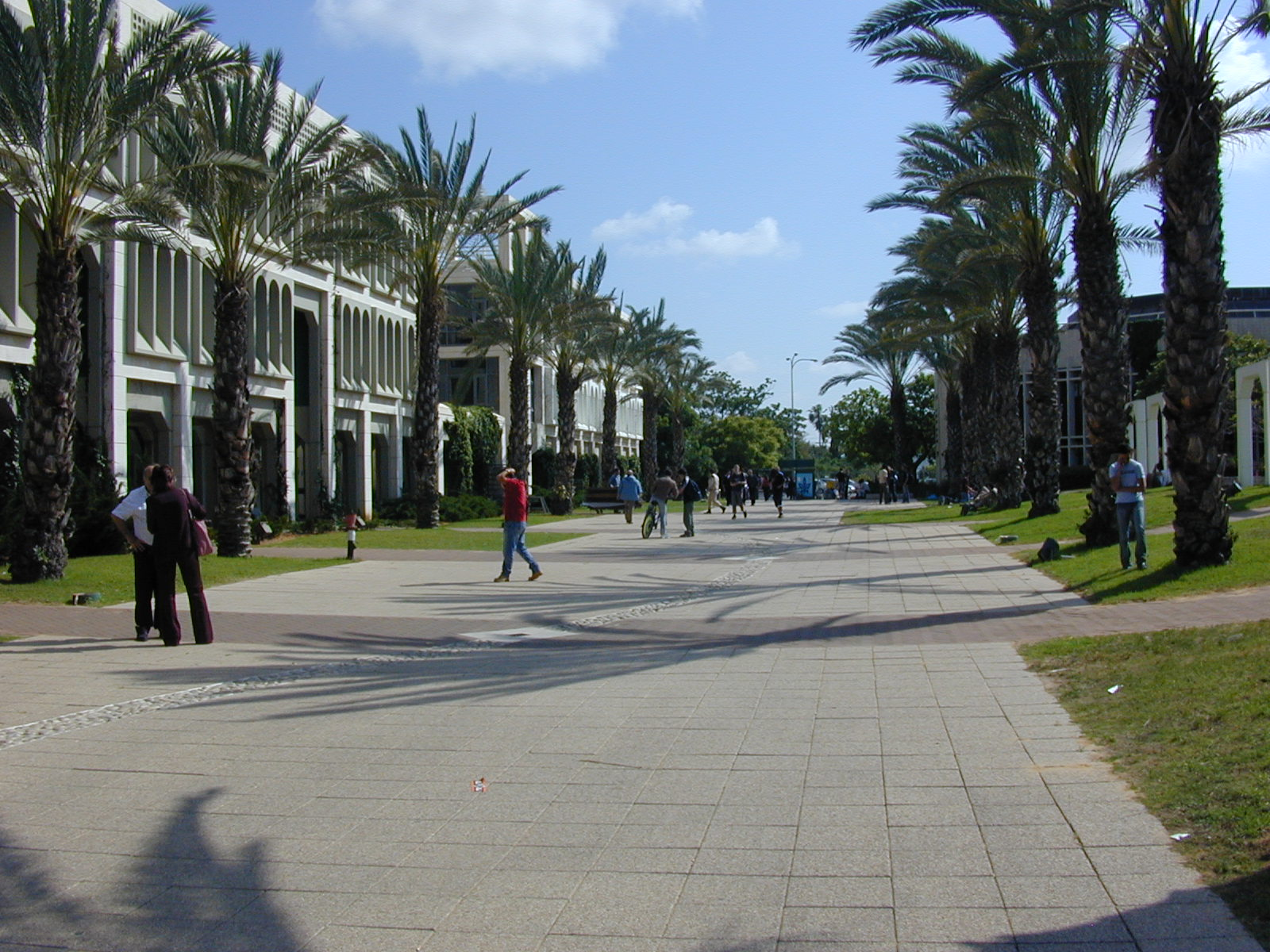
Leigh Engineering Faculty Boulevard

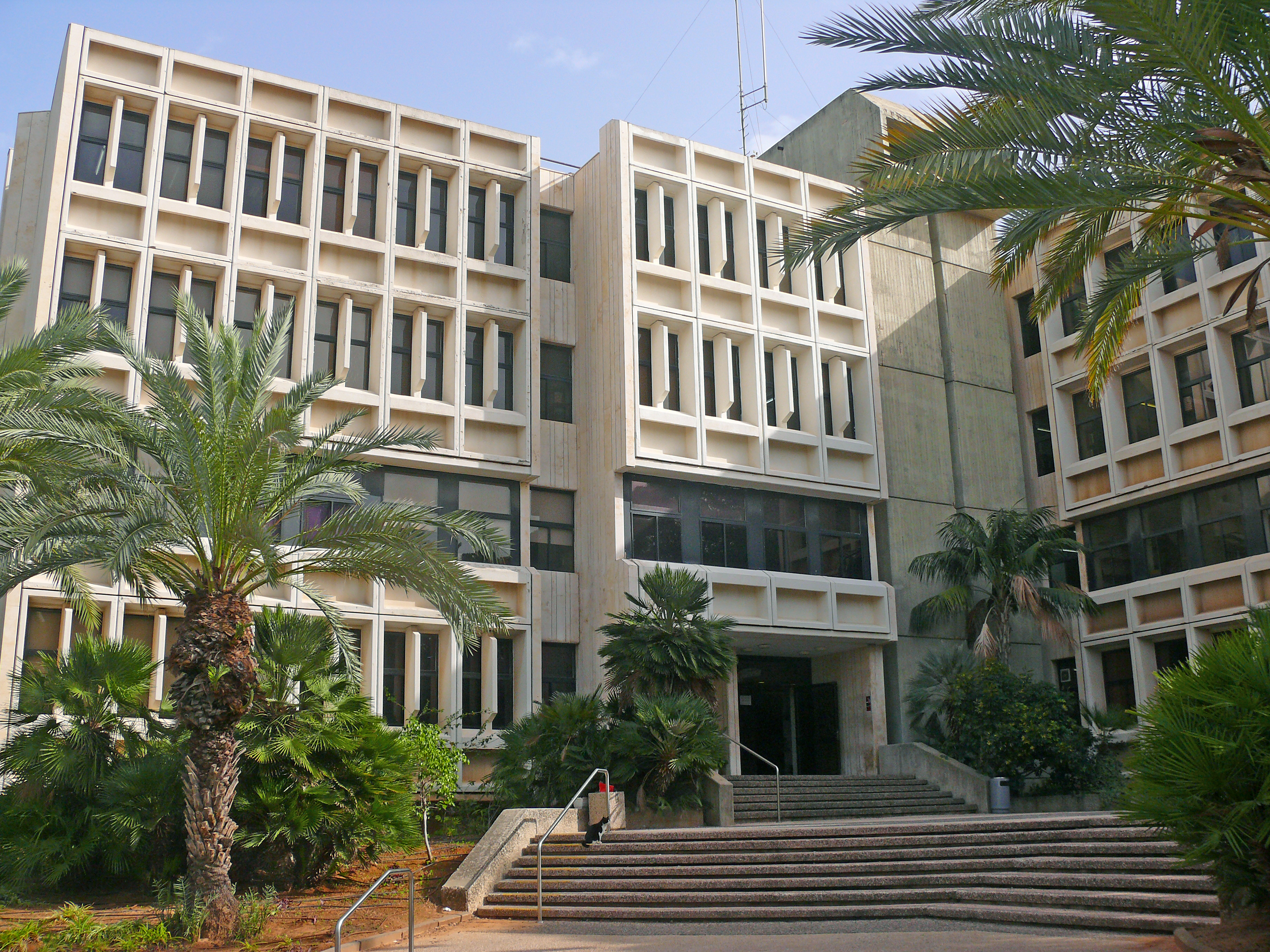
The Vladimir Schreiber Institute of Mathematics

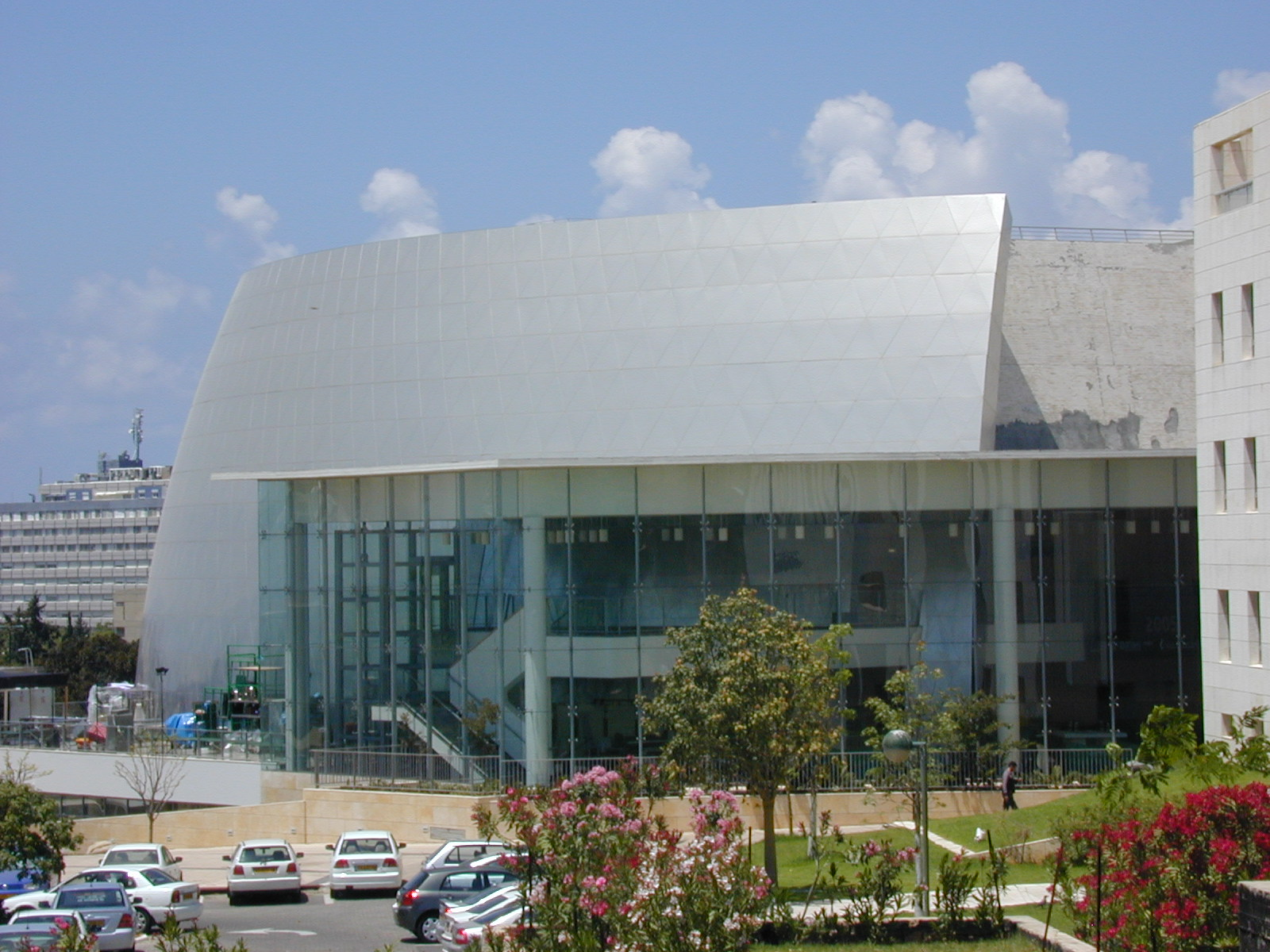
Smolarz Auditorium

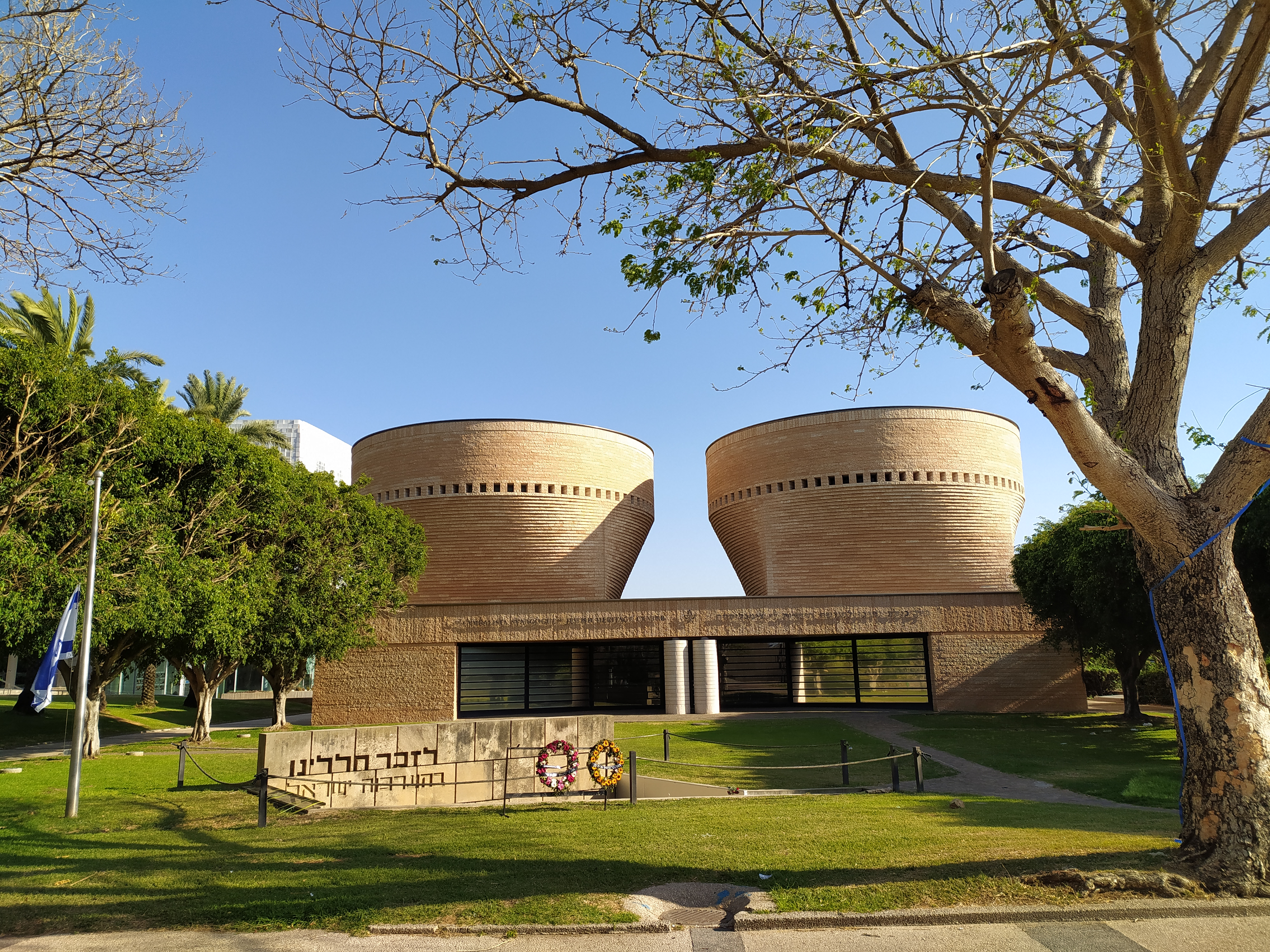
Cymbalista Synagogue and Jewish Heritage Center

Faculties

- Katz Faculty of the Arts
- Fleischman Faculty of Engineering
- Sackler Faculty of Exact Sciences
- Entin Faculty of Humanities
- Buchmann Faculty of Law
- Wise Faculty of Life Sciences
- Gray Faculty of Medical and Health Sciences (formerly the Sackler Faculty of Medicine)
- Gordon Faculty of Social Sciences
- Boris Mints Institute
- Coller School of Management

Independent schools

- Berglas School of Economics
- Porter School of Environmental Studies
- Buchmann-Mehta School of Music
- David Azrieli School of Architecture
- Goldschleger School of Dental Medicine
- Miller School of Education
- Shapell School of Social Work
- TAU International (formerly the School for Overseas Students)
- Sagol School of Neuroscience

=== Institutes and centers ===
Tel Aviv University has over 130 research institutes and centers.

== The Lowy International School ==
In addition to being Tel Aviv University's home for international researchers, visitors and partnerships, The Lowy International School (formerly TAU International) annually affords thousands of students from across the globe the opportunity to study at Tel Aviv University. The school is overseen by Milette Shamir, the university's vice president of international affairs.

The school's full name is The Lowy International School in Memory of Shirley Lowy; the name changed in 2022 following an $18-million gift from Australian-Israeli businessperson Sir Frank Lowy. Lady Shirley Lowy, Sir Frank's wife, died on December 9, 2020.

School programs are primarily conducted in English, though The Lowy International School also offers immersion options for studying in Hebrew. Programs include undergraduate, graduate, study abroad, research, gap year and short-term programs, and the school provides a variety of scholarships. Students in the B.A., M.A., exchange and study abroad programs are given the option of housing at the Einstein or Broshim dorms, just outside the university.

Undergraduate programs:

- International B.A. in Liberal Arts and Humanities
- International B.A. in Management and Liberal Arts
- B.Mus. at the Buchmann-Mehta School of Music
- Programme de Licence en Sciences Sociales, Politiques et Économiques
- Dual Degree B.A. Program in Liberal Arts: TAU & Columbia University
- Collaborative B.A. with Yeshiva University

Graduate programs:

- M.A. in Ancient Israel Studies
- M.Sc. in Biomedical Engineering
- M.A. in Conflict Resolution and Mediation
- M.A. in Cyber Politics & Government
- M.Sc. in Digital Health
- M.D.M in Disaster Management
- M.F.A. in Documentary Cinema
- M.Sc. in Environmental Engineering
- M.A. in Environmental Studies
- M.Sc. in Life Sciences
- M.Sc. in Medical Sciences
- M.Sc. in Neuroscience
- M.Sc. in Plant Sciences with Emphasis in Food Security
- M.A. in Security and Diplomacy
- M.A. in Social and Policy Aspects of Climate Change
- M.A. in Sustainable Development
- M.A. Teaching English to Speakers of Other Languages (TESOL)
- Sofaer Global MBA
- M.Mus. at the Buchmann-Mehta School of Music
- International LL.M. Program – Parasol Foundation
- Johns Hopkins University SAIS and TAU Collaborative Program
- Sciences Po Lille University and TAU Collaborative Program
- TAU-Thapar 3+2 Integrated Degree in Biotechnology or Electrical Engineering

Lowy Distinguished Guest Professors:

Created in 2023, the Lowy Distinguished Guest Professors program brings eminent academics to Tel Aviv University.

- Reinhard Genzel, Nobel laureate in physics
- Eitan Tadmor, mathematician
- Milette Gaifman, classicist
- Michael Waidner, computer scientist
- Rudolf Podgornik, physicist
- Susan B. Davidson, computer scientist
- Alberto Melloni, historian
- Olga Sorkine-Hornung, computer scientist

== Rankings ==
University rankings

Global – Overall
- ARWU World: 201–300 (2024)
- CWTS World: 84 (2024)
- QS World: 223 (2026)
- THE World: 201–250 (2025)
- USNWR Global: 199 (2025)

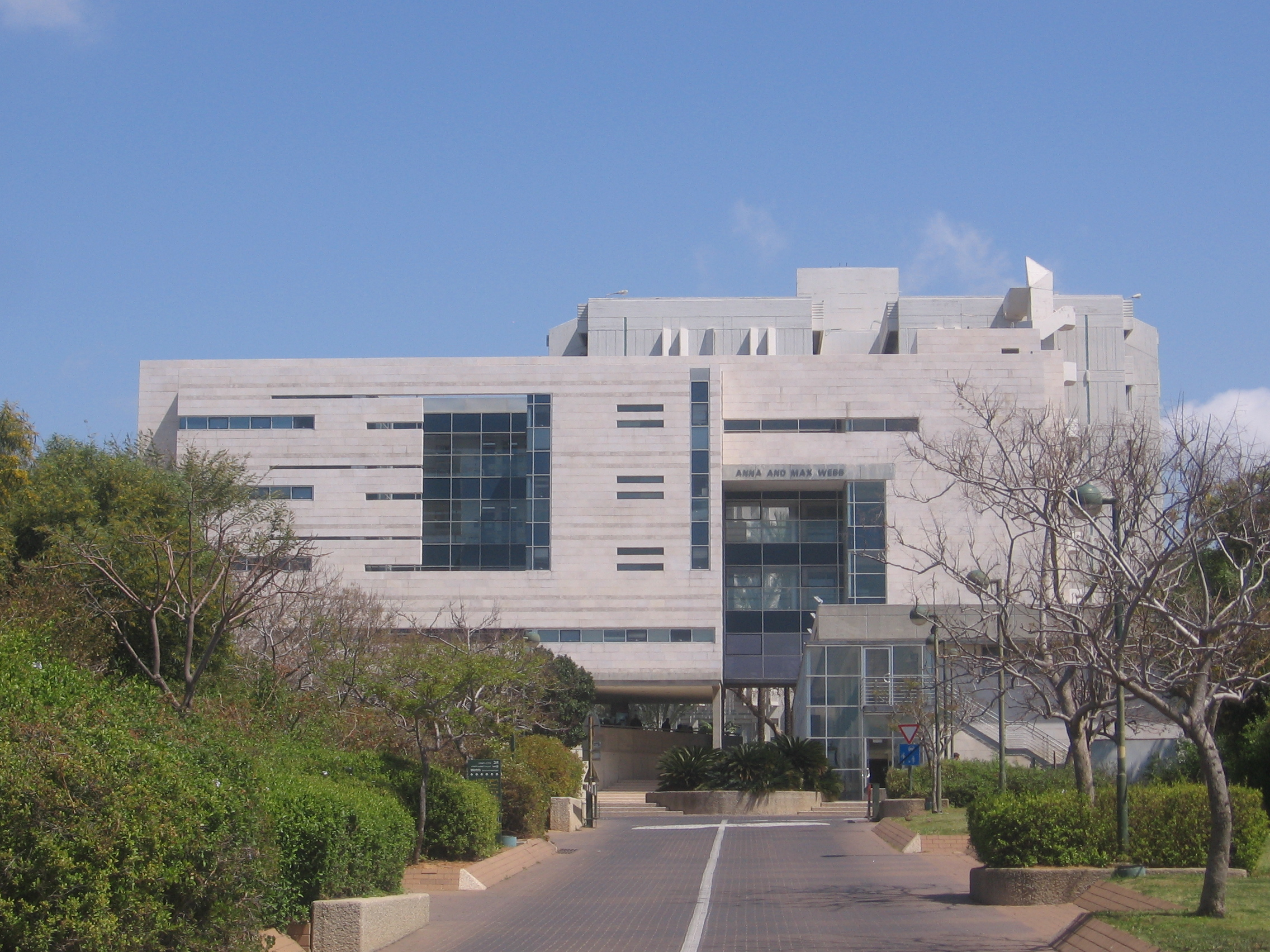
The Webb school of languages in Tel Aviv University

In 2024 QS World University Rankings ranked Tel Aviv University 214th in the world, making it the highest ranked university in Israel. In 2016, its subject rankings were: 202nd in Arts and Humanities, 295th in Engineering and Technology, 193rd in Life Sciences and Medicine, 208th in Natural Science, and 240th in Social Sciences and Management.

The Center for World University Rankings ranked Tel Aviv University 81st in the world and third in Israel in its 2016 CWUR World University Rankings. They have also ranked it as 56 in 2012.

The Times Higher Education World University Rankings for 2019 placed Tel Aviv University at 189th in the world. The ratings reflect an overall measure of esteem that combines data on the institutions' reputation for research and teaching.

In 2016 QS World University Rankings ranked Tel Aviv University 22nd in the world for citations per faculty, which is the indicator that measures a university's research impact. This makes Tel Aviv University the leading university in Israel in terms of research.

In 2015 the Academic Ranking of World Universities gave Tel Aviv University the following subject rankings: 20th in Computer Science, 51–75 in Mathematics, 76–100 in Physics and 76–100 Economics/Business. In 2016 it was ranked as 51–75 in Engineering.

From the year 2007 until 2018, Tel Aviv university ranks as 35th in the world in Computer Science according to CSRankings, the same rank as Harvard and the second-highest ranked in Israel.

As of 2021, it is ranked as the 191st best university in the world by THE World University Rankings, 230th by the QS World University Rankings and in the 151–200th bracket by the Shanghai Rankings

In 2022, PitchBook Data ranked Tel Aviv University 7th in the world in terms of number of alumni who have founded venture capital-backed companies, the highest out of any university outside the United States.

== Relations with other universities ==
Currently, Tel Aviv University partners with more than 280 academic institutions spanning 46 countries. The university's academic partnerships are supported by The Lowy International School. Types of international partnerships include: joint research centers, research collaborations, joint CFPs for research seed funding, joint or dual degrees, jointly taught courses, joint summer/winter schools, joint post-doctoral fellowships, exchange programs, study abroad programs and visiting faculty opportunities.

The Tel Aviv University Faculty of Law has exchange agreements with 36 overseas universities, including: University of Virginia, Cornell University, Boston University, UCLA, Bucerius (Germany), EBS (Germany), McGill (Canada), Osgoode Hall (Canada), Ottawa (Canada), Queens University (Queens), Toronto (Canada), Bergen (Norway), STL (China), KoGuan (China), Tsinghua (China), Jindal Global (India), University of Hong Kong, Singapore Management University, Stockholm University (Sweden), Monash (Australia), Sydney (Australia), Sciences Po (France), Seoul (South Korea), Lucern (Switzerland), Buenos Aires (Argentina), Bocconi (Italy) and Madrid (Spain).

The Coller School of Management has exchange agreements with over 100 overseas universities. The Coller Exchange Program is open to MBA/MSc/MA students and qualified professionals. The school offers a wide variety of courses for its visiting students in strategy, entrepreneurship, finance-accounting, marketing, organizational behavior, decisions and operations research, technology and information systems. The program also offers courses from other TAU schools on Israeli Culture, History, Economics and more.

In 2013, Tel Aviv University and Ruppin Academic Center jointly created a study center at the Mediterranean Sea, where students will undertake advanced studies of issues impacting the coastal environment and its resources.

In 2026, researchers at Tel Aviv University worked with researchers at Stanford University to create a model for AI to teach itself without human intervention.

=== International cooperation ===
In Germany, Tel Aviv University cooperates with the Goethe-University in Frankfurt/Main. Both cities are linked by a long-lasting partnership agreement.

== Publications ==
- Tel Aviv (journal), peer-reviewed international journal of archaeology in the Levant and the history and culture of Near Eastern civilizations, with a focus on biblical and protohistoric periods and also dealing with the classical and prehistoric periods

== TAU Ventures ==
TAU Ventures
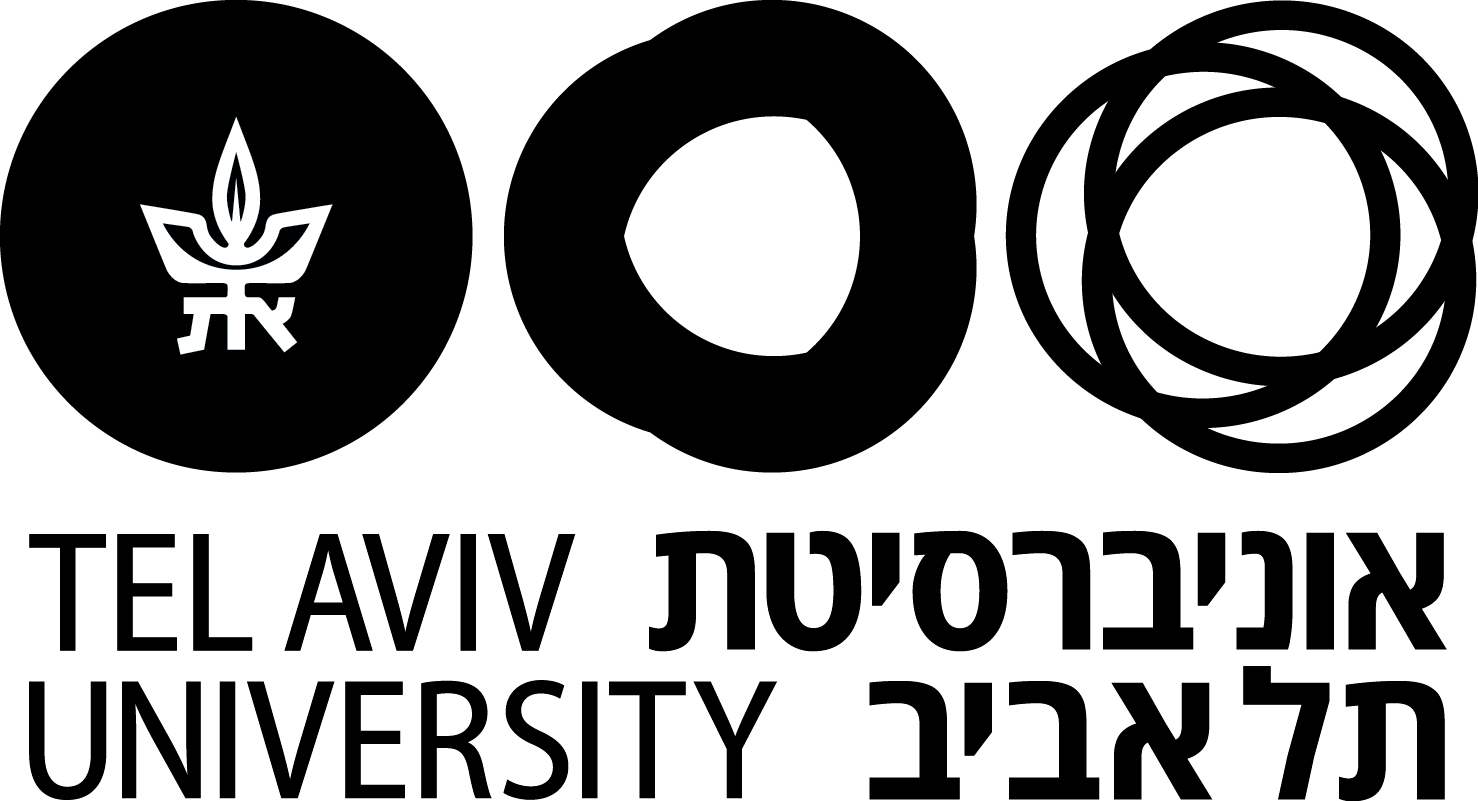
- Type: Limited liability company (LLC)
- Industry: Venture capital
- Founded: 2018; 8 years ago
- Founders: Tel Aviv University and Nimrod Cohen
- Headquarters: Tel Aviv, Israel
- Key people: Nimrod Cohen
- Revenue: 573,774,515 United States dollar (2011)
- Total assets: 1,158,069,504 United States dollar (2011)
- Website: www.tauventures.co.il

TAU Ventures is a venture capital firm. founded in 2018 by the university and Nimrod Cohen to invest in early state startups in Israel; it is headquartered in Tel Aviv. In early 2018, Tel Aviv University announced the creation of TAU Ventures, an early-stage venture capital fund with US$20 million. Its operational period is a seven-year cycle, tentatively. It is a first of its kind concept in Israel, modelled after similar funds existing in other universities such as Stanford University, the University of California, Berkeley, and Massachusetts Institute of Technology (MIT). Nimrod Cohen is the managing partner.

=== Investments ===
TAU Ventures invests an initial capital of US$500,000 with potential follow-up investments into early stage startups of Israel belonging to various industries such as enterprise solutions, fintech, industry 4.0, and food technology, with a majority being software related.

The TAU Ventures ecosystem combines the resources and network of Tel Aviv University, industry connections, and a network of Israeli startup founders. It operates at its co-working office space located in Tel Aviv. The space consists of in-house experts who mentor and support the portfolio of companies in various aspects of startup growth.

As of May 2021, TAU Ventures had invested in 17 startups. Some of the more notable companies include Xtend, SWIMM, Gaviti, MyAir, Medorion, Castor, and Hoopo.

=== Accelerator program ===
Along with its venture capital operations, TAU Ventures operates an accelerator program in partnership with the Israeli Security Agency (ISA) which provides a technological platform for founders. It is a four-month exclusive program that connects startups with the ISA and a US$50,000 grant with no equity clause. The program is geared to companies developing civilian and commercial technologies and can benefit from various technical expertise, unique databases, technology validation, and other factors. The alumni startups have raised over US$100 million. Xtend, Cyberpion, Talamoos, Cyabra, DigitalOwl, Decodea, and NeuraLegion are some of its alumni.

=== Recognition ===
In 2018, IVC Research Center awarded TAU Ventures the citation for being the most active venture capital in Israel. In 2019 and 2021, Geektime listed TAU Ventures among the top five and top six of venture capital funds in Israel.

== Notable people ==
=== Faculty ===
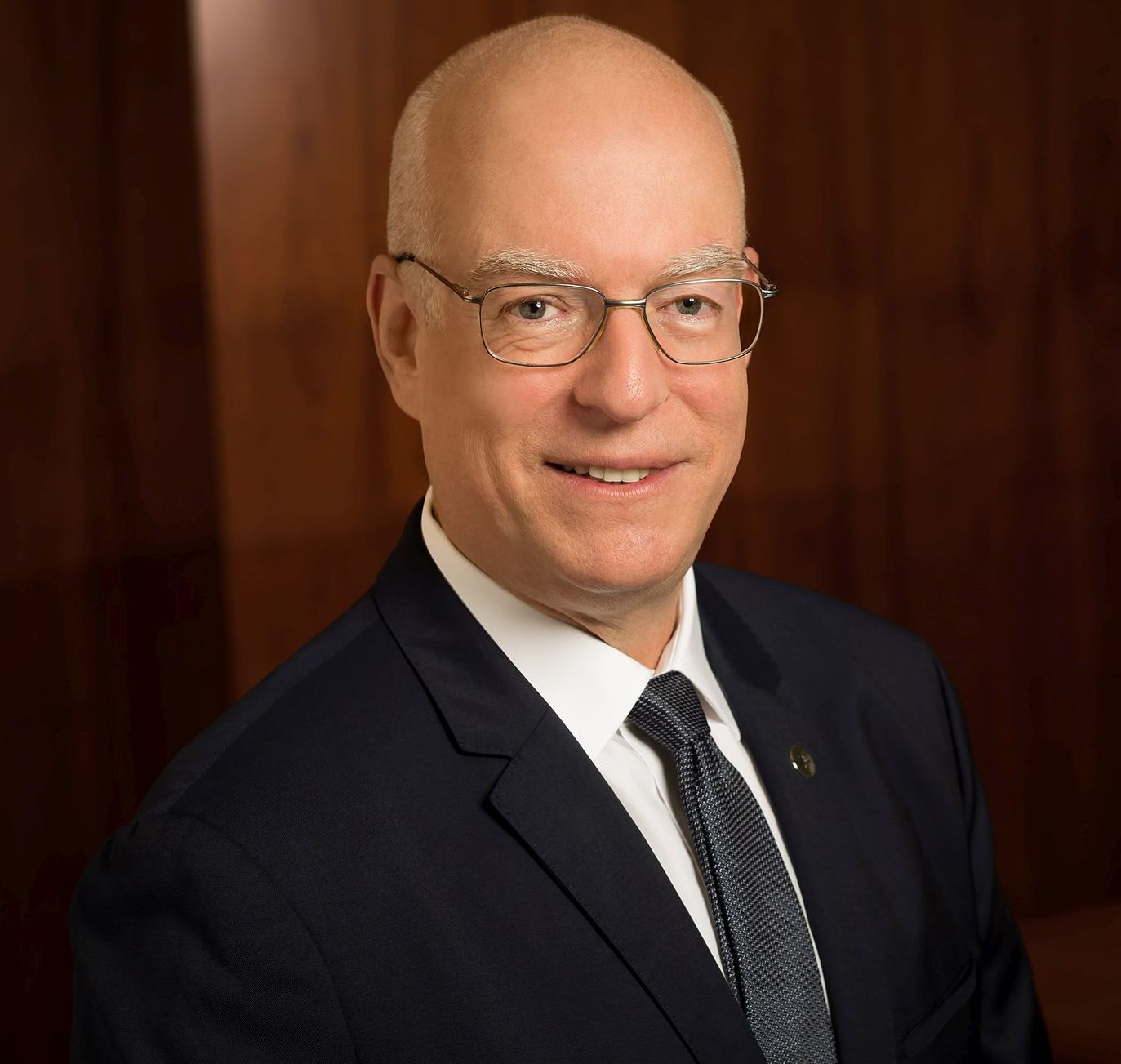
Ariel Porat, President of Tel Aviv University

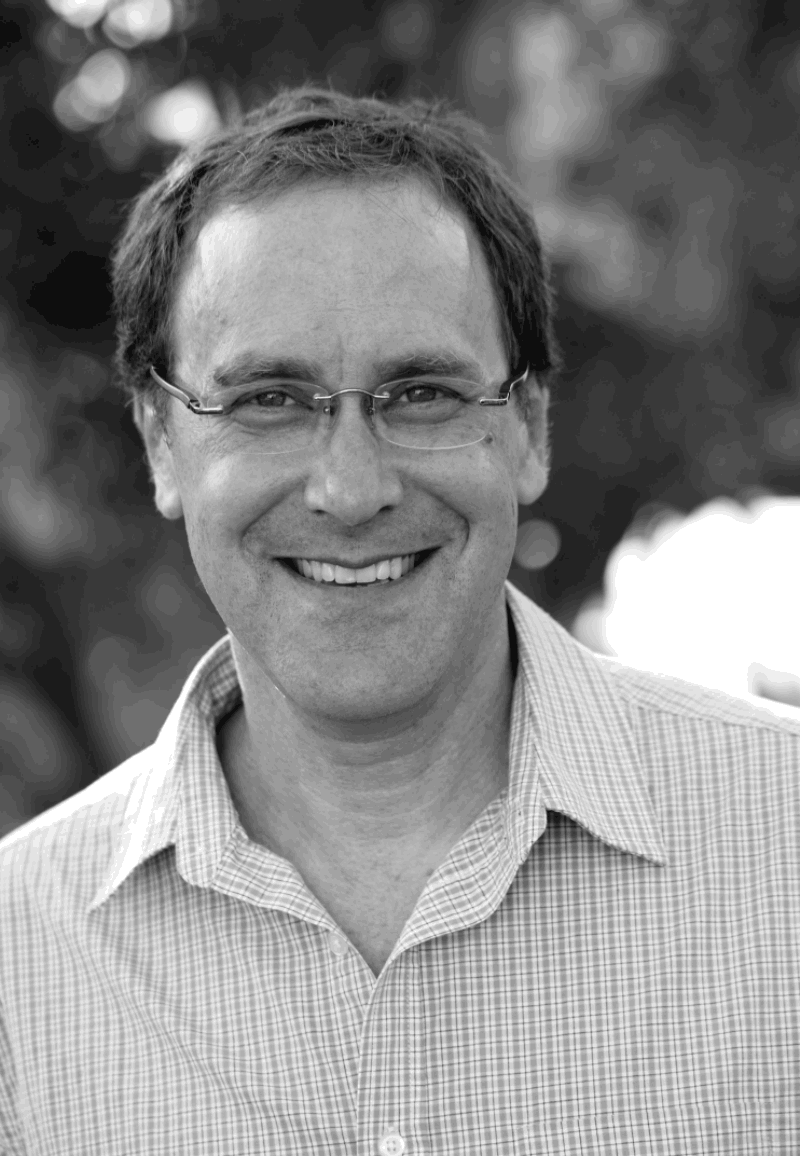
Daniel Chamovitz

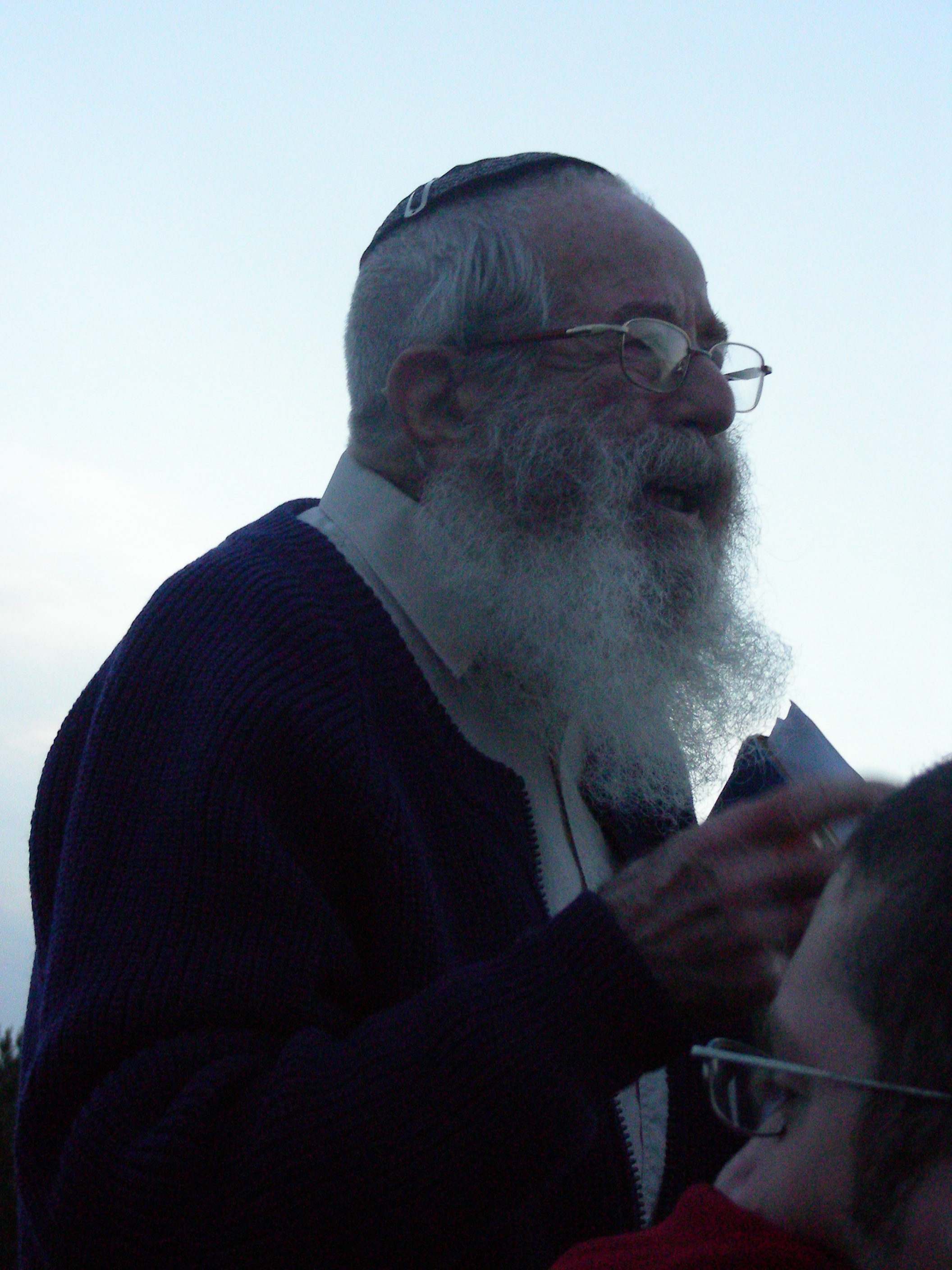
Yisrael Friedman

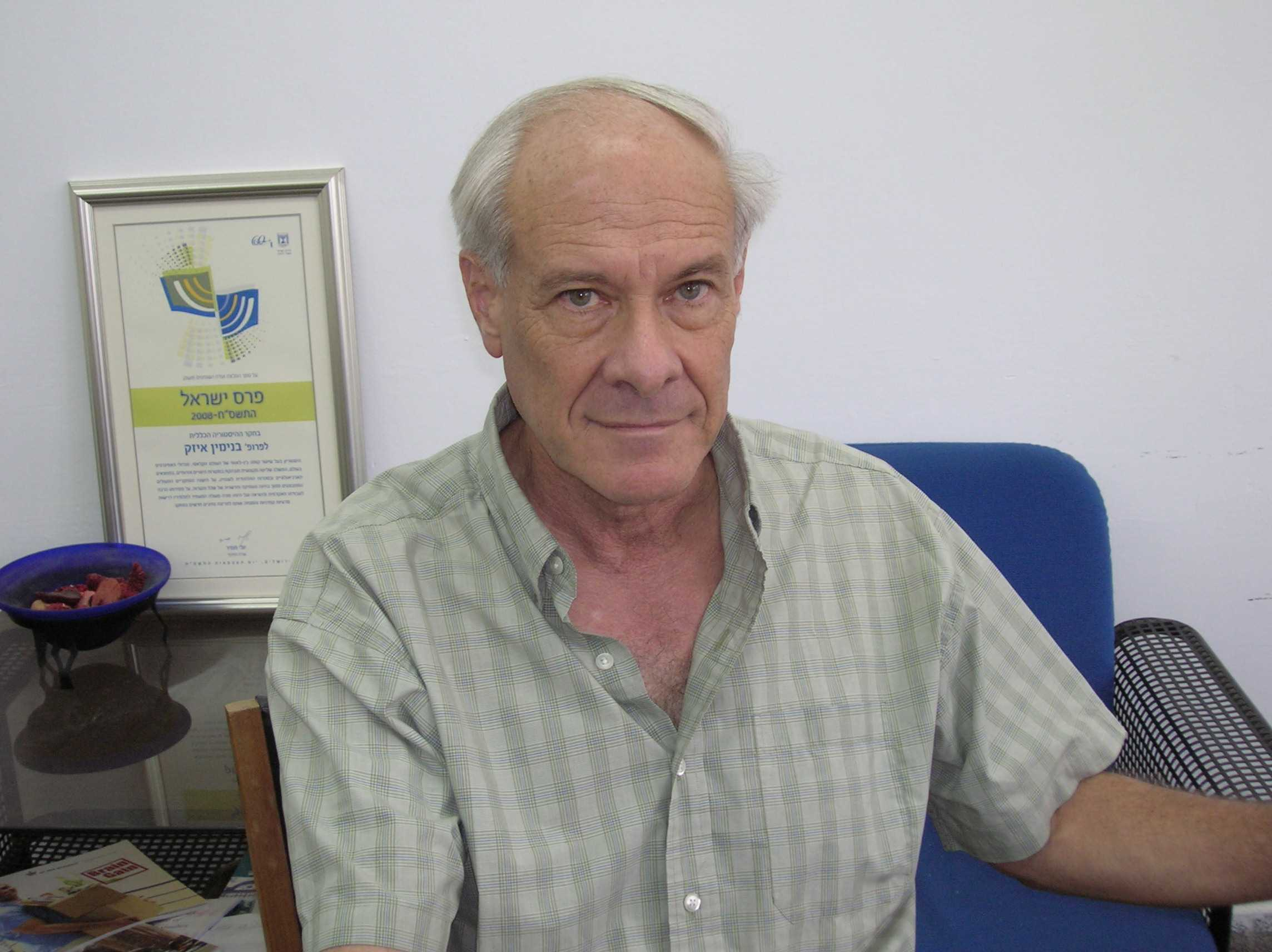
Benjamin Isaac

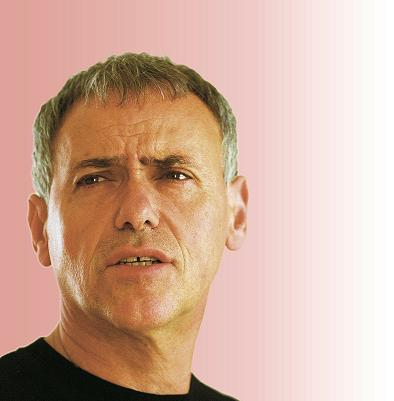
Ariel Rubinstein

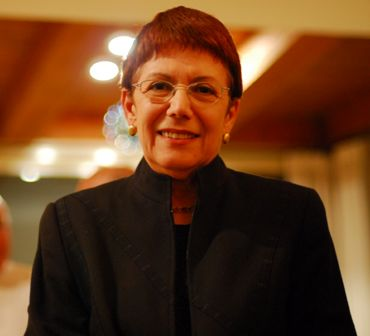
Anita Shapira

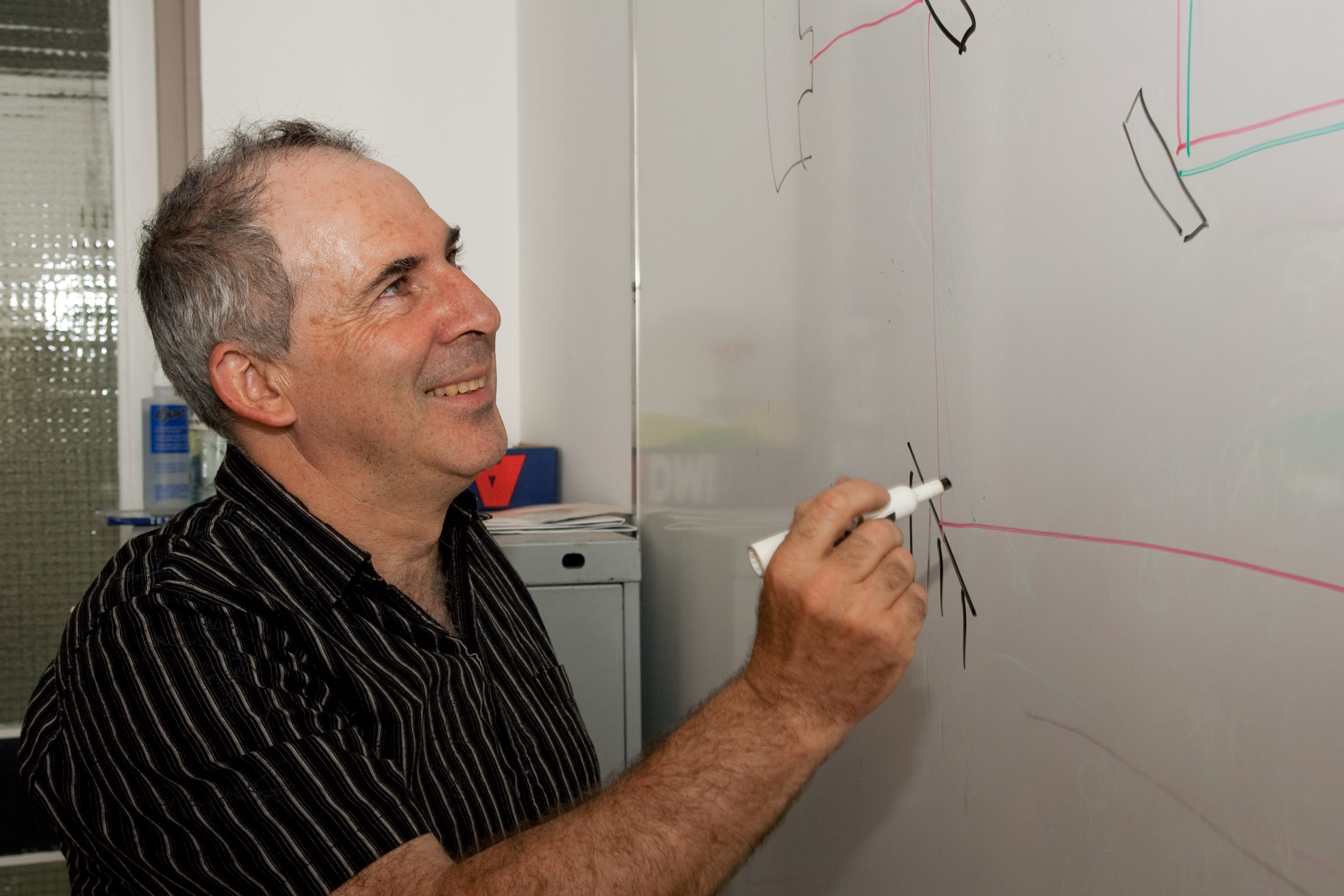
Lev Vaidman

Notable faculty members (past and present) include:

- Joseph Agassi, philosopher
- Yakir Aharonov, physicist
- Noga Alon, mathematician
- Yitzhak Arad, historian
- Karen Avraham, geneticist
- Shlomo Ben-Ami, historian, former Minister of Foreign Affairs
- Yoav Benjamini, statistician
- Ziva Ben-Porat, literary theorist, writer, and editor
- Joseph Bernstein, mathematician
- Silvia Blumenfeld, curator of the fungi collection
- Athalya Brenner, feminist Biblical scholar
- Daniel Chamovitz, biologist
- Guy Deutscher, physicist
- Yoram Dinstein, international law professor emeritus and former president of Tel Aviv University
- Uzi Even, chemist and political activist for LGBT rights
- Margalit Finkelberg, historian and linguist
- Israel Finkelstein, archaeologist
- Yisrael Friedman, historian
- Raphael E. Freundlich, Biblical studies and Latin
- Ehud Gazit, nanotechnologist, chief scientist – ministry of Science
- David Ginzburg, mathematician
- Bob Griffin (born 1980), basketball player and English Literature professor
- Daphna Hacker, lawyer
- Michael Harris, Public Policy Scholar
- Sylvie Honigman, senior lecturer in ancient history
- Benjamin Isaac, historian
- Joshua Jortner, physical chemist
- Shoshana Kamin, mathematician
- Aryeh Kasher, historian
- Asa Kasher, philosopher and authority on Ethics, author of IDF's Code of Conduct
- David S. Katz, historian
- Joseph Klafter, chemical physics, the eighth president of Tel Aviv University
- Shaul Ladany, industrial engineering
- Fred Landman, semanticist
- Zvi Laron, pediatric endocrinologist
- Orna Lin, lawyer
- Raphael Mahler, historian
- Yossi Matias, Computer Scientist
- Vitali Milman, mathematician
- Moshé Mizrahi, Oscar-winning film director
- Baruch Modan, oncologist
- Yuval Ne'eman (1925–2006), physicist, former minister of Science and Technology
- Abraham Nitzan, chemical physicist.
- Kennedy Otieno, criminologist
- Ariel Porat, legal scholar and president of Tel Aviv University
- Itamar Rabinovich, former Israeli ambassador to the United States and former president of Tel Aviv University
- Aviad Raz, sociologist
- Tanya Reinhart (1943–2007), linguist
- Amnon Rubinstein, former Dean of Law, also former Education minister
- Ariel Rubinstein, economist
- Joseph Sadan, emeritus professor, Department of Arabic and Islamic Studies
- Pnina Salzman, pianist and piano pedagogue
- Shlomo Sand, historian
- Leon Schidlowsky, composer
- Milette Shamir, scholar of American literature and vice president of Tel Aviv University
- Anita Shapira, historian
- Micha Sharir, mathematician
- Edna Shavit, drama
- Margot Shiner, gastroenterologist
- Joshua Sobol, playwright, writer, and director
- David Soudry, mathematician
- Carlo Strenger psychologist, philosopher
- Leonard Susskind, physicist
- Boris Tsirelson, mathematician
- Jacob Turkel, Israeli Supreme Court Justice
- Lev Vaidman, physicist
- Avi Weinroth, lawyer
- Paul Wexler, linguist
- George S. Wise, first president of the university (1963–1971)
- Moshe Wolman, neuropathologist
- Amotz Zahavi, biologist
- Moshe Zviran, Dean of the Coller School of Management

=== Alumni ===
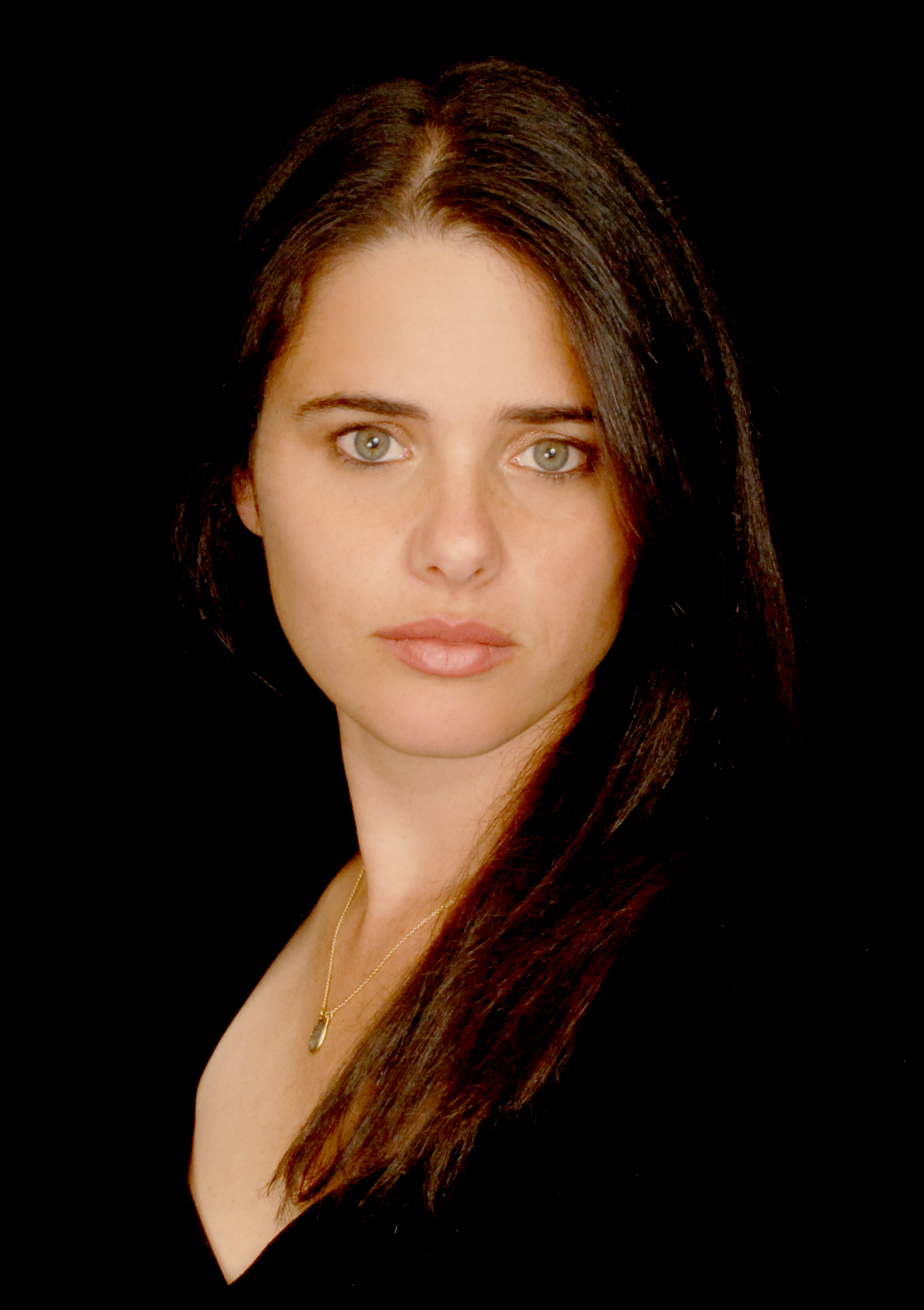
Ayelet Shaked, former Israel's Minister of Interior

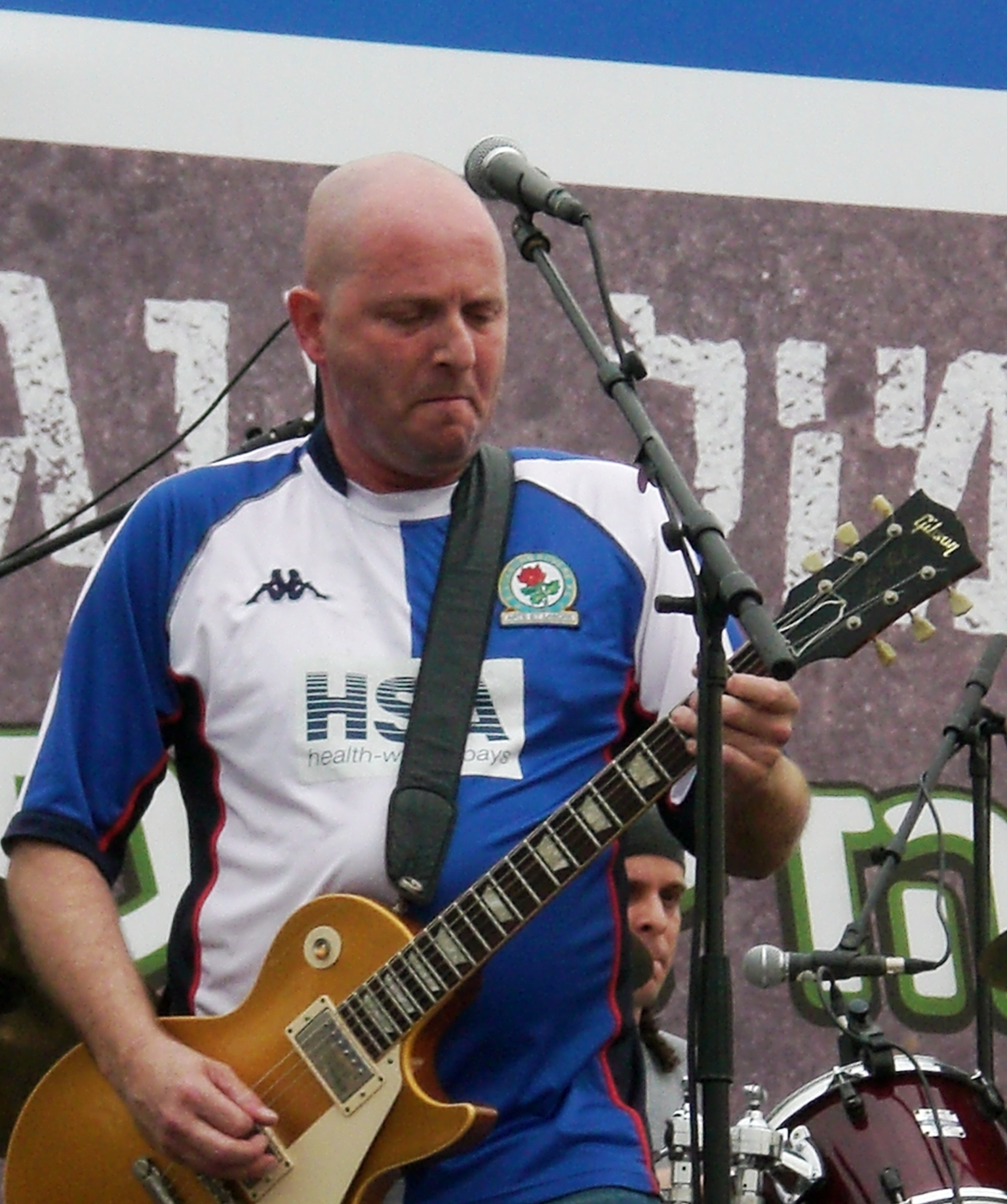
Tal Friedman

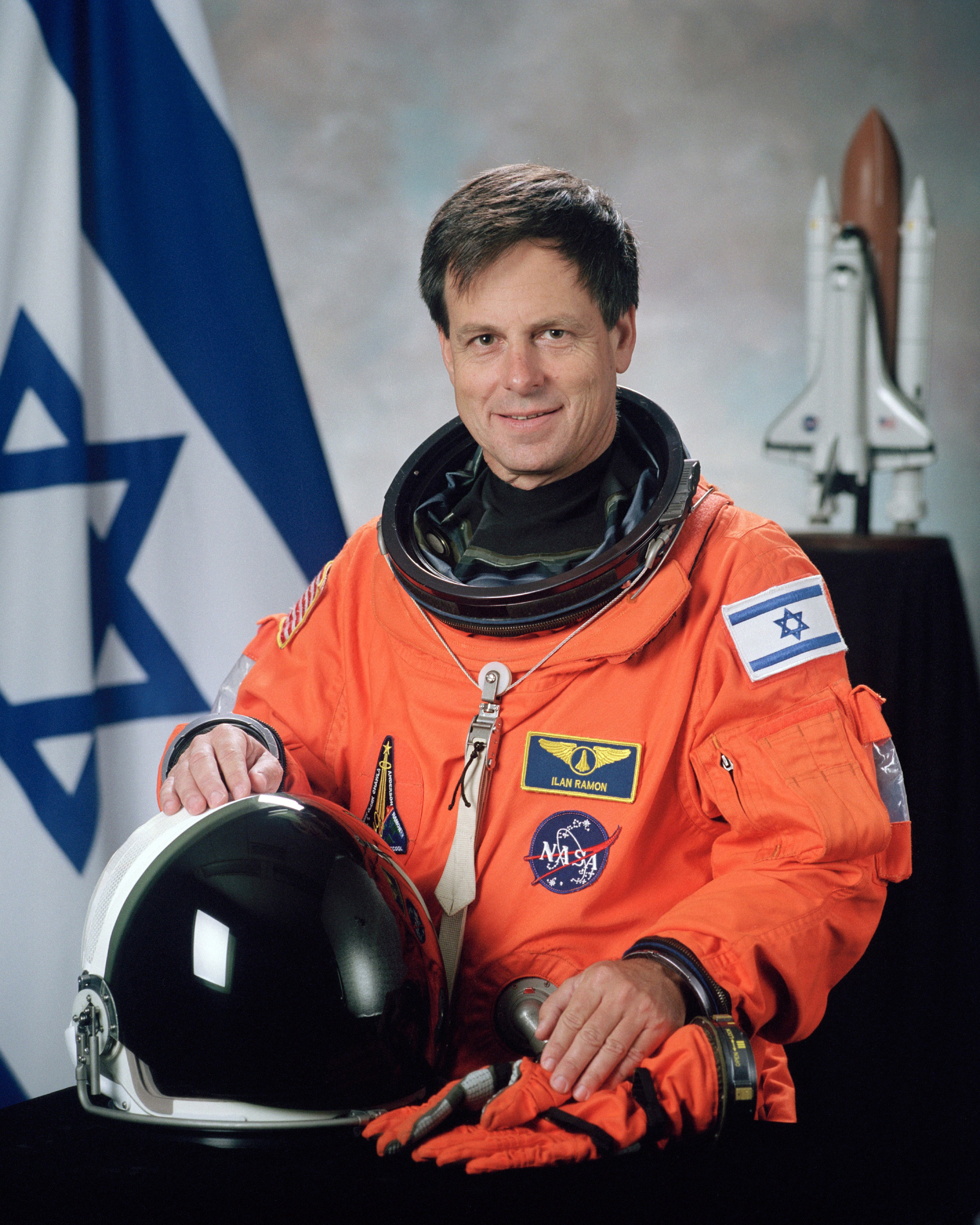
Ilan Ramon

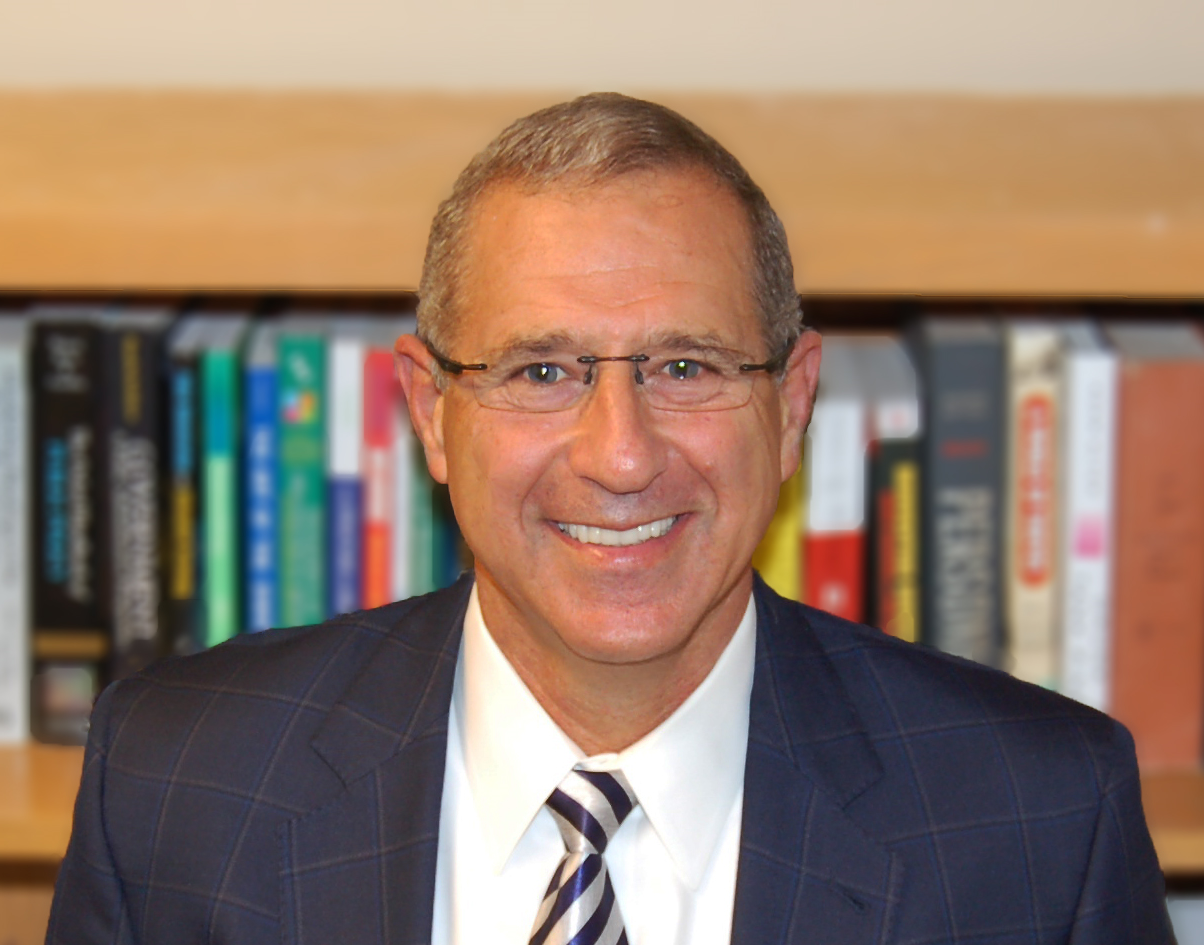
Michael Harris

- Carmela Abraham, neuroscientist and Alzheimer's disease researcher
- Ofra Strauss, Israeli business magnate and industrialist.
- Asaf Zamir, Israeli politician, lawyer and diplomat
- Nadav Ahituv, bioengineering professor and geneticist
- Yair Ansbacher, author and military researcher
- Zvi Arad (1942–2018), mathematician, acting president of Bar-Ilan University, president of Netanya Academic College
- Dan Ariely, author and academic
- Shai Avivi, actor
- Fouad Awad, theatre director
- Lucy Ayoub, actress and television host
- Alon Bar, award-winning filmmaker
- Daphne Barak Erez, current Supreme Court of Israel justice
- Mohammad Barakeh, Knesset member and leader of Hadash
- Rebecka Belldegrun (born 1950), ophthalmologist and businesswoman
- Shlomo Ben-Ami, historian, former Minister of Foreign Affairs (Labor)
- Yochai Benkler, co-director of the Berkman Center, Harvard Law School
- Aluf Benn, editor-in-chief of Haaretz
- Avishay Braverman (born 1948), Knesset member and president of the Ben-Gurion University of the Negev
- Shimshon Brokman (born 1957), Olympic sailor
- Moran Cerf (born 1977), neuroscientist, professor at the Kellogg School of Management at Northwestern University
- Telalit Charsky (born 1986), cellist
- Nili Cohen (born 1947), professor and legal expert
- Ran Cohen, former Minister of Housing (Meretz)
- Simon L. Dolan, Israeli-born academic
- Orna Donath (born 1976), academic and activist
- Arie Eldad, former Knesset member (National Union (Israel))
- Israel Eliashiv, former Israeli Ambassador to Singapore
- Dana Erlich, Israeli Ambassador to Ireland
- Nancy Ezer, author and professor of Hebrew at UCLA
- Yael S. Feldman, Abraham I. Katsh Professor of Hebrew Culture and Education and professor of Hebrew and Judaic studies at New York University
- Ari Folman, filmmaker (Director of Waltz with Bashir)
- Tal Friedman, comedian, actor, and musician
- Amir Gal-Or, founder of the Infinity Group
- Zvi Galil (born 1947), computer scientist, mathematician, and president of Tel Aviv University
- Benny Gantz, Chief of General Staff of the Israel Defense Forces.
- Lior Geller, Academy Award and Emmy Award nominated filmmaker and Guinness World Record holder
- Dan Gillerman, former Israeli Ambassador to the UN, and vice-president of the 60th UN General Assembly
- Bob Griffin (born 1950), basketball player and English Literature professor
- Tamar Halperin, harpsichordist, pianist and musicologist
- Tzachi Hanegbi, member of Knesset, former minister of Internal Security (Likud and Kadima)
- Rafael Harpaz, Israeli Ambassador to the Philippines
- Michael Harris, Public Policy Scholar
- Avi Hasson, current Chief Scientist of the Ministry of Economy
- Natasha Hausdorff (born 1989), British barrister, international news commentator, and Israel advocate
- Zvi Heifetz, former Israeli Ambassador to the United Kingdom
- Ron Huldai, current mayor of Tel Aviv
- Yael Ichilov, writer (born 1968)
- Benjamin Isaac, historian
- Moshe Kam, 49th President of IEEE and Dean of the Newark College of Engineering
- Moshe Kaplinsky, Deputy Chief of the IDF General Staff
- Efraim Karsh, historian
- Rita Katz, terrorism analyst
- Etgar Keret, writer
- Dov Khenin, political scientist and Knesset member Hadash
- Joseph Klafter, chemical physics professor, the eighth president of Tel Aviv University
- Yosef Lapid, former Israeli vice premier, Minister of Justice and founder of the Shinui party
- Amos Lapidot (1934–2019), fighter pilot, 10th commander of the Israeli Air Force, and president of Technion – Israel Institute of Technology
- Peretz Lavie (born 1949), expert in the psychophysiology of sleep and sleep disorders, 16th president of the Technion - Israel Institute of Technology, Dean of the Rappaport Faculty of Medicine
- Keren Leibovitch, champion Paralympic swimmer
- Hanoch Levin (1943–99), dramatist, theater director, author and poet
- Emanuel Levy professor of film and sociology; film critic, Variety, Screen
- Amnon Lipkin-Shahak, former Israeli Chief of Staff and Minister of Tourism and Transportation
- Yossi Matias, computer scientist and Google executive
- Amit Mekel (born 1980), Israeli Ambassador to Paraguay
- Moni Moshonov, actor and comedian
- Yitzhak Mordechai, former Israeli Minister of Defense and Transportation
- Natasha Mozgovaya, journalist
- Abraham Nitzan, chemical physicist
- Sassona Norton, sculptor
- Daniella Ohad Smith, design historian
- Yitzhak Orpaz-Auerbach, author
- Mazi Melesa Pilip, Ethiopian-born American politician
- Ophir Pines-Paz, former Interior Minister (Labor)
- Ariel Porat (born 1956), president of Tel Aviv University
- Gideon Raff, director and screenwriter, creator of the award-winning Israeli TV series Prisoners of War, adapted into Homeland
- Haim Ramon, former Minister of Health and Justice (Labor and Kadima)
- Ilan Ramon (1954–2003), first Israeli astronaut
- Yoram Raved, attorney
- Daniel Reisner, former Head of the International Law Branch of the IDF Legal Division
- Elie Rekhess, historian of the Israeli–Palestinian conflict and faculty of Northwestern University
- Gideon Sa'ar, Knesset member and Minister of Interior Affairs (Likud)
- Areej Sabbagh-Khoury, sociologist
- Anat Schwartz, filmmaker
- Shay Segev, business executive
- Hanoch Senderowitz (born 1963), Israeli chemist
- Hamutal Shabtai, novelist
- Ron Shachar, professor and researcher
- Simon Shaheen, musician
- Silvan Shalom, former minister of Finance and Foreign Affairs (Likud)
- Ayelet Shaked, Israel's former Minister of Justice and former Minister of Interior (Yamina)
- Adi Shamir, cryptographer, co-inventor of the RSA cryptosystem
- Ariel Sharon (1928–2014), Prime Minister of Israel (Likud and Kadima)
- Lou Silver, basketball player
- Daniel Sivan, professor
- Uri Sivan, physicist, professor, and president of the Technion – Israel Institute of Technology
- Nahum Sonenberg, biochemist at McGill University
- Michael Wolffsohn, author and former professor for contemporary history at the University of the Bundeswehr Munich
- Yuval Tal, founder of Payoneer
- Gadi Taub, historian, author, screenwriter, and political commentator
- Hagit Messer Yaron (born 1953), electrical engineer, businesswoman, and president of Open University of Israel
- Maya Arad Yasur (born 1976), playwright
- Natan Yonatan (1923–2004), poet
- Poju Zabludowicz, billionaire, philanthropist, and owner of Tamares Group
- Bat-Sheva Zeisler, singer and actress
- Misha Zilberman (born 1989), Olympic badminton player
- Abdel Rahman Zuabi, former Supreme Court of Israel justice
- Ghil'ad Zuckermann, linguist
- Igal Vardi (born 1953), graphologist and psychologist
- Yoram Harth (born 1958) dermatologist and inventor

Sackler Family

Tel Aviv University held significant ties to the Sackler family. As more became known of the role of members of the Sackler family in the global opioid crisis, many including the Israel Medical Association called for the removal of the Sackler name from the Faculty of Medicine. As of November 2021, no members of the Sackler family served on the university's board of governors. In June 2023, the Sackler name was removed from the university's Faculty of Medicine. In November 2024, the university stripped the Sackler name from its international prize in biophysics.

== See also ==
- Beth Hatefutsoth
- List of universities in Israel
- Tel Aviv International Student Film Festival
