= Yair Ansbacher =

Israeli military researcher and author

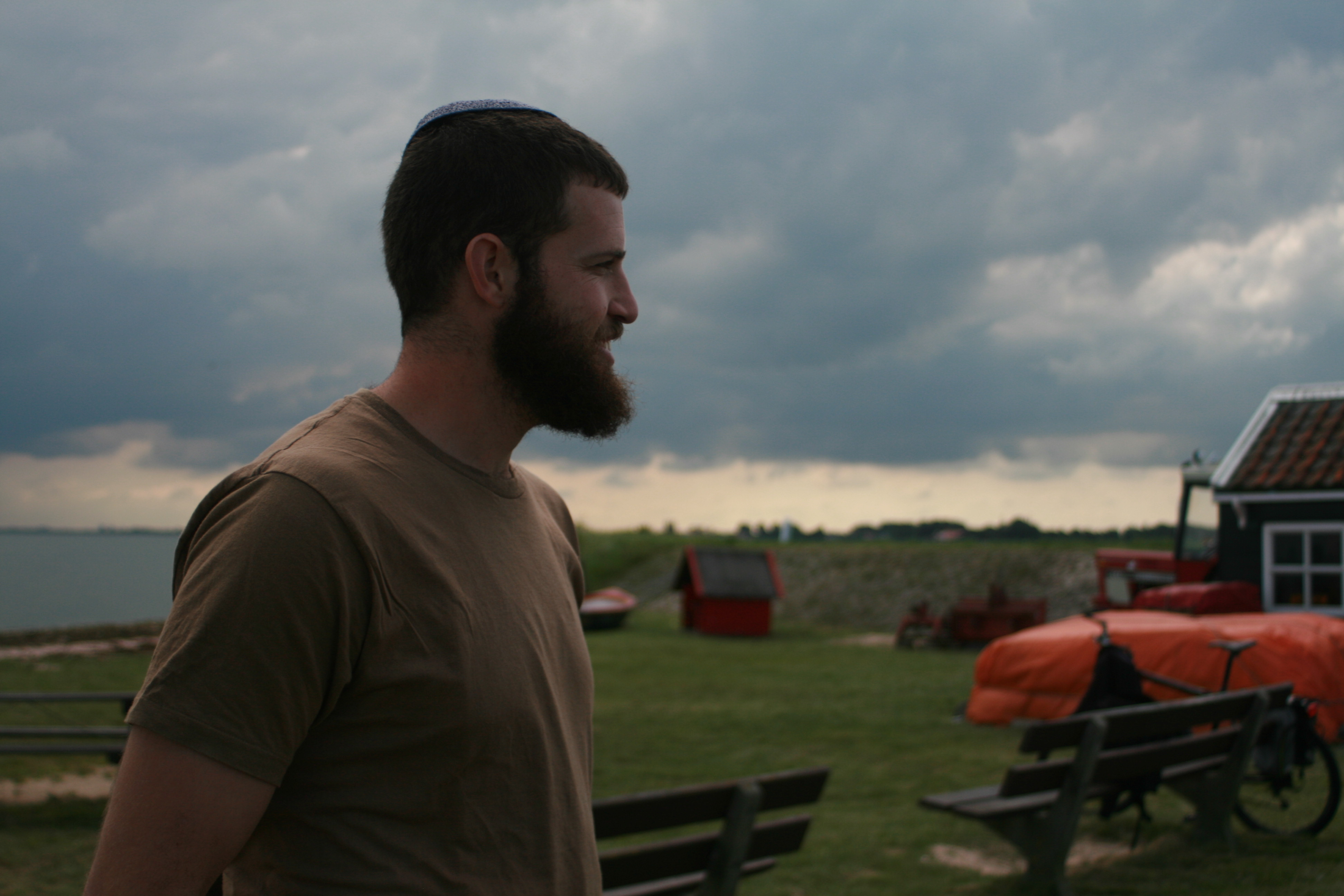
Yair Ansbacher

Yair Ansbacher (Hebrew: יאיר אנסבכר) is an Israeli national security expert, educator, a graduate of the IDF Special Forces. He is a consultant and researcher in several bodies in the Israeli defense establishment and leading research institutes in Israel. He was part of the IDF team that responded to the October 7 attacks in 2023 in Kibbutz Nir Yitzchak.

== Early life ==
Yair Ansbacher was born in 1983 and raised in Jerusalem to a family of four children. His grandfather on his father's side was Mordechai Ansbacher, a German-born Holocaust survivor who served as the first director of the Yad Vashem Holocaust museum in Jerusalem and was also a key witness in the trail of Nazi war criminal Adolf Eichmann. Yair Ansbacher later published a book about his grandfather entitled I have hoped in your salvation, O Lord: The Life Story of Mordechai Ansbacher.

Ansbacher's great-grandfather was Mordechai Buchsbaum, an activist with the Agudath Israel movement and a deputy mayor of Jerusalem.

Ansbacher attended Netiv Meir high school in Jerusalem and studied at the Bnei David pre-military preparatory school in Eli . He enlisted in the IDF in 2002 and served as a soldier in the commando and special forces Maglan unit.

== Education ==
Ansbacher is a graduate of Lifshitz College of Education in Jerusalem. He holds a master's degree in diplomacy and security from Tel Aviv University and received a doctorate from Ariel University.

His research was supervised by Ron Schleifer and focused on the study of military special forces in the modern age and their impact on contemporary wars. He earned the Bar-Ilan University President's Award for Doctoral Students for his academic articles.

He became closer to religion during a trip to New Zealand in which he visited a Chabad center.

== Academic career ==
Ansbacher served as an educator at the AMIT school in Ma'ale Adumim, and also initiated and led informal educational projects in the city, such as a youth club for children of the Jewish-Ethiopian community and work in a youth activity center.

Under the guidance of Rabbi Eliyahu Kaplan, he established the Eitan pre-military preparatory school in Mishor Adumim in 2011.

In 2016 he published Do a Good Deed for Humanity, a guide to improving human relations.

Ansbacher is a fellow at the Misgav Institute, which is affiliated with the Kohelet Forum, and was also previously a senior research fellow at the Kohelet Forum.

He has written about the Ukraine-Russia War. In 2022 he was the first researcher in the West to identify in real time the strategic ambush that the Ukrainians had set for the Russians at Hostmel Airport near Kiev. He published an article in the IDF Journal on the subject, in which he claimed that this was a strategic Russian failure that actually thwarted Vladimir Putin's original war plan from the very beginning to eliminate the top Ukrainian leadership in the first hours of the war.

He was a presenter on a podcast special on Great Operations of the Special Forces on Galei Tzahal radio with Dr. Amir Gilat.

== Military career ==
In 2006, Ansbacher served in the Second Lebanon War. His experiences were used for his book Like a Bird's Shadow published in 2009.

Ansbacher had a role in the 2020 Israeli film "April 7, 1980", which was released in Israel as Halaila HaZeh (This Night). He also served as a weapons instructor and battle coordinator for the film. He also was a weapons consultant and warfare instructor for the KAN 11 docu-drama The Longest Night. Both films dealt with the Misgav Am hostage crisis.

As a reservist, Ansbacher was among the first to be called up in response to the October 7 attacks. He was in the first-response team sent to Kibbutz Nir Yitzchak near the border of Gaza to combat Hamas terrorists. He called it the "longest 12 hours of my life". He wrote a book about his experiences in 2023 entitled And the Lion Will Be Exalted – On Correcting Israel's New Way of War. In 2025 he wrote a follow-up called Like a Lion, He Shall Rise: The War We Failed to Foresee, the Devastating Price We Paid, and the Miracles That Saved Us in which he uses his personal military experiences and historical research.

He served as an advisor to several bodies in the defense establishment, including the Northern Command, Israel Police and the National Information Headquarters in the Prime Minister's Office.

In 2024 and again in 2025 Ansbacher embarked on a speaking tour in the United States where he discussed his personal experiences on October 7 and how it relates to his studies in military history and his grandparents survival in the Holocaust. One speaking event at Florida State University drew anti-Israel protests.

== Personal life ==
Ansbacher lives in Ma'ale Adumim. He is married and has five children.

== Publications ==
- Like a Bird's Shadow, Yair Ansbacher, 2009, (a book about daily life in an elite IDF unit during the Second Lebanon War)
- How Special Operations Forces Can Contribute Strategically to Modern Wars, Yair Ansbacher & Ron Schleifer, The RUSI Journal, Volume 166, 2021 - Issue 4
- The three ages of modern Western special operations forces, Yair Ansbacher & Ron Schleifer, Comparative Strategy Volume 41, 2022 - Issue 1
- The Utility Knife Effect in Special Operations, Yair Ansbacher & Ron Schleifer, The RUSI Journal , Volume 168, 2023 - Issue 6
- Like a Lion, He Shall Rise: The War We Failed to Foresee, the Devastating Price We Paid, and the Miracles That Saved Us by Yair Ansbacher, 2023, Dani Books.
- עם כלביא יקום - מלחמת חרבות ברזל במבט אסטרטגי- אמוני, 2025, Dani Books.
