= MBZ-SAT =

MBZ-Sat
- Operator: Mohammed bin Rashid Space Centre

Spacecraft properties
- Manufacturer: Satrec Initiative

Start of mission
- Launch date: 14 January 2025

Mohammed Bin Zayed Sat (MBZ-Sat), is an Earth observation satellite developed by the Mohammed bin Rashid Space Centre, providing high-resolution images of the Earth's surface and advanced data to users worldwide.

The satellite was launched on 14 January 2025, delivering detailed imagery for several key applications, including environmental monitoring, navigation, infrastructure management, and disaster relief, contributing to the assessment of natural disaster response. It features twice the imaging accuracy, four times faster data transmission, and produces ten times more images compared to current capabilities.

== Specifications and launch ==
The official launch date of "MBZ-Sat" was announced as 14 January at 10:49 pm UAE time, within a 27-minute launch window, from Vandenberg Air Force Base, California, United States, aboard a Falcon 9 rocket operated by SpaceX.

It was fully developed at the Mohammed bin Rashid Space Centre, where the team completed final satellite tests at SpaceX facilities in the US. The satellite is named after Mohammed bin Zayed Al Nahyan, President of the United Arab Emirates, and was first announced in 2020 by Mohammed bin Rashid Al Maktoum.

The "Mohammed Bin Zayed Sat" has a total mass of 750 kg and dimensions of 3 × 5 meters, and features a fully automated system capable of producing imagery around the clock, generating over ten times more images than before. It can also create ultra-high-resolution imagery, enabling precise Earth monitoring, with rapid data delivery in just two hours.

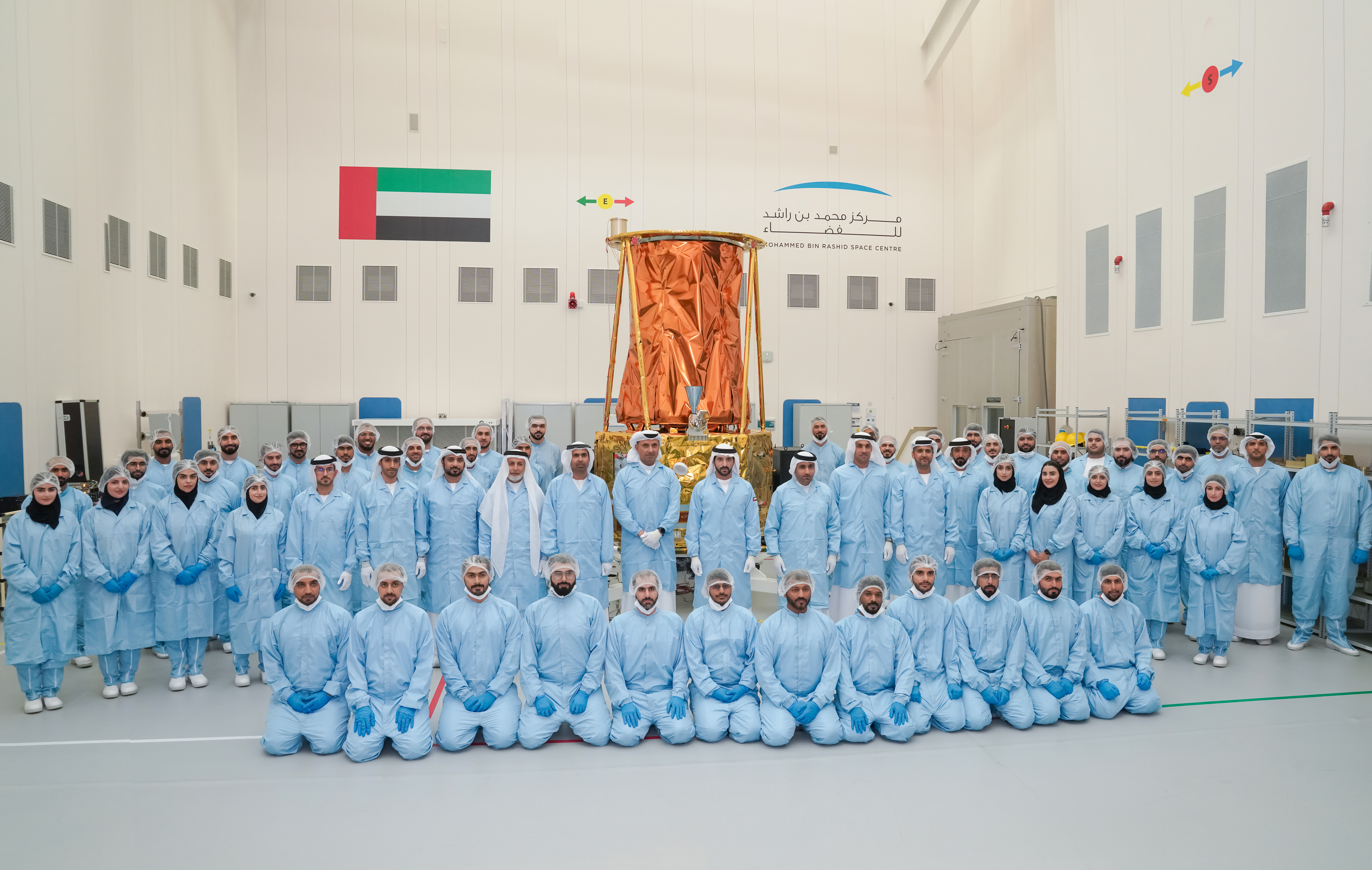
Sheikh Hamdan bin Mohammed Al Maktoum and MBRSC Team

It includes advanced technologies such as precise electric propulsion and a high-resolution camera to meet various needs, including environmental monitoring, infrastructure management, and disaster relief. It also contributes to strengthening cooperation with local UAE companies, supporting knowledge transfer, boosting the national economy, and meeting diverse needs, including environmental and economic planning.

== See also ==
- KhalifaSat
- DubaiSat-1
- Etihad-SAT
