= Salem Humaid Al Marri =

Director General of the Mohammed bin Rashid Space Centre

- Born: Dubai, United Arab Emirates
- Education: Khalifa University (BSc); University of South Wales (MSc)
- Occupation: Director General of Mohammed Bin Rashid Space Centre
- Known for: UAE Astronaut Programme, Emirates Mars Mission, KhalifaSat
- Title: Director General, MBRSC
- Awards: IAF Excellence in International Cooperation Award (2021)

Salem Humaid AlMarri is the director general of the Mohammed bin Rashid Space Centre (MBRSC). He was involved in overseeing the partnership with NASA to build the Emirates Airlock on the Gateway Lunar Space Station.

== Background ==
Prior to becoming director general, AlMarri held several roles, including project manager for DubaiSat-1 and DubaiSat-2, head of the UAE Astronaut Programme, and deputy director general at MBRSC. He is a member of the International Academy of Astronautics.

AlMarri has represented the UAE at international conferences and the United Nations Committee on the Peaceful Uses of Outer Space (UNCOPOUS). He has received the Exceptional Public Service Medal from NASA and the UAE Pioneers Award. He holds a bachelor's degree in computer network engineering from the Higher Colleges of Technology Dubai.

== Projects and Programmes ==
AlMarri was responsible for developing the strategy of the UAE Astronaut Programme and the selection process for its astronauts. While he served as Director General, MBRSC developed multiple satellites and carried out the Emirates Mars Mission and Emirates Lunar Mission.
