= Etihad-SAT =

UAE Earth Observation satellite

- Operator: Mohammed bin Rashid Space Centre

Spacecraft properties
- Manufacturer: Satrec Initiative

Start of mission
- Launch date: March 2025

"Etihad-SAT", is an advanced Earth observation satellite using radar imaging technology. It was developed to enhance the UAE's capabilities in Earth observation by introducing radar imaging technology, complementing the existing optical satellite systems. It was launched in March 2025 after being developed by the Mohammed bin Rashid Space Centre, within a strategic partnership with the South Korean company “Satrec Initiative”.

Etihad-SAT is distinguished by advanced technology for Earth observation with high accuracy under various weather and environmental conditions, day and night. It also provides three imaging modes: high-resolution imaging for small areas, wide coverage of large areas, and extended observation of longer regions. from detecting oil spills and managing natural disasters to enhancing maritime navigation, supporting smart agriculture, and conducting environmental monitoring. Additionally, the data provided by Etihad-SAT will be processed using AI-powered technologies.

== Development phase ==
The development of the satellite began two years prior to its launch as part of a knowledge exchange program in cooperation with the South Korean company "Satrec Initiative". The MBRSC team worked on defining the satellite's features and specifications before moving to the preliminary design and technical testing phase to ensure compliance with standards. In the next stage, engineers from the Mohammed bin Rashid Space Centre led the final design and manufacturing operations, in partnership with experts from "Satrec Initiative".

On 16 March 2025, the Mohammed bin Rashid Space Centre announced the successful launch of the satellite aboard a Falcon 9 rocket from Vandenberg Air Force Base in California, United States, at exactly 10:43 am UAE time. The centre confirmed its successful arrival into a low Earth orbit at an altitude of 500 km, with a mass of 220 kg. Shortly after, the ground station at MBRSC in Al Khawaneej, Dubai, received its signals. The launch stages included the successful shutdown of Falcon 9's first-stage engine, followed by ignition of the second-stage engine, and then the fairing separation.

== Specifications ==
Etihad-SAT was developed to enhance the UAE's capabilities in Earth observation by introducing radar imaging technology, complementing the existing optical satellite systems. This technology serves various fields, including oil spill detection, monitoring of natural disasters, strengthening maritime navigation, supporting precision agriculture, and environmental monitoring.

Etihad-SAT is equipped with advanced Earth observation technology that works in all weather and environmental conditions, day and night. It provides three imaging modes: high-resolution imaging for small areas, wide-area coverage, and extended swath imaging. These capabilities make it a vital tool for multiple sectors, from detecting oil spills, managing natural disasters, and tracking maritime navigation, to supporting smart agriculture and precise environmental monitoring.

Radar imaging technology is one of the advanced imaging methods that allows satellites to capture high-resolution images of the Earth's surface under all conditions, regardless of weather or time of day. Unlike traditional cameras, radar imaging relies on radar waves, enabling visibility through clouds, darkness, and even rain.

This advanced technology works by transmitting radar signals from the satellite towards Earth. These signals reflect off surfaces and return to the satellite, which records information related to the time taken for the signals to return and their strength. By analyzing this data, detailed images of the Earth's surface are generated.

== See also ==
- KhalifaSat
- Dubai Sat
