= Omran Sharaf =

Emirati engineer

His Excellency Omran Anwar Sharaf
- عمران شرف
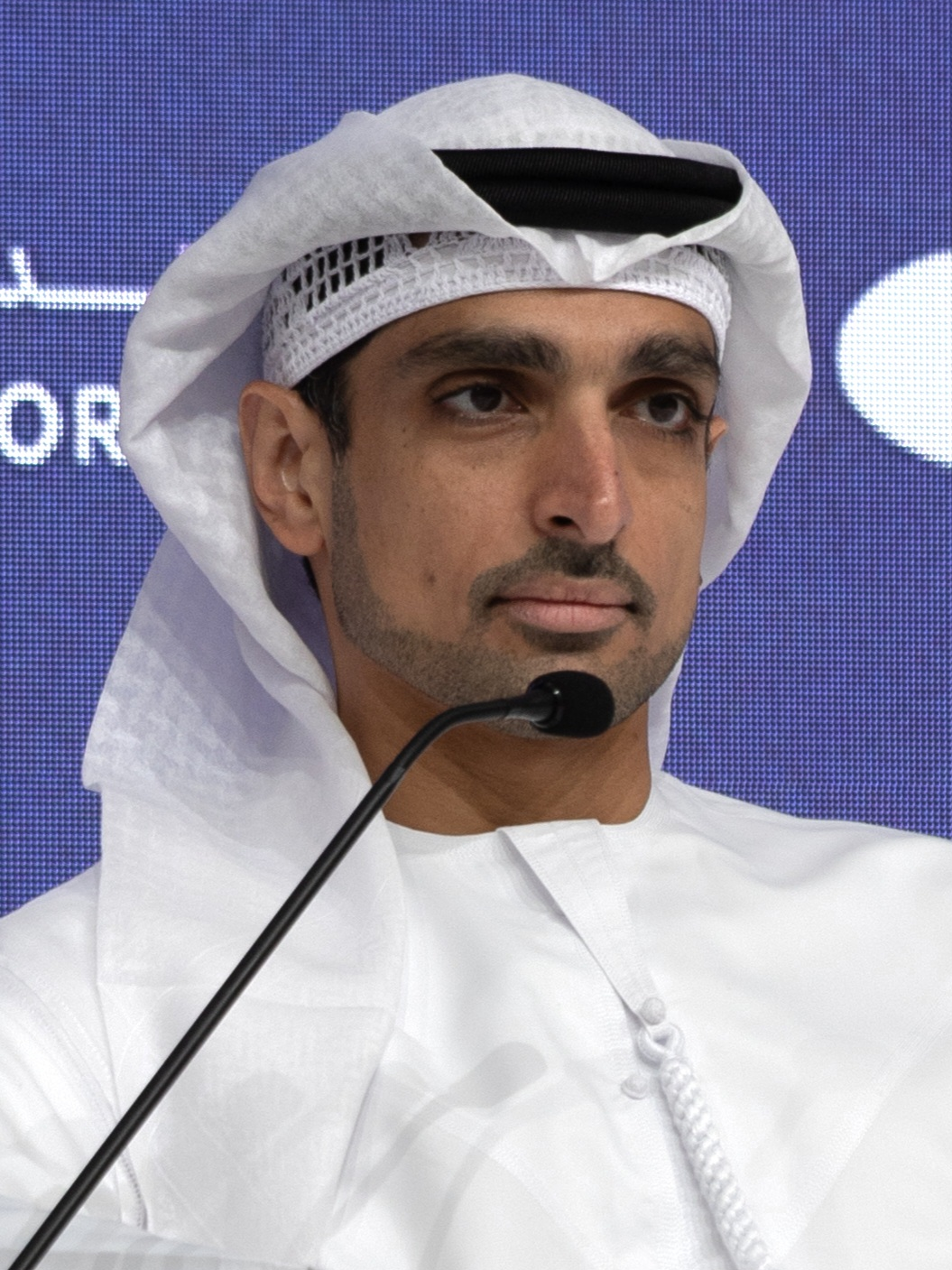
- Sharaf at the Dubai Future Forum (2024)

Assistant Foreign Minister for Advanced Science & Technology Affairs
- Incumbent
- Assumed office 7 September 2022
- President: Mohammed Bin Zayed Al Nahyan
- Prime Minister: Mohammed bin Rashid Al Maktoum
- Preceded by: Office established

Board Member at the UAE Space Agency
- President: Mohammed Bin Zayed Al Nahyan
- Prime Minister: Mohammed bin Rashid Al Maktoum

Personal details
- Born: 1984 (age 41–42) Dubai, United Arab Emirates
- Education: University of Virginia (BS); KAIST (MS)

Omran Sharaf (Arabic: عمران شرف; born 1984) is an Emirati engineer, space scientist, and government official currently serving as Assistant Foreign Minister for Advanced Science and Technology Affairs in the United Arab Emirates' Ministry of Foreign Affairs. Sharaf was notably the director of the Emirates Mars Mission, which was the first successful interplanetary space mission in the Arab world. He is currently a board member at the UAE Space Agency and formerly the chairperson for the United Nations Committee on the Peaceful Uses of Outer Space.

== Early life and education ==
Sharaf was born in Dubai. He graduated from the University of Virginia in 2005 with a bachelor's degree in electrical engineering and earned a master's degree in 2013 from KAIST. His dissertation was title "A Satellite for the Knowledge Economy: Knowledge Transfer in the UAE Space Program".

== Career ==
Sharaf began his career as an electrical engineer. In 2006, he was recruited as the first employee to join the newly established Emirates Institution for Advanced Science and Technology (EIAST). He lived in South Korea for seven years, working on the Command and Data Handling Subsystem of DubaiSat-1. On EIAST's second EO mission, DubaiSat-2, Omran worked on the Systems Engineering in addition to the Command & Data Handling Subsystem. After 5 years, he was assigned as Director of Space Images Processing & Analysis Department.

=== Emirates Mars Mission ===
In 2014, Sharaf was appointed as the project director of the Emirates Mars Mission. He and his team were responsible for developing, launching, and operating the Hope Probe, the spacecraft of the mission. As project director, he developed all the necessary capabilities and partnerships at the recently rebranded Mohammed bin Rashed Space Centre to achieve mission success.

Sharaf noted that international collaboration was at the center of the Emirates Mars Mission, stating that the mission’s success was driven by leveraging global partnership model that included key collaborations with institutions such as the University of Colorado’s Laboratory for Atmospheric and Space Physics (LASP), Arizona State University, and the University of California Berkeley, which brought critical expertise and resources to the project. Sharaf emphasized that these global collaborations enabled rapid knowledge transfer and innovation, allowing the team to develop advanced instruments like the Emirates Mars Infrared Spectrometer (EMIRS) in record time. This philosophy of building a network international partners, Sharaf believed, not only enriched the scientific and technological capabilities of the mission but also lays the groundwork for future cooperative endeavors in space exploration, while simultaneously fostering the development of local talent and expertise in the UAE.

=== Ministry of Foreign Affairs ===
On the 7th of September, 2022, UAE President Sheikh Mohammed bin Zayed issued a federal decree appointing Sharaf as an Assistant Foreign Minister for Advanced Science and Technology Affairs and designating him as a member of the diplomatic corps with the diplomatic rank of "Ambassador".
