= Mohammed bin Rashid Space Centre =

Dubai government entity

- مركز محمد بن راشد للفضاء

Agency overview
- Formed: 6 February 2006 as the Emirates Institution for Advanced Science and Technology
- Jurisdiction: Emirate government of Dubai
- Headquarters: Dubai, United Arab Emirates
- Agency executive: Salem Humaid Al Marri, Director General
- Website: www.mbrsc.ae

The Mohammed Bin Rashid Space Centre (MBRSC, Arabic: مركز محمد بن راشد للفضاء, romanized: markaz Muḥammad bin Rāshid lil-faḍāʾ) is a Dubai Government organization working on the UAE space program, which includes various space satellites projects, such as the Emirates Mars Mission, the Emirates Lunar Mission, and the UAE astronaut program. The center actively works to promote space science and research in the region and encompasses the Emirates Institution for Advanced Science and Technology (EIAST).

== Overview ==
Mohammed bin Rashid Al Maktoum, vice president and prime minister of the United Arab Emirates and ruler of Dubai, established the EIAST on 6 February 2006. On 17 April 2015, Mohammed bin Rashid Space Center was created, incorporating EIAST into it.

MBRSC contributes towards the development of various sectors within the United Arab Emirates and across the globe, using data from UAE satellites, and various applications related to space science. The center promotes space science and scientific research in the UAE and the Middle East, while also supporting various organisations in the management of natural disasters, rescue missions, environmental monitoring and land planning with its satellites, such as Dubai-Sat-1 and Dubai-Sat-2.

== Creation ==
To establish a research and knowledge-based economy in the UAE, Mohammed bin Rashid Al Maktoum issued a law in 2015, to establish the Mohammed bin Rashid Space Center. MBRSC was tasked to support the country's efforts in the field of space; to supervise the design, manufacturing and launch of the "Hope" probe (Misbar Al-Amal), the Arab world's first Mars probe; and to build an integrated infrastructure for manufacturing satellites and taking advantage of their various applications.

Hamdan bin Mohammed Al Maktoum, Crown Prince of Dubai, was appointed as chairman and general supervisor of the strategic plans and projects of MBRSC in June 2015.

Along with the establishment of the Mohammed Bin Rashid Space Center, Sheikh Mohammed also issued a law to join the Emirates Institution for Advanced Science and Technology (EIAST) with the center and consider it one of its affiliated institutions. As part of the law, EIAST will implement and follow up the policies, plans and decisions set by the Mohammed bin Rashid Space Center. The board of directors of the Mohammed bin Rashid Space center were appointed, including Hamad Obaid Al Sheikh Al Mansoori as chairman of the board, Yusuf Ahmed Al Shahbani as vice chairman; with Mansour Abdullah Bastaki, Mohammed Saif Al Miqbali, and Mansoor Juma Bu Osaiba as appointed members.

The center works to promote space technology and scientific research in the region through innovative space projects and programs.

== Satellites ==
The Mohammed bin Rashid Space Center works across four main areas, in order to achieve the goals and objectives set forth, for the development of the space industry in the region. These areas are: research and development of outer space, satellite manufacturing and systems development, Earth observation through satellite imagery, and ground station services to support other satellites.

The first satellite, DubaiSat-1, was launched on 29 July 2009 from the Baikonur launch site in Kazakhstan, and since then, the center has been building on its expertise to manufacture satellites with advanced technology for better research and development.

=== DubaiSat-1 ===
The first satellite launched by MBRSC Was DubaiSat-1, an earth observation satellite built by Satrec Initiative, a South Korean satellite manufacturing firm.

DubaiSat-1 was launched on 29 July 2009 from the Baikonur launch site in Kazakhstan, aboard a Dnepr launch vehicle. With a diameter of around 1.2 meters and a height of 1.35 metres, the satellite has a deck-and-longeron type structure, allowing easy assembly and disassembly. Dubai-Sat-1 weighs less than 200 kg including a 50 kg payload mass, and its average power consumption is less than 150 watts.

Dubai-Sat-1 is in a Low Earth orbit (LEO) and generates high-resolution panchromatic optical images with a resolution of 2.5 m. These images are used for a wide range of applications including infrastructure development, urban planning, and environment monitoring and protection. DubaiSat-1 images are also useful for promoting geosciences and remote sensing research.

Images from Dubai-Sat-1 have been used to monitor the overall development of mega projects like the Palm Islands and Al Maktoum International Airport in Dubai, and to monitor relief efforts during 2011 Tōhoku earthquake and tsunami in Japan.

=== DubaiSat-2 ===
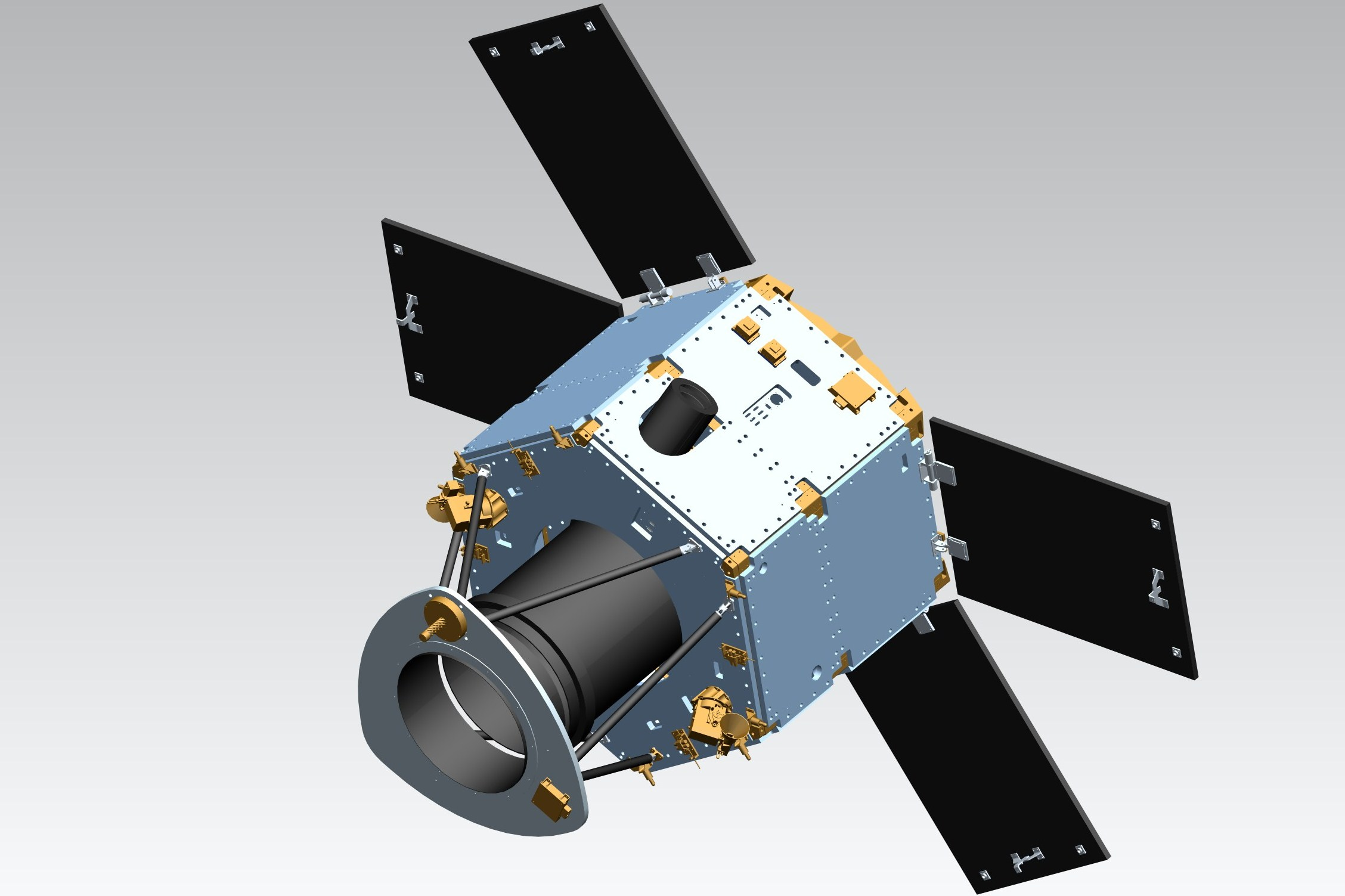
DubaiSat-2, UAE's Second Earth Observation Satellite

Shortly after the successful launch of DubaiSat-1, MBRSC and Satrec Initiative began work on DubaiSat-2, which launched on 21 November 2013 from the Yasny Launch Base in Russia, on a Russian Dnepr rocket, under the supervision of a team of engineers from MBRSC. The communication link with Dubai-Sat-2 was established within an hour after separation from Dnepr rocket, and the satellite took its first image 24 hours after its launch, capturing Bani Yas Island in Abu Dhabi.

=== Khalifa Sat ===
On 29 October 2018, MBRSC's most advanced satellite, KhalifaSat, was launched aboard a H-II A rocket from Tanegashima Space Center. KhalifaSat improved upon the capabilities of DubaiSat-2 with a more powerful camera and a faster image download speed. It was also notable for being the first satellite designed and built within the UAE.

=== Nayif-1 ===
Recording of a transmission of Nayif 1

Nayif-1 is the first ever Cube-Sat designed and manufactured by Emirati engineers, which was originally scheduled for launch in 2016, but delayed waiting for an appropriate SpaceX launch platform to be scheduled. The satellite was launched in February 2017 on the Indian Space Research Organisation PSLV-C37 launch vehicle, which established a world record by launching 104 satellites, the largest number of satellites deployed by a single launcher.

The name of the satellite is derived from the Arabic noun, which means "one that soars high above" or "one that is morally and intellectually superior". For the Nayif-1 project, MBRSC established a partnership with the American University of Sharjah (AUS) in order to provide the engineering students with hands-on experience in satellite manufacturing, testing and operations.

The Nayif-1 team consists of seven engineering students from the American University of Sharjah in electrical, mechanical and computer engineering disciplines. The satellite will be operated by these students, from the ground station to be built onsite at the American University of Sharjah.

With a dimension of 10×10×11.35 cm^{3} and a weight of 1.32 kg, the Cube-Sat will produce a communication footprint ranging from 5,000 to 5,500 km and it will orbit at a height between 450 km and 720 km for up to three years. The satellite will re-broadcast text messages to the world and it will collect data to help academic institutions in conducting different types of research.

=== MBZ-SAT ===
MBZ-SAT is the latest Earth observation satellite developed by MBRSC in the UAE. It was launched on January 14, 2024, from Vandenberg Space Force Base in California, United States.

The satellite is designed to capture high-resolution images and includes an automated system for image processing. It is intended for commercial use and various applications, including mapping, environmental monitoring, infrastructure management, and disaster response.

MBZ-SAT is part of the Satellite Development Programme and involved collaboration with the local industries, wherein 90% of the satellite's mechanical components were manufactured in the UAE.

=== Etihad-SAT ===
Etihad-SAT is an advanced Earth observation satellite using radar imaging technology. It was launched in March 2025 after being developed by the Mohammed bin Rashid Space Centre, within a strategic partnership with the South Korean company “Satrec Initiative”. It provides three imaging modes: high-resolution imaging for small areas, wide coverage of large areas, and extended observation of longer regions.

== Emirates Mars Mission ==
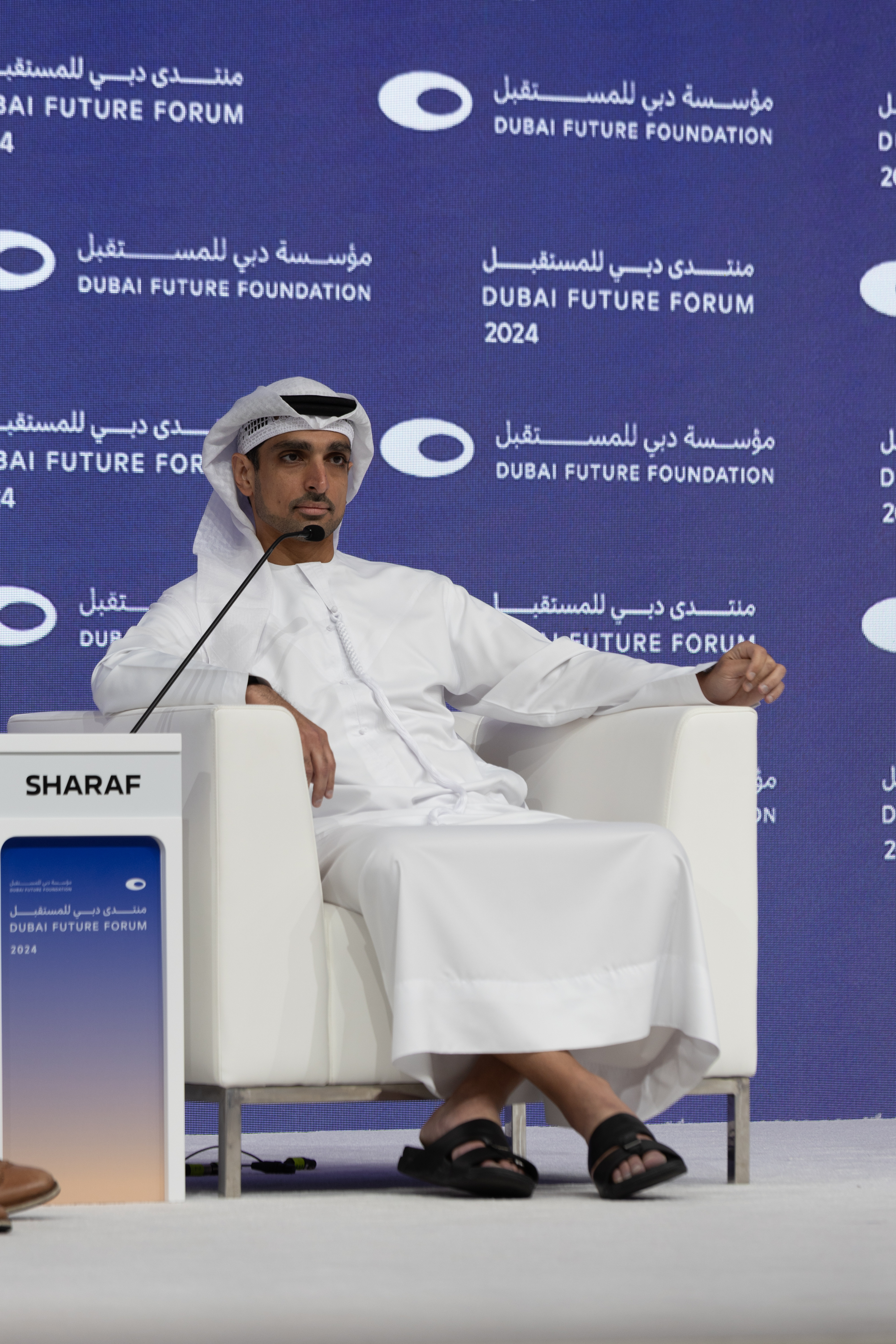
Omran Sharaf, director of the programs management, Mohammed bin Rashid Space Centre speaking at the Dubai Future Forum (2024)

The Emirates Mars Mission, also known as the Hope Mars Mission, is a mission aimed at sending an unmanned probe to Mars by 2021. The probe arrived in February 2021, which marks the 50th year since the founding of the United Arab Emirates.

The Emirates Mars Mission is the first ever space exploration mission to be carried out by the Arab World, and it is expected to drive the Middle East towards a new era of technological advancement. Mohammed bin Rash-id Al Maktoum named the probe to Mars as the "Hope Probe" or "Al-Amal" in Arabic, as it carries the hopes for scientific development in the region. The launch window for the Hope Probe fell in July 2020, marking the point when Earth and Mars were aligned in their orbits around the Sun and were closest to one another. The probe successfully launched on July 19. The completion and launch of the Hope Probe by this time was crucial as the next alignment would not take place before two years after 2020.

Mohammed bin Rashid Al Maktoum stated that the Emirates Mars Mission sends three important messages to the world: "The first is for the world: that Arab civilization once played a great role in contributing to human knowledge and will play that role again. The second is to our Arab brethren: that nothing is impossible and that we can compete with the greatest of nations in the race for knowledge. The third is for those who strive to reach the highest of peaks: set no limits to your ambitions and you can even reach space".

The Hope Probe is compact and hexagonal in shape and structure, weighing around 1500 kg including fuel. The probe is 2.37 m wide and 2.90 m tall, the overall size being approximately equivalent to a small car. "Hope" will use three 600-watt solar panels to charge its batteries and it will communicate with Earth using a high-gain antenna with a 1.5 m wide dish. The spacecraft will also be equipped with star tracker sensors that will help determine its position in space by studying the constellations in relation to the Sun. Two sets of rocket thruster and four to six large Delta-v thrusters, will control the speed of the probe and eight to 12 small Reaction Control System (RCS) thrusters will be responsible for the delicate maneuvering.

The expected travel time of the Hope Probe is about 200 days at a speed of up to 40,000 kilometres per hour (11 km/s) on its journey of 60 million kilometers. Upon arrival at Mars, it will study the atmosphere of Mars for two years. Its unique placement in orbit around Mars will provide a new type of data to build "the first truly holistic models" of the Martian atmosphere. The data is expected to provide reasons for the decay of the atmosphere to a level where it is now too thin to allow liquid water to exist. The Hope Probe will carry three scientific instruments to study the Martian atmosphere, which include a digital camera for high resolution colored images, an infrared spectrometer that will examine the temperature patterns, ice, water vapors in the atmosphere, and an ultraviolet spectrometer that will study the upper atmosphere and traces of oxygen and hydrogen further out into space.

The Emirates Mars Mission team includes 150 Emirati engineers, with Omran Sharaf as the Project Manager; Sarah Amiri, Deputy Project Manager; Ibrahim Hamza Al Qasim, Deputy Project Manager, Strategic Planning, and Zakareyya Al Shamsi, Deputy Project Manager for the Emirates Mars Mission Operations.

The United Arab Emirates Space Agency and ISRO set up a joint working group regarding this mission in 2019.

== Emirates Lunar Mission ==
The Emirates Lunar Mission is part of the new 2021-2031 strategy launched by the Mohammed bin Rashid Space Center (MBRSC), which includes the development and launch of the first Emirati lunar rover named “Rashid”, after the late Sheikh Rashid bin Saeed Al Maktoum, builder of modern Dubai.

Rashid is the world's most compact rover designed and manufactured by MBRSC. It will study various aspects such as the thermal properties of the lunar surface and the formation and components of the lunar soil and pave the way for human exploration beyond the Moon.

The Emirates Lunar Mission is a pivotal step towards the Mars 2117 program, which aims to build a human settlement on Mars by 2117.

== Team and leadership ==
MBRSC is headed by Director General Salem Humaid Al Marri, who is responsible for all administrative and space project-related policies.

The center's hierarchy is divided into two main sectors: the Scientific and Technical Affairs Sector, and the Administrative and Financial Sector. Both the sectors have their own objectives and policies. The team's structure follows a hierarchy defined to ensure that all strategic objectives are met with the highest level of excellence.

== UAE Astronaut Program ==
The UAE Astronaut Programme was launched in 2017 as the UAE's national initiative to develop human spaceflight capabilities. The programme began with the selection of the first batch of astronauts from an initial pool of 4,022 applicants. After multiple rounds of assessments, the final selection resulted in Hazzaa AlMansoori and Sultan AlNeyadi being announced as the first two astronauts in September 2018.

=== Missions ===
AlMansoori became the first Emirati astronaut to fly to space, launching aboard Soyuz MS-15 on 25 September 2019 for an eight-day mission aboard the International Space Station (ISS). During his stay, he conducted scientific experiments and cultural outreach activities before returning to Earth on 3 October 2019 aboard Soyuz MS-12.

AlNeyadi participated in Expedition 69, becoming the first Arab astronaut to complete a long-duration space mission, spending six months on the ISS from March to September 2023. He also became the first Arab to perform a spacewalk, lasting seven hours and one minute. During his mission, AlNeyadi conducted multiple research experiments in collaboration with NASA, ESA, CSA, JAXA, and CNES.

=== Second Batch of Astronauts ===
In April 2021, the UAE announced the selection of Nora AlMatrooshi, the first Emirati female astronaut, and Mohammad AlMulla as part of the second batch of the UAE Astronaut Programme. Both astronauts graduated from the NASA Astronaut Candidate Class training programme in 2024 and are now qualified to go on space mission.

== List of Emirati astronauts ==
Name	Group	Missions	Time in space
Hazzaa Al Mansoori	1 (2018)	Soyuz MS-15/MS-12 (19th Visiting Expedition)	7d 21h 1m
Nora Al Matrooshi	2 (2021)	None, awaiting assignment	0d 0h 0m
Mohammad Al Mulla	2 (2021)	None, awaiting assignment	0d 0h 0m
Sultan Al Neyadi	1 (2018)	SpaceX Crew-6 (Expedition 68/69)	185d 22h 43m

== Facility ==
The headquarters of Mohammed Bin Rashid Space Center is located at Al Khawaneej, Dubai. The facility also includes a Clean Room for designing and manufacturing of various space satellites being worked upon by the MBRSC.

The facility includes a clean room which has been manufactured to ensure smooth execution of all satellite manufacturing projects and development of the Hope Probe. All the ongoing projects, including manufacturing of the earth observation satellites, including Khalifa Sat and Nayif-1, along with development of Hope Probe, are carried out in the clean room by Emirati engineers.

== Collaboration ==
MBRSC is part of the Global Alliance of Earth Observation Satellites Operators – PanGeo. This is a collaboration between Dauria Aerospace (US/Russia), MBRSC (UAE), Elecnor Deimos (Spain) and Beijing Space Eye Innovation Technology (China). These four entities agreed to share the products, data and images derived from their satellites, as part of the PanGeo alliance.

The PanGeo fleet consists of nine satellites currently in orbit: Perseus-M1, Perseus-M2, DubaiSat-1, DubaiSat-2, Deimos-1, Deimos-2, Dauria-DX-1, TH-1-01 and TH-1-02. The fleet will be expanded to more than 30 satellites in the coming years with the launch of Khalifa Sat, Perseus-O, Auriga and existing satellites from prospective new members.

== Programmes and applications ==
The Mohammed bin Rashid Space Center launched the Advanced Aerial Systems Programme in September 2014. The programme is aimed at developing the capabilities of the UAE for designing, manufacturing and operating advanced aerial system.

The first project under the Advance Aerial Systems Program was the development of a High Altitude Pseudo Satellite (HAPS) system in partnership with Airbus Defence and Space, one of the companies under the Airbus Group. With the use of highly advanced systems and materials, HAPS has demonstrated the ability to fly continuously for over two weeks, which is 10 times longer than any other Unmanned Aerial System (UAS) developed to date. The system provides a combination of the benefits of a satellite, in terms of altitude and applications, and an aircraft, in terms of re-usability and coverage.

The HAPS system has the ability to fly in the stratosphere at an altitude of 65,600 feet (20 km) above air traffic making it easier for different applications to work effectively. The use of the applications onboard HAPS include thermal imaging, full-HD video imaging (1080p), creation of temporary communication networks and the strengthening of navigation systems. The operational version of the aircraft is expected to go into service by the end of 2016.

MBRSC also created a "Super Resolution Tool" in May 2014. The tool has been developed by Saeed Al Mansoori, an engineer at MBRSC, and it has helped in improving the resolution of images taken by DubaiSat-1 and DubaiSat-2 by 0.75 meters. It helps in improving the details of the image when zoomed in by significantly increasing the number of pixels.

At the February 2017 World Government Summit, the United Arab Emirates announced a plan to establish a settlement on Mars by 2117, led by the Mohammed bin Rashid Space Center.

== Publication ==
The official magazine of MBRSC is called "Majarat", which is published bi-monthly and focuses on spreading knowledge about space science and technology and inspiring a new generation of United Arab Emirates for a career in space science or scientific research. The magazine is published in both Arabic and English to cater for the cosmopolitan population in the UAE, and has featured a number of notable personalities from the global space industry, including Farouk El-Baz, Carolyn Porco, Steven Squyres, Frank Drake, Noureddine Melikechi and NASA astronaut Terry Virts.

== Gallery ==
The following are some of the satellite images taken by DubaiSat-1:

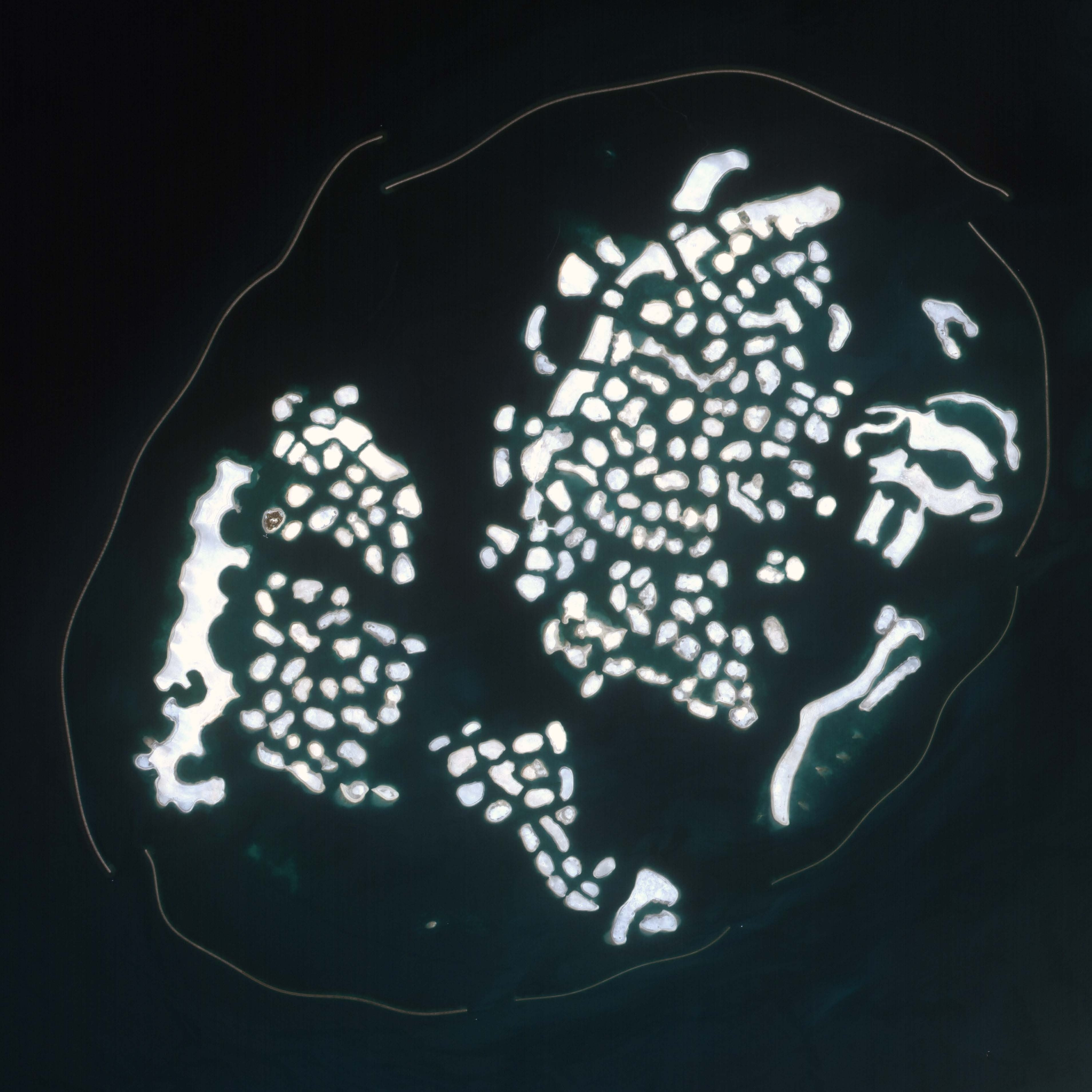
Satellite image of The World in Dubai by DubaiSat-1

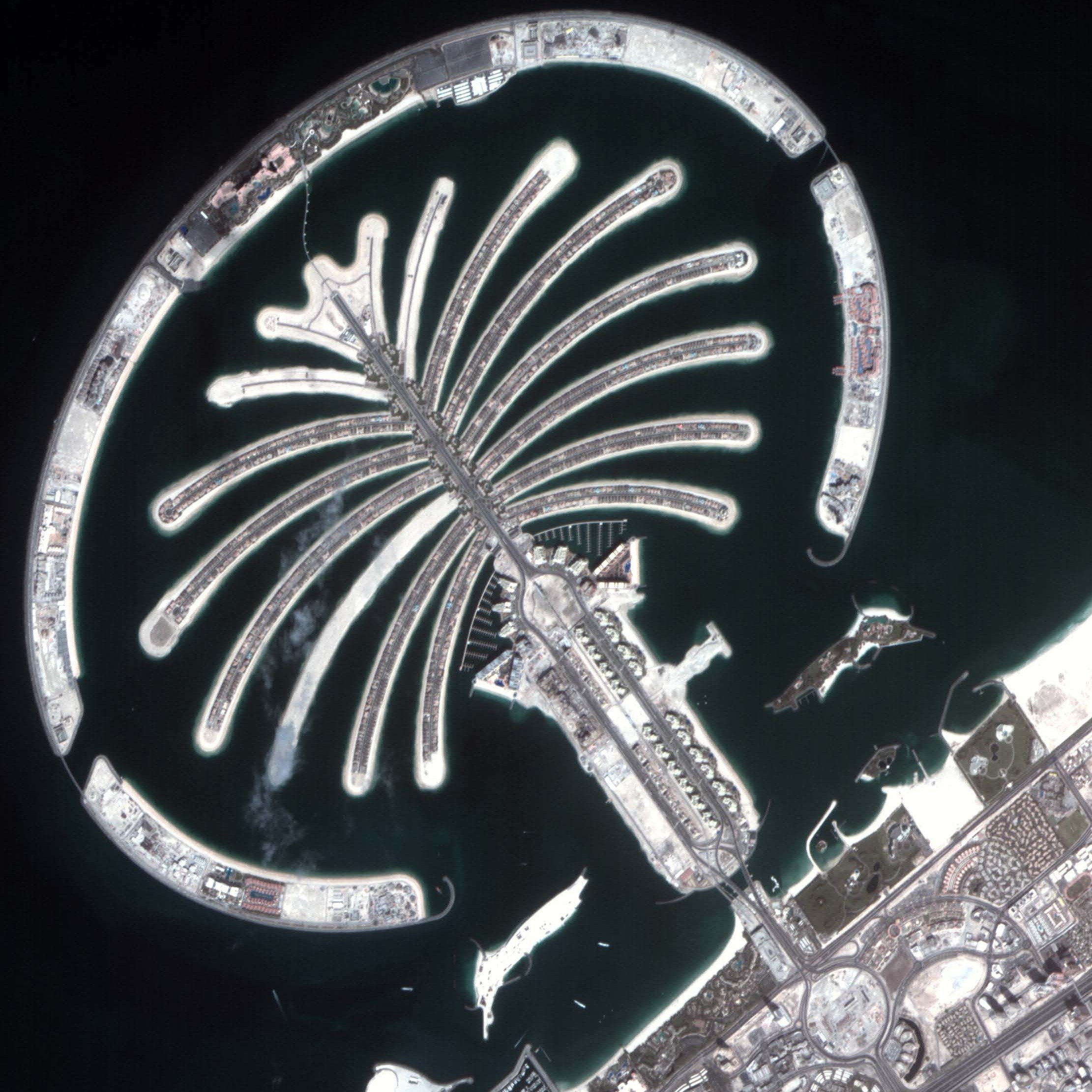
Satellite image of Palm Islands by DubaiSat-1

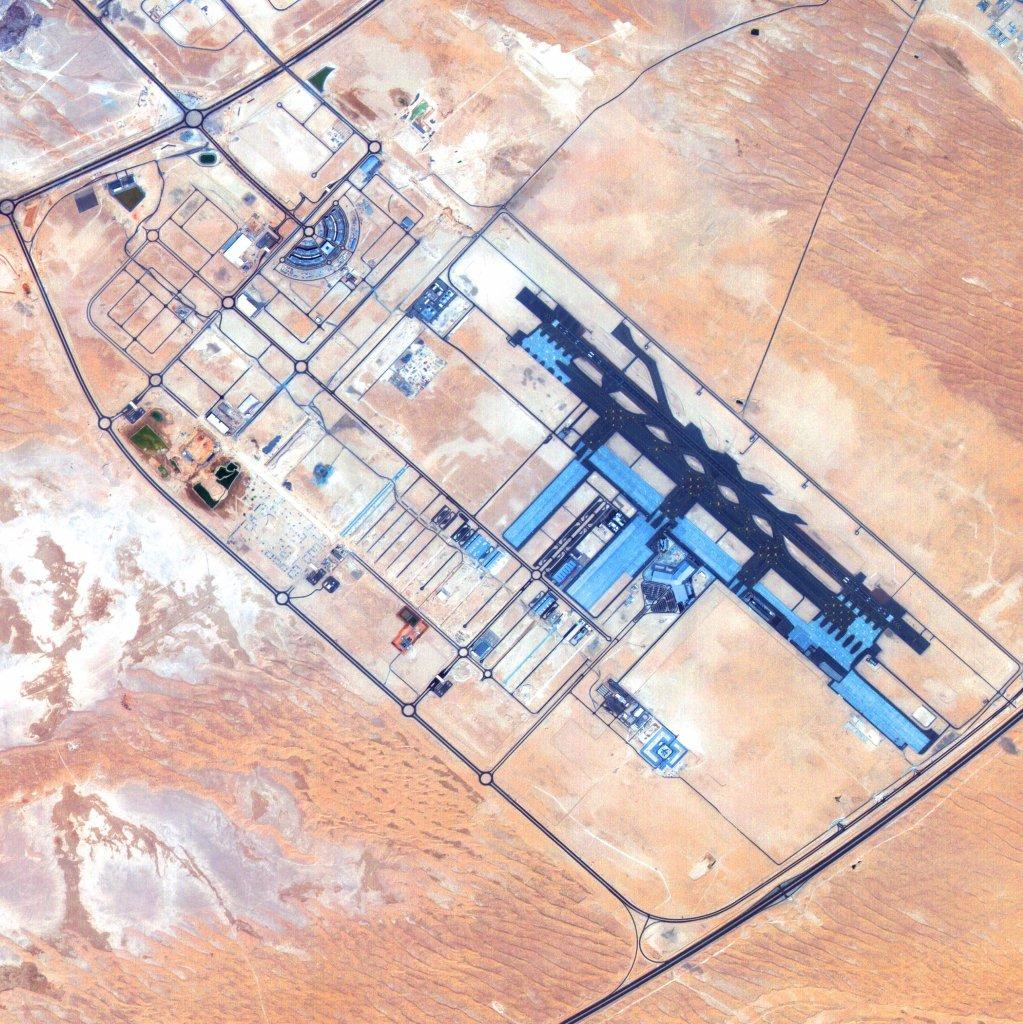
Satellite image of Al Maktoum International Airport by DubaiSat-1

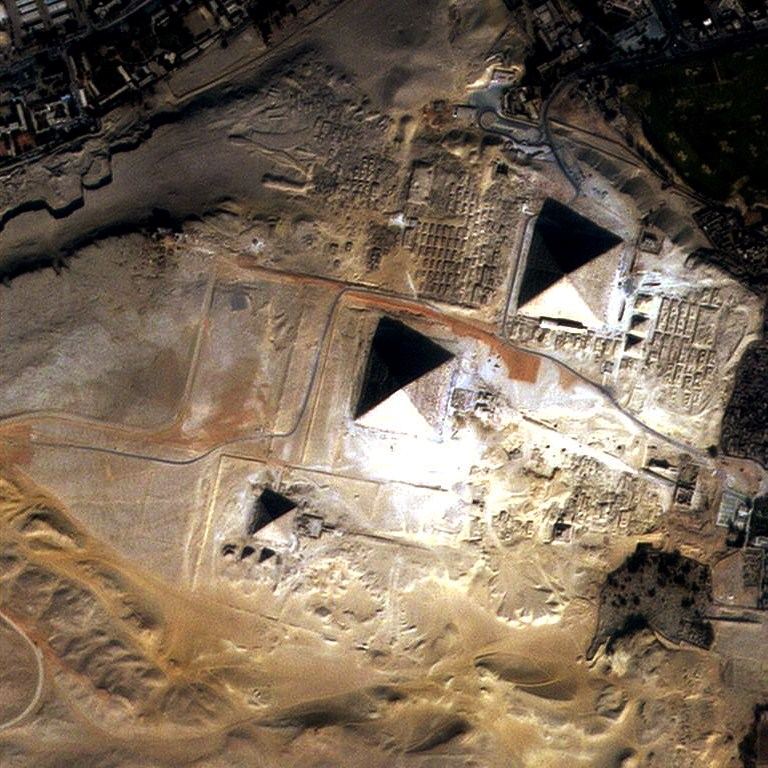
Satellite image of The Pyramids of Giza, Egypt by DubaiSat-1

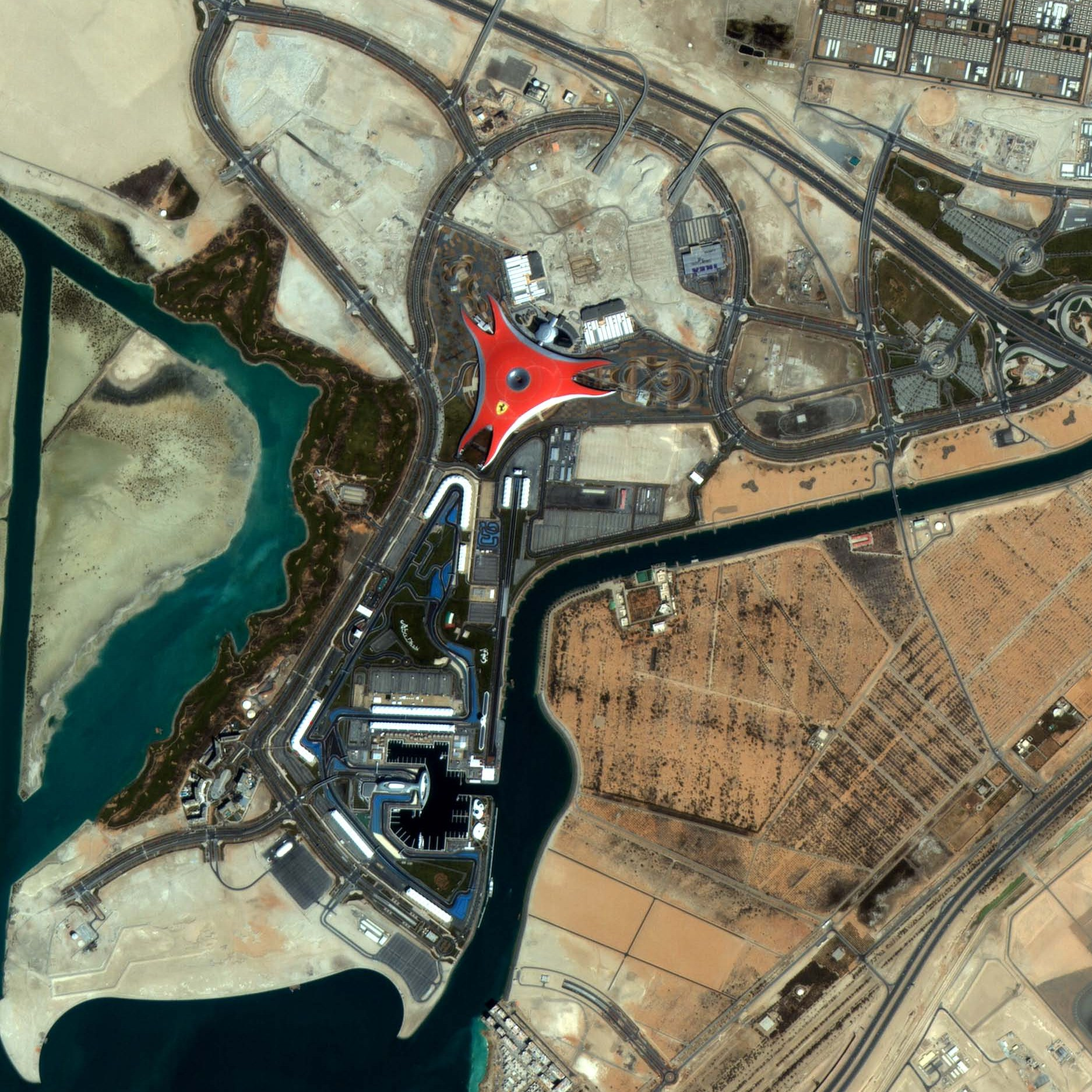
Satellite image of Ferrari World in Abu Dhabi by DubaiSat-1

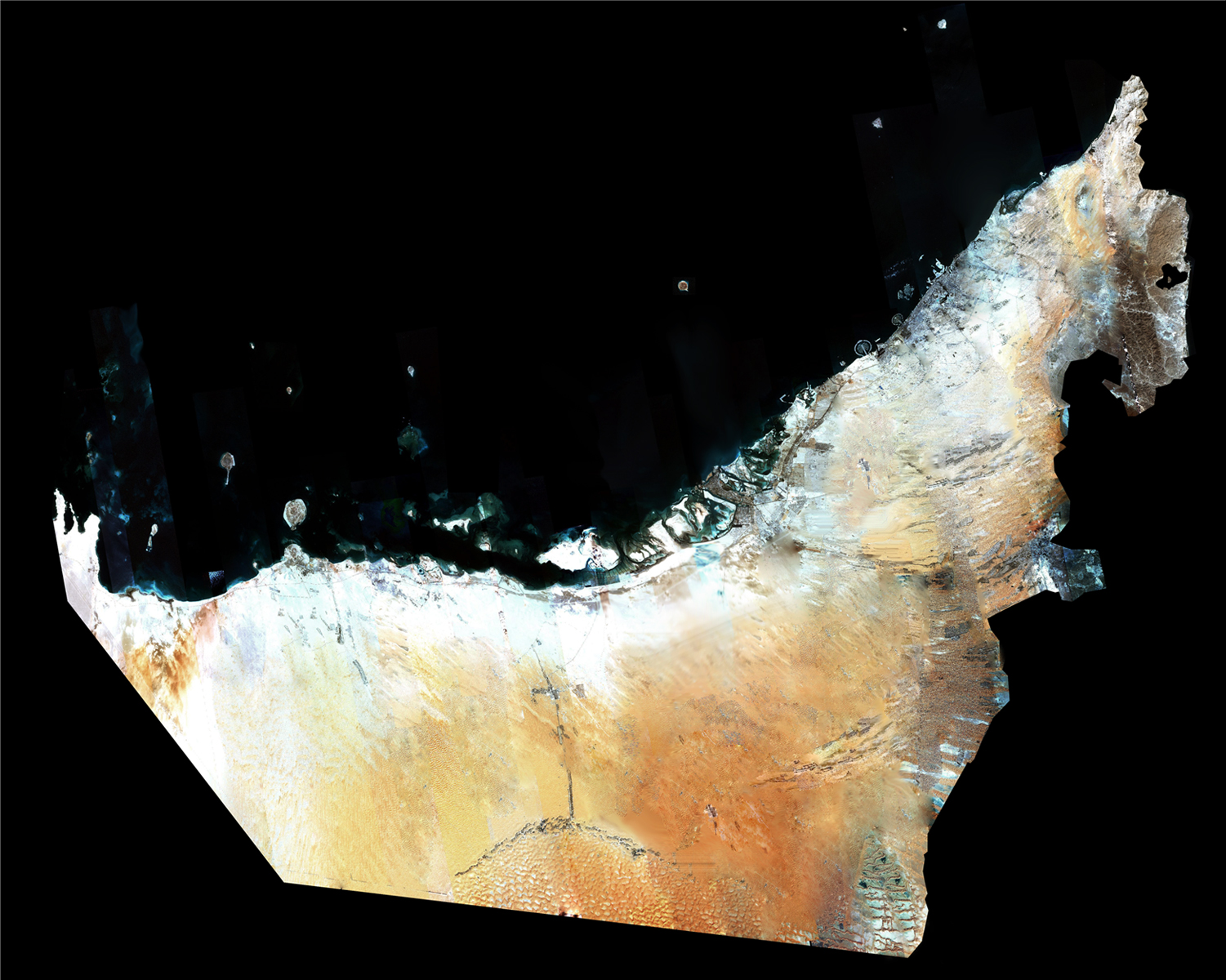
Satellite image of United Arab Emirates by DubaiSat-1

== See also ==
- United Arab Emirates Space Agency
- List of government space agencies
- List of United Arab Emirates Space Agency mission
