= KhalifaSat =

Earth observation satellite

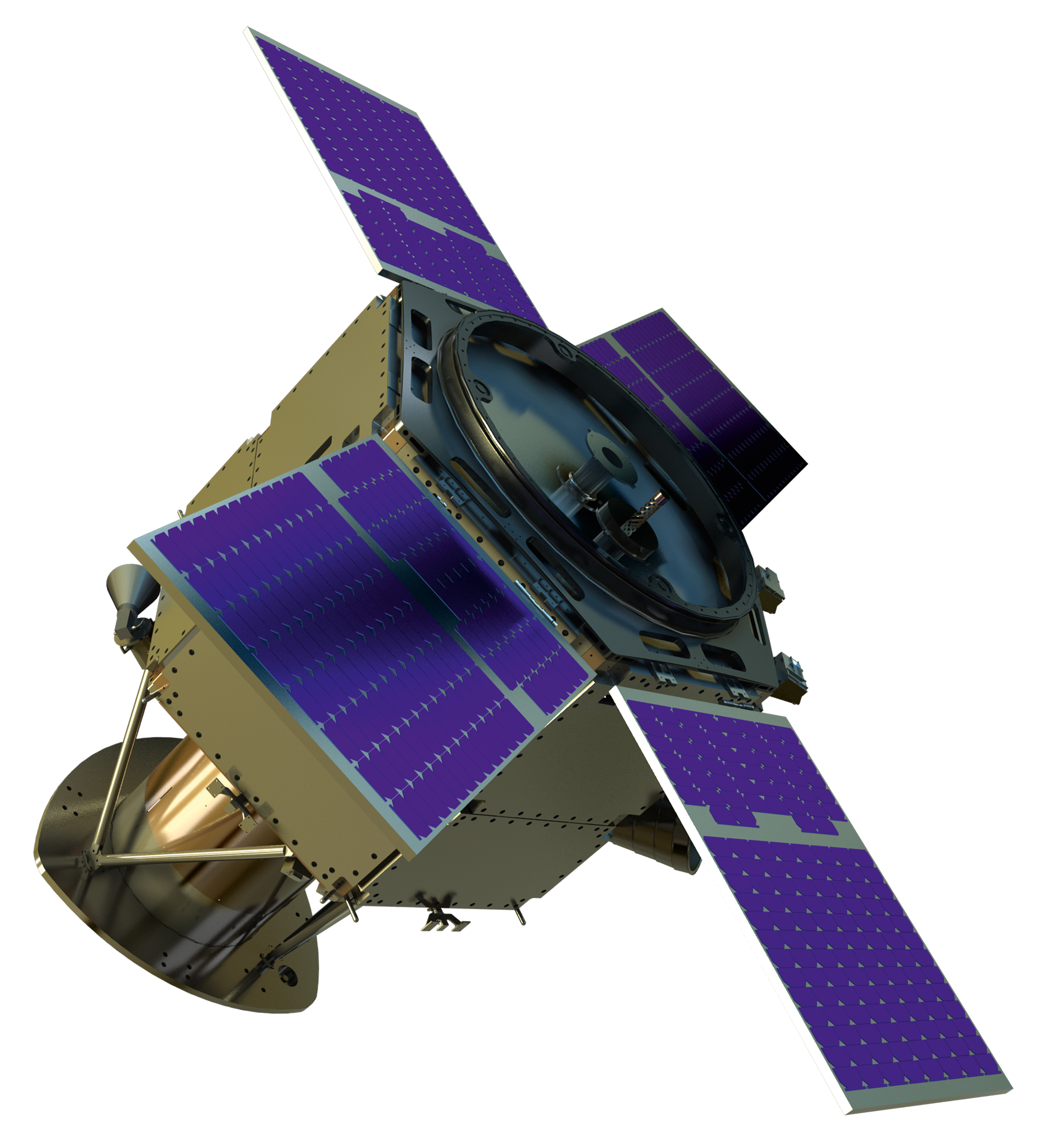
- Artist rendering of KhalifaSat
- Names: KhalifaSat, DubaiSat-3
- Mission type: Remote sensing
- Operator: MBRSC
- COSPAR ID: 2018-084F
- SATCAT no.: 43676
- Mission duration: 5 years (planned); 7 years, 6 months, 8 days (elasped)

Spacecraft properties
- Bus: SI-300
- Manufacturer: Space Technology Laboratories of MBRSC
- Launch mass: 330 kg
- Power: 450 watts

Start of mission
- Launch date: 29 October 2018, 04:08:00 UTC
- Rocket: H-IIA 202
- Launch site: Tanegashima, Yoshinobu 1
- Contractor: Mitsubishi Heavy Industries

Orbital parameters
- Reference system: Geocentric orbit
- Regime: Sun-synchronous orbit
- Altitude: 613 km
- Inclination: 98.13°

Main telescope
- Name: KhalifaSat Camera System
- Type: Pushbroom camera
- Diameter: 40 cm
- Resolution: Panchromatic: 70 cm Multispectral: 298 cm

KhalifaSat (Arabic: خليفة سات), is a remote sensing Earth observation satellite that was designed and built at the Space Technology Laboratories of the Mohammed bin Rashid Space Centre in Dubai. It is considered the first entirely Emirati-made satellite. It launched into orbit on 30 October 2018 from Japan's Tanegashima Space Center using the Korean Satrec SI-300 bus.

== Overview ==
The Mohammed bin Rashid Space Centre is a Dubai government based space centre working on the National Space programme. MBRSC already has two Earth observation satellites in orbit, DubaiSat-1 and DubaiSat-2, which were built in partnership with Satrec Initiative, a South Korean satellite manufacturer.

The project was officially announced by Sheikh Mohammed bin Rashid Al Maktoum, Vice President and Prime Minister of the United Arab Emirates (UAE), and Ruler of Dubai, in December 2013. The manufacture of KhalifaSat began in South Korea at Satrec Initiative's facilities. A team of Emirati engineers used the facilities there while the Advanced Technology Laboratories under the supervision of Korean Satrec scientists. In early 2015, the project was moved to MBRSC for the finishing touches.

== Objectives ==
KhalifaSat provides high-resolution imagery of Earth to be used for various purposes, including urban planning, change monitoring, area classification, monitoring environmental change and aiding relief efforts for natural disasters The satellite imagery from KhalifaSat will be provided to local government entities and a number of commercial entities both locally and internationally.

The MBRSC also aims to help diversify career paths for young Emiratis, along with creating a legacy for the satellite industry in UAE.

== Technical insights ==
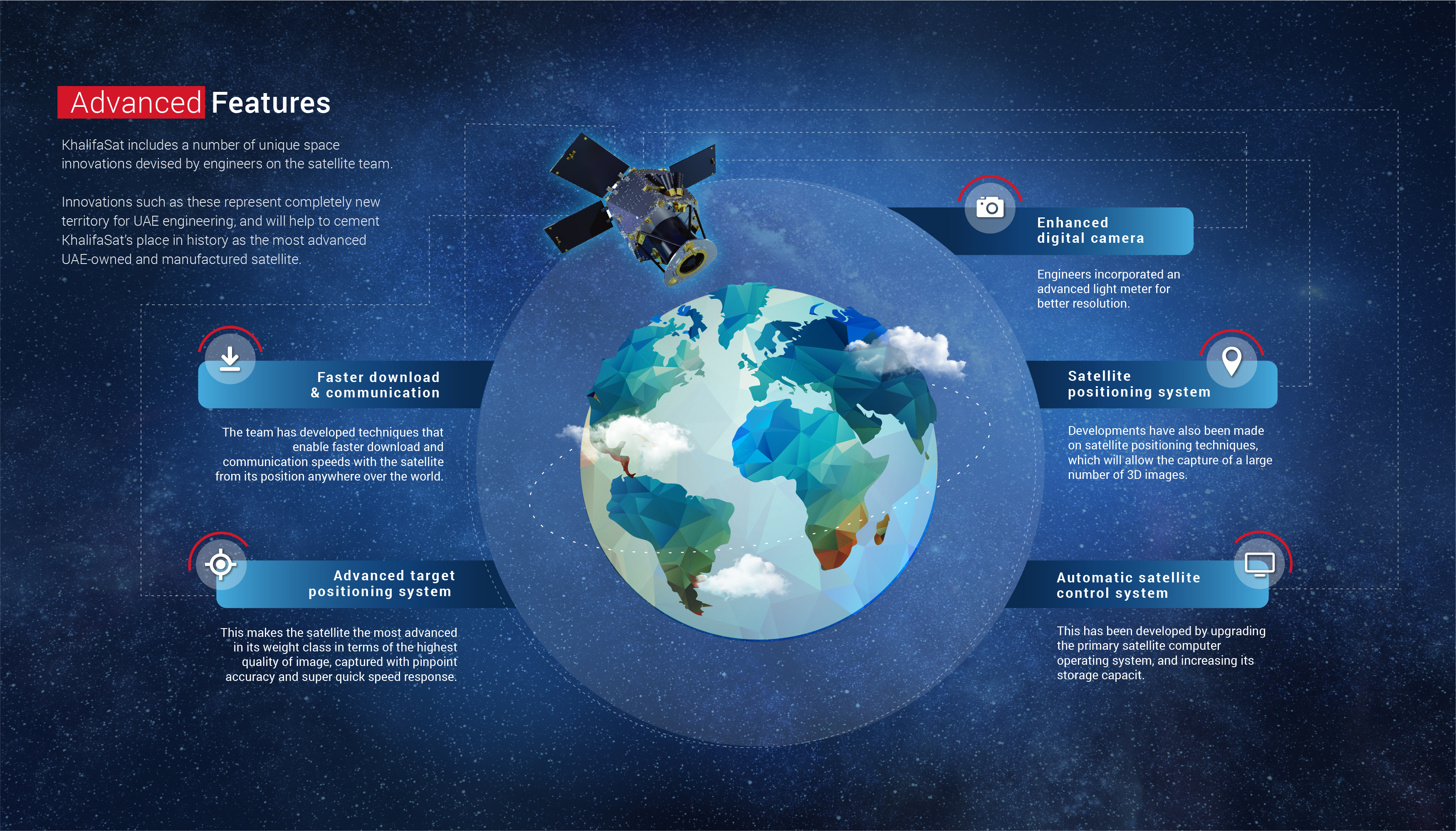
Infograph - Advanced features of KhalifaSat

KhalifaSat is hexagonal in shape with four deployable solar panels. The satellite bus comprises three decks and also an upper sun shield, which will protect the camera from temperature fluctuations and radiation. The solar panels are attached to the sides of the satellite bus structure, the frame of which is manufactured from longerons and rails.

Features	Technical Specifications
Orbit	Sun-synchronous orbit, nominal altitude: 613 km, Inclination: 98.13°
Spacecraft Mass	330 kg
Power Generated	450 watts
Mass Storage SSR (Solid State Recorder)	512 Gbit
Planned Mission Lifespan	5 years

The satellite shell is just under two metres in height and less than 1.5 metres in diameter. The total mass of the spacecraft is estimated to be around 330 kg. The most sensitive component in the satellite is its Camera System (KHCS). This will be covered with a Carbon Fibre Reinforced Polymer (CFRP) sun shield to protect it against harmful radiation.

KhalifaSat contains an advanced positioning technique that allows the capture of a large number of 3D images at once with greater accuracy and quick response.

== KhalifaSat camera system (KHCS) ==
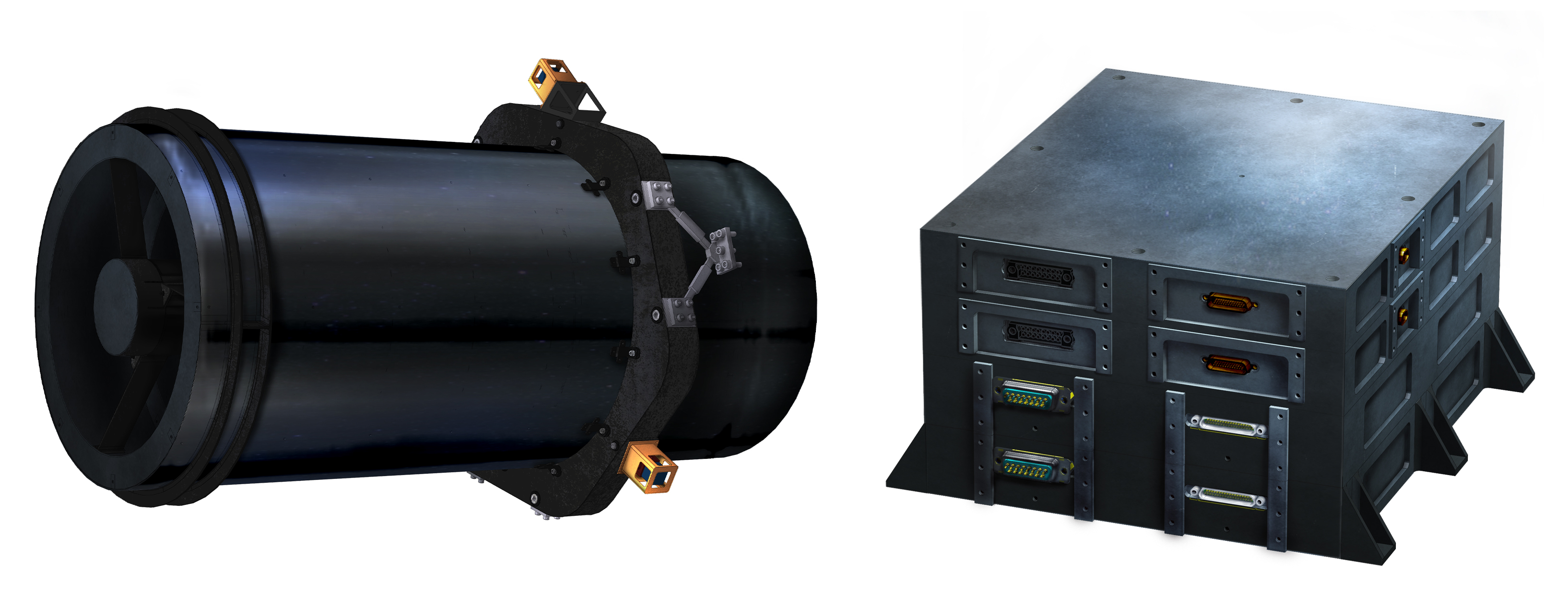
This is the Camera system of KhalifaSat, the Earth observation satellite of UAE. The instrument is pushbroom imager with 70 kg mass.

The primary payload on the satellite is the KhalifaSat Camera System, which is compact and lightweight. It includes three main subsystems: the Electro-Optical Subsystem (EOS), the Image Transmission Unit (ITU) and the Solid State Recorder (SSR).

Instrument Type	Pushbroom imager
Instrument Mass	70 kg
Power Consumption	168W
Downlink Data Transmission Speed	320 Mbit/s
Detector	TDI

The pushbroom camera has a 70 cm Ground Sampling Distance (GSD) for panchromatic imagery and 298 cm GSD in four multi-spectral bands. The multi-spectral capabilities of KhalifaSat include four channels in both the visible and near infrared spectral ranges (red, green, blue, and near infrared) with a radiometric resolution of 10 bits.

The camera system also includes a Korsch telescope, comprising a three-mirror configuration that provides the widest possible field of view and reduces optical irregularities.

=== Imaging modes ===
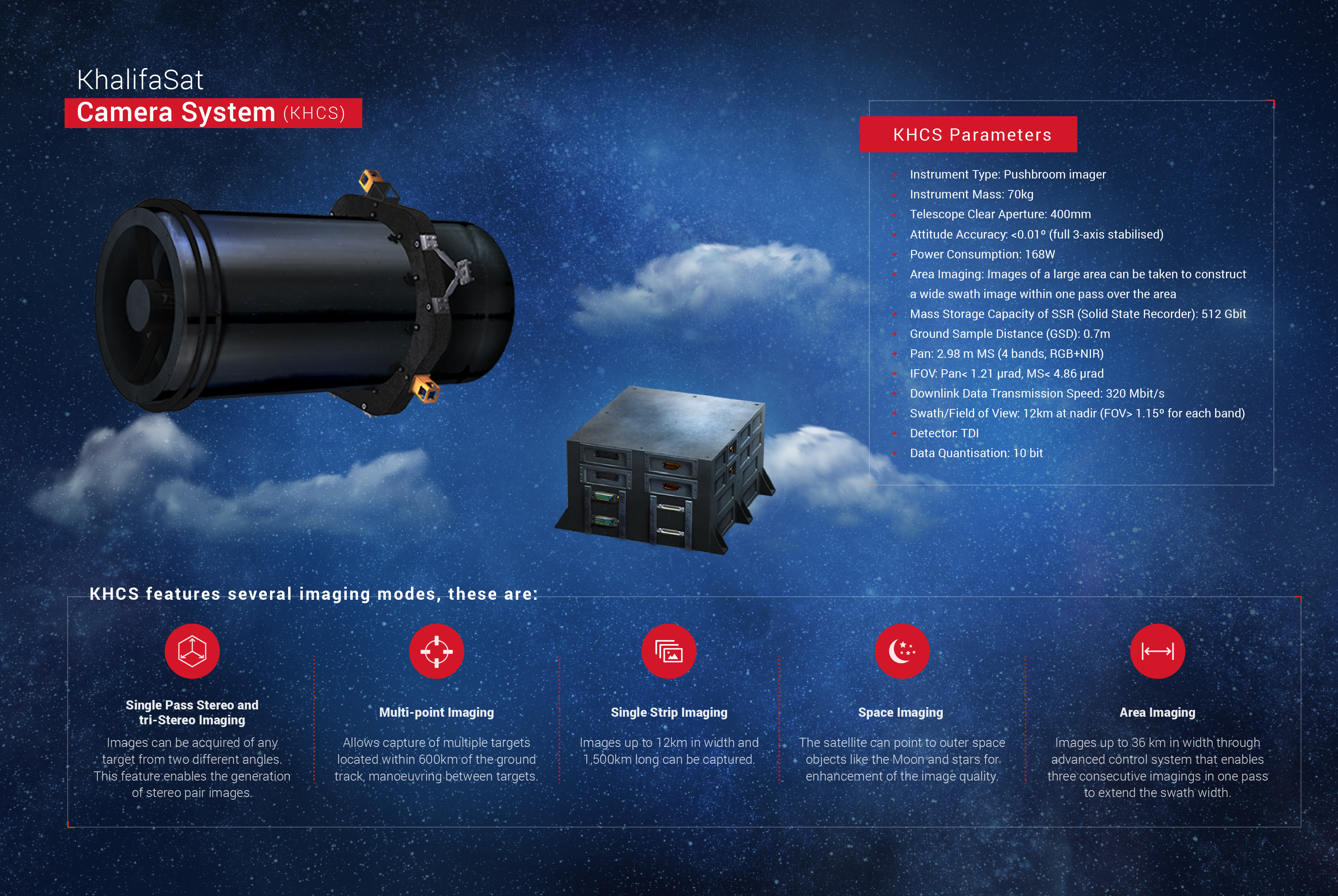
Technical specifications of KhalifaSat Camera System

The advanced camera system of KhalifaSat features several imaging modes:

Single Pass Stereo and tri-Stereo Imaging - images can be acquired of any target from two different angles. This feature enables the generation of stereo pair images.

Multi-point Imaging - allows capture of multiple targets located within 600 km of the ground track, manoeuvring between targets.

Single Strip Imaging - images up to 12 km in width and 1500 km long can be captured.

Space Imaging – the satellite can point to outer space objects like the Moon and stars for enhancement of the image quality.

Area Imaging - images up to 36 km in width through advanced control system that enables three consecutive imaging in one pass to extend the swath width.

== Critical design review ==
In January 2016, MBRSC announced that the final design completion of the engineering model of KhalifaSat had passed the Critical Design Review (CDR). This also included the approval of the proposed software and systems that will be part of the satellite. Following the successful CDR the team is now working on KhalifaSat's flight model.

== Launch window ==
MBRSC has an agreement with Mitsubishi Heavy Industries Ltd (MHI) for the launch of KhalifaSat to take place in Japan. The launch vehicle will be the H-IIA rocket and is scheduled to launch in 2018, before placing KhalifaSat into a Low Earth Orbit.

== Ground control ==
The MBRSC ground station in Dubai, UAE, will support KhalifaSat and its functions from Earth. The ground system includes three main subsystems: the Antenna and Radio Frequency (RF) subsystem, Mission Control Station (MCS), and Image Receiving and Processing Station (IRPS).

The main function of the Antenna and RF subsystem is to transmit imaging orders, give commands to the satellite, receive information and download images through the X-band feed. The MCS plans and operates the entire mission. This includes the configuration and scheduling of resources for both space and ground elements.

The IRPS provides real-time receiving and processing of downlink data. It also generates standard image products and catalogues, manages archives, and interfaces with client IRPS.

== Team ==
The satellite was developed by a team of Emirati engineers from the Mohammed Bin Rashid Space Centre. KhalifaSat project manager is Amer AlGhafri. The satellite launch manager is Abdullah Saif Harmoul while the head of the Detail Control Unit is flight software engineer Ibrahim Abdullah Almidfa.

KhalifaSat - Important Milestones

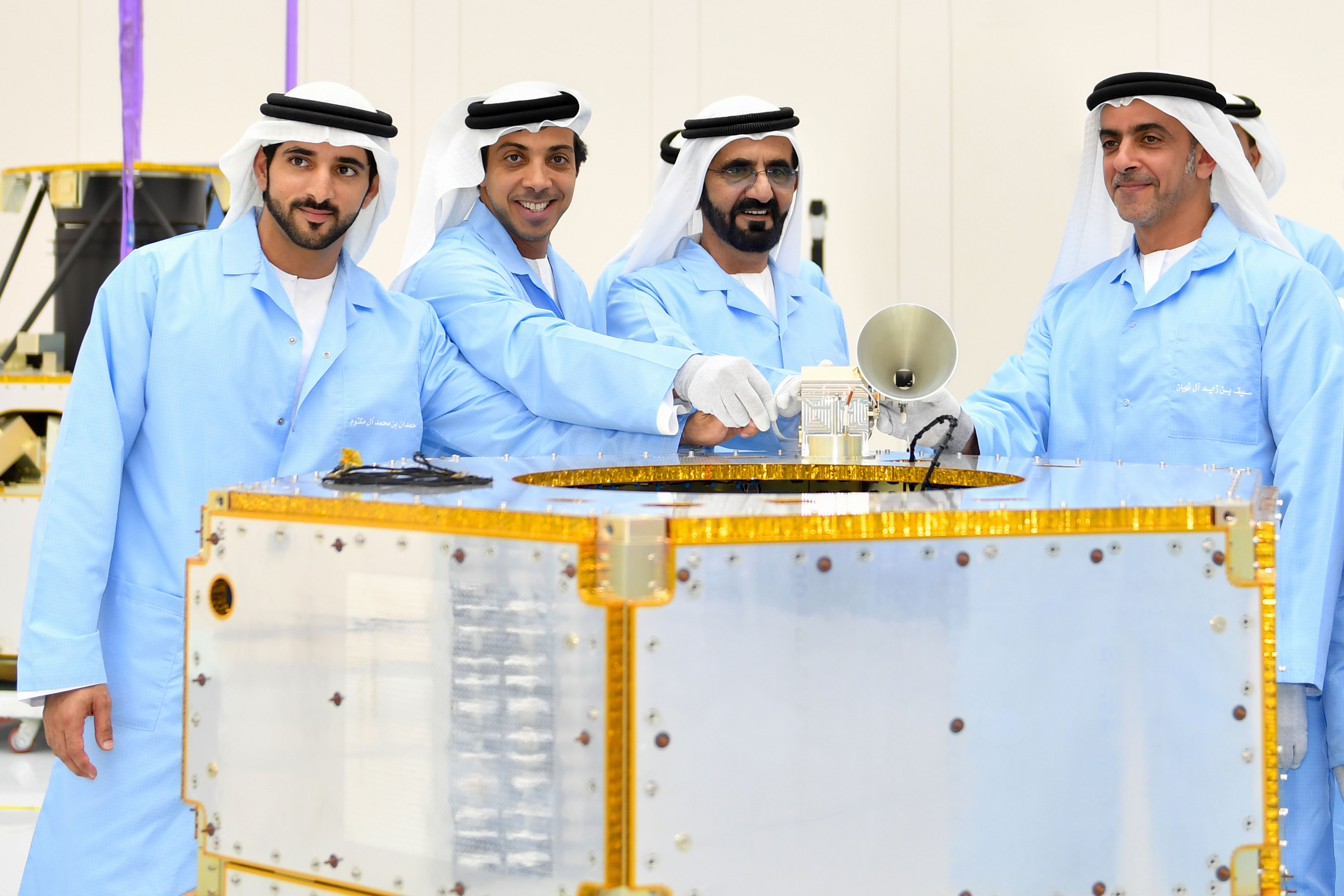
Sheikh Mohammed bin Rashid, the Vice President and Prime Minister of the UAE placing the first component on chassis of KhalifaSat - November 2016

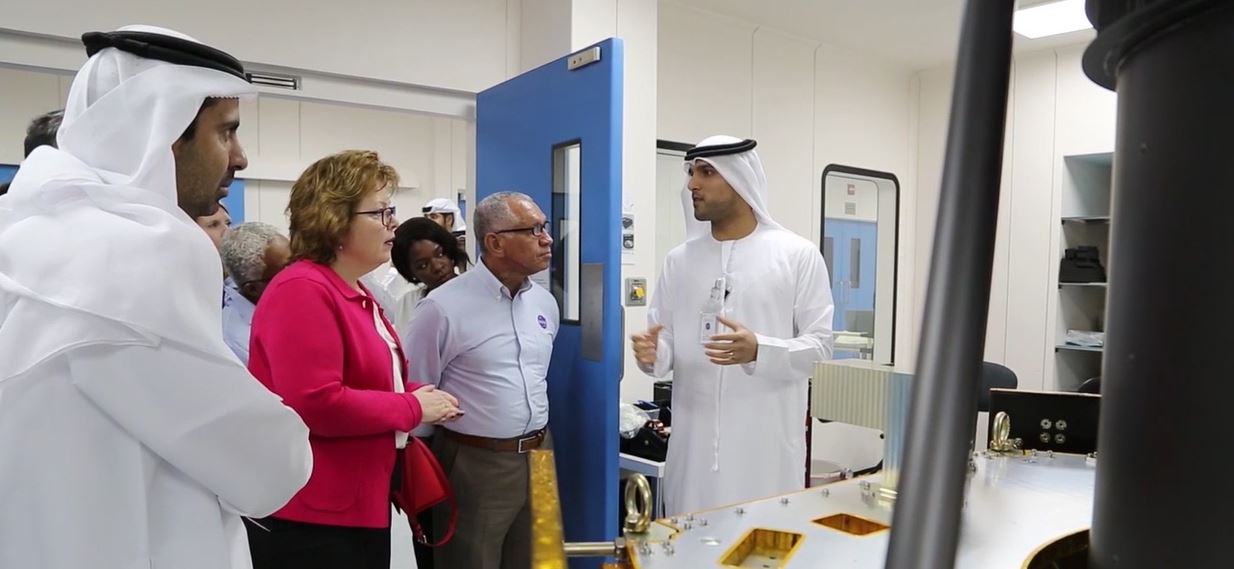
NASA's Chairman, Charles Bolden, being briefed about the KhalifaSat development during his visit to Mohammed bin Rashid Space Centre (MBRSC) - June 2016

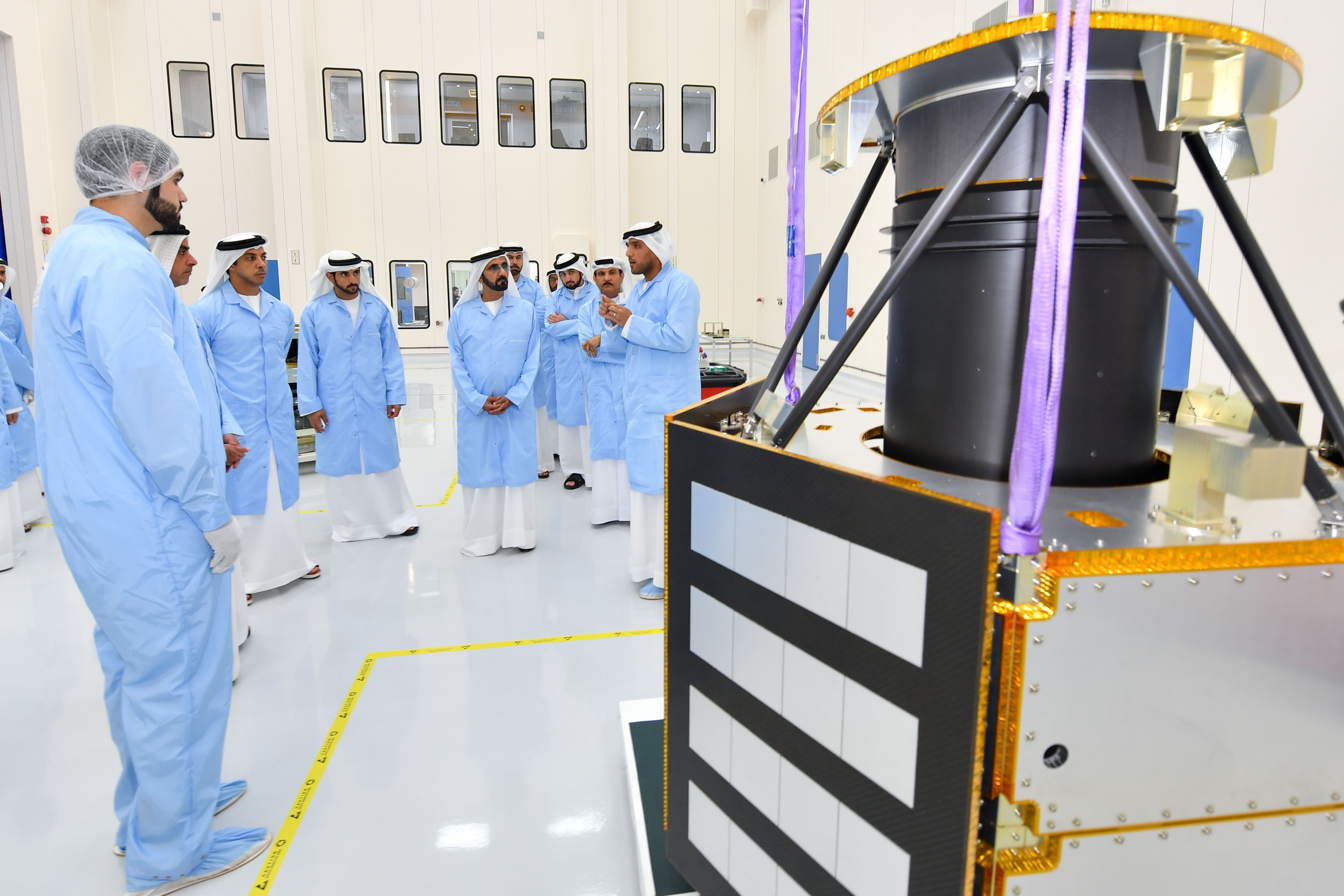
Sheikh Mohammed bin Rashid Al Maktoum being briefed on the progress of KhalifaSat's development by Amer Al Sayegh, director of MBRSC - November 2016
