= DubaiSat-2 =

Earth observation satellite

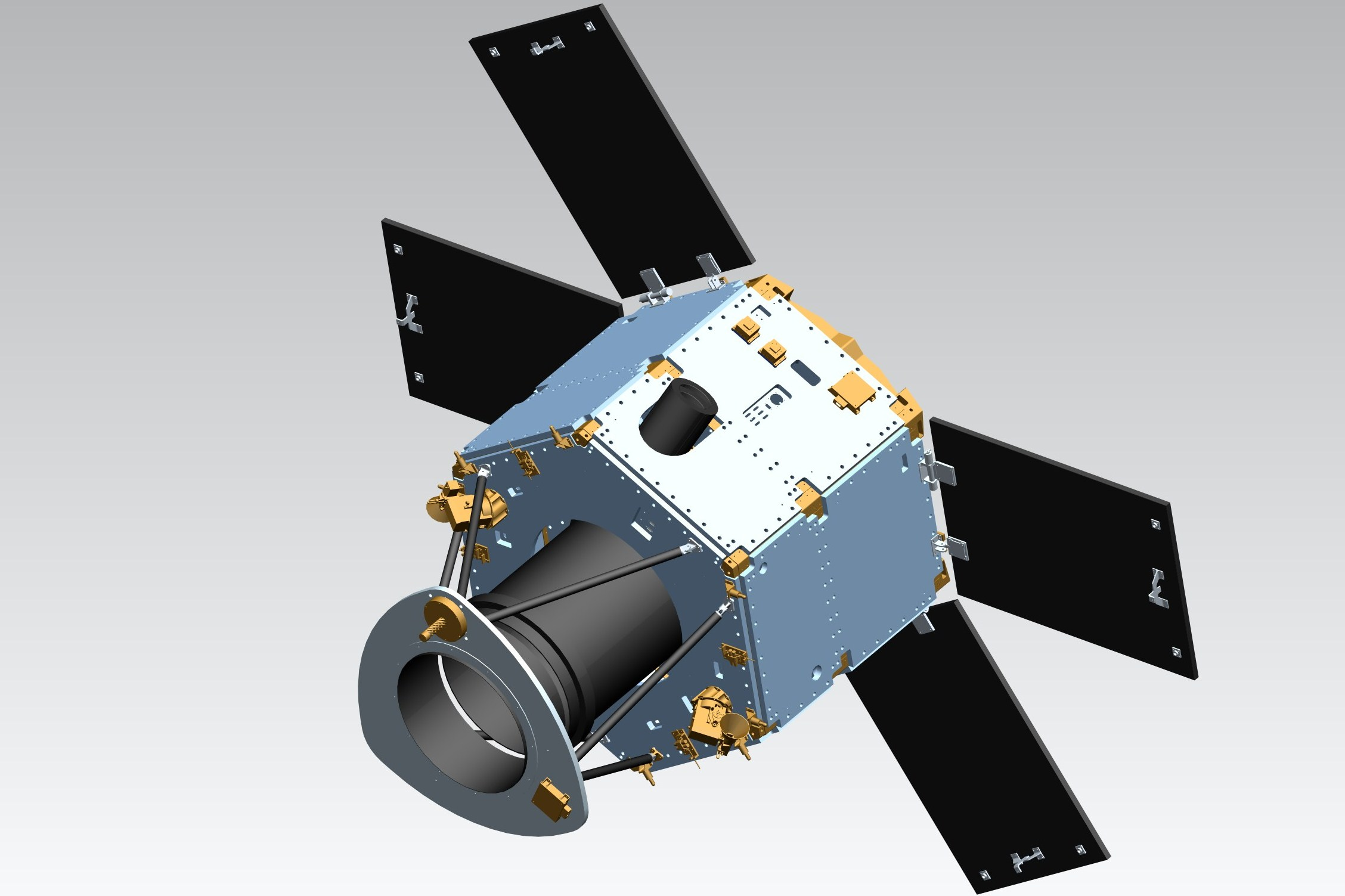
- An artist rendering of DubaiSat-2
- Mission type: Remote sensing
- Operator: Mohammed bin Rashid Space Centre
- COSPAR ID: 2013-066D
- SATCAT no.: 39419
- Mission duration: 5 years

Spacecraft properties
- Bus: SI-300
- Manufacturer: Satrec Initiative
- Launch mass: ~300 kilograms (660 lb)
- Dimensions: 1,500 by 1,950 millimetres (59 by 77 in)

Start of mission
- Launch date: 21 November 2013, 07:10:16 UTC
- Rocket: Dnepr
- Launch site: Dombarovsky 370/13
- Contractor: ISC Kosmotras

Orbital parameters
- Reference system: Geocentric
- Regime: Low Earth
- Perigee altitude: 600 kilometres (370 mi)
- Apogee altitude: 600 kilometres (370 mi)
- Inclination: 97.8 degrees
- Epoch: Planned

Main camera
- Name: HiRAIS
- Resolution: 1 metre (3 ft 3 in)

DubaiSat-2 (Arabic: دبي سات-2) is an electro-optical Earth observation satellite built by the Mohammed bin Rashid Space Centre (MBRSC) under an agreement with Satrec Initiative, a satellite manufacturing company in South Korea. MBRSC's objective with DubaiSat-2 is to provide electro-optical images, that can be commercialized, for users within the United Arab Emirates and beyond and to develop and implement new technologies not used in DubaiSat-1. MBRSC also intends to continue manpower training for the UAE's space program. 16 UAE engineers have been working on the design, development, testing and manufacturing of the satellite. The participation of the UAE engineers, who are currently working in South Korea, has increased by 100 percent from the DubaiSat-1 project.

== Overview ==
The space segment consists of a spacecraft bus and an electro-optical payload. The electro-optical payload is a push-broom camera with Time Delay Integration (TDI) sensors (1 panchromatic and 4 multi-spectral bands). DubaiSat-2 is designed for a Sun-synchronous orbit of 600 km, with a spatial resolution of 1m PAN and 4m Multispectral (MS), and a Swath of 12.2 km.

The modules in the satellite use two CAN Bus networks to communicate with each other and it has the capacity to store approximately 17,000 km^{2} of image data. It also includes an experimental propulsion system for orbit correction and maintenance. The satellite's expected lifetime is at least five years.

=== Space segment ===
DubaiSat-2 has a hexagonal shape. The mechanical bus consists of 2 decks and an upper sun shield to protect the cold propellants from solar and Earth radiation. The electronics are distributed on the decks and on the side panels. Four solar panels are attached to the sides of the satellite. Longerons and rails make up the bus structure frame. On the top, carbon-fiber-reinforced polymer (CFRP) struts hold the Sun shield at the baffle of the High Resolution Advanced Imaging System (HiRAIS). The High-Resolution Imaging System is attached to the bus at the internal deck. The mechanical configuration of the satellite is less than 2000 mm in height and less than 1500 mm in diameter. The total mass of the satellite is less than 300 kg.

The power system supplies and controls the required voltage levels and current essential for satellite operation during its mission. The power system uses a rechargeable Li-ion battery to provide power for the satellite's payload and other subsystems. The system is divided into two stages, first is the charging stage and the second is the discharging stage. The charging stage is made of a solar power generator and power regulator. DubaiSat-2 generates more than 450W of power using four solar panels. Each solar panel contains 6 arrays and each array consists of 26 cells. The solar panels charge the batteries. The battery charging process is handled and regulated by the Battery Charging Regulators modules. DubaiSat-2 has three battery charging regulators with hot redundancy configuration which seamlessly take over if the primary battery charging regulator fails. The spacecraft can function normally with only two battery charging regulators.

==== Mission payload ====
The High-Resolution Advanced Imaging System (HiRAIS) is the primary payload of Dubaisat-2. It is an advanced Earth observation Camera which captures high resolution images and is capable of other functions such as high-speed data transmission. The HiRAIS is a compact and light weight instrument; and is built from a composite material to obtain high strength while keeping its weight down. The camera is based on a Korsch optical design which uses a three-mirror configuration to reduce optical irregularities and provides a wide field of view.

The HiRAIS consists of three main units: the Electro-Optical Subsystem, the Solid-State Recorder Unit, and the Image Transmission Unit. The Electro-Optical Subsystem is composed of the telescope, an auxiliary camera module, and a Focal Plane Assembly which are all integrated into one system. It is a pushbroom type camera with a 1-meter Ground Sampling Distance (GSD) for panchromatic imagery and 4 meter GSD in four multispectral bands.

The Solid-State Recorder Unit handles the processing, storage and maintenance of image data and is capable of storing image data received from the Focal Plane Assembly during the imaging mode. It is also responsible for image data compressing, encrypting and encoding before sending it to the Image Transmission Unit during downloading mode. The unit has a storage capacity of 256 Gbit arranged in 4 identical storage boards.

The Image Transmission Unit provides transmission of X-band data at a rate of 160 Mbit/s. It is divided into two main components: X-band Transmitter Unit and a high gain X-band Antenna.

==== Propulsion system ====
DubaiSat-2 is equipped with a Hall-effect thruster. It is an electrical propulsion system with Xenon gas fuel and microwave cathode. The system will be used for the satellite's orbit correction and maintenance.

=== Ground segment ===
DubaiSat-2 ground system consists of the Main Mission Control Station, the Subsidiary Mission Control Station, the Main Image Receiving and Processing Station, Customer Image Receiving and Processing Station, and the Antenna system.

The ground station monitors and controls the satellite. From there satellite operation planning is conducted, which includes imaging and download scenarios, mission timelines, orbit maintenance operation, and image downloads. The ground station is located at MBRSC's premises in Dubai, United Arab Emirates.

== Launch ==
DubaiSat-2 was successfully launched by a Dnepr rocket operated by Kosmotras of the Russian Federation. It has been placed into a polar Sun-synchronous orbit at an altitude of 600 km and local UAE time of descending node of 10:30 am. Initially set for the last quarter of 2012, the launch took place at 07:10:16 UTC on 21 November 2013. Thirty one other satellites were deployed by the rocket, with an additional payload remaining attached to the upper stage. The revisit time for a ground location will be 8 days maximum. The tilting capability of DubaiSat-2 can go up to ±45° roll tilt, ±30° pitch tilt.

== Future plans ==
In 2018, DubaiSat-2 and its predecessor, DubaiSat-1, was joined and will work together with UAE's third satellite, KhalifaSat.

== See also ==
- Emirates Institution for Advanced Science and Technology
- Khalifa Sat
- DubaiSat-1
