= Satrec Initiative =

South Korean aerospace company

Satrec Initiative Co., Ltd.
- Native name: 주식회사 쎄트렉아이
- Company type: Public
- Traded as: KRX: 099320
- Industry: Aerospace; Defense
- Founded: 29 December 1999; 26 years ago
- Founder: Choi Soon-dal; Park Seong-dong; Kim Byeong-jin
- Headquarters: 21, Yuseong-daero 1628beon-gil, Yuseong-gu, Daejeon, South Korea
- Area served: Worldwide
- Key people: Kim I-eul (CEO)
- Products: Satellites; Secure satellite Imaging systems; Mobile ground receiving processing systems; UAV ground control systems
- Revenue: ▲ ₩91.4 billion (2022)
- Operating income: ▼ ₩−77 billion (2022)
- Net income: ▼ ₩−28 billion (2022)
- Total assets: ▲ ₩258.8 billion (2022)
- Total equity: ▲ ₩121.2 billion (2022)
- Owner: Hanwha Aerospace (36.31%); Park Seong-dong (10.45%); Employee stock ownership (1.83%); Other (0.12%)
- Number of employees: 383 (2024)
- Website: Official website in English; Official website in Korean

- Satrec Initiative
- Hangul: 쎄트렉아이
- RR: Sseteurek ai
- MR: Sset'ŭrek ai

Satrec Initiative Co., Ltd. (Satrec I; Korean: 쎄트렉아이) or SI is a South Korean satellite manufacturing company headquartered in Daejeon, South Korea The company was founded in 1999 by the engineers who developed the first Korean satellite (KITSAT-1) at KAIST SaTRec (Satellite Technology Research Center). The company designs and builds Earth observation satellites called SpaceEye-series, and it provides various space components, including high resolution electro-optical payloads and star-trackers. SI's first satellite was a Malaysian Earth observation satellite, RazakSAT launched in 2009. SI has two subsidiaries: SI Imaging Services (SIIS) is the exclusive image data provider of KOMPSAT-series, and SI Analytics (SIA) provides AI-native GEOINT solutions for satellite imagery. SI also used a spin-off process to establish the SI Detection (SID) company which provides radiation monitoring solutions.

== History ==
Satrec Initiative was founded in Daejeon, South Korea in 1999. There are two subsidiaries established based on SI's business in the remote-sensing satellite. One is SI Imaging Service (SIIS) founded in 2014, and they provide very high resolution optical and SAR images obtained from KOMPSAT-series and DubaiSat-2. Second subsidiary is SI Detection, and they develops and provides state-of-art radiation detectors derived from spacecraft radiation detecting systems.

== Satellites and launches ==
- KOMPSAT-1 (1999): image receiving and processing station
- STSat-1 (2003)
- KOMPSAT-2 (2006): image receiving and processing station
- RazakSAT (2009): satellite and ground systems
- DubaiSat-1 (2009): satellite and ground systems
- COMS-1 (2010): communication payload integration, electrical modules, Sun sensor, image receiving and processing station, and mission control subsystems
- RASAT (2011): Electro-optics (EO) payload and attitude sensors
- X-Sat (2011): EO payload
- KOMPSAT-3 (2012): image receiving and processing station, mission control subsystems, and Sun sensor
- Göktürk-2 (2012): EO payload
- KOMPSAT-5 (2013): fixed/mobile image receiving and processing station, mission control subsystems, SAR simulator, and Sun sensor
- DubaiSat-2 (2013): satellite and ground systems
- Deimos-2 (2013): satellite and ground systems
- KOMPSAT-3A (2015): fixed/mobile image receiving and processing station and Sun sensor
- TeLEOS-1 (2015): EO payload
- Velox-C1 (2015)
- KhalifaSat (2018): electric modules, telescope, and image receiving and processing station
- GEO-KOMPSAT-2A/B (2018/2020): electric modules, space weather sensor, image receiving and processing station, and mission control subsystems
- CAS500-1 (2021)

== Platforms ==
=== SpaceEye-X ===
SpaceEye-X is a satellite bus, which was originally designed to carry very high resolution optical payload(<0.5 m resolution). SpaceEye-X provides the capability to accommodate various payloads, including SAR antennas.

=== SpaceEye-1 ===
SpaceEye-1 is an improved model and advanced variant of the SI-300 satellite bus, which was the platforms of DubaiSat-2 and DEIMOS-2. Current model is optimized for Earth observation purposes (<1 m resolution).

=== SpaceEye-W ===
SpaceEye-W is a mini-satellite platform (100 kg class). This platform has a very flexible configuration; it can support assorted missions from technical demonstration and science missions to Earth observation missions and telecommunications.

=== SpaceEye-T ===
SpaceEye-T is a 700 kg class satellite platform that will form the basis for SI's own Earth observation satellite constellation. It will offer an optical payload with 30-cm resolution and 12 km swath width. The satellite was launched on 15 March 2025 as part of the SpaceX Transporter-13 rideshare mission.

== Subsystem-level products ==
=== Electric Propulsion Systems ===
SI provides Hall-effect electric propulsion systems (HEPS) optimized for small satellite missions. They provide power processing units, propellant feeding units, and Hall effect thrusters with various power consumption range. HEPS has been acquired flight heritages; DubaiSat-2 and DEIMOS-2 equipped HEPS-200 (200 W power consumption).

=== Products ===
- Star tracker
- S-band transceiver
- X-band transmitter
- Steerable X-band antenna
- Command and Data Handling Unit
- Solid-state recorder
- Sun sensor
