= DubaiSat-1 =

Earth observation satellite

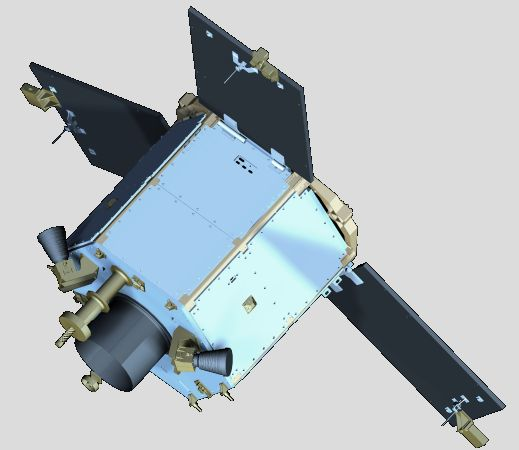
- An artist rendering of DubaiSat-1
- Mission type: Remote sensing
- Operator: Mohammed bin Rashid Space Centre
- COSPAR ID: 2009-041B
- SATCAT no.: 35682
- Mission duration: 6 years and 22 days

Spacecraft properties
- Bus: SI-200
- Manufacturer: Satrec Initiative, South Korea
- Launch mass: 190 kg
- Dimensions: 1200 x 1200 mm (hexagonal)
- Power: 330 watts

Start of mission
- Launch date: 29 July 2009, 18:46:00 UTC
- Rocket: Dnepr
- Launch site: Baikonur, Site 109/95
- Contractor: ISC Kosmotras

End of mission
- Last contact: 21 August 2015

Orbital parameters
- Reference system: Geocentric
- Regime: Sun-Synchronous
- Perigee altitude: 666 km
- Apogee altitude: 681 km
- Inclination: 98.13°
- Period: 98.21 minutes
- Epoch: 29 July 2009

Main camera
- Name: Dubai Medium Aperture Camera (DMAC)
- Wavelengths: Pan: 420-720 nm MS1: 420-510 nm (blue); MS2: 510-580 nm (green); MS3: 600-720 nm (red); MS4: 760-890 nm (near infrared)
- Resolution: 2.5 m (Pan); 5 m (MS)

DubaiSat-1 (Arabic: دبي سات-1) is a remote sensing Earth observation satellite built by the Mohammed bin Rashid Space Centre (MBRSC) under an agreement with Satrec Initiative, a satellite manufacturing company in South Korea.

DubaiSat-1 was launched on 29 July 2009 into a 680 km altitude Sun-synchronous polar orbit from the Baikonur launch site in Kazakhstan, along with several other satellites on board the Dnepr launch vehicle.

== Overview ==
An external view of DubaiSat-1 and coordinate system.

DubaiSat-1's DMAC Mechanical Structure.

DubaiSat-1 observes the earth at a Low Earth orbit (LEO) and generates high-resolution optical images at 2.5 m in panchromatic (black-and-white) and at 5 m in multispectral (colour) bands. These images provide decision makers in the UAE as well as MBRSC clients with a valuable tool for a wide range of applications including infrastructure development, urban planning, and environment monitoring and protection. DubaiSat-1 images are also useful for promoting geosciences and remote sensing research in the region, and for supporting different scientific disciplines in private and academic sectors.

For example, DubaiSat-1 images have been used, to monitor progress on The World megaproject, Palm Islands, and the Al Maktoum International Airport.

The United Nations also used DubaiSat-1 images to monitor relief efforts following the 2011 Tōhoku earthquake and tsunami in Japan.

The satellite accommodates two main payloads. The primary payload is the Dubai Medium Aperture Camera (DMAC), and the secondary and experimental payload, the Space Radiation Monitor (SRM).

The DMAC system is pushbroom imaging system with one panchromatic and four multi-spectral imaging channels. It also consists of an Electro-Optical Subsystem and the Payload Management Subsystem. The Electro-Optical Subsystem has a telescope, a focal plane assembly, and a Signal Processing Module. The Payload Management Subsystem consists of the Thermal and Power Module and the Mass storage and Control Module.

The Space Radiation Monitor, the secondary and experimental payload, is capable of measuring the total ionizing dose from the charged particles at the orbits of satellites. The instrument utilizes four p-type Metal-Oxide-Semiconductor Field Effects Transistors (MOSFETs). These devices measure the current-voltage characteristics of the satellite. Subsequent analysis will allow measurements of the amount of cumulative ionizing dose, and of the total ionizing dose of the devices.

== Structure ==
DubaiSat-1 has a hexagonal body with three deployable solar panels. The frame includes spacecraft adaptors, six longerons, rails, an inner ring that provides rigidity and stability of the satellite's camera, inner rods and three decks. Three spacecraft adaptors connect with shear brackets and mechanically couple the satellite and separation adaptor of the launch vehicle, the Dnepr rocket. Each one of the spacecraft adaptors has separation sensors to monitor the separation condition between the satellite and the launch vehicle. The umbilical connector attaches on the lower surface of the bottom deck with its mounting support bracket.

== Ground Station Components ==
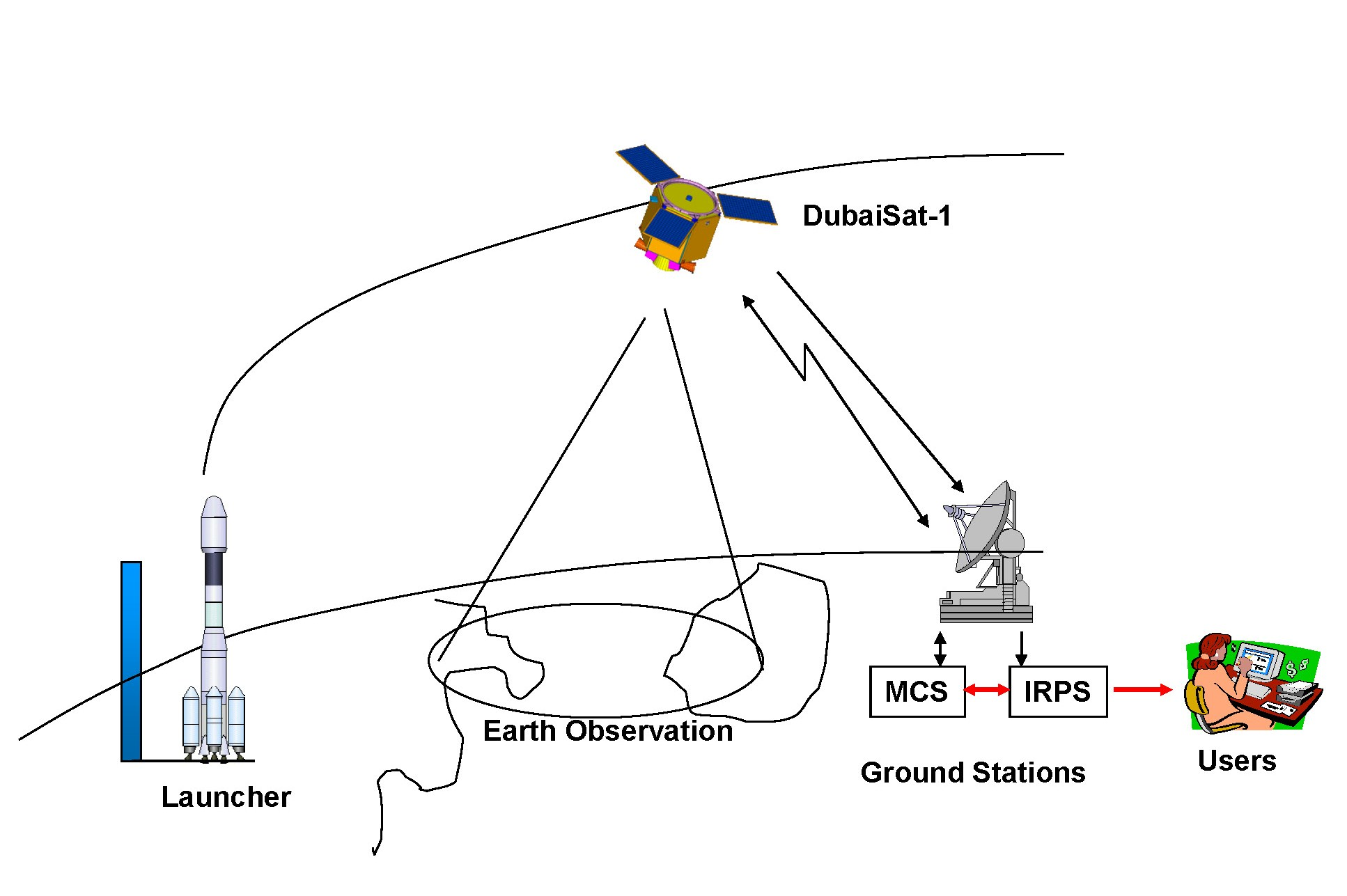
The ground station components of DubaiSat-1.

MBRSC's Ground Station is located in Dubai, and is the only ground system supporting the DubaiSat-1 mission. The ground system consists of three main subsystems:

=== Antenna and RF Subsystem ===
The Antenna and RF subsystem consists of a Viasat 11.28 metre antenna system incorporating an S-band transmitter feed, an S-band receiver feed, an X-band receiver feed, and a tracking system. The RF equipment is used to communicate with the satellite. It receives X-band RF signals and performs RF processing. It also produces a demodulated and bit-synchronized data stream from X-band signals. In general, its purpose is to transmit imaging orders and command the satellite through the S-band transmitter feed; receive information and health status from the satellite through the S-band receiver feed; and download the images through the X-band feed.

=== Mission Control Station ===
From the Mission Control Station, MBRSC staff plan and operate the entire space mission, including the configuration and scheduling of resources for both space and ground elements. It also monitors and commands the satellite.

=== Image Receiving and Processing Station ===
The third component of the ground system is the Image Receiving and Processing Station (IRPS). The IRPS receives and processes the X-band downlink data in real-time. This includes generation of standard image products and catalogues for integration with system management; for archive management; and for comprehensive user interface to provide easy access to satellite image data.

The IRPS is located at MBRSC's ground station in Dubai. It has a direct interface with the main mission control station and it generates schedule requests which includes imaging and download schedules. It also archives image and ancillary data for product generation and distribution.

== Applications ==
=== Infrastructure development ===
Satellite imagery provides an alternative way of looking at the world. It can add significant incremental data useful in a wide range of applications. The high-resolution spatial images can complement the existing geographic information system databases too.

DubaiSat-1 images support infrastructure development in the UAE and the Persian Gulf region. These images assist decision makers involved in urban and rural planning, transportation, utilities and mapping. Some images were also useful for monitoring progress on the Dubai World Megaproject, Palm Islands and the Al Maktoum International Airport.

=== Environmental ===
Many environmental and meteorological events such as vegetation stress, fog, land degradation, sandstorms, desertification and droughts cannot be captured by ground measurements alone, making remote sensing an important tool in environmental monitoring. The sun-synchronous orbit of DubaiSat-1 merges with data from geostationary missions to provide enhancements on existing models.

Additionally, due to their low precipitation rates, arid regions are the world's major source of atmospheric dust that affects local, regional and global climate. Dust and sand storms create potentially hazardous air quality for humans, and adversely affect climate on regional and worldwide scales. Remote sensing is a demonstrably valuable tool for detecting, mapping and forecasting such events. However, arid and semi arid regions have their own specific and unique characteristics and vulnerabilities that require special attention when adapting existing remote sensing tools efficiently. Satellite imaging helps monitor and improve management of the world's agricultural resources. Multispectral images contribute by monitoring land use, generating vegetation indices, and monitoring water quality.

=== Disaster relief ===
Satellite images are useful tools to assist disaster relief teams to determine how to tackle rescue and recovery efforts in the wake of catastrophic natural, or even man-made, events. In the aftermath of the tsunami in Japan on March 11, 2011, MBRSC applied DubaiSat-1 to help disaster relief teams determine and manage the scale of the event.

== Gallery ==
The following are some of the satellite images taken by DubaiSat-1:

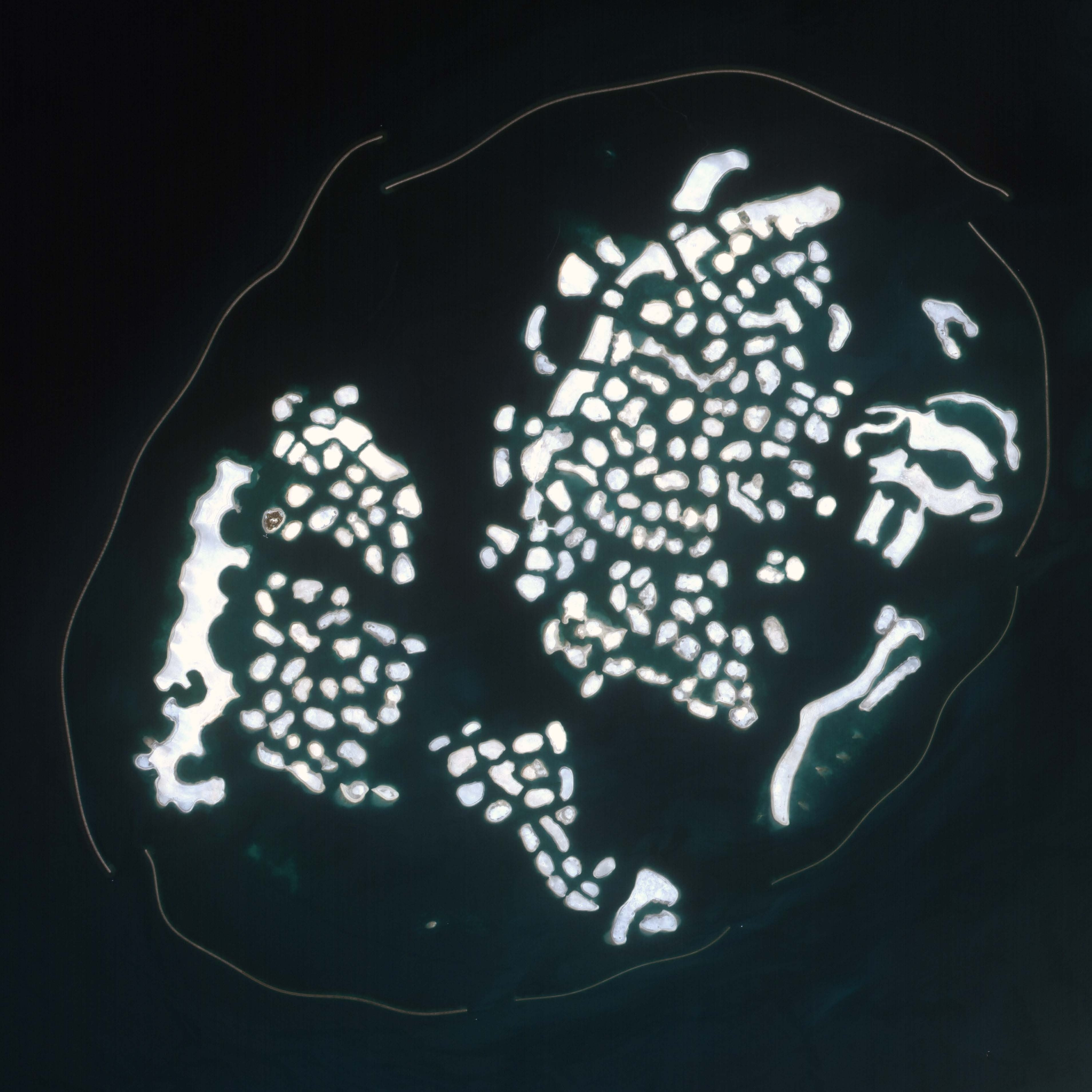
Satellite image of The World in Dubai by DubaiSat-1

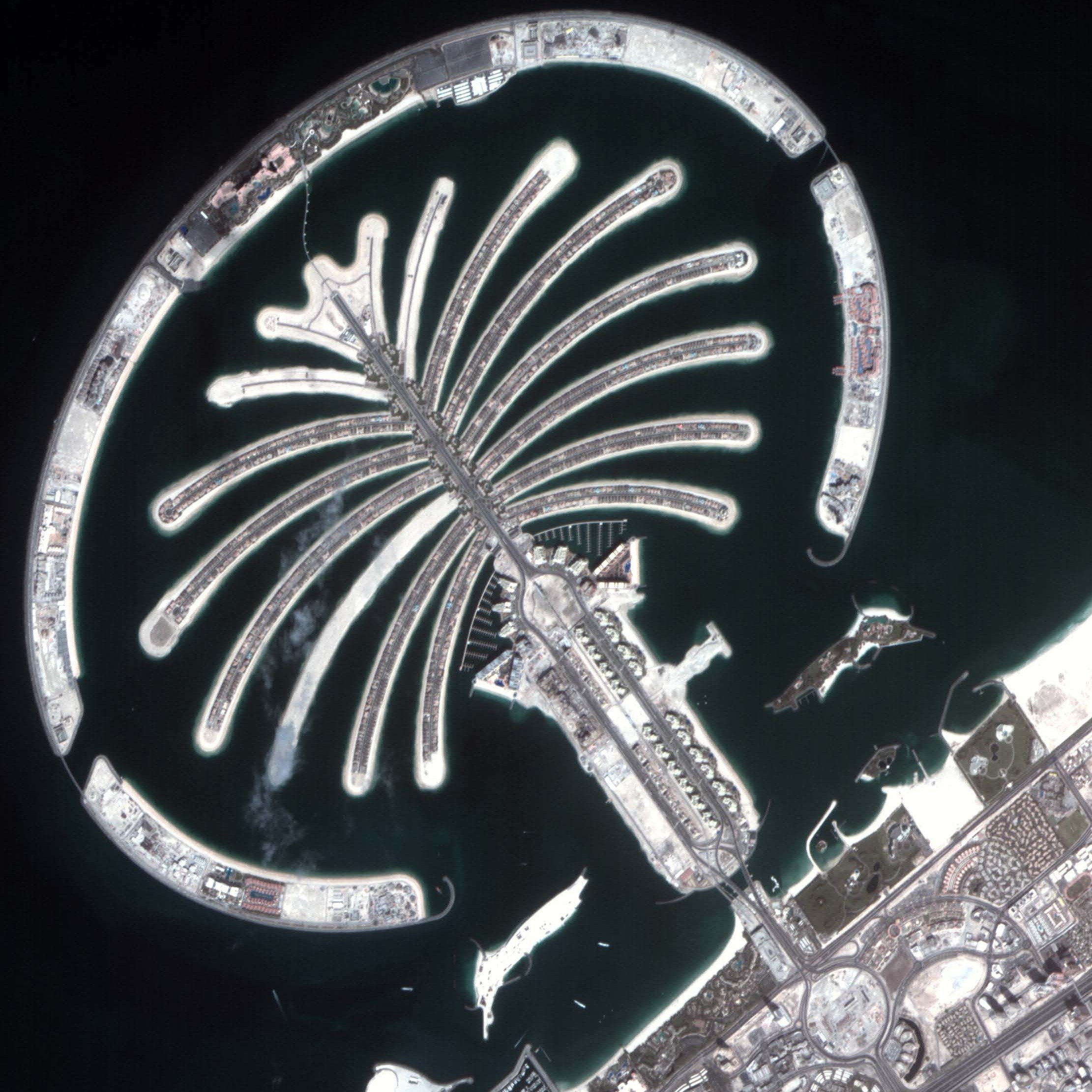
Satellite image of Palm Islands by DubaiSat-1

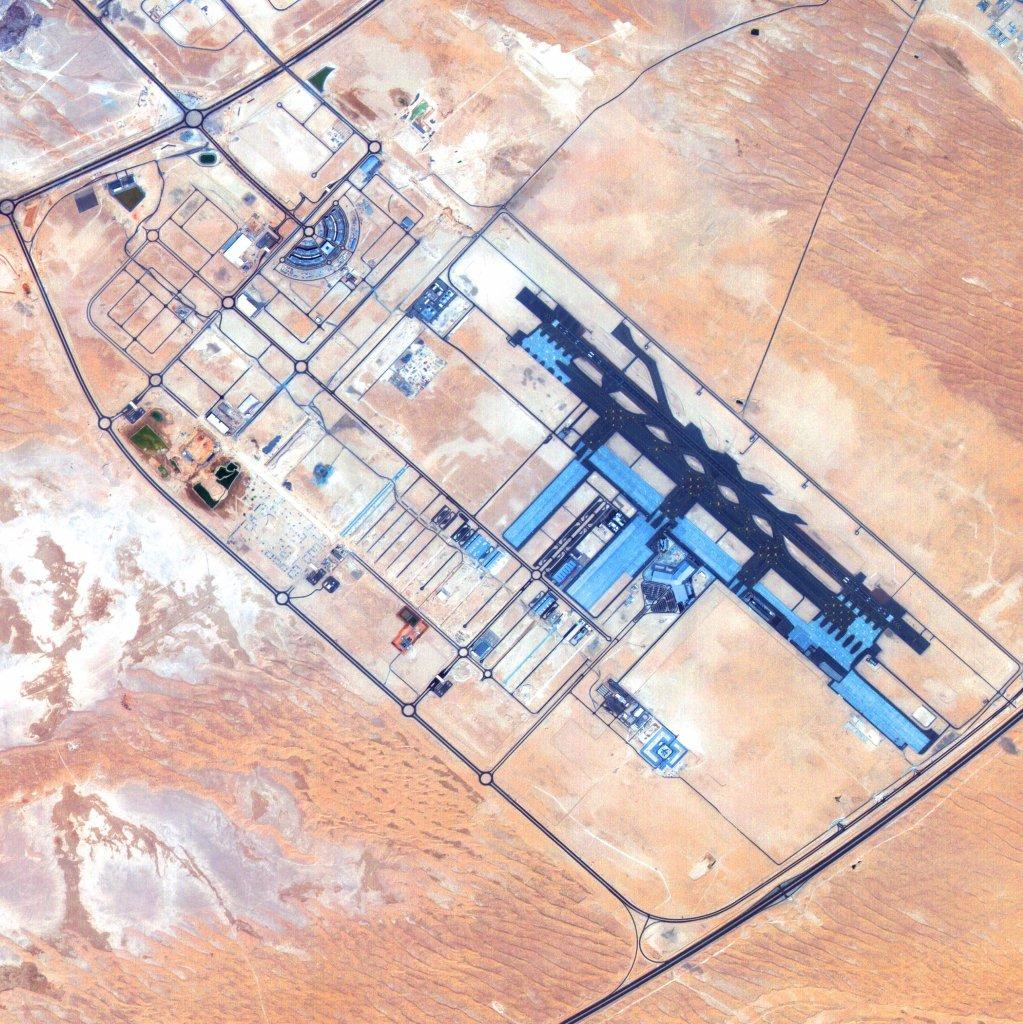
Satellite image of Al Maktoum International Airport by DubaiSat-1

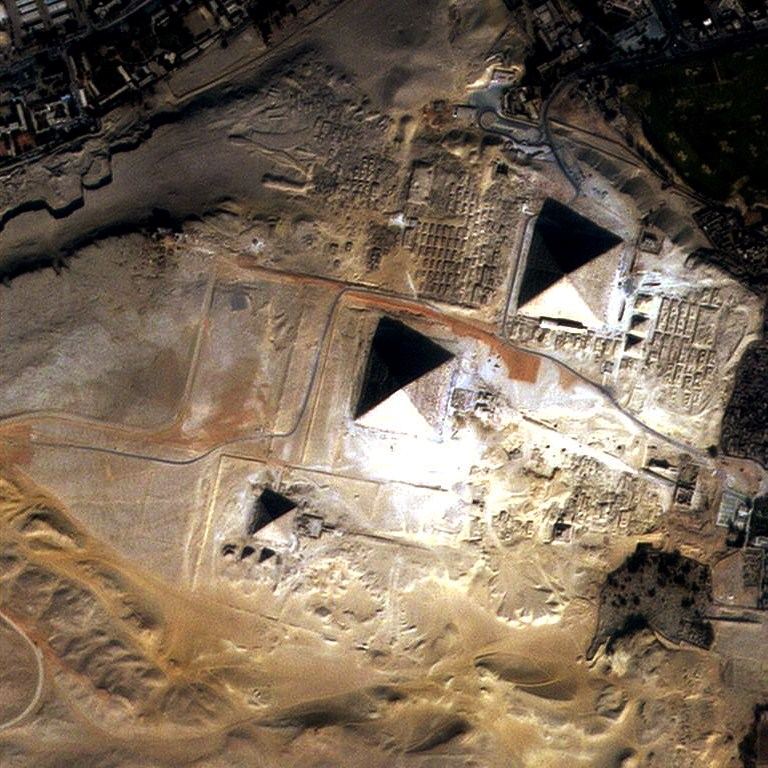
Satellite image of The Pyramids of Giza, Egypt by DubaiSat-1

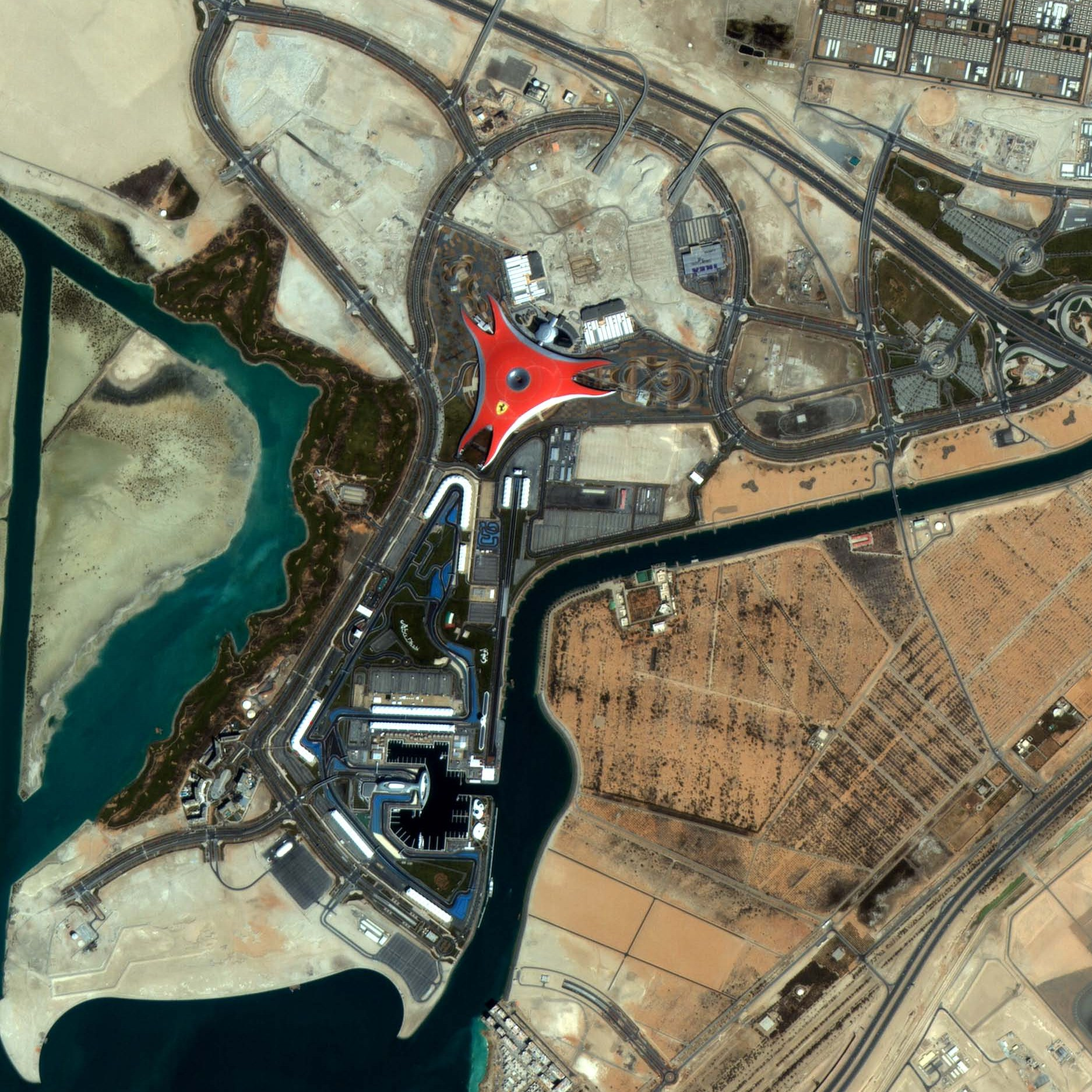
Satellite image of Ferrari World in Abu Dhabi by DubaiSat-1

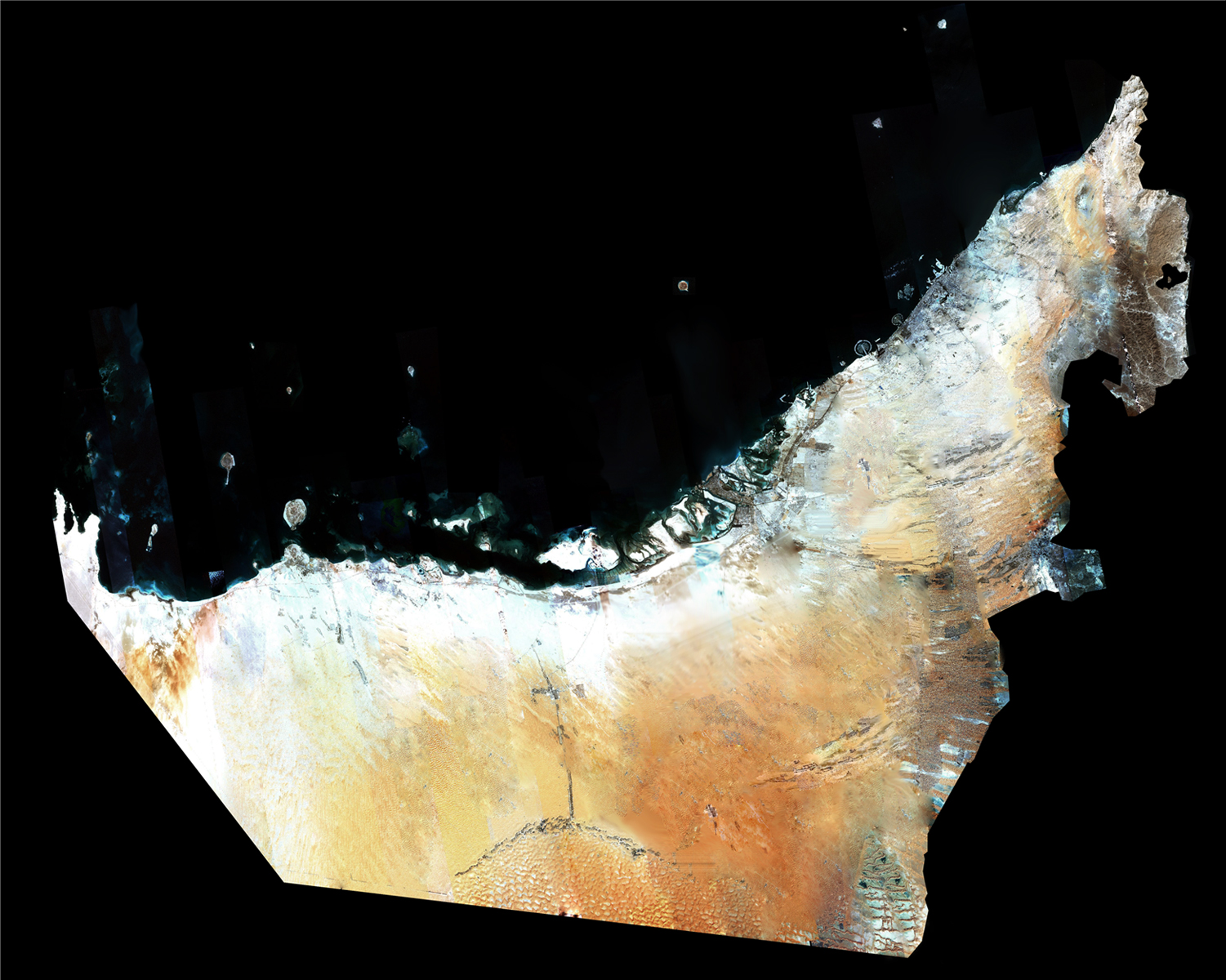
Satellite image of United Arab Emirates by DubaiSat-1
