= Al-Shayzari =

al-Shayzari may refer to:

- Abd al-Rahman ibn Nasr ibn Abdallah al-Shayzari (died 1193), Syrian Arabic writer on administration and love
- Abu'l-Ghana'im Muslim ibn Mahmud al-Shayzari (fl. 1201–1225), Syrian Arabic poet and astronomer
