= Abu'l-Ghana'im Muslim ibn Mahmud al-Shayzari =

Syrian-born Yemeni adīb and astronomer

Amīn al-Dīn Abu ʾl-Ghanāʾim Muslim ibn Maḥmūd al-Shayzarī (fl. 1201–1225) was a Syrian-born Yemeni adīb and astronomer.

Al-Shayzarī was born in Damascus into prominent family of mamālīk in the service of Usāma ibn Munqidh, lord of Shayzar in Syria. His father was still living in 1169. Al-Shayzarī later moved to the court of al-Muʿizz Ismāʿīl ibn Ṭughtigīn (r. 1197–1201), Ayyubid governor of Yemen. He dedicated to him an anthology of adab in twenty-five chapters, ʿAjāʾib al-ashʿār wa-gharāʾib al-akhbār, of which a single medieval manuscript is preserved, dated 1291 and now in Peshawar. In 1225, he composed another anthology in sixteen books, Jamharat al-Islām dhāt al-nathr wa ʾl-niẓām, for the Ayyubid governor al-Masʿūd Ṣalāḥ al-Dīn Yūsuf (r. 1215–1229). He included poems by himself and his son Aḥmad. The Jamharat is preserved in a single manuscript dated 1298 and now in Leiden. A second work dedicated to al-Masʿūd is the ʿĀdāt al-nujūm, known from a manuscript copied in 1665 or 1666 and now in Ṣanʿāʾ. It is an astronomical almanac similar to the Calendar of Córdoba. It was not compiled for use in Yemen.

Al-Shayzarī's date of death is unknown.

== Bibliography ==
- Ahmad, Mukhtar D. (1956). An Introduction to and Analysis of the Leiden MS. of Jamharat al-Islām by al-Shaizarī, with a Critical Edition of Some Hitherto Unpublished Passages (D.Phil. thesis). Oxford University.
- Brockelmann, Carl (2017). History of the Arabic Written Tradition. Translated by Joep Lameer. Brill.
- King, David A. (1983). Mathematical Astronomy in Medieval Yemen: A Biobibliographical Survey (PDF). Undena Publications.
- Sellheim, Rudolf (1997). "al-S̲h̲ayzarī". In Bosworth, C. E.; van Donzel, E.; Heinrichs, W. P. & Lecomte, G. (eds.). The Encyclopaedia of Islam, Second Edition. Volume IX: San–Sze. Leiden: E. J. Brill. p. 411. doi:10.1163/1573-3912_islam_SIM_6902. ISBN 978-90-04-10422-8.
- Sezgin, Fuat, ed. (1986). Jamharat al-islam dhāt al-nathr wa-l-nizām. Institut für Geschichte der Arabisch Islamischen Wissenschaften.
