= Farhadi =

Farhadi (Persian: فرهادی) is an Iranian surname. Notable people with this surname include:

- Adib Farhadi (born 1972), Afghan-American academician
- Ali Farhadi (born 1982), American computer scientist
- Asghar Farhadi (born 1972), Iranian film director and screenwriter
- Esmaeil Farhadi (born 1982), Iranian football player
- Mohammad Farhadi (born 1949), Iranian physician, politician and government minister
- Ravan A. G. Farhâdi (born 1929), Afghani diplomat who was Afghanistan's Ambassador to the United Nations from 1993 to 2006. Also a linguist, researcher and translator
- Sarina Farhadi (born 1998), Iranian actress
