= Adib =

- Pronunciation: Arabic: [ˈʔadiːb]
- Gender: Male
- Language: Arabic

Origin
- Meaning: Scholar, Cultured

Other names
- Alternative spelling: Adeeb, Adieb, Adibe

Adib (also spelled Adeeb) (Arabic:أديب) is a given name and a surname meaning enlighted writer or one who practises adab. Notable people having this name:

== Given name ==
=== Adeeb ===
- Adeeb (1934–2006), Pakistani film actor
- Adeeb Al-Haizan (born 2001), Saudi Arabian footballer
- Adeeb Khalid (born 1964), American professor

=== Adib ===
- Adib Alkhalidey (born 1987 or 1988), Canadian actor
- Adib Boroumand (1924–2017), Iranian poet
- Adib Fahim (born 1980s), Afghan politician
- Adib Farhadi (born 1972), Afghan professor
- Adib Ishaq (1856–1885), Syrian literary figure
- Adib Domingos Jatene (1929–2014), Brazilian physician
- Adib Khan, Australian novelist
- Adib Khansari (1901–1982), Iranian musician
- Adib Kheir, Syrian nationalist
- Adib Raop (born 1999), Malaysian footballer
- Adib Sabir (died 1143 AD), Persian poet
- Adib Shishakli (1909–1964), Syrian military leader
- Adib Taherzadeh (1921–2000), Iranian Bahá'í Faith scholar
- Adib Zainudin (born 1995), Malaysian footballer

=== Adíb ===
- Hájí Mírzá Ḥasan-i-Adíbu'l-`Ulamá (1848–1919), eminent follower of Bahá'u'lláh, the founder of the Bahá'í Faith

== Surname ==
=== Adeeb ===
- Ali al-Adeeb (born 1944), Iraqi politician
- Mirza Adeeb (1914–1999), Pakistani playwright

=== Adib ===
- Auguste Adib Pacha (1859–1936), Lebanese politician, writer and the first Prime Minister of Lebanon
- Mustapha Adib (activist) (born 1968), Moroccan human rights activist and ex-captain in the Royal Moroccan Air Force
- Mustapha Adib (politician) (born 1972), Lebanese diplomat, lawyer, educator, politician, researcher, academic and incumbent Prime Minister-designate of Lebanon

== See also ==
- Al Adib, Lebanese literary magazine published between 1942 and 1983
- SS Adib, coastal tanker
- Thuban, star in the constellation Draco sometimes known as Adib
- Abu Dhabi Islamic Bank
