= David Semah =

Israeli scholar of Arabic literature (1932–1997)

- דוד צמח
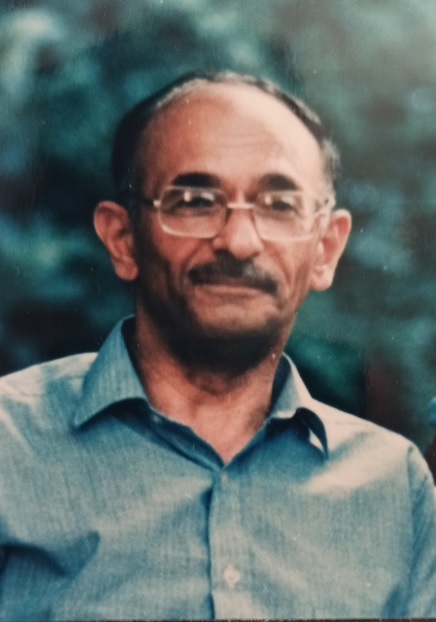
- Born: September 4, 1932; Baghdad, Iraq
- Died: April 29, 1997 (aged 64); Haifa, Israel

Academic background
- Education: Oxford University; Hebrew University

Academic work
- Main interests: Research and Teaching of Arabic Language and Literature

David Semah (Hebrew: דוד צמח; September 4, 1932 – April 29, 1997) was an Israeli scholar of Arabic literature. He was a professor at the Department of Arabic Language and Literature at the University of Haifa. As one of the founders, he remained closely involved in the Department's activities from its establishment in the mid-1960s and until his death.

== Biography ==
David Semah was born in Baghdad into a secular Jewish family. His father was a senior official in the State Comptroller's Office of the Iraqi government. He initially attended the "Alliance" School. In 1950, upon graduating from the "Shamash" Jewish High School, he immigrated to Israel, secretly crossing the border into Iran where he stayed for several weeks. His family joined him a few months later as part of Operation Ezra and Nehemiah. As a teenager, he wrote prose and poetry and published some of his works in the local press. He was particularly versed in the theory of metrics and Classical Arabic.

Semah continued to write poems in Arabic in his early days in Israel, some of which were recited on the radio and published in the local Arabic and Hebrew press after translation. He was among the first Jewish writers to publish works in Arabic and was labeled by some as one of the most prolific writers of Arabic poetry in Israel’s early years. He also published articles on Arab culture and literature. In 1954 in Tel Aviv, together with fellow literary enthusiasts and some childhood friends including Professor Sasson Somekh, Professor Shimon Ballas and author Sami Michael, he founded the Arab Literary Club, later named the "Jewish-Arab Literary Club". One of the club’s stated goals was to promote understanding between the two peoples and encourage translations and dialogue between writers working in the two languages. In 1959 he published his book "Hatta Yaji al Rabīʿah" ("Until Spring Comes"), featuring a selection of poems, most of which he wrote in his youth. The book generated much excitement and made a big impact on the Arabic cultural community in Israel.

In the years 1960–1965, while working as a translator at the Ministry of Justice, Semah turned to academic studies at the Hebrew University of Jerusalem. There he completed a bachelor's degree in Arabic Language and Literature and Middle Eastern history, and a master's degree in 1965 under the guidance of Professor Kister. His thesis focused on the works of Abu Ali al-Muḥassin Al-Tanukhi, “Al-Faraj baʿd al-shiddah” (Deliverance Follows Adversity), and was later presented to the public at the National Library in Jerusalem. In 1966, after taking part in the Concordance Project for Arabic Poetry and working as an Arabic teacher, he was sent on behalf of the Haifa Academic Institute (later named the University of Haifa) to Oxford University in England to pursue his doctoral studies. After graduation, he was intended to help establish the Department of Arabic Language and Literature in Haifa and become a faculty member. He wrote his doctoral dissertation, Four Egyptian Literary Critics, under the auspices of Egyptian scholar Professor Mustafa Badawi on the teachings of four Egyptian literary critics: al-Aqqad, Hussein Heikal, Taha Hussein, Muhammad Mandur. This work was widely acclaimed and published in 1974 by Brill Publishers in the Netherlands (Leiden) as a textbook on modern Egyptian literature, serving as the basis for research papers on Arabic literary critique.

Upon his return to Israel in 1969, he joined the department's faculty and held several academic and administrative positions in the department, the university, and other research and academic institutions in Israel. In the early 1970s, he was appointed Head of the Department and also lectured at the Hebrew University of Jerusalem, Tel Aviv University, Bar-Ilan University and the Yezreel Valley College. He served as the teachers’ representative at the University of Haifa’s Board of Governors, was a member of the Committee of Instruction of the Faculty of Humanities, member of the University Senate and member of the Graduate Studies Council. In 1975–1977, he served as the academic director of Tel-Hai College and took park in the founding of its Department of Arabic Language and Literature. In 1984 he was appointed full professor and in 1986–1990 he was a member of the Council of the Israeli Academic Center in Cairo. He served on the editorial board of the journals, Asian and African Studies, and Al-Karmil. Semah died in Haifa on April 29, 1997, leaving behind his wife and three children.

=== Al-Karmil ===
In 1980, together with Prof. George J. Kanazi he co-founded the Al-Karmil scientific journal, which was published by the University of Haifa. He served as the editor-in-chief since its founding and until 1989, and continued to serve on the editorial board until his death. This journal, where Semah published articles and reviews, was devoted entirely to studies in the field of Arabic language and literature (classical and modern alike) and was the first in the Western world to publish articles in Arabic. This journal also set a precedent by separating the study of the Arabic language from other topics related to Oriental studies such as history, sociology, and anthropology. This separation was necessary in light of the changes that occurred in universities in Israel, with special departments of Arabic language and literature established separately from the departments of Middle Eastern studies. This journal, which gained prominence among the family of scientific journals in Israel and around the world, publishes articles by some of the best researchers in the field.

== Academic career ==
The research topics he studied and the subjects he taught spanned over many fields. He engaged with both modern and classical literature, specialized in past and present literary criticism, studied modern Egyptian literature, and focused on the works of Egyptian writers Tawfiq al-Hakim (the great Arab playwright of his time [1900–1987] whom he met in Cairo after the signing of the peace treaty with Egypt), Taha Hussein, Ahmad Amin, and the poet Al-Mutanabbi. He taught Sufi and Jahili poetry, studied the meters of classical poetry, the relationship between the meters of Arabic and Hebrew poetry in Spain and the meters of Bedouin poetry. Semah often focused on literature and poems revolving the theme of love, and over the years he also explored medieval Arabic culture and literature, the prosody of Classical Arabic poetry from which medieval Hebrew poetry branched, and classical Arab Muwashshah poetry. He also specialized in deciphering texts from ancient manuscripts. In 1993 he wrote the entry "Arabic Prosody" in the Princeton Encyclopedia of Poetry and Poetics, and in 1995 he published his book Karmilliyat – Studies on Forms and Metrics in Arabic Poetry, which mainly discusses problems of style, structure and metrics in Arabic poetry, both written in classical language and the kind used in popular dialects.

=== Rawdat al-qulub (The Garden of Hearts), by Abd al-Rahman Ibn Nasr al-Shayzari of the 12th century – by David Semah and George Kanazi, 2003 ===
This book on the subject of love which David Semah began writing was based on the works of al-Shayzari and completed and published after his death by Prof. George Kanazi in 2003. It’s based on a manuscript by 12th century scholar 'Abd al-Rahman al-Shayzari: author, poet and physician from the Syrian city of Shaizar, who was also a qadi and served as a judge in the city of Tiberias. Other than that, very little is known about his life story. The book includes poems, anecdotes about lovers and commentary by al-Shayzari himself, presenting the theme of love as reflected in the culture, literature, and Arabic poetry of that era. The 11-chapter book contains descriptions and explanations of the different types of love, their various levels of manifestation and homosexual love. According to al-Shayzari, love is a disease that can be cured in most cases, and as was customary at the time, the theoretical discussions in the book are written in rhyme. In addition to this book, Abd al-Rahman al-Shayzari wrote six other books on love (listed and reviewed in the book's foreword) that David Semah tried to trace in order to gather further information that would complete the picture in terms of al-Shayzari’s biography and works. Writing the book required restoring and deciphering various copies of al-Shayzari’s manuscript, the main ones found at the Bodleian Library at the University of Oxford and another copy at the Majlis Library in Tehran. David Semah got his hands on these two complementary manuscripts back in the 1970s. After completing as many missing or illegible passages of text as possible, and defining the rhythms of the poems, he published several articles on the subject, including:

Rawdat al-Qulub by al-Shayzari: A Twelfth Century Book on Love", Arabica Vol. XXIV/2 (1977): 58–68

And a Muslim-Christian dialogue on love-themed literature:

Between ʿAbd Allah and ʿAbd al-Masih, al-Karmil – Studies in Arabic Language and Literature, Vol. XVI, Haifa (1995): 55–65 (Arabic)

Prof. George Kanazi from the Department of Arabic Language and Literature (University of Haifa) took on completing the writing of Semah's unfinished book. Using additional copies of the manuscript, which he located in academic institutions in Germany and France, he continued the restoration and deciphering process, completed the book's writing, and finally published it. It's important to note that the complete original copy of the manuscript has not yet been found. In the introduction to the book, Prof. Kanazi expresses his hope that this copy will be found in the future and help solve questions that remain unanswered.

=== Unfinished book in Hebrew ===
In his final years, Semah labored on writing the book Love in the Arabic Cultural Tradition, which he never completed. The book, which he began writing in Hebrew, appeals both to the general reader who is curious about our Arab neighbors' literary work and to students majoring in Arabic language and literature. In addition to an ongoing overview of the central motifs of Arabic love-themed literature, the book also includes chapters based on studies that David Semah conducted and published in the past, as well as ideas and conclusions drawn by other scholars and studies that he did not have time to publish, such as the book Rawdat Al-Qulub (The Garden of Hearts) which was completed after his death by Prof. George J. Kanazi from the University Haifa. The book includes poems translated by the author and other texts translated by Prof. Shimon Ballas, Prof. Joseph Sadan, Prof. Reuven Snir and Dr. Ella Almagor ("The Ring of the Dove"). In the sixth and final chapter "Arab Love Tales and World Culture – A Possible Influence?", Semah began to discuss the following topics:

1. Ibn Sina and Abraham Ezra ("Hai ben Mekitz")
2. Arabic Love Literature and the Troubadour Poetry
3. Ibn Hazm and Andreas Capellanus (“The Ring of the Dove”)
4. Ibn Sina and Judah Abarbanel ("Epistle on Love")
5. Ibn Tufail and Daniel Defoe ("Hai ben Mekitz" and "Robinson Crusoe")

== Published works ==
=== Books ===
- "Until spring comes", (Poetry), The Modern press, Tel-Aviv 1959
- Studies on the Literary Works of Tawfīq al-Ḥakīm, al-Sharq Publication, Jerusalem, 110 pp. 1970
- Studies in Arabic language and literature, al-Sharq Publication, Jerusalem, 237 pp. 1971
- Four Egyptian Literary Critics, Supplements to the Journal of Arabic Literature, III, E.J. Brill, Leiden 1974
- Lights on the Literary Works of Tawfīq al-Ḥakīm, al-Sharq Publication, Jerusalem, 103 pp. 1979
- Karmilliyat – Studies on Forms and Metrics in Arabic Poetry. Department of Arabic Language and Literature, University of Haifa, 247 pp. 1995
- Rawdat al-qulub wa nuzhat al-muhibb wa al-mahbub (The garden of hearts and the recreation of the lover and beloved) by Abd al-Rahman Ibn Nasr al-Shayzari (12th century), Completed and brought to press by George J. kanazi. 2003, Harrassowitz Verlag Wiesbaden

=== Articles ===
- "Muhammad Mandur and the New Poetry", Journal of Arabic Literature, Vol. II, (1971): 143–153
- "Ibn Ammar and his Lost Book al-Mubayyida", al-Sharq, Vol .I, (1971): 18–20, (Arabic)
- "A study of Bank al-Qalaq by Tawfiq al-Hakim", al-Sharq, Vol. III, (1972): 37–44 (Arabic)
- "Manazil al-Ahbab wa Manazih al-Albab by Shihab al-Din Mahmud al-Halabi",(Homes of the Beloved and Gardens of the Heart) al-Sharq, Vol. V, (1974): 65–78 (Arabic)
- "Love Disease: Its Symptoms, Results, and Treatment", Chapters from Arabic Love Literature, al-Sharq, Vol .V, (1975): 27–36, (Arabic)
- "On the Metres of al-Khalil’s First and Fourth Circles", Journal of Semitic Studies Vol. XXII/ 1 (1977): 58–68
- "Rawdat al-Qulub by al-Shayzari: A Twelfth Century Book on Love”, Arabica Vol. XXIV/2 (1977): 58–68.
- "Ahmad Amin and Western Civilization", Arabic and Islamic Studies, II, Bar-Ilan University Press, 1978, pp. 93–101 (Hebrew)
- "Tawfiq al-Hakim and the Search for Lost Dimensions", "Bama" drama quarterly, 1978, 77–78, 1978, pp. 3–8, (Hebrew)
- "Perpetuity and Impossibility: on Modes of Expression in Ancient Arabic Poetry". al-karmil – Studies in Arabic Language and Literature, Vol. I, Haifa (1980): 83–107 (Arabic)
- "Notes on Abu al-Jaysh al-Andalusi’s ’Epistle on Arabic Metrics" al-karmil – Studies in Arabic Language and Literature, Vol. II, Haifa (1981): 81–116 (Arabic)
- "Ôamdæn al-Læôiqî's 'Urjûza on Love – Is it the Earliest Link in Arabic Love" al-karmil – Studies in Arabic Language and Literature, Vol. III, Haifa (1982): 61–82 (Arabic)
- "The Rhythmical Function of the Watid and Fasila", Journal of Semitic Studies Vol. XXVIII/2 (1983): 321–335
- "Quantity and Syllabic Parity in Hispano-Arabic Muwashshah", Arabica Vol. XXXI/1 (1983): 80–107
- "Two Hebrew Strophic Poems with the Same Arabic Kharja", Tarbiz, LII / LV (1983), pp. 611–621 (Hebrew)
- "The Muwashshaôæt in 'Uqûd al-La'æl by al-Nawæjî" al-karmil – Studies in Arabic Language and Literature, Vol. IV, Haifa (1983): 67–92 (Arabic)
- "Notes on the Structure of the Andalusian Muwashshaô" al-karmil – Studies in Arabic Language and Literature, Vol. VI, Haifa (1985): 147–164 (Arabic)
- “The Poetics of Humayni Poetry in Yemen”, Jerusalem Studies in Arabic and Islam Vol. XI, (1988): 220–239.
- "A Voyage through the Basîà Metre" al-karmil – Studies in Arabic Language and Literature, Vol. IX, Haifa (1988): 49–73 (Arabic)
- "On the Formal Origins of the Jewish Yemenite muwaššaḥ", Tarbiz, (a scientific quarterly of contemporary Jewish studies) Vol. LVIII / II, 1989, pp. 239–260 (Hebrew)
- "Mîr Baòrî and the Resurgence of Modern Iraqi Literature" al-karmil – Studies in Arabic Language and Literature, Vol. X, Haifa (1989): 83–122 (Arabic)
- "Tawfiq al-Hakim and Western Culture”, Bulletin of the Israeli Academic Center in Cairo 12 (July 1989): 49–51.
- "Rukbani and Nazm al-Banat”, Studies in Canonical and Popular Arabic Literature, eds.: S. Ballas and R. Snir, (Toronto 1989): 55–68.
- "The Prosody of Non-Classical Poetry" al-karmil – Studies in Arabic Language and Literature, Vol. XI, Haifa (1990): 93–127 (Arabic)
- "lip service to the idea of recruited literature", on Food for Every Mouth, "Bama" drama quarterly, Vol 25, 1991, pp. 85–87 (Hebrew)
- "On the Meter of Bedouin Poetry", Asian and African Studies Vol. XXV/2 (July 1991): 187–200.
- "Ibn Zaydûn – Did He Really Wish to Die for a Lasting Union with his Beloved"?, al-karmil – Studies in Arabic Language and Literature, Vol. XII, Haifa (1991): 147–152 (Arabic)
- "Colloquial Lebanese and Palestinian Poetry and the Problem of Metre", al-karmil – Studies in Arabic Language and Literature, Vol. XIII, Haifa (1992): 95–143 (Arabic)
- "The Concept of Courtly Love: A Comparison Between Ibn Hazm and Andreas Capellanus", Circa 1492: Proceedings of the Jerusalem Colloquium: Littera Judaeorum in Terra Hispanica, ed.: Isaac Benabu, (The Hebrew University of Jerusalem, 1992): 166–174.
- "CVC, Dunash b. Labrat and Arabic Metrics", in proceedings of the 33rd International Congress of Asian and North African studies, Edwin Mellen Press, Ontario 1993
- "Urūḍ [2] al-Waraqa lil-Jawhar" al-karmil – Studies in Arabic Language and Literature, Vol. XV, Haifa (1994): 105–131 (Arabic)
- "Modern Zajal and the Quest for Freedom", Journal of Arabic Literature 26 (1995): 80–92
- "Between ʿAbd Allah and ʿAbd al-Masih" al-karmil – Studies in Arabic Language and Literature, Vol. XVI, Haifa (1995): 55–65 (Arabic)
- "On the Metre of Kaṛam il-Yatīm", Journal of Arabic Literature Vol. 26, No. 3 (Oct., 1995), pp. 255–257
- "Pegs and Cords in the Meters of Hebrew Poetry in Spain", Criticism and Interpretation, Journal for Interdisciplinary Studies in Literature and Culture Vol. 32, 1998, pp. 111–123 (Hebrew)

=== Chapters in books ===
- "Tawfiq al-Hakim and the Legend of the Ivory Tower", in studies on the Literary Works of Tawfiq al-Hakim, Jerusalem (1970): 95–108 (Arabic)
- "Ṭāhā Ḥusayn's Drive towards Artistic Criticism", Arabic and Islamic studies, Vol. I, Bar-Ilan University Press, 1973, pp. 123–140 (Hebrew)
- "Poetry and its Audience According to Medieval Arab Poeticians", Israel Oriental Studies: Studies in Medieval Arabic and Hebrew Poetics, ed.: Sasson Somekh, (Leiden: E.J. Brill, 1991) XI: 91–107.

=== Scientific reviews ===
- "The Changing Rhythm", Leiden 1973, by Sasson Somekh, "Hamizrah Hehadash" (The New East]), Vol. XXIV, 1974 pp. 240–243 (Hebrew)
- "Form and Structure in the Poetry of al-Mutamid b.Abbad", Leiden 1974, by Raymond Scheindlin, Hamizrah Hehadash (The New East), Vol. XXV. 3, 1975, pp. 256–258 (Hebrew)
- "A new approach in the study of Arabic Literature" On the Art of Medieval Arabic Literature", Princeton 1974, by Andreas Hamori, (A new approach in the study of Arabic Literature), Hamizrah Hehadash (The New East), Vol. XXVII. 1978, pp. 361–362 (Hebrew)
- "The Poetics of Classical Arabic Rhyme", Tel Aviv 1980, by Rina Drori, al-karmil – Studies in Arabic Language and Literature, Vol.II, Haifa (1981): 160–163 (Arabic)
- "On As'ad Khairallah's Love, Madness and Poetry" – An Interpretation of the Maínûn Legend (Beirut 1980)125–128 al-karmil – Studies in Arabic Language and Literature, Vol. III, Haifa (1982): 125–128 (Arabic)
- "The Language of Fiction in the Works of Yusuf Idris", Tel Aviv 1984, by Sasson Somekh – al-karmil – Studies in Arabic Language and Literature, Vol. V, Haifa (1984): 99–104 (Arabic).
- "The Hebrew Girdle Poem (Muwashshah) in the Middle Ages (in Hebrew)", David Semah Tova Rosen-Moked,, Haifa University Press 1985 al-karmil – Studies in Arabic Language and Literature, Vol. VII, Haifa (1986): 203–209 (Arabic)
- "Arûê al-Khalîl, by Aômad Sulaymæn Yæqût Alexandria", 1989 [1] al-karmil – Studies in Arabic Language and Literature, Vol. XI, Haifa (1990): 229–233 (Arabic)
- "The Arab Poetry of the Jews of Iraq – Review and Study", the Society of Hebrew Literature, Bar-Ilan university, April 1991, (the 8th conference)
- "A Study on Egyptian Vernacular Poetry by Kamæl 'Abdel-Malek" 1990 [1] al-karmil – Studies in Arabic Language and Literature, Vol. XI, Haifa (1991): 153–161 (Arabic)
- "Habib al-Husayni. Diråsat ʾAwzån al-Muwashsha•åt al-ʿArabiyya". Beirut: 1991 [1] al-karmil – Studies in Arabic Language and Literature, Vol. XIV, Haifa (1993): 171–176 (Arabic)
- "Five Ragaz Collections": Materials for the Study of Ragaz Poetry II, Studia Orientalia, Helsinki, 1995. Finish Oriental Society. Hamizrah Hehadash (The New East), Vol. 38. 1996, pp. 218–219 (Hebrew)
- "Arabic Prosody and its Application in Muslim Poetry". Uppsala, Swedish Research Institute of Istanbul, 1994. Hamizrah Hehadash (The New East), Vol. 38. 1996, pp. 219–221 (Hebrew)

=== Encyclopaedia entries ===
- "Al-Mutanabbī", Encyclopedia Hebraica, XXIV, 1972, p. 772 (Hebrew)
- "Zajal", "al-Khuli Amin", "al-Husayni Ishaq Musa" and "Hilal Muhammad Ghunaymi", Entries in Encyclopedia of Arabic Literature, eds.: Meisami and P. Starkey, (London and New York).
- "Al-Hakim, Tawfiq", Encyclopedia of World Literature in the 20th Century, (New York 1982), II: 316–318.
- "Husayn, Taha", Encyclopedia of World Literature in the 20th Century, (New York 1982), II: 416–418
- "Arabic Prosody", The New Princeton Encyclopedia of Poetry and Poetics, ed.: A. Preminger and T. Brogan, (Princeton University Press, New Jersey 1993): 91–94.

=== Dictionaries ===
- Participation in the preparation of The Oxford English-Arabic Dictionary of Current Usage, ed. by N. S. Doniach, Oxford, Clarendon Press 1972.

=== Links and press releases ===
- David Semah, Department of Arabic Language and Literature, University of Haifa
- "Obituary for professor David Semah", by Mustafa Badawi, ST Antony's Collage, 133–134, 2000
- "I am Iraq", by David Semah, “Kol HaAm”(“Voice of the people”) Friday, August 30, 1957 (Hebrew)
- The Arabic Language and the Israeli Culture – in the wake of Dr. Yisrael Ben-Zeev’s lecture, by David Semah, “Kol HaAm”(“Voice of the people”) Friday, January 24, 1958 (Hebrew)
- "The Arab Peoples with Open Eyes", by David Semah, “Kol HaAm” Friday, September 12, 1958 (Hebrew)
- "The Poet’s Distinguished Role", by David Semah, “Kol HaAm”, Friday, October 10, 1958 (Hebrew)
- "Songs in which the People Cheer", by David Semah, “Kol HaAm”, Friday, October 31, 1958 (Hebrew)
- "The Poet from Baghdad", Nazik al-Malaika, by David Semah, “Kol HaAm”, Friday, January 2, 1959 (Hebrew)
- "Until Spring Comes by David Semah", by Adiv Kas, “Kol HaAm”, Friday, April 24, 1959 (Hebrew)
- "Two Poems by David Semah", Hebrew – Haya Kadmon, “Kol HaAm”, Friday, April 24, 1959 (Hebrew)
- "Arab Contribution to World Culture", by David Semah, “Kol HaAm”, Friday, March 25, 1960 (Hebrew)
- "Bialik in Arabic Garb", by Zvi Lavi, "Maariv", Friday, August 19, 1966 (Hebrew)
- "Rainbow to the Arab Culture", David Semah, “LaMerhav”, (Hebrew daily), Friday, August 7, 1970 (Hebrew)
- "History of the Arabic Literature", David Semah, “LaMerhav”, (Hebrew daily), Friday, October 23, 1970 (Hebrew)
- "Four Egyptian Literary Critics", By Shimon Ballas – On the Book of David Semah, "HaAretz", November 29, 1974 (Hebrew)
- "What Distinguishes Man from Animals", On the Dramatic Work of Tawfiq al-Hakim, David Semah, Iton 77, (Israeli monthly literary and culture magazine), 2nd year, 7th edition, January–March 1978 (Hebrew)
- "More on Justice and Democracy", Prof. David Semah, "Maariv", November 11, 1979 (Hebrew)
- "Israeli-Egyptian Literary Encounter", "Davar", March 15, 1982, (Hebrew)
- "The Song Of Songs in Arabic Translation", Meeting with three of the greatest Egyptian writers, "Maariv", March 19, 1982 (Hebrew)
- "Nissim Rejwan's: The Jews Of Iraq", David Semah, "New Outlook", Sept'-Oct, 1986
- "Mikhail Murad the Poet", Prof. David Semah, Babylonian Jewry, "Nehardea", April, 1988 (Hebrew)
- "TV Documentary on the Jews of Iraq", David Semah, "Maariv", January 26, 1989 (Hebrew)
- "The 'Iraqi' Novel of Samir Naqash", prof David Semah, Journal of the Babylonian Jewry, "Nehardea", April 4, 1990
- "Between Jews and Arabs", Reflections on Jewish-Gentile Relations in Iraq”, Prof. David Semah, Journal of the Babylonian Jewry, "Nehardea", October, 1993 (Hebrew)
- "Purely Serious and Professional", Prof. David Semah, Music and Singing in Contemporary Egypt. Haaretz, Culture and Literature Section, March 3, 1996
