= Mishal Hamed Kanoo =

Emirati businessman

- مشعل حمد كانو
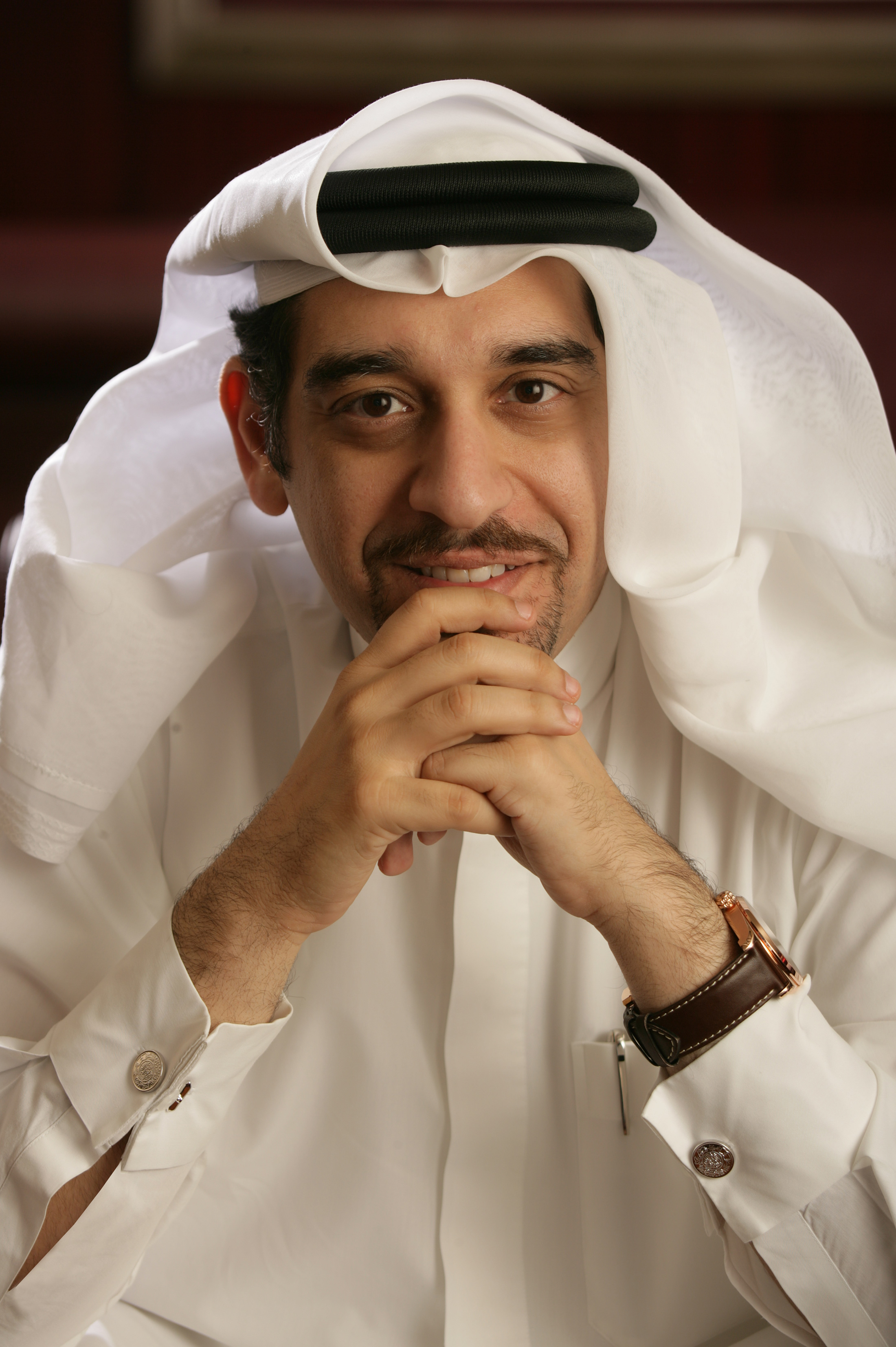
- Born: February 25, 1969 (age 57); United Arab Emirates
- Education: University of St. Thomas; Houston, Texas; Bachelor of Arts in Economics & Business Administration; MBA (Finance); American University of Sharjah; Sharjah, UAE; EMBA (General)
- Occupation: Chairman of The Kanoo Group
- Website: www.mishalkanoo.com kanoogroup.com

Mishal Hamed Kanoo (Arabic: مشعل حمد كانو, born February 25, 1969) is an Emirati businessman, He is the chairman of The Kanoo Group, a conglomerate based in the UAE and Oman. The company has appeared in various lists, such as the Top 100 Powerful Arabs 2017, the Power 100, and the Rich List 2009.

In 2015, he assumed the Chairmanship of The Kanoo Group following the passing of Yusuf Ahmed Kanoo in 2014. The Kanoo Group operates across diverse sectors including shipping, travel, machinery, logistics, property, energy, chemicals, training, retail, and various joint ventures.

== Early life and education ==
Born in Dubai and educated through high school locally, Kanoo continued his college studies in the United States. He took Comparative Theology and Philosophy and double major in Economics as his first degree and later earned his MBA in Finance from the University of St. Thomas in Houston.

Kanoo left the business for a time and later earned his second MBA at the American University of Sharjah, where he subsequently became a visiting lecturer on a course in Family Business.

He worked at Arthur Andersen in Dubai as an auditor before returning to The Kanoo Group as Deputy Chairman in 1997. At that time, his uncle, Mubarak Kanoo, was the chairman of the holding company. He served as the Deputy Chairman until the time he took up his most recent role.

== Career ==
Kanoo is a frequent speaker at conferences in the Middle East, and around the world at events where an independent Middle East view is required. Some of his speaking engagements include the World Summit on Innovation and Entrepreneurship in Dubai, and The International Herald Tribunes CEO Roundtable in Malaysia.

As visiting lecturer at the American University of Sharjah School of Business Administration, he is an advocate of education and believes that it allows people to take responsibility and control of their lives.

He was a columnist for MONEYworks, Arabian Business, Gulf Business and 7days, and regularly writes articles for local and regional media about social and business affairs in the Gulf and global capital markets.

== Interests ==
=== Meem Gallery ===
Kanoo is involved in the progress of Dubai's art scene. As an eccentric collector, a pride of place in his office goes to a painting of Cuban revolutionary Che Guevara by the Bahraini artist Jamal Abdul Raheem. He supported the creation of one of Middle East's fastest-growing art districts in Dubai, the Meem Gallery in 2007. He launched the Meem Gallery together with Sultan Sooud Al-Qassemi, a member of Sharjah's royal family and founder of Barjeel Art Foundation and British curator, Charles Pocock.

Meem Gallery's expertise lies in modern and contemporary Arab and Iranian art. In addition to exhibiting important modern and contemporary works, the Meem Gallery encourages a greater understanding of Middle Eastern art through its publications available at Noor Library. The Noor Library of Middle Eastern Art, held at Meem Gallery, is one of the largest international resource centres for the arts of the Middle East.
