= Fadel Al Mheiri =

Emirati filmmaker

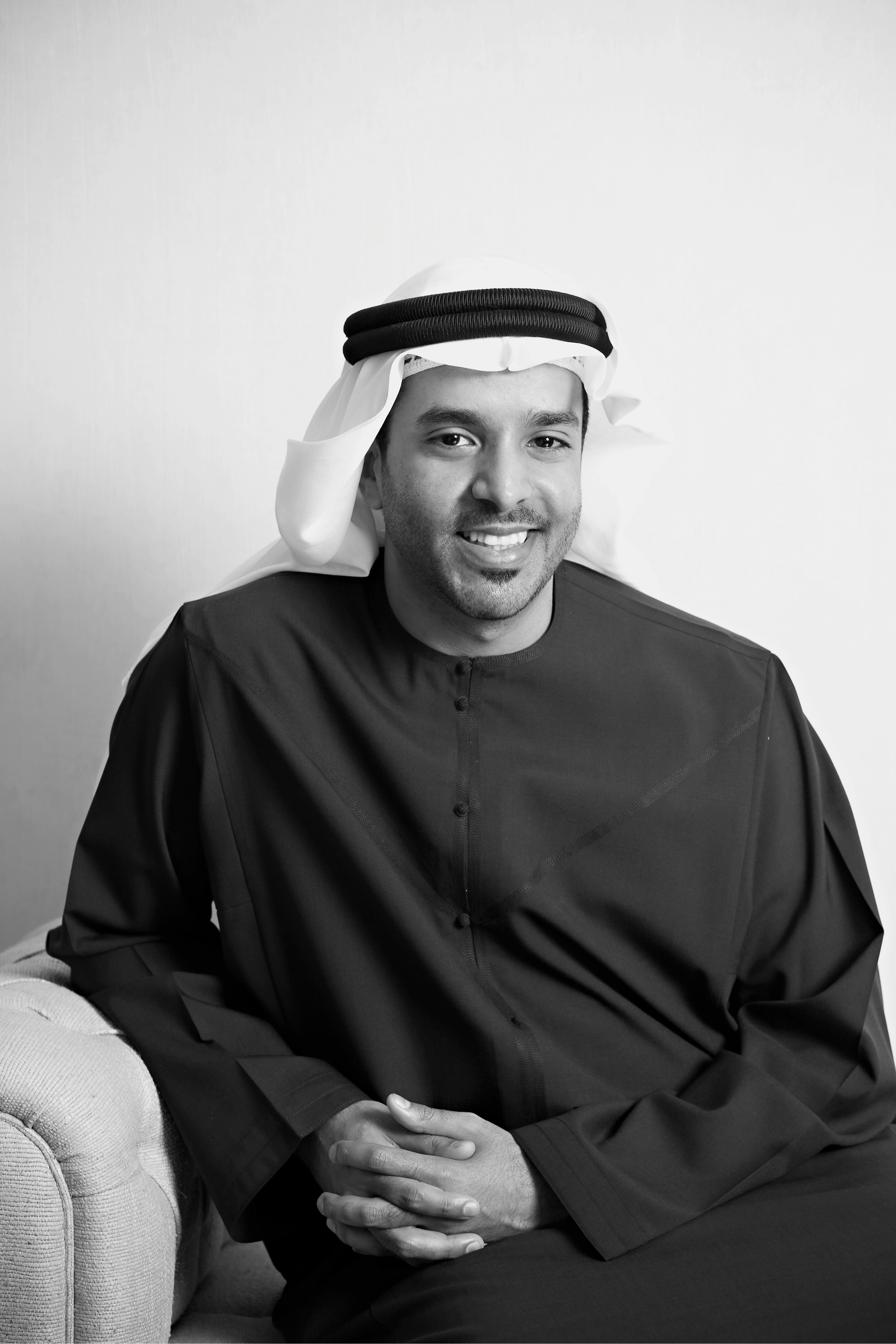
- Other name: Fadel Al Muhairi
- Education: American University of Sharjah
- Occupation: Filmmaker

Fadel Al Mheiri is an Emirati filmmaker. He graduated from the American University of Sharjah.

Al Mheiri began making films at age 14. He has made six short films since 2001. In 2005, Al Mheiri produced the documentary Under Construction, which was about a construction worker waiting to be paid.

He wrote the drama A Corsair's Tale in 2007. It portrays two battles of Ras al-Khaimah where the British bombed the city of Julphar. The movie takes place in Ras al-Khaimah and India.

Al Mheiri founded his own production company, Tent Pictures Productions, in 2013. His feature film, Abood Kandaishan, was filmed guerrilla-style with a small budget that was raised mostly from the Abu Dhabi National Oil Company. Al Mheiri created Abood Kandaishan to show what life is like in Emirati homes. The film premiered at the Dubai International Film Festival in December 2014.

Al Mheiri wrote the book, Kingdom of Peacocks – Mists of Time, the first of a trilogy, which is about the Portuguese invasion of an imaginary kingdom in the Persian Gulf in the early 1500s as an allegory to today's extremist groups.

== Filmography ==
- Under Construction (2005), producer
- A Corsair's Tale (2007), producer
- Abood Kandaishan (2014), producer, writer and director
