= American University of Sharjah =

University in Sharjah, United Arab Emirates

- الجامعة الأميركية في الشارقة
- Emblem of the American University of Sharjah
- Other name: AUS
- Type: Private university
- Established: 1997
- Affiliations: AAICU
- Chancellor: Tod A. Laursen
- President: Bodour bint Sultan bin Muhammad Al Qasimi
- Faculty: 390 (fall 2025)
- Administrative staff: 563
- Students: 6,727 (fall 2025)
- Undergraduates: 5,983 (fall 2025)
- Postgraduates: 531 (fall 2025)
- Doctoral students: 161 (fall 2025)
- Location: Sharjah, United Arab Emirates; 25°18′35″N 55°29′26″E
- Campus: Urban, 128 hectares (316 acres)
- Colors: Burgundy, White
- Mascot: Leopard
- Website: www.aus.edu
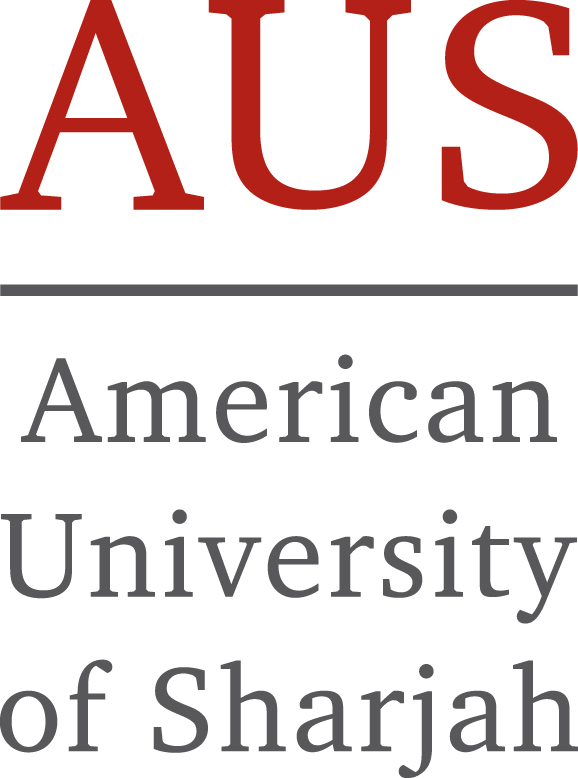

The American University of Sharjah (AUS; Arabic: الجامعة الأميركية في الشارقة) is a private university in Sharjah, United Arab Emirates. It was founded in 1997 by Sultan bin Muhammad Al-Qasimi, Supreme Council Member and Ruler of Sharjah. Located in University City in Sharjah, AUS has just under 7000 students from more than 94 countries and a full-time faculty of 380 from 58 countries.

AUS offers 26 majors and 48 minors at the undergraduate level, as well as 16 master's degrees, and a PhD in Engineering Systems Management. The university is organized into three colleges and one school.

The university is licensed by the Commission for Academic Accreditation of the Ministry of Higher Education and Scientific Research (UAE) in the United Arab Emirates. The American University of Sharjah is accredited in the United States by the Middle States Commission on Higher Education.

== History ==
The American University of Sharjah was founded in 1997 by the Emir of Sharjah, Sultan bin Muhammad Al-Qasimi.

AUS was granted a license by the UAE Ministry of Higher Education and Scientific Research in 1998 and held its first student council elections the same year. In the subsequent year, the university was granted a license by the UAE Commission for Academic Accreditation. The university launched its first graduate degree, a Master of Business Administration (MBA), in 2000 and held its first commencement the following year. The US Middle States Commission on Higher Education granted accreditation to the university in 2004.

In 2006, Emir Al-Qasimi inaugurated the new AUS Library. In 2010, the AUS Bachelor of Architecture degree program became the first outside of North America to be granted accreditation by the US National Architectural Accrediting Board (NAAB). In 2012, Forbes Middle East ranked the AUS MBA program as the best offered by a private university in the Gulf Region.

== Academics ==
American University of Sharjah is organized into four academic units: the College of Architecture, Art and Design, the College of Arts and Sciences, the College of Engineering, and the School of Business Administration. In 2025, AUS announced that it offered 33 undergraduate majors, 48 undergraduate minors, 20 master's degrees and eight PhD programs.

== Accreditation ==
American University of Sharjah is licensed in the United Arab Emirates, and its programs are accredited by the Commission for Academic Accreditation of the UAE Ministry of Education. It has also been accredited in the United States by the Middle States Commission on Higher Education since June 2004, with its most recent reaffirmation in 2019.

== Campus ==
The American University of Sharjah is situated in University City, 16 kilometers (10 miles) from the center of Sharjah City and about 25 kilometers from the neighboring emirate of Dubai.

The center of the AUS campus comprises 12 academic buildings. The academic buildings house classrooms and lecture halls; a library; laboratories; workshops and digital studios; and offices. The campus includes student residential halls and a large sports complex.

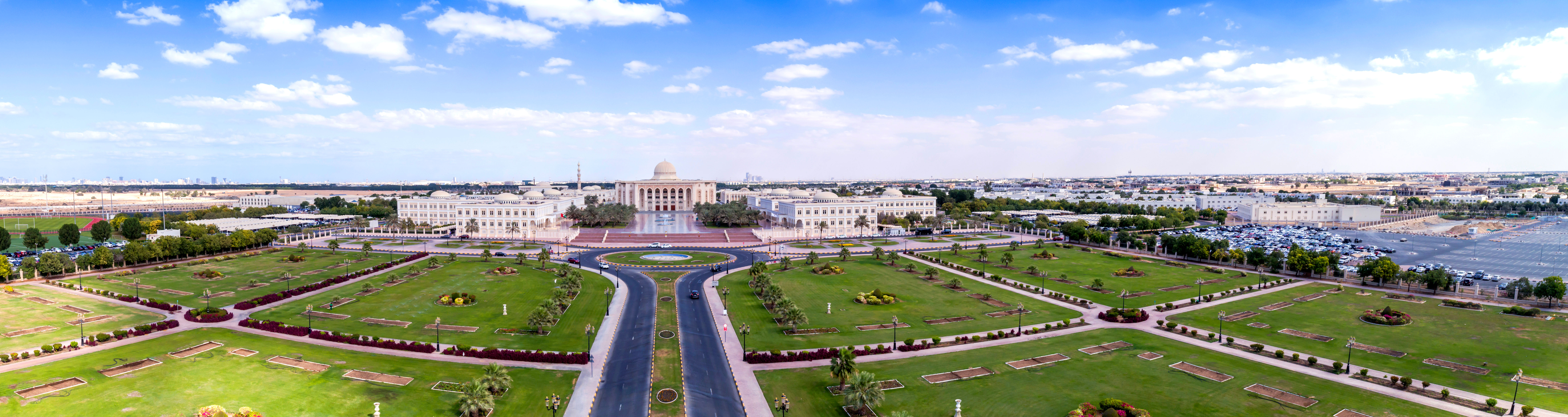

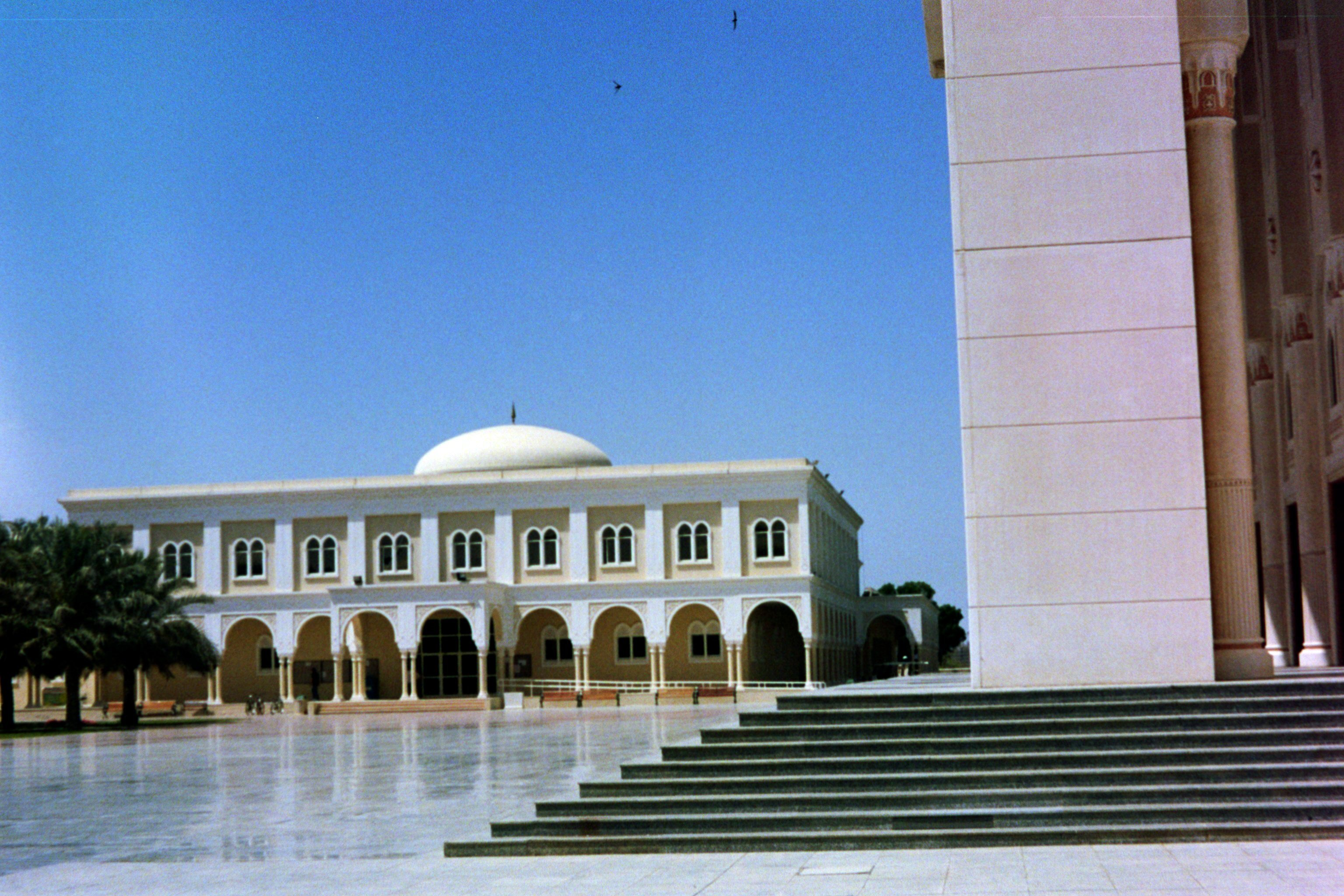
American University of Sharjah campus

The AUS Testing and Professional Development Center accommodates the placement tests for newly admitted AUS students as well as university testing. AUS is the sole testing center in the United Arab Emirates for the Fundamentals of Engineering Exam (FE) and Professional Engineering Exam (PE) administered by the National Council of Examiners for Engineering and Surveying.

=== Library ===
The AUS Library, an 11,000-square-meter facility, has a physical collection of 141,000 items in English; however, there are also materials available in Arabic. The library also has an online catalog system on its website. The seating capacity is approximately 800. The AUS Archives department is a repository for institutional records that have been created by various academic and administrative departments of the university.

== Global rankings ==
University rankings

Global – Overall
- QS World: =258 (2027)
- THE World: 501-600 (2026)
- USNWR Global: =1171 (2026)

The American University of Sharjah was ranked 124th in the Times Higher Education (THE) Young University Rankings in 2024. Additionally, AUS was ranked 143rd in the THE Asia University Rankings 2026.

In 2017 and 2018, the American University of Sharjah ranked first among universities globally by proportion of international students, according to Times Higher Education.

The American University of Sharjah is ranked 272nd according to the 2026 QS World University Rankings.

== Student life ==
=== Student Publications ===
Practical writing experience is available through three student publications: The Leopard, Realms, and Arabian Leopard.

=== Model United Nations ===
The American University of Sharjah Model United Nations, or AUSMUN, is an annual high school and university conference organized by the International Studies department at the American University of Sharjah in the United Arab Emirates.

== Office of International Exchange Programs ==
The Office of International Exchange Programs was established to allow its students and faculty to send and host visiting scholars. The program works with the students who wish to study at universities in other countries either for a semester or a year. The office also facilitates the admission of international students coming to AUS to study.

The Office of International Exchange Programs also administers processes enabling faculty-led study tours, visiting scholars, visiting guests, and delegations regarding international scholarships and internships.

== Notable alumni ==
- Sarah Al Amiri, Chair of the United Arab Emirates Council of Scientists and Deputy Project Manager of the Emirates Mars Mission
- Adib Fahim, an ex deputy intelligence director of Afghanistan
- Fadel Al Mheiri, filmmaker
- Fatma Ibrahim Al Sehlawi, architect and curator
- Mohammed Saeed Al Shehhi, media executive
- Mishal Hamed Kanoo, Chairman of The Kanoo Group
- Sheikha Lubna Khalid Al Qasimi, UAE Minister for Foreign Trade and former Minister of Economic and Planning (2004–2008); first woman to hold a ministerial post in the UAE
- Mona Kattan, CEO of Kayali.

== Gallery ==
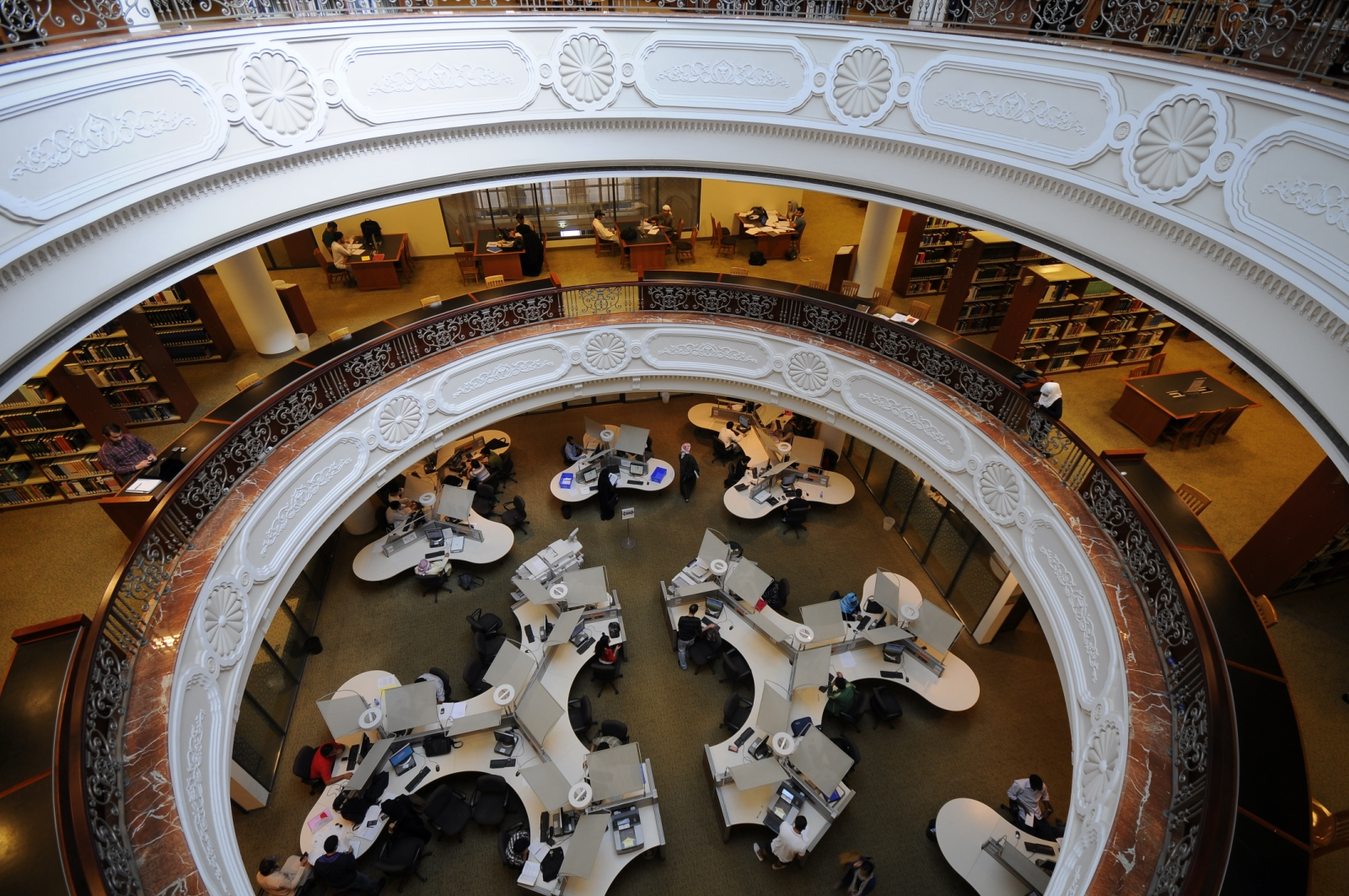
AUS Library

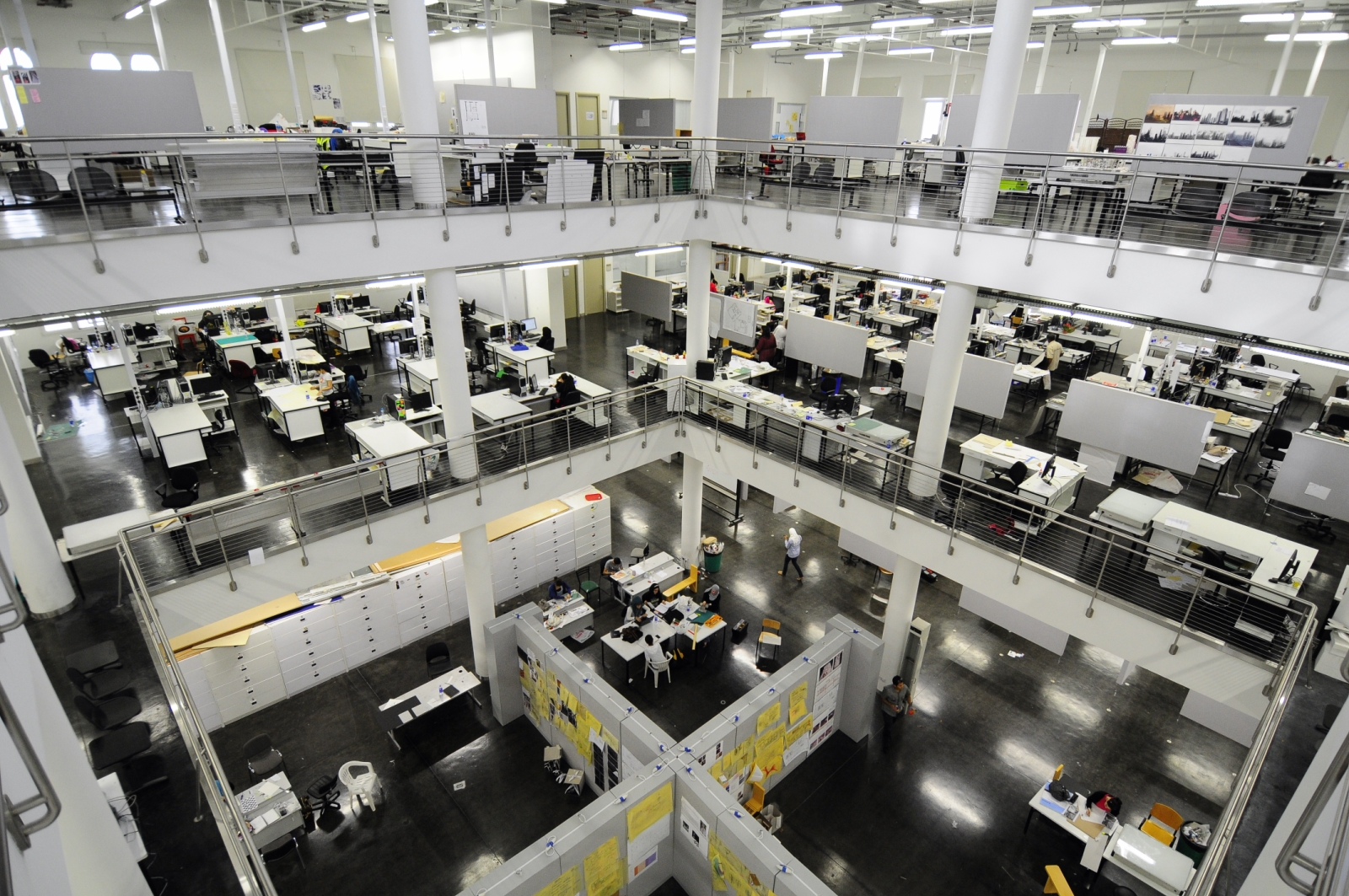
College of Architecture, Art and Design

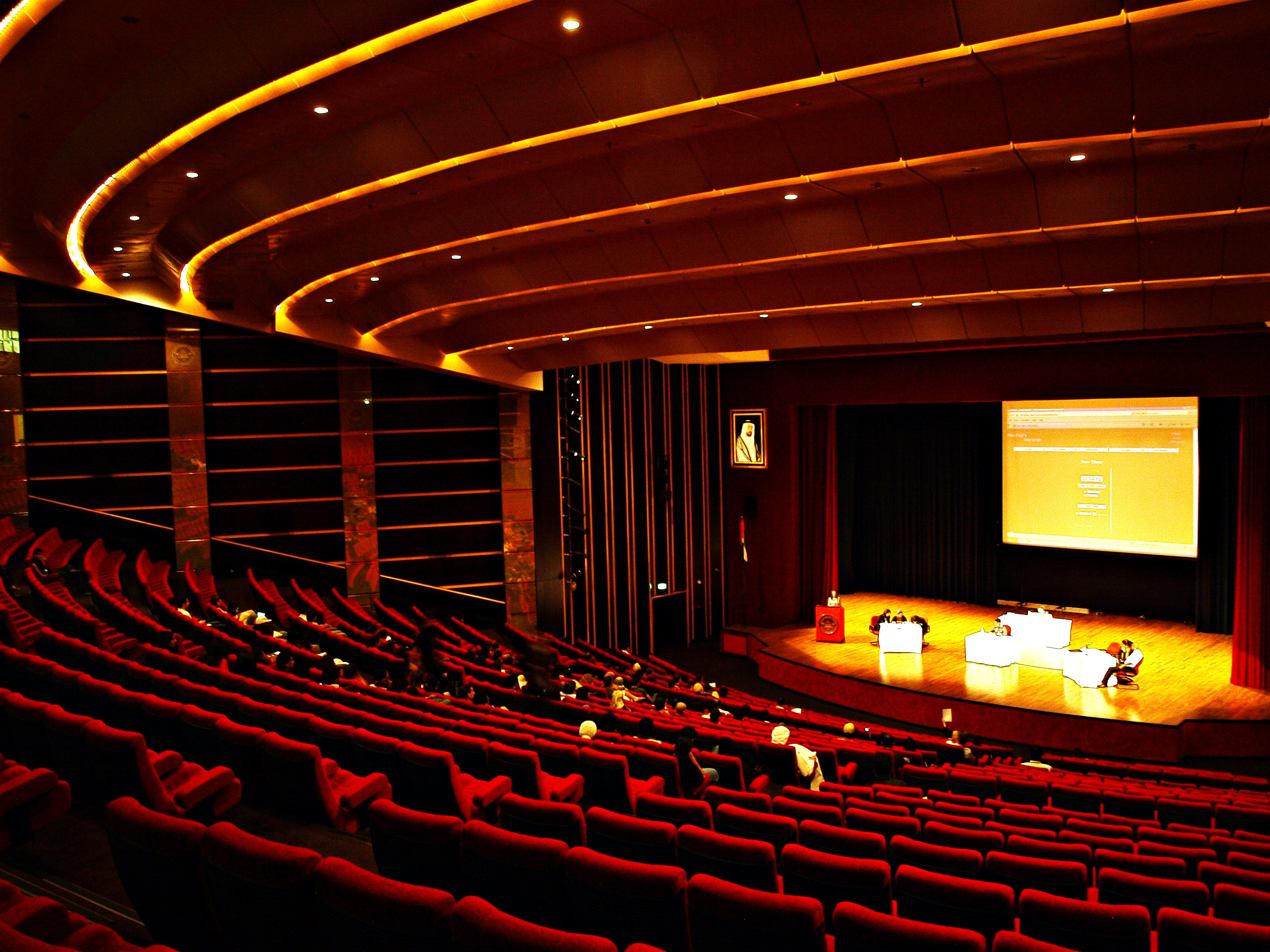
Main auditorium

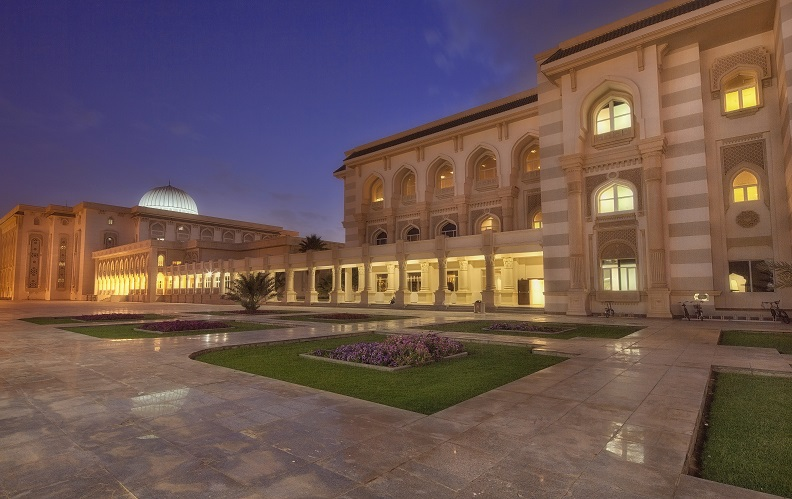
AUS campus

== See also ==
- Americans in the United Arab Emirates
