= Mohammed Saeed Al Shehhi =

Emirati media executive

Mohammed Saeed Al Shehhi is an Emirati media executive, Vice Chairman of National Media Authority, entrepreneur, and thoroughbred horse racing official. He served as the Secretary-General of the Emirates Media Council.

== Early life and education ==
Mohammed Saeed Al Shehhi studied in University of Sharjah, and in University of Leeds, United Kingdom.

== Career ==
From 2008 to 2010, Mohammed Saeed Al Shehhi served as Deputy CEO of Dubai Media Incorporated. In 2010–2012, he worked as Senior Director of Broadcast and Media Services at du Telecom.

Since 2012, Al Shehhi is CEO of A.R.M. Holding and Dubai Real Estate Center, and launched the real estate development company Huna. He previously served as CEO of Dubai Design District (d3) and left that post in January 2019. Al Shehhi was appointed Secretary-General of the Emirates Media Council on 15 March 2023 by a decree of Sheikh Mohamed bin Zayed Al Nahyan, President of the UAE.

In 2023, Al Shehhi led the UAE delegation to the Council of Arab Ministers of Information in Morocco. In 2024, he addressed the Executive Bureau of the Arab Ministers of Information.

=== Horse racing ===
Since September 2021, Al Shehhi has served as a board member and Director General of the Emirates Racing Authority.

In March 2024, he was elected Vice President of the Asian Racing Federation, the first Emirati and Arab to hold the position, helping to shape the Federation's five-year strategic plan. Since February 2025, he has chaired the Gulf Cooperation Council Horse Racing Coordination Council. He manages the stables of Sheikh Ahmed bin Rashid Al Maktoum.

=== Arts and cultural initiatives ===
Al Shehhi is an art collector who supports arts education in the UAE. A.R.M. Holding runs a large arts program for children, reaching more than 30,000 students from 80 schools each year. The company is also a principal partner of Art Dubai and established the first institutional art collection in Dubai, Dubai Collection.
