= Adib Fahim =

Deputy director general of Afghanistan's

- Born: Late 1980s Panjshir, Afghanistan
- Education: New York University
- Occupation: First deputy of Afghanistan National Directorate of Security
- Employer: Government of Afghanistan
- Parent: Mohammed Fahim

Adib Fahim is the former deputy director general of Afghanistan's National Directorate of Security. His father, Marshal Mohammad Fahim, was the first vice president of Afghanistan. Following the death of his father in March 2014, Adib was appointed as his father's successor in the social arena at a ceremony organized by then president Karzai in Afghanistan's Presidential Palace. He was featured on the Time Magazine and the National Public Radio (NPR).

== Early life ==
Fahim was born in the late 1980s. He grew up in Afghanistan during the Afghan Jihad. Later on he received a B.A. in international relations from the American University of Sharjah and a master's in public administration and policy from New York University. In 2010, Adib worked with a group of consultants who were assigned by the United Nations Development Programme and the Egyptian Ministry of Local Development to study decentralization planning and program in Egypt.

As a child, he accompanied his father to important meetings with commanders and later on he was seen regularly at his father’s side during meetings with diplomats and officials, or on official trips abroad.

He returned to Afghanistan to take up a job at the national security council (NSC) — on the advice of President Hamid Karzai, an ally of his father — and then moved on to the Foreign Ministry. At the NSC he worked as deputy director for policy and at the ministry of foreign affairs as the director general of the ministry for the Middle East and North Africa.

== First Deputy Director General of National Directorate of Security ==
After the formation of the National Unity Government of Afghanistan in 2015, Fahim was appointed as the second in command of the country's main intelligence agency, the National Directorate of Security NDS. In a rare public event, he was introduced to the organization by Dr. Abdullah Abdullah, Chief Executive Officer of the government. He said "Adib Fahim belongs to the family of Jihad and the mujahideen."

As the first deputy director general, he participated in high-level government decision making and traveled to different corners of the country to oversee and assess security situation. In 2015, while in Badakshan, he announced to the media the government's plans to organize the former Mujahideen to fight alongside the armed forces.

He stated that he focused on keeping the political stability of the institution intact and supported career growth opportunities for the younger generation.

On November 21, 2019, in a note on his Facebook account citing "personal reasons," he said he had submitted his resignation to President Ashraf Ghani. In a handwritten note, President Ghani approved his resignation.

== Political activities ==
He remained politically active often appearing in Dr. Abdullahe Abdullah's 2019 presidential campaign events. He attended the latter's presidential oath-taking ceremony in the Sapidar Palace.

In a speech at a public gathering in Kabul he emphasized on the important of coexistence and national unity in the country. He said "coexistence means mutual respect to everyone in the great nation of Afghanistan, coexistence also means foregoing group interests in favor of national interests."

On previous government of Afghanistan's peace negotiations he said that "we all hope for peace and cessation of violence in Afghanistan, for our people's sacrifices to be respected, and for the achievements of the Islamic republic to be safeguarded."

He was reported to have been a part of discussions on the role of the Jamiat Islami Party in the future of Afghanistan. He participated at a meeting of the party's leadership council held at chairman Salahuddin Rabbani's residence. Other participants included Dr. Abdullah Abdullah, Ata Muhammad Noor, Ismail Khan, and Kalimullah Naqibi.

In March 2021, the media reported that he was being considered for the post of foreign minister.

Later that month in an interview with the local TV Khurshid he said he was offered a post in the government but declined to accept as he preferred to focus on political affairs.

== Massacre of family members by the Taliban ==
On September 12, 2021, the media reported that the Taliban massacred civilians in the Panjshir Valley's Omarz village, the birthplace of Adib Fahim. Among those summarily executed by the Taliban were two of his close family members, a nephew of his father's, and his brother-in-law.
