= Joseph Sadan =

Israeli academic (1939–2025)

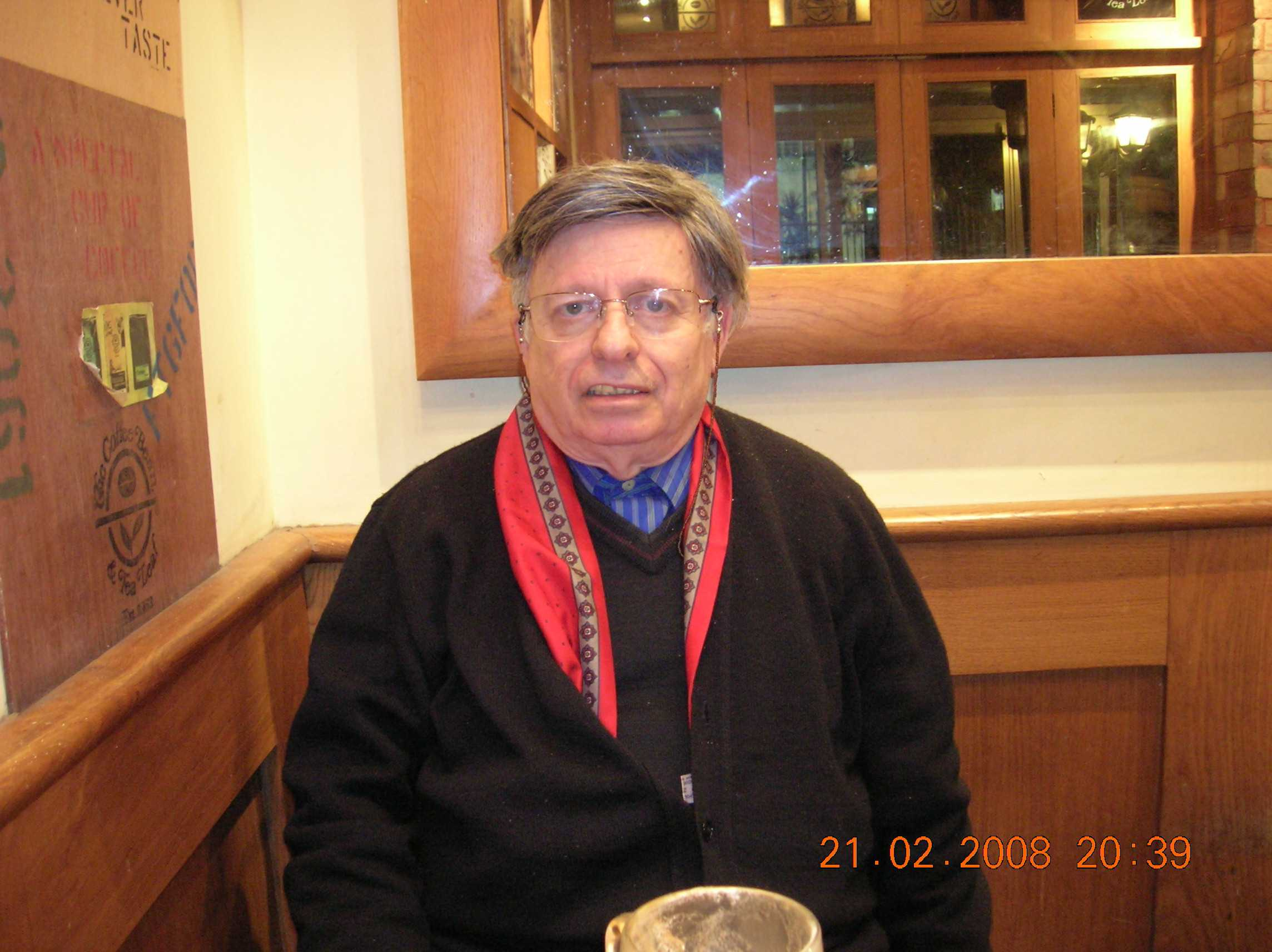
- Born: January 17, 1939
- Status: January 25, 2025 (aged 86)

Joseph Sadan (January 17, 1939 – January 25, 2025) was Israeli emeritus professor in the Department of Arabic and Islamic Studies at the Tel-Aviv University. He has also taught and researched at the Hebrew University of Jerusalem and research institutions in Europe, as well as at Haifa University and Menashe College. Sadan studied at the Hebrew University (1958–1963) where he received his BA and MA degrees (Profs. Joshua Blau, Eliahu Ashtor, M.J. Kister and others). Between 1965 and 1969/70 he worked on his Ph.D. thesis at the Sorbonne in Paris (Profs. Claude Cahen, Charles Pellat and Jeanine Sourdel-Thomine). The subject of the dissertation was furniture in the Middle East in medieval times. In 1989 he was promoted to Full Professor and retired in 2007. He held the Irene Helmus Chair for Arabic Literature until October 2009.

Sadan died on January 25, 2025, at the age of 86.

== His research ==
In his research, Joseph Sadan focused on social and material culture (furniture, drinks), medieval Arabic literature, especially prose (adab), and Jewish-Arab relations, including studies on Yehuda Alharizi and on the Sabbatean movement. In recent years he has also worked on the publication of forgotten stories, pre-modern novels of sorts on the Arabian Nights model (see below).

=== Furniture in the medieval Middle East ===
In 1976 Sadan's study Le mobilier Proche-Orient medieval was published by Brill, Leiden in 1976. In this book he focused on aspects of everyday life, especially among the lower classes, that had been ignored in the scholarly literature and are only very rarely mentioned in literary and historical texts. Sadan unearthed the relevant facts in chance comments found in texts and also in some works of art (iconography). He filled in missing information also through a perusal of dowry lists of Jewish brides discovered in the Cairo Geniza, mostly in Judeo-Arabic.

=== Still More Arabian Nights ===
Published in 2003 by Am Oved, this book consists of stories found in previously unpublished manuscripts. The quality and beauty of these stories would have made them good candidates for inclusion in The Arabian Nights, but fate decreed otherwise. The book reveals an entire world existing side-by-side with The Arabian Nights, of novel-like pre-modern compositions that reflect a measure of folk culture, a tradition of oral storytelling whose tales were occasionally also put to writing (whenever there are two versions of a story, they are not similar, since the narrator usually does not copy the story, but just tells it in a different way). A few noteworthy texts are replete with poetry and demonstrate quite clearly that even narrators of folktales in a sense continued the tradition of Classical Arabic poetry. Subsequently the book was published in a French edition under the title Et il y eut d'autres nuits (2004), and an Arabic edition is forthcoming. The texts claim to reflect Abbasid or Mamluk culture, but quite a few of the extant manuscripts are later, and are dated to the beginning of the Ottoman period.

=== Arab humor ===
In 2007 an improved edition of Sadan's book on Arab humor, which originally appeared in 1984/5, was published in Beirut and Cologne. Sadan studied the differences between canonical texts and a more folksy type of humor, various variations and even reversals of the same humorous theme, attributed to different people in different times. The need for humor in light of the stiff and boring atmosphere imposed by court etiquette gave rise to jokes and encouraged the presence of jokers and other strange characters, who engendered an enjoyable "anti-formality" atmosphere, for which there were specific terms in the medieval world. In other words, this is a literature of humor with a social background. The book focuses especially on witticisms concerning boring people (thuqalâ’). The reason for this is that in this culture good style, elegant speech and correct manners were highly appreciated, so bores became the butt of jokes.

=== Measuring the evolution of descriptive and figurative language in poetry ===
Joseph Sadan developed a method for assessing the evolution of figurative language in poetry. He calls his theory, which he expressed in text and diagrams, the "theory of ma'âni, in contrast to the usual theory of medieval poetics, the "theory of balâgha", from which it differs and which it complements. According to this theory one poet creates a figurative expression composed of various embellishments and metaphors; then a second poet will elaborate this expression, perhaps by repeating its content while changing some of its elements (such as rhyme and rhythm); then a third poet will elaborate on what the second poet wrote, and so on, with each successive poet using his predecessor's material as raw material. This also explains the fact that Hebrew poets in Spain took Arabic figurative expressions and transformed them into Hebrew using biblical concepts; these poets were merely adhering to an existing tradition of rhetorical elaboration in Arab culture, and should not be considered plagiarism. Two among Sadan’s PhD students who have taken up the study of ma'âni, as motifs in poetry. Among his many students, Dr. Nadir Masarwa and Dr. Mahmud Jabbarin, wrote their Ph.D. dissertation under Sadan's direction on this aspect of Arabic literature and enriched materials which should be taken into consideration (Masarwa’s thesis is now printed).

=== Writing customs, writing materials and how a geniza is created ===
Sadan compared the customs of Muslims and Jews concerning books that have become unusable because they are worn or (among Muslims) have become impure. This has significant implications for the Jewish institutions of geniza. Understanding both canonical and popular Muslim practice can help us understand the Jewish geniza, despite the differences. While brief instructions on how to store writings can be found in very early Jewish books (a subject studied by Menahem Haran, among others), in Islam the disputes, doubts, contradictions ad possibilities that were considered before the actual laws were formulated have also been preserved, and in fact accompanied them over time.

=== Islam and Judaism ===
Sadan has studied some less well-known connections between Arabic and Hebrew, Islam and Judaism, for example the Sabbatean movement in Yemen (a local movement whose ties to the original movement have been described by some as quite loose), and the anti-Jewish policies pursued by the Yemeni authorities following a revival that was perceived as a rebellion. Another issue that relates to Judaism and the study of Hebrew is Hebrew poetry that was influenced by Arabic poetry (see below: Alharizi). Sadan also wrote on matters of inter-religious strife, in the form of Muslim-Jewish polemics, and how each of these two faiths treat their holy scripture and holy places, such as the tombs of biblical prophets, especially Moses.

=== Craftsmen ===
Canonical fiction and official histories usually do not bother to provide descriptions of craftsmen and the people of the bazaars, such as goldsmiths, bakers, grave diggers and many others, with the exception of one genre that specifically deals with such craftsmen, occasionally somewhat humorously, especially in the way each specific craftsman speaks and what he says. This genre thus comes very close to drama. This has created a point of contact between Sadan's manuscripts and Prof. Shmuel Moreh's studies of Arab pre-modern "live theater"; they intend to publish a book on this subject, to be entitled Social Dramatic Dimensions and Strata: Two Medieval Egyptian Plays.

=== Alharizi ===
Joseph Sadan discovered an Arabic biography of the poet and writer Alharizi in a manuscript text by Ibn al-Sha'âr al-Mawsili. The biography is quite detailed, in line with the highly developed Arabic biographical literature of the time, and tells us where he lived, and when and where he died. The biographical details were collected from people who were acquainted with both Alharizi and the author of the text, knew about his writings and poems in Arabic (literary and not only Judeo-Arabic), and even report on the exact date of his death in Aleppo, in the year 1225. This date was not known previously, nor was his compositions in Arabic, intended for the ears of an aristocratic Muslim audience, known or their existence even suspected. A number of scholars (although not Haim Shirman) had claimed that Alharizi, who traveled throughout the Middle East and visited the region's Jewish communities, returned to his homeland Spain, where he finished writing his Tahkemoni. But Sadan discovered that he did not return to Spain, nor did he have any intention to do so (although in his writings he expresses his longing to his homeland); for him the Arab lands were the center of his culture, with which he was very familiar despite the fact that he hailed from Christian Spain. He also composed some quite excellent poetry in Arabic intended for the use of the princes of Syria, for which he was generously remunerated, in addition to the pay he received from Jews for writing Hebrew poetry and ornate prose for various communities.

=== Other topics ===
Among the other topics that Sadan studied are wine and drinking in Islam, etiquette, the ways of rulers, and the concept of justice.

=== Current research ===
In addition to his planned activities in connection with the Arabian Nights-like stories, Sadan plans to publish a historical study on the Buwayhid period, from about the mid-tenth to the mid-eleventh century, together with Adam Silberstein. The study will consist of an analysis of an anonymous manuscript of the period in question, which serves as a rich source of information on everyday life, government administration, and more.

== His Books ==
- Le mobilier au Proche-Orient médiéval, Leiden (E. J. Brill), 185 pp. and 42 drawings, 8 plates, 1976. Won the "Concours" of the CNRS (Centre National de la Recherche Scientifique, Paris).
- Nouvelle source de l'époque bÙyide (series: ḤaÃÁra, the Dept. of Arabic and the Dept. of Hist. of the Middle East & Africa), Tel Aviv, Tel Aviv, 1980.
- [In Arabic] Arabic Humoristic Literature and the Literary Genre 'Anecdotes on Boring Persons' (al-Adab al-hÁzil wa-nawÁdir al-thuqalÁ’) in the series: Literary Texts and Studies of the Tel Aviv University, No 5, at the SarÙjÐ Press, Acre, 1984-5.
- (With co-authors: P. Sj. van Koningsveld, Q. al-Samarrai) Yemenite Authorities and Jewish Messianism, published by the Documentatiebureau Islam-Christendom, Leiden (Leiden University, Faculty of Theology), 1990.
- [Hebrew] Still More Arabian Nights (Lo Elef ve-lo Layla), Tel Aviv (Am Oved; in the series of Sifrey Mofet), 2003.
- Et il y eut d'autres nuits, Paris (Editions Médicis-Entrelacs, Groupe Albin Michel), 2004. 175 pp.
- Second and improved edition of the §3: al-Adab al-hÁzil wa-nawÁdir al-thuqalÁ’, Cologne & Beirut (Kamel – Baghdad Editions; ManshÙrÁt al-Jamal), 2007.
