= Fuat Sezgin =

Turkish historian of Arabic-Islamic science (1924–2018)

- Born: 24 October 1924; Bitlis, Turkey
- Died: 30 June 2018 (aged 93); Istanbul, Turkey
- Education: Istanbul University
- Occupation: Science historian academic
- Spouse: Ursula Sezgin
- Awards: King Faisal International Prize; Order of Merit of the Federal Republic of Germany; Presidential Culture and Arts Grand Awards

Fuat Sezgin (24 October 1924 – 30 June 2018) was a Turkish scholar and researcher who specialized in the history of science in the medieval Islamic world. He was professor for the History of Natural Science at Johann Wolfgang Goethe University in Frankfurt, Germany and the founder and honorary director of the Institute for the History of the Arab Islamic Sciences there. He also created museums in Frankfurt and Istanbul with replicas of historical Arabic-Islamic scientific instruments, tools and maps. His best known publication is the 17-volume update to the History of the Arabic Written Tradition (Geschichte des Arabischen Schrifttums), a standard reference in the field.

== Career ==
Sezgin earned his Ph.D. from Istanbul University under the German Orientalist Hellmut Ritter in 1950. His thesis titled "Buhari’nin Kaynakları" (The Sources of Al-Bukhari) argued that, contrary to the common belief among European orientalists, Al-Bukhari's edition of collected Hadiths was based on written sources dating back to the 7th century as well as oral history. He obtained a position at Istanbul University, but was dismissed in the wake of the 1960 coup. He moved to Germany in 1961 and started working as a visiting professor at the University of Frankfurt. He was appointed professor at the university in 1965. His research in Frankfurt focused on Islam's Golden Age of Science. In 1982, Sezgin established the Institute of the History of the Arab Islamic Sciences. Today the Institute houses the most comprehensive collection of texts on the history of Arabic-Islamic science in the world. In 1983 Sezgin also founded a unique museum within the institute, bringing together more than 800 replicas of historical scientific instruments, tools and maps, mostly belonging to the Golden Age of Islamic science. A very similar museum was opened in 2008 in Istanbul, located next to Gülhane.

In 1968, Sezgin found four previously unknown books of Diophantus' Arithmetica at the shrine of Imam Rezā in the holy Islamic city of Mashhad in northeastern Iran.

== Publications ==
Fuat Sezgin was the author and editor of numerous publications. His 17-volume update to the Geschichte des Arabischen Schrifttums (1967-2000) is the cornerstone reference on the history of science and technology in the Islamic world. The 5-volume Natural Sciences of Islam documents the items in the Frankfurt museum. He had, since 1984, edited the Journal for the History of Arabic-Islamic Science.

Sezgin argued that Muslim seafarers had reached the Americas by 1420, citing as evidence the inscription on a map and the fact that the high longitudinal precision of early maps of the Americas would not have been attainable using Western navigational technology.

== Awards ==
Sezgin received several awards, including the King Faisal International Prize of Islamic Studies in 1978 and Order of Merit of the Federal Republic of Germany. He was a member of the Turkish Academy of Sciences, the Academy of the Kingdom of Morocco and academies of Arabic Language in Cairo, Damascus and Baghdad.

== Recognition ==
On 24 September 2012, Melih Gökçek, Mayor of Municipality of Metropolitan Ankara, announced that a square in Ankara was to be named in honor of Fuat Sezgin. A relief of him, created by artist Aslan Başpınar, in the square was revealed by the mayor, in the presence of Fuat Sezgin and his spouse Ursula.
