= History of the Arabic Written Tradition =

German reference work for Arabic literature

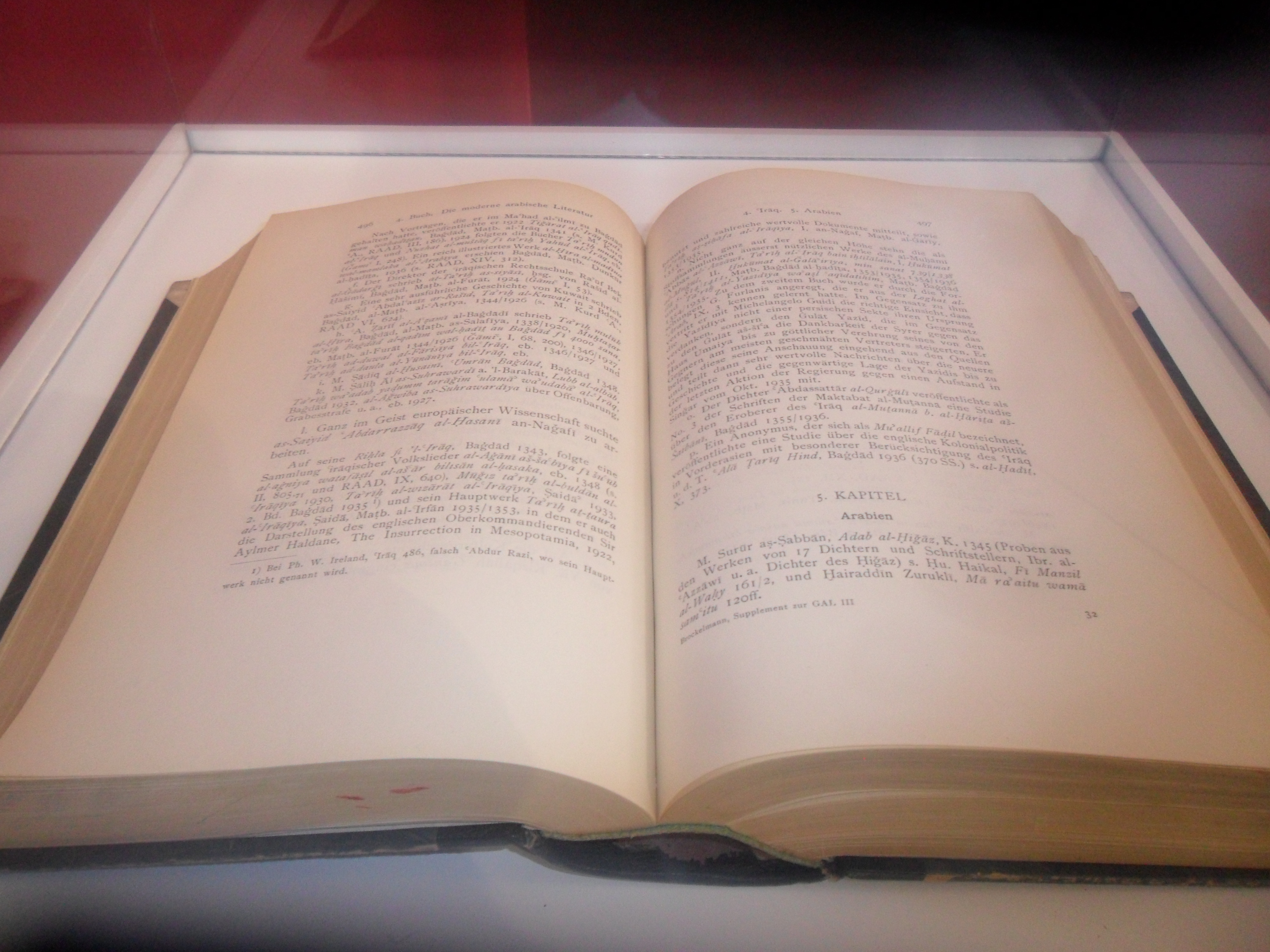
- Geschichte der arabischen Litteratur 1909 - Carl Brockelmann
- Author: Carl Brockelmann
- Original title: Geschichte der arabischen Litteratur

History of the Arabic Written Tradition (German: Geschichte der arabischen Litteratur, or GAL) is a reference work produced by the German scholar Carl Brockelmann and first published in two editions by Brill in Leiden in 1898 and 1902. His survey was limited to works written in Arabic and included only extant titles; writings by Muslim authors in other languages and works known solely through quotations or references were excluded, as were titles by non-Muslim authors.

It lists around 25,000 individual works by some 18,000 authors from the Arabic literary tradition. Over the years other academics would add volumes to the work, for example Fuat Sezgin has updated Brockelmann's list by adding some 12,000 titles and 9,000 writers.

== Publication ==
The first edition of the work was first published in two volumes (1898–1902), and aimed to give a framework which divided Arabic literature into periods and subjects. However, Brockelmann later wrote a series of three Supplementbände ('supplement volumes') that vastly expanded the original work and then revised the original volumes, so the final work comprised the following:

- Brockelmann, Carl (1943). Geschichte der arabischen Litteratur. Vol. Band I (2. den Supplementbänden angepasste Auflage ed.). Leiden: Brill.
- Brockelmann, Carl (1949). Geschichte der arabischen Litteratur. Vol. Band II (2. den Supplementbänden angepasste Auflage ed.). Leiden: Brill.
- Brockelmann, Carl (1937). Geschichte der arabischen Litteratur. Vol. Supplementband I (1. Auflage ed.). Leiden: Brill.
- Brockelmann, Carl (1938). Geschichte der arabischen Litteratur. Vol. Supplementband II (1. Auflage ed.). Leiden: Brill.
- Brockelmann, Carl (1942). Geschichte der arabischen Litteratur. Vol. Supplementband III.1–2 (1. Auflage ed.). Leiden: Brill.

Between 2016 and 2018, GAL was published by Brill in an updated English translation as History of the Arabic Written Tradition.

== Influence ==
The work is considered a classic of Orientalist scholarship and it remains a fundamental reference volume for all Arabic literature. Abd ar-Rahman Badawi in his Encyclopedia of Orientalists describes it as "the single and essential source for everything relating to Arabic manuscripts and the places where they are kept."
