= Adib Farhadi =

- Born: June 16, 1972 (age 54); Kabul, Afghanistan
- Education: B.S. East Carolina University (1994); Master Degree New York University (1996); Ph.D. University of Canberra (2014)

Afghan Deputy Minister of Commerce
- Website: www.adibfarhadi.com

Adib Farhadi (born 1972) is an Associate Professor of Peace and Conflict at the University of South Florida, where he also serves as the Faculty Director of the Executive Education Program. Farhadi is a former Afghanistan Deputy Minister of Commerce.

== Early life and education ==
Farhadi was born in Kabul, Afghanistan and raised in Greenville, North Carolina, where he attended Rose High School. Farhadi earned his B.S. Degree at East Carolina University in 1994, his master's degree at New York University in 1996 and his Ph.D. in economy at University of Canberra in 2014. Farhadi completed his doctoral thesis, "Stabilization for Sustainable Economic Growth in Fragile States: The Case for a Trade-Based Regional Economic Integration Silk Road Strategy" under the supervision of Professor Mark Evans. Farhadi completed a post-doctoral fellowship at University of Canberra's Institute for Governance & Policy Analysis.

== Professional work ==
As of 2024, Farhadi is a tenured Associate Professor of Peace and Conflict at the University of South Florida, where he also serves as the Faculty Director of the Executive Education Program. His research focuses on the intersection of geoeconomics, geopolitics, and human dynamics, with a particular emphasis on the Great Power Competition in the "Silk Road" region of Central and South Asia. In addition to his academic roles, Farhadi serves as Editor-in-Chief of The Great Power Competition book series, Co-Principal Investigator for the Great Power Competition Initiative and the Global Influence Index, and Faculty Advisor to the Global and National Security Institute.

Farhadi is the 2024 recipient of USF's prestigious "Distinguished Service Award."

Formerly, Farhadi served in senior positions for Afghanistan and extensively advised and contributed research for the United States government, the United Nations, and other international organizations. He is a frequent presenter on religion, conflict and peacebuilding, Great Power Competition, Sustainable Development, Countering Violent Extremism (CVE), and the geoeconomics of the Middle East and CASA region.

In 2012 Farhadi was a visiting scholar at Johns Hopkins University, School of Advanced International Studies (SAIS). Farhadi has championed targeting aid for Afghans to what the Afghan themselves need rather than the donors' preferences, as he had in 2012 while a researcher with the Australia New Zealand School of Government's Institute for Governance (ANZIG).

Circa 2002, Farhadi served as the executive director of Afghanistan National Development Strategy, director of Economic Affairs in the Ministry of Foreign Affairs, Deputy Minister of Commerce & Industry, Chief Negotiator for WTO accession and senior advisor to the New Silk Road Initiative for the Afghan government. Farhadi has been recognized by the United Nations and the Italian and Afghan governments for his work on the Afghanistan's Millennium Development Goals. and Afghanistan National Development Strategy (ANDS)

Farhadi is published with several citations, including books such as Countering Violent Extremism by Winning Hearts and Minds (2020).

== Partial bibliography ==
Books

• Farhadi, A. (2020) Countering Violent Extremism by Winning Hearts and Minds. Switzerland: Springer Press.

Chapters

• Farhadi, A. (2023) Russia’s Invasion of Ukraine: Evolving Crises and Economic Power Politics in the Central Asia-South Asia (CASA) Region. In: Farhadi, A., Grzegorzewski, M., & Masys, A.J. (eds.) Great Power Competition Volume 5: Russia’s Invasion of Ukraine. Springer Press.

• Farhadi, A. (2023) Lessons Learned from Afghanistan: The Heavy Price of Treating Long-Term Strategic Issues with Short-Term Tactical Approaches. In: Farhadi A. and Masys, A.J. (eds.) Great Power Competition Volume 4: Lessons from Afghanistan: America's Longest War. Springer Press.

• Farhadi, A. (2022) Post-9/11 Radicalization Theory and Its Impact on Violent Extremism. In: Masys, A.J. (ed.) Handbook of Security Science. Springer Press.

• Farhadi, A. (2022) Countering Violent Extremism in Central Asia and South Asia: Islamophobia and Cyber-Radicalization in the Digital Era. In: Farhadi, A., Sanders, R. & Masys, A.J. (eds.) Great Power Competition Volume 3: Cyberspace: The Fifth Domain. Springer Press.

• Farhadi, A. (2021) From the Great Power Competition to Great Power Cooperation: Strategic Lessons from a Pandemic. In: Farhadi, A. and Masys, A.J. (eds.) Great Power Competition Volume 2: Contagion Effect: Radicalization, Unrest, and Competition in the COVID-19 Era. Springer Press.

• Farhadi, A. (2020) Conceptualizing the Great Power Competition and U.S. Geoeconomic Strategy for the Central and South Asia (CASA) Region. In: Farhadi A. and Masys, A.J. (eds.) Great Power Competition: Regional Perspectives in the Central Region. Springer Press.

• Farhadi et al. (2022) The Cyber Pandemic that Could Redefine the Great Power Competition: Preparing the Defense Industrial Base. In: Farhadi, A., Sanders, R. & Masys, A.J. (eds.) Great Power Competition Volume 3: Cyberspace: The Fifth Domain. Springer Press.

• Farhadi, A. and Galloway, I. (2021) Building Trust and Advancing U.S. Geoeconomic Strength Through Public–Private Partnership Stakeholder Capitalism. In: Farhadi, A. and Masys, A.J. (eds.) Great Power Competition Volume 2: Contagion Effect: Radicalization, Unrest, and Competition in the COVID-19 Era. Springer Press.

• Farhadi, A. and Bekdash, A. (2020) Afghanistan's Lithium as Strategic U.S. Focus in the Great Power Competition. In: Farhadi, A. and Masys, A.J. Great Power Competition: Regional Perspectives in the Central Region. Springer Press.

Edited Volumes

• Farhadi, A., Grzegorzewski, M., & Masys, A.J. (2023) Great Power Competition Volume 5: Russia’s Invasion of Ukraine. Springer Press.

• Farhadi, A. and Masys, A. J. (2023) Great Power Competition Volume 4: Lessons from Afghanistan: America's Longest War. Springer Press.

• Farhadi, A., Sanders, R. & Masys, A.J. (2022) Great Power Competition Volume 3: Cyberspace: The Fifth Domain. Springer Press.

• Farhadi, A. and Masys, A.J. (2021) Great Power Competition Volume 2: Contagion Effect: Radicalization, Unrest, and Competition in the COVID-19 Era. Springer Press.

• Farhadi, Adib and Masys, A. J. (2020) Great Power Competition Volume 1: Regional Perspectives in the Central Region. Springer Press.

Papers

- Starr, S.F. with Farhadi, A. (2012) Finish the Job: Jump-Start Afghanistan's Economy, A Handbook of Projects, SILK ROAD PAPER, November. Central Asia-Caucasus Institute & Silk Road Studies Program.
