= MBR Explorer =

Planned UAESA mission to the Asteroid belt

- Mission type: Asteroid multiple-flyby/orbiter/lander
- Operator: Mohammed bin Rashid Space Centre
- Mission duration: Flyby phase: 8.5 years Orbiter phase: 7 months

Start of mission
- Launch date: March 2028
- Rocket: H3
- Launch site: Tanegashima, LA-Y2
- Contractor: Mitsubishi Heavy Industries

Flyby of Venus (gravity assist)
- Closest approach: July 2028

Flyby of Earth (gravity assist)
- Closest approach: May 2029

Flyby of 10253 Westerwald
- Closest approach: February 2030

Flyby of 623 Chimaera
- Closest approach: June 2030

Flyby of 13294 Rockox
- Closest approach: January 2031

Flyby of Mars (gravity assist)
- Closest approach: September 2031

Flyby of 88055 Ghaf
- Closest approach: July 2032

Flyby of 23871 Ousha
- Closest approach: December 2032

Flyby of 59980 Moza (Note: The name "Moza" was mistakenly given to asteroid (59880) 1999 RS119 on 13 October 2025, but was swiftly corrected on the same date.)
- Closest approach: August 2033

269 Justitia orbiter
- Orbital insertion: October 2034

269 Justitia lander
- Landing date: May 2035
- Emirates Planetary Programme

The MBR Explorer is a planned UAESA space probe designed to journey to seven different main belt asteroids. Proposed under the Emirates Mission to the Asteroid Belt, it is named in recognition of the foundational role driving the creation and growth of the UAE Space Program played by Sheikh Mohammed bin Rashid Al Maktoum, the vice president and the prime minister of the United Arab Emirates.

== Overview ==
Similarly to their previous Mars mission, the MBR Explorer will launch from Tanegashima Space Center, this time on an H3 Launch Vehicle. The spacecraft will weigh around 2.8 tonnes and will travel at an average speed of 33,000 km/h.

== Asteroids ==
The MBR Explorer will visit asteroids 10253 Westerwald, 623 Chimaera, 13294 Rockox, 88055 Ghaf, 23871 Ousha, and 59980 Moza during a 5-billion-kilometre total journey, and will attempt to orbit its seventh and final asteroid, 269 Justitia in 2034. The spacecraft will additionally drop off a small lander to set down on Justitia's surface.

At the time when MBR Explorer was proposed, Ghaf (2000 VA_{28}), Ousha (1998 RC_{76}), and Moza (1999 SG_{6}) were unnamed and were known by their provisional designations. All three of these asteroids were officially named on 13 October 2025.

== History ==
The mission to explore the asteroid belt was announced by the UAE Space Agency in May 2023. Its launch was planned for March 2028 at that time.

== See also ==
- List of minor planets and comets visited by spacecraft
- Lucy, an ongoing NASA mission that will similarly fly by various Jupiter trojans.
- DESTINY+, a planned JAXA mission that may fly past multiple near-Earth asteroids.
