= 269 Justitia =

Red main-belt asteroid

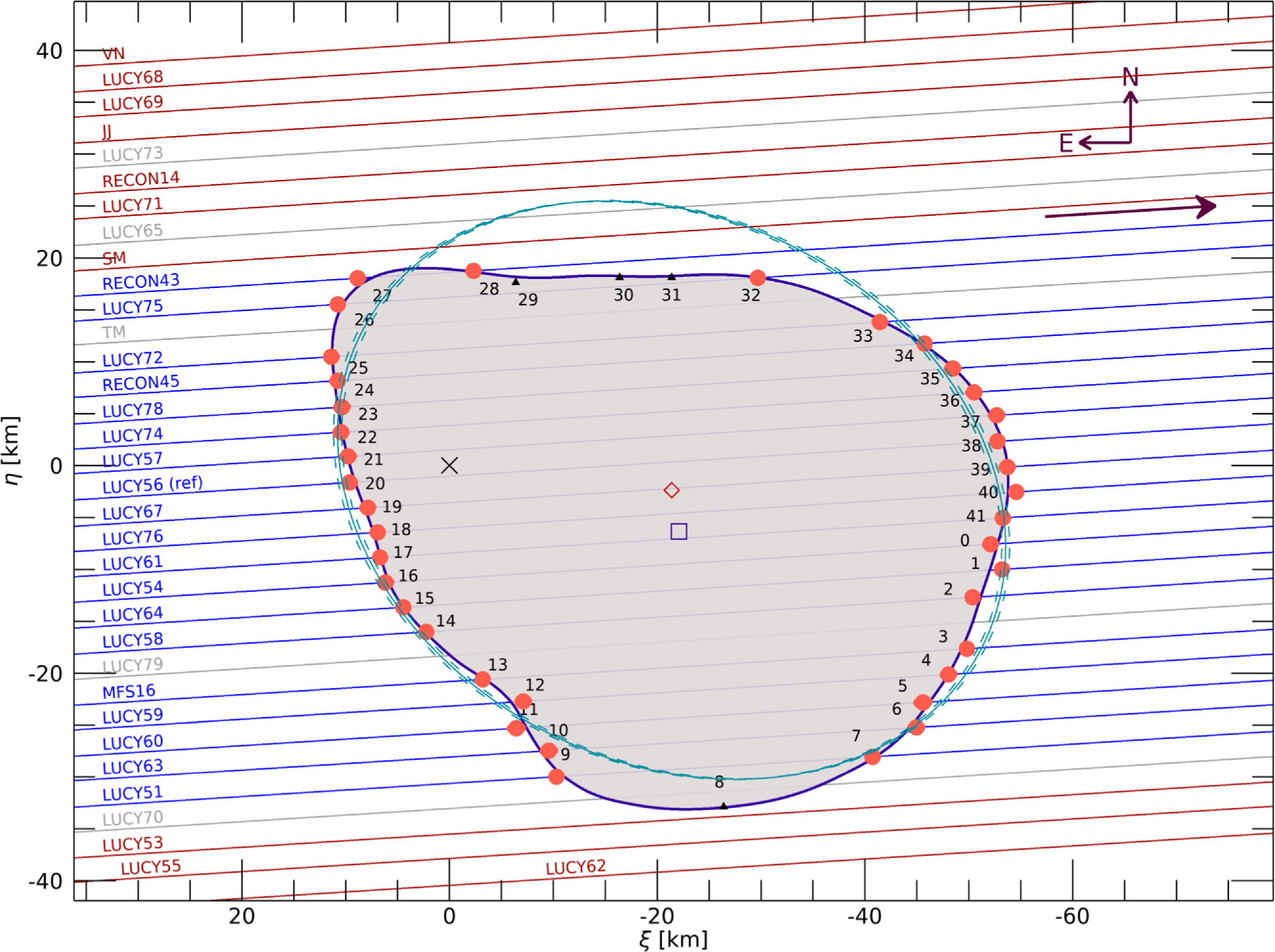
- Shape of Justitia as seen by stellar occultation observations on 31 August 2023

Discovery
- Discovered by: Johann Palisa
- Discovery site: Vienna Obs.
- Discovery date: 21 September 1887

Designations
- Pronunciation: /dʒʌˈstɪʃiə/
- Named after: Justitia
- Alternative designations: A887 SA; 1942 XY
- Minor planet category: Main belt (middle) · background

Orbital characteristics
- Epoch 5 May 2025 (JD 2460800.5)
- Uncertainty parameter 0
- Aphelion: 3.179 AU
- Perihelion: 2.048 AU
- Semi-major axis: 2.613 AU
- Eccentricity: 0.2164
- Orbital period (sidereal): 4.22 yr (1,543 d)
- Mean anomaly: 244.365°
- Mean motion: 0° 13^{m} 59.88^{s} / day
- Inclination: 5.477°
- Longitude of ascending node: 156.503°
- Argument of perihelion: 120.144°

Physical characteristics
- Dimensions: 64.60 × 58.34 × 46.60 km ± (2.86 × 2.64 × 2.60 km) (Note: Parker et al. (2024) give Justitia's ellipsoid dimensions in terms of semi-axes, or radii along the x, y, and z axes. The dimensions listed here are twice the semi-axis values.)
- Mean diameter: 57.0–57.8 km (occultation); 58±2 km (thermophysical)
- Synodic rotation period: 33.12962 ± 0.00001 h (1.38040083 ± 4.2×10^{−7} d)
- Axial tilt: 171°±15° (to ecliptic) (Note: Marciniak et al. (2025) give the ecliptic latitude of Justitia's rotational north pole direction, β) = −81°±15°. Subtracting β from +90° (the ecliptic north pole latitude) gives Justitia's axial tilt with respect to the ecliptic: i = 90° – β = 171°±15°.)
- Pole ecliptic longitude: 73°±11° (Note: Although Marciniak et al. (2025) give two possible rotational north pole orientations for Justitia, they note that the August 2023 occultation rules out the mirror solution (Pole 2), leaving Pole 1 (λ) = 73°±11°, β) = −81°±15°) as the preferred solution.)
- Pole ecliptic latitude: −81°±15° (Note: pole)
- Geometric albedo: 0.072±0.007 (occultation); 0.058±0.006 (thermophysical)
- Spectral type: RR or IR (TNO classification); Z-type asteroid Ld-type (SMASSII classification); D-type (Bus–DeMeo classification)
- Apparent magnitude: 12–15
- Absolute magnitude (H): 9.82

269 Justitia is an asteroid located in the middle main asteroid belt. It was discovered on 21 September 1887 by Austrian astronomer Johann Palisa at Vienna Observatory and was named after Justitia, the Roman goddess of justice. The asteroid is about 58 kilometres (36 mi) in diameter and rotates relatively slowly, with a rotation period of 33.1 hours. Justitia is one of the targets of the United Arab Emirates' upcoming MBR Explorer mission, which will visit seven different asteroids in the asteroid belt during the 2030s. MBR Explorer is planned to enter orbit around Justitia via rendezvous in 2034 and will end its mission after dropping a lander to the asteroid's surface in 2035.

Justitia is unusual in that it has a much redder color compared to any other asteroid in the asteroid belt. Spectroscopic observations show that Justitia's color and composition appears to resemble those of centaurs and trans-Neptunian objects from the outer Solar System, whose surfaces are composed of ices and complex organic compounds (tholins). Hence, researchers believe that Justitia originated from the outer Solar System and then migrated inward to its present-day location in the asteroid belt. Only a few other asteroids have been identified to exhibit very red colors like Justitia, with 203 Pompeja and 732 Tjilaki as examples from the main asteroid belt.

== Discovery and name ==
Justitia was discovered on 21 September 1887 by Austrian astronomer Johann Palisa, who at the time was mapping the sky and searching for asteroids by eye using the Vienna Observatory's 12-inch refractor telescope. Justitia was the 60th asteroid discovered by Palisa, who discovered a total of 122 asteroids over his lifetime. Palisa reported his discovery to the Central Bureau for Astronomical Telegrams and the asteroid was announced as the 269th minor planet discovery in a notice published in the Astronomische Nachrichten journal on 22 September 1887.

The name Justitia was given by August Biela, a private observatory owner and friend of Palisa. Justitia is the Roman goddess of justice and the daughter of Jupiter and Astraea (who has an asteroid named 5 Astraea). The Greek equivalent of Justitia is Themis, who also has an asteroid named 24 Themis.

== Orbit ==
Justitia is located in the middle section of the main asteroid belt (2.50–2.82 AU), where it orbits the Sun at an average distance of 2.61 AU (390 million km; 243 million mi). During its 4.2-year orbital period, Justitia's distance from the Sun varies from 2.05 AU at perihelion to 3.18 AU at aphelion due to its moderately elliptical orbit, which has an eccentricity of 0.216. Justitia has a low orbital inclination of 5.5° with respect to the ecliptic plane. Justitia is classified as a background asteroid because it does not belong to any known asteroid family.

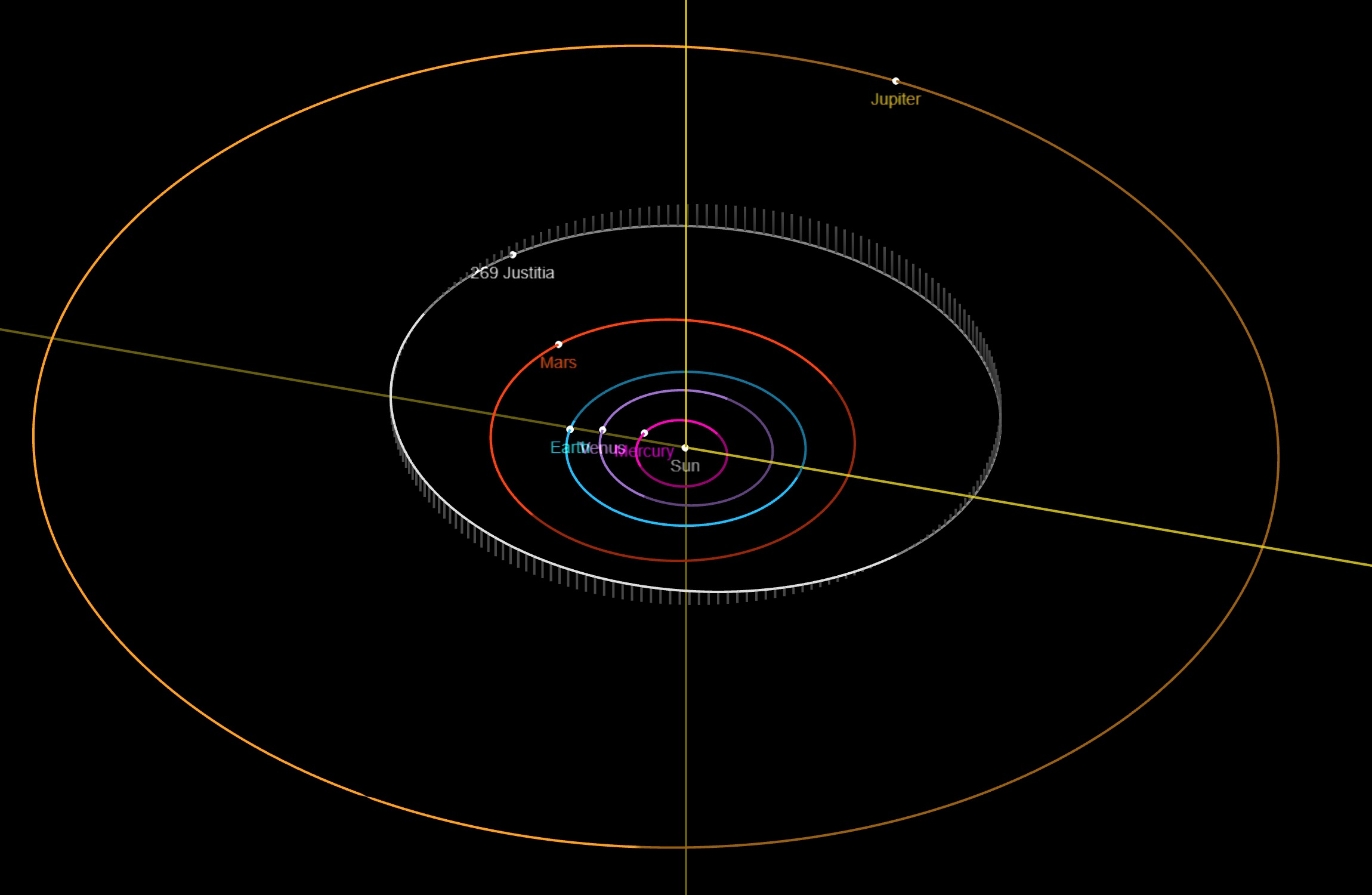
Diagram of Justitia's orbit with other planets

== Physical characteristics ==
=== Shape and rotation ===
Justitia's size and shape has been directly measured via observations of a stellar occultation on 31 August 2023, when the asteroid passed in front of a background star and briefly blocked out its light. Multiple observation locations were closely spaced to each other and spread over a large area to cover the entirety of the predicted width of the Justitia's shadow cast on Earth, allowing for the resolution of the asteroid's shape in high detail. The occultation revealed that Justitia has a volume-equivalent diameter of 57.0 or 57.8 km (35.4 or 35.9 mi), with the larger value being preferred by Marc Buie and collaborators who analyzed the occultation observations. Justitia was revealed to be highly irregular in shape, with at least three large facets 23–38 km (14–24 mi) in length being observed.

Observations of Justitia's light curve, or brightness fluctuations over time, show that it has a relatively slow rotation period of about 33.1 hours, accurately measured to an uncertainty less than a tenth of a second. Justitia has a retrograde rotation, meaning it rotates backwards relative to its orbit direction and has its rotational north pole pointed toward the ecliptic south. Although observations based on light curves alone suggested two possible rotation pole orientations for Justitia, the August 2023 occultation by Justitia eliminated this ambiguity.

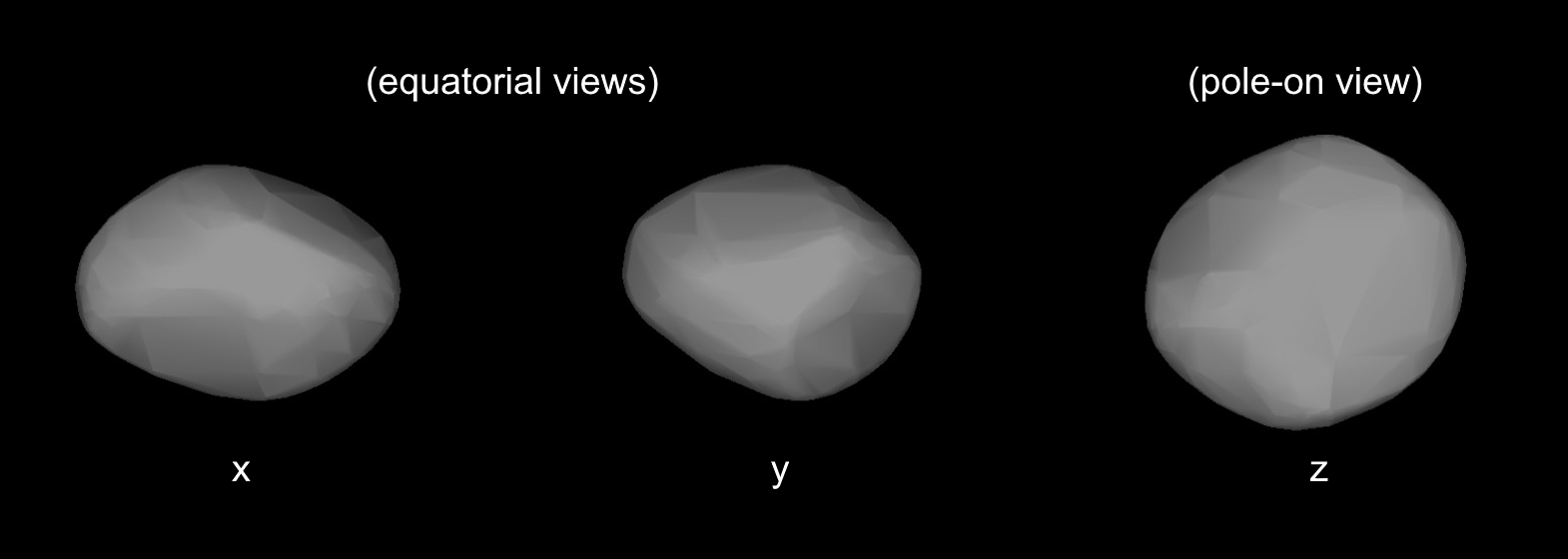
Three mutually orthogonal views of Justitia's shape model constructed from its rotational light curve

=== Surface, color, and spectrum ===
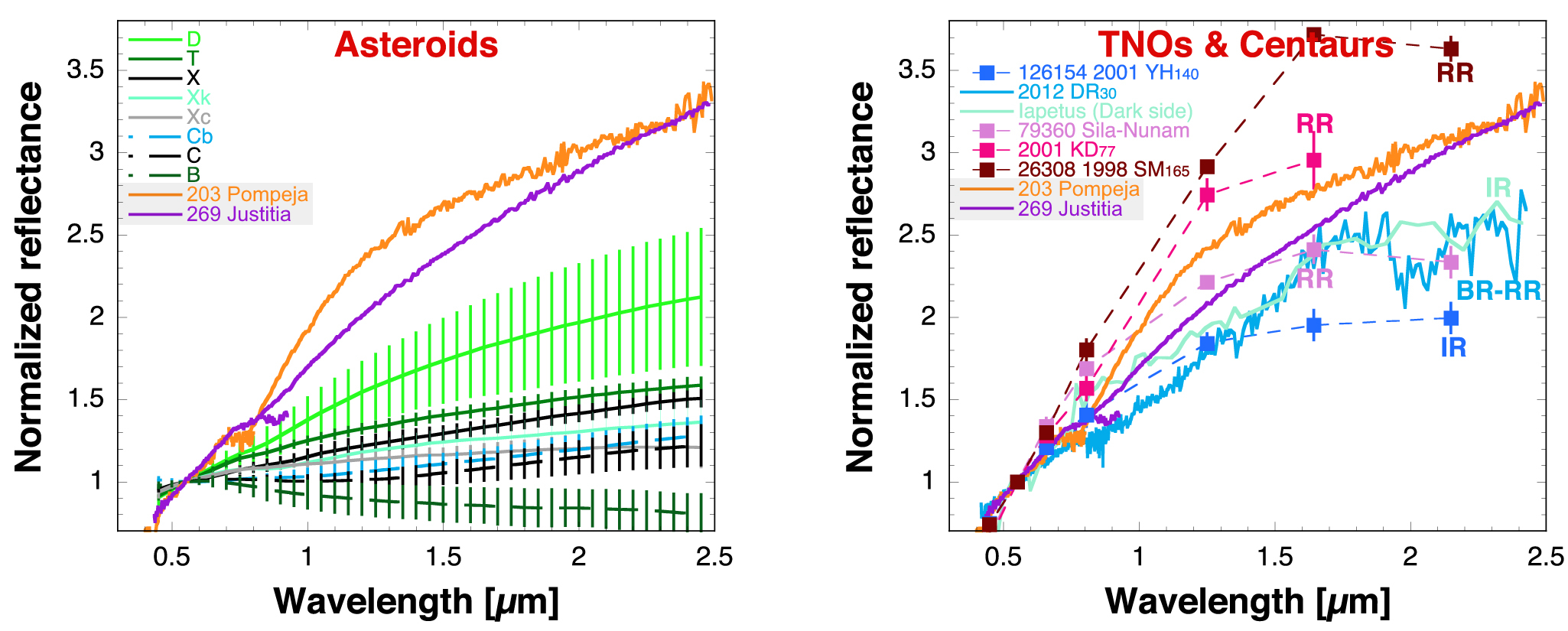
Comparison of the very red spectra of asteroids Pompeja (orange) and Justitia (purple) with other Solar System bodies. The spectra of Pompeja and Justitia match best with those of trans-Neptunian objects (TNOs), suggesting similar compositions.

The surface of Justitia is very dark, with a geometric albedo between 0.06 and 0.07. Thermophysical modelling of the asteroid indicates it has a very rough surface with small regolith grain sizes. Spectroscopic observations of Justitia in visible and near-infrared wavelengths of light indicate it has a very red color with a featureless spectrum lacking absorption bands between 0.5–2.5 μm wavelengths, which is unusual for a main-belt asteroid. Very few asteroids are known to exhibit this very red color, with 203 Pompeja and 732 Tjilaki as examples from the main asteroid belt.

Early attempts at categorizing Justitia's visible color and spectrum were unable to find a suitable asteroid taxonomic class; the Bus–DeMeo classification scheme classifies Justitia as a D-type asteroid whereas the Small Main-belt Asteroid Spectroscopic Survey, Phase II (SMASSII) classification scheme classifies it as an Ld-type asteroid. In 2022, a team of astronomers led by Max Mahlke proposed a new Z-type classification within which Justitia alongside a few other very red asteroids would belong to. Mahlke et al.'s Z-type asteroids are similar to D-type asteroids, but are distinguished by their strong spectrally red colors and distinct orbital characteristics. Despite the new classification, Justitia and Pompeja still stand out as the reddest members of Mahlke et al.'s Z-type asteroids and are the reddest main-belt asteroids known.

The very red colors and spectra of Justitia and Pompeja most closely resemble those of centaurs and trans-Neptunian objects (TNOs) from the outer Solar System, whose surfaces are composed of volatile ices (i.e. methanol and methane) and complex organic compounds (tholins). In particular, the spectra of the two asteroids resemble the IR (moderately red) and RR (very red) taxonomic classes for TNO spectra. A team of astronomers led by Sunao Hasegawa argued in 2021 that Justitia and Pompeja may have originated from the primordial Kuiper belt 20–30 AU away from the Sun before later migrating to the main asteroid belt—this would support the Nice model scenario. Hasegawa et al. interpreted the featureless spectra of Justitia and Pompeja as a lack of volatile ices in their surface layers, possibly caused by space weathering having broken down these surface volatile ices into tholins. Polarimetric observations of Justitia show that it exhibits light polarization properties similar to those of icy Solar System bodies and F-type asteroids. Observations by the NASA Infrared Telescope Facility in 2022 showed that Justitia's infrared spectrum at longer wavelengths resembles those of CM chondrites, with an absorption feature at 3.4 μm potentially attributed to aliphatic organic compounds.

The small eccentricity of Justitia's present-day orbit suggests that the asteroid did not experience inward gravitational scattering by Neptune during the planet's inward migration. Given Justitia's relatively small size, it should have experienced at least one catastrophic collision with another asteroid in the past. However, such collisions would have destroyed Justitia's red coloration, which suggests that either Justitia did not experience any destructive collisions or there may be an as-yet unknown mechanism that can retain the asteroid's red color even after a destructive collision.

== Mass and density ==
The mass and density of Justitia has not been measured and thus remains unknown. A realistic range of possible densities is 1–2 g/cm^{3}, which would correspond to a mass range of 7.9×10^{16} kg to 2.1×10^{17} kg. (Note: Parker et al. (2024) give GM values of 5.288×10^{−3} km^{3}/s^{2} and 14.146×10^{−3} km^{3}/s^{2} for the minimum and maximum densities of 1 and 2 g/cm^{3}, respectively. Converting the GM values to standard units of m^{3}/s^{2} and dividing by the gravitational constant G = 6.6743×10^{−11} m^{3}/(kg s^{2}) gives the mass M in units of kg: 7.9×10^{16} kg for 1 g/cm^{3} and 2.1×10^{17} kg for 2 g/cm^{3}.) Justitia's mass can be measured more accurately if an object such as a natural satellite or spacecraft is observed orbiting the asteroid. Occultation observations from August 2023 did not find any satellites or rings around Justitia.

== Exploration ==
Justitia is planned to be the seventh and final target of the United Arab Emirates Space Agency's MBR Explorer mission, which will enter orbit around the asteroid via rendezvous in October 2034 and then deliver a lander to its surface sometime in May 2035. The asteroid was selected for exploration by the MBR Explorer due to its low orbital inclination making it an accessible rendezvous target, as well as its very red spectrum which makes it a scientifically attractive target. The MBR Explorer's rendezvous with Justitia will provide a measurement of the asteroid's mass, which will facilitate the spacecraft's next stage of entering orbit around the asteroid. MBR Explorer is planned to enter a near-polar orbit around Justitia at an initial distance of 250 km (160 mi) for a duration of three weeks, before shrinking its orbital distance to 90–100 km (56–62 mi). During orbit, MBR Explorer will map Justitia's surface via imaging and will measure the asteroid's gravity field.

== See also ==
- 2015 RN35, a very red near-Earth asteroid with spectral type A or Z
