= 2015 RN35 =

Near-Earth asteroid

2015 RN_{35}
- 2015 RN_{35}'s radar echo, observed by the Goldstone Observatory in December 2022.

Discovery
- Discovered by: Pan-STARRS 1
- Discovery site: Haleakalā, United States
- Discovery date: 9 September 2015

Designations
- Minor planet category: NEO; Apollo

Orbital characteristics (JPL)
- Epoch 5 May 2025 (JD 2460800.5)
- Uncertainty parameter 0
- Observation arc: 2719 days
- Earliest precovery date: 9 September 2015
- Aphelion: 1.987 AU
- Perihelion: 0.962 AU
- Semi-major axis: 1.4746 AU
- Eccentricity: 0.3475
- Orbital period (sidereal): 1.791 yr (654.028 days)
- Mean anomaly: 131.416°
- Mean motion: 1.7906° per day
- Inclination: 0.2343°
- Longitude of ascending node: 148.005°
- Time of perihelion: 8 September 2024 (UTC)
- Argument of perihelion: 269.669°
- Earth MOID: 0.00351 AU (525,000 km; 1.37 LD)
- Jupiter MOID: 3.3734 AU

Physical characteristics
- Mean diameter: 41±8 m
- Synodic rotation period: 0.31936±0.00008 h or; 0.24889±0.000003 h
- Spectral type: A-type or Z-type
- Absolute magnitude (H): 23.24 (JPL); 23.9±0.2 (Beniyama et al.)

2015 RN_{35} is a small, unusually spectrally red asteroid estimated to be around 41 metres (135 ft) in size. Its orbit crosses Earth's, and is therefore classified as an Apollo asteroid and a near-Earth object (NEO). It was discovered on 9 September 2015 by the Pan-STARRS survey at the Haleakalā Observatory in Hawaii, United States, during one of its close encounters with Earth.

== Discovery and observations ==
2015 RN_{35} was discovered on 9 September 2015 by the Pan-STARRS 1 telescope as the asteroid passed within 0.1907 astronomical units (AU) from Earth. Further observations were conducted to establish and refine the asteroid's orbit. These observations extended to March 2016, and once again in March 2018 As of 2025, it has not yet been numbered or named by the Minor Planet Center.

2015 RN_{35} passed within 0.0046 AU (690,000 km) from Earth on 15 December 2022. This encounter permitted the Goldstone Observatory, alongside the Australia-based Canberra Deep Space Communication Complex and Australia Telescope Compact Array, to conduct radar imaging of the asteroid.

== Orbit ==
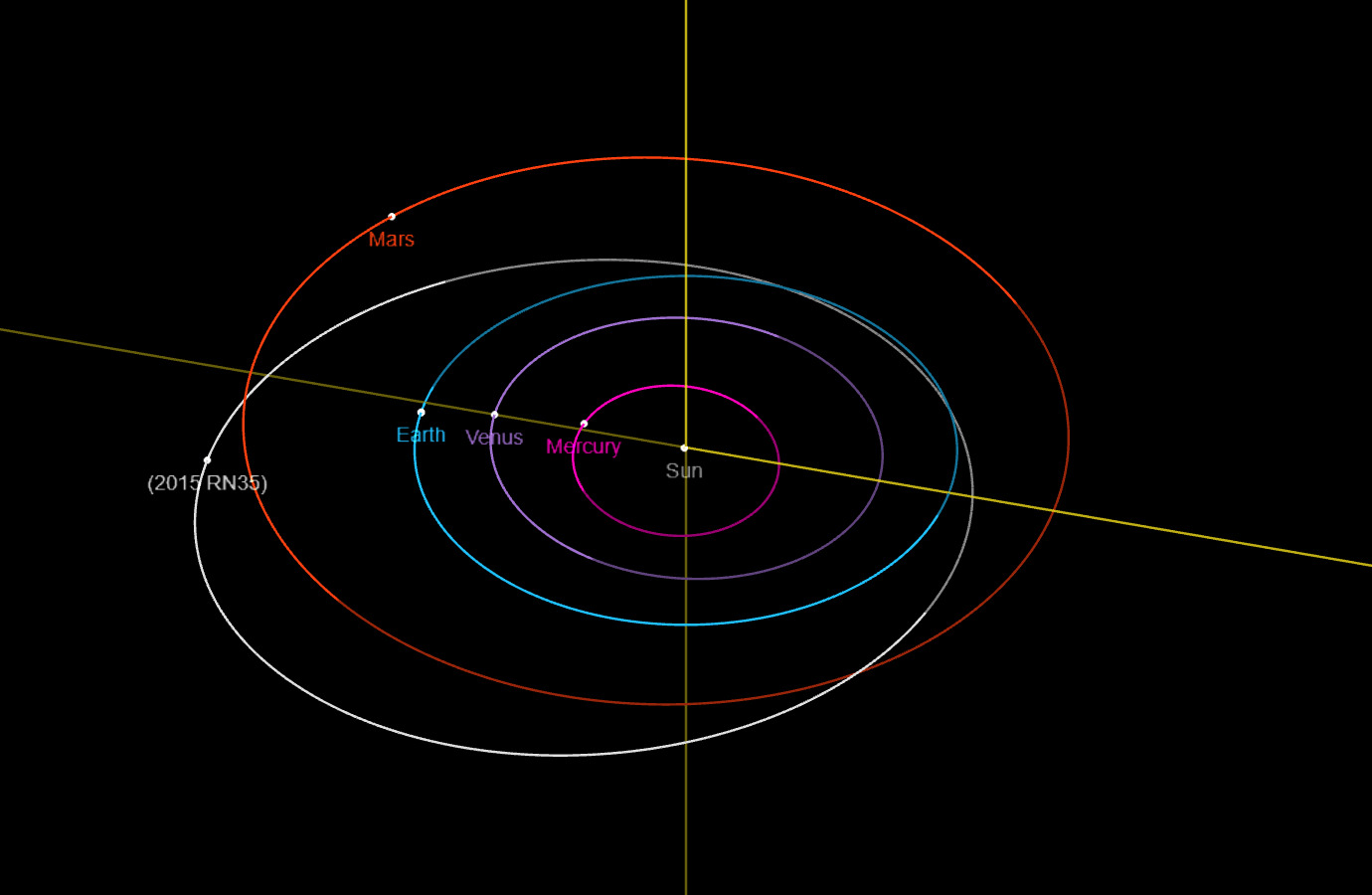
A diagram of 2015 RN_{35}'s orbit, with the orbits of the inner planets shown. Yellow lines are the axes of the ecliptic plane.

2015 RN_{35} is classified as a near-Earth object (NEO) and an Apollo asteroid (as its orbit crosses the Earth's). It has an orbital period of around 1.791 Earth years. Its orbit is moderately elliptical, with an orbital eccentricity of 0.3475. It has a semi-major axis of 1.4746 AU, with its distance from the Sun varying from 0.962 AU at perihelion to 1.987 AU at aphelion. Its orbital inclination with respect to the ecliptic plane (the orbital plane of the Earth around the Sun) is very small, at 0.2343°.

== Physical characteristics ==
The size of 2015 RN_{35} has not been directly measured, but it can be estimated from its brightness (absolute magnitude) and how reflective its surface is (geometric albedo). Using an absolute magnitude value of 23.9±0.2 and assuming 2015 RN_{35}'s geometric albedo is 0.28±0.10, 2015 RN_{35}'s estimated diameter is 41 ± 8 m (135 ± 26 ft).

During the December 2022 close encounter, 2015 RN_{35}'s lightcurve data was taken. Using the observed data, several teams of astronomers calculated its rotation period from fluctuations in the asteroid's observed brightness. Initial calculations gave a period of about 0.32 hours (19 min), with irregularities in its lightcurve possibly indicating chaotic rotation. Later analysis in a 2023 study led by Jin Beniyama revealed an additional, shorter 0.25-hour (15 min) long period in 2015 RN_{35}'s lightcurve. The presence of both suggests precession, though which period corresponds to the rotation period and precession period remains unclear.

Unusually, 2015 RN_{35}'s visible spectrum suggests that it is strongly red. It is nearly as red as the visible spectrum of 269 Justitia, a similarly extremely red object located in the main asteroid belt. 2015 RN_{35}'s spectrum also agrees well with that of rare A-type asteroids and Z-type asteroids, the latter classification having been recently proposed in a 2022 study led by Max Mahlke.

== Exploration ==
2015 RN_{35} serves as a potential target for a future spacecraft mission due to its proximity and unusual spectral properties. For a launch window between 2030 and 2035, a mission would need a delta-v budget of 11.801 km/s. 2015 RN_{35} is on NASA's automated Near-Earth Object Human Space Flight Accessible Targets Study (NHATS) list of mission-accessible target asteroids.

== See also ==
- 203 Pompeja – Another very red main belt asteroid
