= Biberman =

Biberman is a surname. Notable people with the surname include:

- Abner Biberman (1909–1977), American actor, director, and screenwriter
- Edward Biberman (1904–1986), American artist
- Herbert Biberman (1900–1971), American screenwriter and film director
- Leonid Biberman (1915–1998), Soviet and Russian physicist
