= Ametistov =

Ametistov, feminine: Ametistova is an artificial Russian surname originated in clergy, derived from the gemstone amethyst. Notable people with the surname include:

- Ernest Ametistov, Russian lawyer, judge of the Constitutional Court of the Russian Federation in 1991–1998. One of the founders of the Memorial Society and a member of the Moscow Helsinki Group
- Evgeni Ametistov, Russian physicist
- Tikhon Ametistov (1884–1941), Russian military commander, public and church figure
