= Sarah Al Amiri =

Emirati scientist and minister

- سارة بنت يوسف الأميري
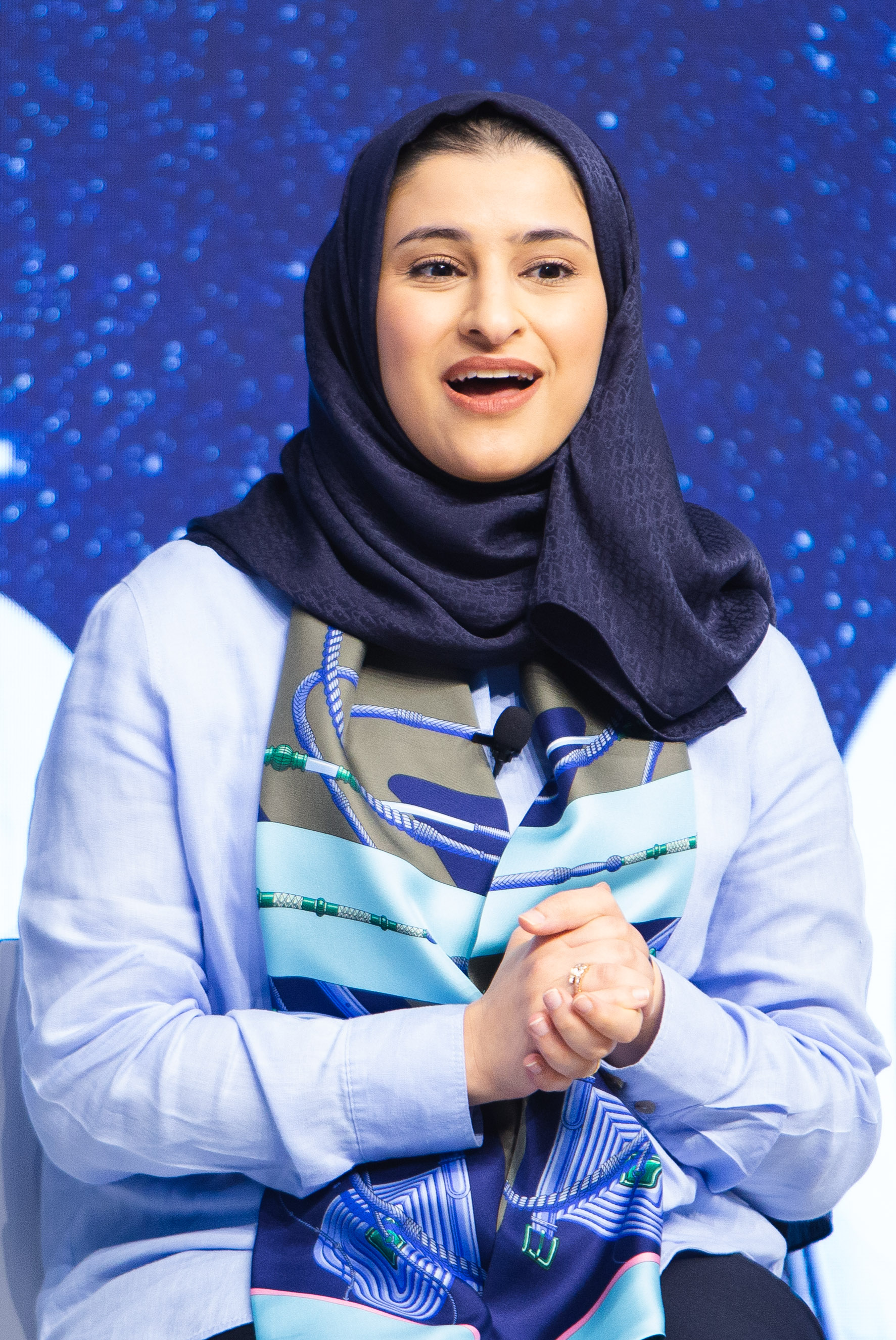
- Al Amiri in 2019

Minister of Education
- Incumbent
- Assumed office 14 July 2024
- Prime Minister: Mohammed bin Rashid
- Preceded by: Ahmad Belhoul Al Falasi (May 22- July 2024)

Personal details
- Born: 1987 (age 38–39) United Arab Emirates
- Education: American University of Sharjah

Sarah bint Yousef Al Amiri (Arabic: سارة بنت يوسف الأميري, born 1987) is the Minister of Education of United Arab Emirates. She is the former Minister of State for Advanced Technology within the Ministry of Industry and Advanced Technology, and former Chair of the Board of Directors of the Emirates Schools Establishment. Al Amiri is also the chair of the UAE Space Agency and the United Arab Emirates Council of Scientists, and Deputy Project Manager of the Emirates Mars Mission.

== Early life and education ==
Al Amiri was born in the United Arab Emirates in 1987. She grew up in Abu Dhabi. She studied computer science at the American University of Sharjah, earning bachelor's and master's degrees. She was always interested in aerospace engineering but grew up at a time when United Arab Emirates did not have a space program.

== Research and career ==
Al Amiri began her career at the Emirates Institution for Advanced Science and Technology, where she worked on DubaiSat-1 and DubaiSat-2. In 2018 she was appointed the chairwoman of the UAE Council for the Fourth Industrial Revolution and in 2016 the head of the Emirates Scientist Council.

She is the science lead for the Emirates Mars Mission, Hope. The mission is partnered with University of Colorado Boulder, University of California, Berkeley and Arizona State University. She spoke at TEDxDubai Salon about the Hope Mars Mission.

In 2015, the World Economic Forum honoured her as one of its 50 Young Scientists for her contributions to science, technology and engineering World Economic Forum.

In October 2017, Amiri was named Minister of State for Advanced Sciences in the United Arab Emirates Cabinet. In an effort to increase global scientific collaboration, Al Amiri toured US scientific institutions in November 2017. She was on the list of the BBC's 100 Women (BBC) announced on 23 November 2020.

In November 2017, Amiri became the first Emirati to speak at an international TED event when she spoke about the Hope Mars Mission in Louisiana. The mission launched in July 2020 and reached Mars in February 2021 to coincide with the 50th anniversary of the United Arab Emirates.

In February 2021, she was also named in the 2021 Time 100 Next, an annual list of the next 100 most influential people. In May 2022, Sheikh Mohammed bin Rashid, UAE Vice President and Ruler of Dubai, appointed Al Amiri as Minister of State for Public Education and Future Technology and Chair of the Board of Directors of the Emirates Schools Establishment.

In 2021, Al Amiri was selected as a Bloomberg New Economy Catalyst. As part of the program, she attended the annual New Economy Forum held in Singapore, and the Bloomberg New Economy Catalyst Retreat that same year.

In March 2025, Al Amiri signed two Memoranda of Understanding with the Russian Ministry of Education and the "Talent and Success" educational foundation. These agreements focus on enhancing international collaboration in education, exchanging expertise in scientific research, and developing student talents.
