= Evgeni Ametistov =

Russian thermophysicist

Evgeni Viktorovich Ametistov
- Born: Evgeni Viktorovich Ametistov; Евгений Викторович Аметистов; 17 June 1940 (age 85); Krasnodar, USSR
- Occupations: Thermophysicist, Rector of Moscow Power Engineering Institute (MPEI) in 1990—2005

Evgeni Viktorovich Ametistov (Russian: Евгений Викторович Аметистов; born 17 June 1940, in Krasnodar) is a Russian Thermophysicist and Corresponding Member of the Russian Academy of Sciences (1997). He was the Rector of Moscow Power Engineering Institute (MPEI) in 1990–2005 and since 2006 he has been an Advisor to Rector of MPEI.

== Biography ==
Evgeni Viktorovich Ametistov was born in Krasnodar. In 1960 he graduated from Kuban State Agrarian University, and in 1965—from Moscow Power Engineering Institute, where he has been working since then: he was consistently a Post-graduate, Assistant, Assistant Professor and Professor.

In 1975, a new Department of cryogenic technology was established in MPEI (now it is called the Department of Low Temperatures) where the study of processes of boiling cryogenic liquids began under the leadership of Valentin Grigoriev. In early 1980s, Ametistov also started to study methods of obtaining systems of monodisperse particles and transport processes inside them. Evgeni Ametistov also took active part in this research; in 1985, Evgeni Ametistov, Valentin Grigoriev and Yury Pavlov were awarded the USSR State Prize in the field of science and technology.

In 1985 (when Grigoriev, who was then the Rector of MPEI and also the Head of Cryogenic Technology Department, was invited to work for CPSU Central Committee), Ametistov was appointed Head of the department and directed it until 2006 (in 2000 the Center for High Temperatures of MPEI was established on the basis of this department and Evgeni Ametistov also was appointed its scientific supervisor). In 1986-1990 he also worked as a Deputy Rector of MPEI on scientific work. In 1990 Ametisitov was elected as a new head of the Institute and held this position until 2005. Since 2006, he has been an Advisor to Rector of MPEI.

He is also the vice-president of International Energy Academy and author and co-author of more than 150 scientific publications.
