= Leonid Biberman =

- Born: Leonid Mikhailovich Biberman; 7 April 1915; Poti
- Died: 23 September 1998 (aged 83); Moscow
- Occupation: One of the founders of the Thermophysics school in USSR

Leonid Mikhailovich Biberman (Russian: Леонид Михайлович Биберман; 7 April 1915, Poti — 23 September 1998, Moscow) was a Soviet and Russian physicist and a Corresponding Member of the Russian Academy of Sciences (1991). He was one of the founders of the Thermophysics research school in the Soviet Union.

== Biography ==
Leonid Mikhailovich Biberman graduated from Moscow Power Engineering Institute (MPEI) in 1940, specializing in Electro-Vacuum technology. In January 1941 he entered the postgraduate course of Moscow Power Engineering Institute. His scientific advisor was Valentin Fabrikant.

He fought in Great Patriotic War from 1941 to 1945 in the rank of Technician-Lieutenant, and was the head of the workshop of a communications battalion.

In 1945, he was reinstated in the post-graduate course of Moscow Power Engineering Institute and began teaching part-time there at the Department of Physics. Since 1946, he had been a Consultant of the All-Union Electrotechnical Institute.

Candidate of Sciences (1946), Doctor of Science (1959).

In the second half of the 1950s, Leonid Biberman took on a complicated physicotechnical problem: the development of the theory of radiative heat transfer. In 1955–1957 Biberman managed to show in his papers that when a space vehicle moves through dense layers of the atmosphere, the shock wave radiation in front of the apparatus generates a significant, and at high velocities, the principal contribution to aerodynamic heating. The results of this research were used in calculations for the thermal insulation of Soviet space vehicles.

In 1966 he started working at Joint Institute for High Temperatures. He substantiated the establishment of a high-temperature research group, which became the basis of the Theoretical Division of the Institute of High Temperatures of the USSR Academy of Sciences. This scientific school was later named after him. He was a scientific advisor of more than 20 Doctors of Sciences.

He died on 23 September 1998 in Moscow and was buried at Vagankovo Cemetery.
