= United Arab Emirates Space Agency =

Government agency

- وكالة الإمارات للفضاء

Agency overview
- Abbreviation: UAESA
- Formed: 2014; 12 years ago
- Type: Space agency
- Jurisdiction: United Arab Emirates
- Headquarters: Abu Dhabi, United Arab Emirates
- Administrator: Ahmad Belhoul Al Falasi
- Website: space.gov.ae

The United Arab Emirates Space Agency (UAESA) (Arabic: وكالة الإمارات للفضاء translit: wikālat al-Imārāt l-lifaḍā') is the space agency of the United Arab Emirates government responsible for the development of the country's space industry. It was created in 2014 and is responsible for developing and regulating the space sector in the UAE.

The agency is in charge of the growth of the sector through partnerships, academic programmes and investments in R&D, commercial initiatives, and driving space science research and exploration. The law defined that the main headquarters of the Agency are to be in Abu Dhabi and have a branch in Dubai. The board of directors may establish branches or other offices within and outside the state.

== History ==
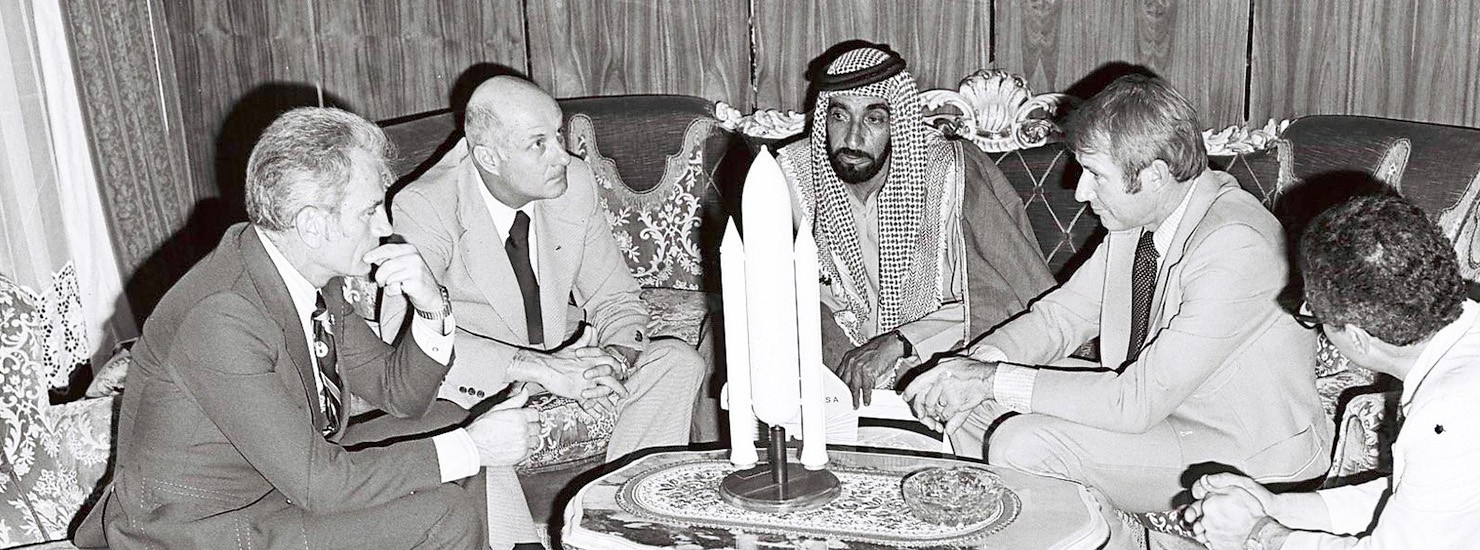
Sheikh Zayed bin Sultan Al Nahyan meeting with the NASA team responsible for the Apollo moon landing in the 1970s, sparking a national focus on space exploration.

The United Arab Emirates' interest in astronomy and space sciences dates back to the 1970s when Sheikh and president of the United Arab Emirates Zayed bin Sultan Al Nahyan met with the NASA team responsible for the Apollo moon landing. This encounter sparked a national focus on space, eventually leading to the birth of a national space sector with the establishment of Thuraya Telecommunications Company in 1997 and Al Yah Satellite Communications (Yahsat) in 2007.

In February 2006, Mohammed bin Rashid Al Maktoum, vice president and prime minister of the UAE, launched the Emirates Institution for Advanced Science and Technology, aiming to promote space science and scientific research in the UAE. In April 2015, it was merged with the Mohammed bin Rashid Space Centre.

The UAE Space Agency was established by federal decree in 2014 with the goal of developing the national space sector. The agency is responsible for establishing partnerships, assisting academic programs, advancing national and regional space exploration, and investing in research, development, and commercial space projects.

The UAE uses advanced technology in satellite communications services, with satellites in orbit specializing in various applications: mobile communications, satellite photography, television broadcasting, Internet, communications, radio, and military purposes.

The space sector is one of the strategic areas outlined by the Higher Policy for Science, Technology, and Innovation. It focuses on the exploration of celestial bodies, the development of communication and satellite technology, and the application of the latest space technologies for terrestrial uses.

In August 2024 the UAE launched its first SAR satellite.

On 4 January 2025, the UAE entered a new space partnership to send its first Emirati astronaut to orbit the Moon. Sheikh Mohammed bin Rashid Al Maktoum, along with Sheikh Hamdan and Sheikh Mansour, witnessed the Mohammed Bin Rashid Space Centre (MBRSC) signing an agreement to participate in the Lunar Gateway project, which will serve as humanity's first space station around the Moon.

== Budget ==
The space agency has gathered about 5.2 billion dollars of funding from government, private, and semi-private entities.

== UAE Space Agency initiatives ==
Animation of Emirates Mars Mission

Around Sun

Around Mars

Emirates Mars Mission · Sun · Earth · Mars

The Agency is involved in directing, investing in, and promoting a number of initiatives. The UAE has launched prior to the existence of the Agency commercial satellites constructed by EADS (YahSat 1A and 1B), Boeing (Thuraya 1, 2 and 3) and MBRSC DubaiSat-1 and DubaiSat-2, developed as part of a technology transfer programme with South Korea's Satrec Initiative, resulting in an existing space sector investment of some $5.5 billion.

=== Space Science Research Centre, Al-Ain ===
The $27 million Al-Ain based Space Research Centre was announced on 25 May 2015. The centre is intended as an incubator for space research, development, and innovation. It will be involved in coordinating with a number of agencies, including the Emirates Mobile Observatory.

=== Emirates Mars Mission ===
The Emirates Mars Mission is being undertaken by the Mohammed bin Rashid Space Centre, a Government of Dubai entity. The UAE successfully launched the Mars Hope mission to Mars on 19 July 2020. Mission goals include creating the first holistic diurnal picture of Mars' atmosphere with three science instruments mounted on an orbiter which is aimed to reach Mars orbit in early 2021. On 9 February 2021, it successfully put its probe into orbit around Mars. The Centre employs 75 people which the UAE government hopes to double by 2022.

The Mohammed Bin Rashid Space Centre announced on June 25, 2024, they successfully completed phase 2 of the Mars mission. The announcement came after a 45-day simulated Mars journey at US Space Agency NASA. During that time Dr Al Romaithi conducts 18 scientific experiments under UAE Analog Programme.

=== Emirates Lunar Mission ===
On 29 September 2020, Dubai's ruler, Sheikh Mohammed bin Rashid Al Maktoum announced the UAE's uncrewed mission to the Moon in 2024, as the country was seeking to expand its space sector. Sheikh Mohammed also said that the rover named "Rashid", after his father who is credited with modernizing Dubai, will cover "areas not yet reached in previous exploration missions". On 14 April 2021, MBRSC announced that the schedule had been moved up to send the rover to the Moon by 2022, rather than 2024. On 25 April 2023, seconds before an attempted landing, communication with the lander was lost. The ispace team confirmed that the spacecraft had crashed into the Moon and was thus destroyed.

=== Graduate degree programme in Advanced Space Science ===
In May 2015, an MoU was signed by Al Yah Satellite Communications Company (Yahsat), the Masdar Institute of Science and Technology and Orbital ATK Inc to create a Degree Programme in Advanced Space Science, the first such course of study in the Middle East. These three entities, with co-ordination and oversight from the UAE Space Agency, will launch the academic programme at Masdar Institute.

=== The Emirates Mission to the Asteroid Belt ===
In May 2023, UAESA announced a mission to the asteroid belt, that is planned to be launched in 2028. It will flyby the asteroids 10253 Westerwald, 623 Chimaera, 13294 Rockox, 88055 Ghaf, 23871 Ousha, and 59980 Moza. It will then orbit and deliver a landing craft to the unusually red asteroid 269 Justitia in 2034. The spacecraft aims to study the asteroids to study their origins and the potential for asteroid mining.

== See also ==
- Sarah Al Amiri
- List of government space agencies
