= 203 Pompeja =

Red main-belt asteroid

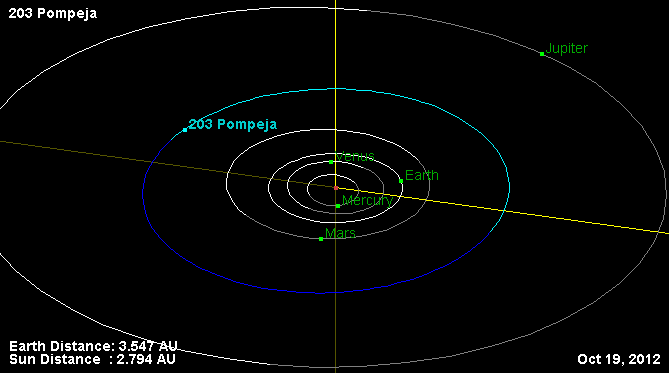
- Orbital diagram

Discovery
- Discovered by: C. H. F. Peters
- Discovery date: 25 September 1879

Designations
- Pronunciation: /pɒmˈpiːə/
- Named after: Pompeii
- Alternative designations: A879 SA, 1895 EA
- Minor planet category: Main belt

Orbital characteristics
- Epoch 31 July 2016 (JD 2457600.5)
- Uncertainty parameter 0
- Observation arc: 136.43 yr (49,832 d)
- Aphelion: 2.897 AU (433.4 Gm)
- Perihelion: 2.577 AU (385.5 Gm)
- Semi-major axis: 2.737 AU (409.4 Gm)
- Eccentricity: 0.058490
- Orbital period (sidereal): 4.53 yr (1,653.6 d)
- Average orbital speed: 18.01 km/s
- Mean anomaly: 47.6383°
- Mean motion: 0° 13^{m} 3.72^{s} / day
- Inclination: 3.1780°
- Longitude of ascending node: 347.916°
- Argument of perihelion: 57.060°

Physical characteristics
- Mean diameter: 124.592±1.079 km
- Mass: (1.251 ± 0.640/0.401)×10^{18} kg (8.54±0.90)×10^{17} kg (Note: Calculated from its standard gravitational parameter GM = 0.057±0.006 km^{3}/s^{2}.)
- Mean density: 1.626 ± 0.831/0.521 g/cm^{3} (Note: Assuming a diameter of 113.68 ± 6.55 km.); 0.84 g/cm^{3} (Note: Assuming a diameter of 125 km.)
- Synodic rotation period: 24.052 h (1.0022 d)
- Geometric albedo: 0.036±0.006
- Spectral type: DCX:
- Absolute magnitude (H): 8.97

203 Pompeja is a fairly large main-belt asteroid. It was discovered by C. H. F. Peters on September 25, 1879, in Clinton, New York, and named after Pompeii, the Roman town destroyed in a volcanic eruption in AD 79. This asteroid is orbiting the Sun at a distance of 2.74 AU with an eccentricity (ovalness) of 0.06 and a period of 4.53 yr. The orbital plane is tilted at an angle of 3.2° to the plane of the ecliptic.

Based upon photometric observations taken during 2011, it has a synodic rotation period of 24.052 ± 0.001 h, with a peak-to-peak amplitude of 0.10 ± 0.01 in magnitude. Because the rotation period nearly matches that of the Earth, it required coordinated observations from multiple observatories at widely spaced latitudes to produce a complete light curve. As discovered in 2021, Pompeja alongside the main-belt asteroid 269 Justitia have very red colors due to tholins on its surface, similar to trans-Neptunian objects. These asteroids are therefore thought to have formed in the outer Solar System despite their current orbits within the asteroid belt.
