= Emirates Mars Mission =

Space exploration probe mission to Mars

- A 3D rendering of the Hope spacecraft
- Names: Hope probe
- Operator: Mohammed bin Rashid Space Centre
- COSPAR ID: 2020-047A
- SATCAT no.: 45918
- Website: emiratesmarsmission.ae
- Mission duration: 2107 days and 20 hours (since orbital insertion); 2 years (planned)

Spacecraft properties
- Spacecraft: Hope (Arabic: الأمل, Al-Amal)
- Manufacturer: MBRSC; Partners: LASP (CU Boulder); UC Berkeley; ASU
- Launch mass: 1350 kg, including 800 kg hydrazine fuel
- Dry mass: 550 kg
- Dimensions: 2.37 m × 2.90 m
- Power: 1800 watts from two solar panels

Start of mission
- Launch date: 20 July 2020, 21:58:14 UTC
- Rocket: H-IIA
- Launch site: Tanegashima, LP-1
- Contractor: Mitsubishi Heavy Industries

Orbital parameters
- Periareon altitude: 20,000 km (12,000 mi)
- Apoareon altitude: 43,000 km (27,000 mi)
- Inclination: Supersynchronous orbit
- Period: 55 hours

Mars orbiter
- Orbital insertion: 9 February 2021, 15:30 UTC

Instruments
- EXI (Emirates eXploration Imager) EMIRS (Emirates Mars InfraRed Spectrometer) EMUS (Emirates Mars Ultraviolet Spectrometer)
- Hope Mars mission logo Emirates Planetary Programme

The Emirates Mars Mission (Arabic: مشروع الإمارات لاستكشاف المريخ, romanized: mašrū' al-Imārāt l-āstikšāf al-Murīkh) is a United Arab Emirates Space Agency uncrewed space exploration mission to Mars. The Hope probe (Arabic: مسبار الأمل, Misbar Al-Amal) was launched on 20 July 2020, and went into orbit around Mars on 9 February 2021.

The project was headed by Omran Sharaf. 200 Emirati scientists and engineers from the UAE and partner institutes were involved in the project. The mission design, development, and operations are led by the Mohammed bin Rashid Space Centre (MBRSC). The spacecraft was assembled in the United States at the University of Colorado Boulder's Laboratory for Atmospheric and Space Physics (LASP) by the Emirati engineers, assisted by their American counterparts, with support from Arizona State University (ASU) and the University of California, Berkeley. The project was led by MBRSC at every stage.

The space probe will study daily and seasonal weather cycles, weather events in the lower atmosphere such as dust storms, and how the weather varies in different regions of the planet. It will also add to knowledge about Mars atmospheric hydrogen and oxygen loss and other possible reasons behind the planet's drastic climate changes. The mission is being carried out by a team of Emirati engineers in collaboration with foreign research institutions, and is a contribution towards a knowledge-based economy in the UAE.

Hope was the first of three space missions sent toward Mars during the July 2020 Mars launch window, with missions also launched by the national space agencies of China (Tianwen-1 orbiter, deployable and remote cameras, lander and Zhurong rover) and the United States (Mars 2020 and its Perseverance rover and Ingenuity helicopter drone). The spacecraft was launched from the Tanegashima Space Center in Japan with a Japanese rocket, the Mitsubishi Heavy Industries H-IIA launch vehicle. All three arrived at Mars in February 2021. The Emirates Mars Mission was the first of the three to arrive at Mars, performing a successful orbit entry maneuver on 9 February 2021.

On 9 February 2021, the United Arab Emirates became the first Arab country and the fifth country to reach Mars and the second country to successfully enter Mars's orbit on its first try after India. In April 2023, The New York Times reported an updated global map of Mars based on images from the Hope spacecraft.

== Overview ==
The idea for a UAE mission to Mars came from a UAE cabinet retreat at the end of 2013. The mission was announced by Sheikh Khalifa bin Zayed Al Nahyan, the President of the United Arab Emirates, in July 2014, and is aimed at enriching the capabilities of Emirati engineers and increasing human knowledge about the Martian atmosphere.

The spacecraft is a Mars orbiter for studying the Martian atmosphere and climate. It was built by a joint Laboratory for Atmospheric and Space Physics (LASP)/Mohammed bin Rashid Space Centre (MBRSC) team at the University of Colorado Boulder with support from Arizona State University (ASU) and the University of California, Berkeley. The Hope probe was launched from Japan by a Japanese H-IIA launch vehicle, built and operated by Mitsubishi Heavy Industries (MHI) on 19 July 2020 and arrived at Mars on 9 February 2021. It became the first mission to Mars by any West Asian, Arab or Muslim-majority country. The UAE Space Agency (UAESA) and the Indian Space Research Organization set up a joint working group to assist UAESA in the Emirates Mars Mission.

To accomplish the objectives of the Emirates Mars Mission, an agreement was signed between the United Arab Emirates Space Agency (UAESA) and MBRSC, under a directive given by Sheikh Mohammed bin Rashid Al Maktoum, Vice President and Prime Minister of the UAE and Ruler of Dubai. As per the agreement, the Emirates Mars Mission will be funded by the UAE Space Agency and it will also supervise the complete execution process for the Hope probe. The agreement outlines the financial and legal framework along with assigning a timeline for the entire project. Under the agreement, MBRSC has been commissioned to design and manufacture the Hope probe.

The mission deputy project manager and science lead, Sarah Al Amiri, collaborated with LASP, UC Berkeley, and ASU to design and build the orbiter. The project manager is Omran Sharaf.

The name Hope (Arabic: al-Amal) was chosen because "it sends a message of optimism to millions of young Arabs", according to Sheikh Mohammed bin Rashid Al Maktoum. The resulting mission data will be shared freely with more than 200 institutions worldwide.

The Hope probe is cuboid in shape and structure, with a mass of 1,350 kg (2,980 lb) including fuel. The probe is 2.37 m (7 ft 9 in) wide and 2.90 m (9 ft 6 in) long, equivalent to a small car. Hope uses two 900 watts solar panels to charge its batteries, and it communicates with Earth using a high-gain 1.5 m (4 ft 11 in) – wide dish antenna. The spacecraft is equipped with star tracker sensors which help determine its position in space by identifying the constellations in relation to the Sun. Six 120-N thrusters control the speed of the probe, and eight 5 N (1.1 lb_{f}) reaction control system (RCS) thrusters are responsible for delicate maneuvers.

Animation of Emirates Mars Mission

Around Sun

Around Mars

Emirates Mars Mission · Sun · Earth · Mars

The travel time of the Hope probe was about 200 days on its journey of 493×10^{6} km (306×10^{6} mi). Upon arrival, it entered an initial 40-hour orbit, from which it will perform a periapsis raising maneuver to enter a final orbit of 55 hour period (slightly over 2 Martian days) and study the Martian atmosphere for two years while its instruments help build holistic models of it. The data are expected to provide additional data on the escape of the atmosphere to outer space. The Hope probe will carry three scientific instruments to study the Martian atmosphere, which include a digital camera for high resolution coloured images, an infrared spectrometer which will examine the temperature profile, ice, water vapor in the atmosphere, and an ultraviolet spectrometer which will study the upper atmosphere and traces of oxygen and hydrogen further out into space.

The mission is regarded as an investment in the UAE's economy and human capital. Sheikh Mohammed bin Rashid Al Maktoum mentioned three messages when he announced the mission: "The first message is for the world: that Arab civilisation once played a great role in contributing to human knowledge, and will play that role again; the second message is to our Arab brethren: that nothing is impossible, and that we can compete with the greatest of nations in the race for knowledge and the third message is for those who strive to reach the highest of peaks: set no limits to your ambitions, and you can reach even to space". The mission is timed to arrive at Mars before the fiftieth anniversary (2 December 2021) of the independence of the United Arab Emirates. According to the UAE's minister of cabinet affairs, Mohammad bin Abdullah Al Gergawi, the mission's cost was US$200 million.

A prototype of the Hope spacecraft was displayed at the Dubai Airshow in November 2017. The prototype is a model built to give a general idea of what the spacecraft will look like. Project manager Omran Sharaf said the mission is on track to launch in July 2020. The spacecraft was successfully launched on a Mitsubishi H-IIA rocket from the Tanegashima Space Center near Minamitane, Japan on 19 July 2020, at 21:58:14 UTC.

The 2021 International Astronautical Congress is to be held in October 2021 in Dubai, eight months after the Hope Mars Mission enters orbit around Mars. This meeting was originally planned for 2020, but the 2020 IAC was changed to an online format.

== Scientific objectives ==
To decide on its science objectives, the EMM team consulted the Mars Exploration Program Analysis Group, a NASA-led international forum that considers past and current Mars missions and identifies gaps in knowledge to tackle in future Mars missions. The EMM team selected a set of three instruments and a high supersynchronous orbit, to provide a global view of Mars's atmosphere. The EMM orbit has a periapse of about 20,000 km, an apoapse of about 43,000 km and a period of 55 hours. This orbit was selected with the goal of studying the atmosphere daily and through seasonal cycles, weather events in the lower atmosphere such as dust storms, and comparing weather at different geographic areas of Mars. According to the Hope Mars Mission team, the probe will be the "first true weather satellite" at Mars.

The Hope probe will study the atmospheric layers of Mars in detail and will provide data to study: the reason for a drastic climatic change in the Martian atmosphere from the time it could sustain liquid water to today, when the atmosphere is so thin water can exist only as ice or vapour, to help understand how and why Mars is losing its hydrogen and oxygen into space, and the connection between the upper and lower levels of the Martian atmosphere. Data from the Hope probe will also help model Earth's atmosphere and study its evolution over millions of years. All data gained from the mission will be made available to 200 universities and research institutes across the globe for the purpose of knowledge sharing.

In April 2023, The New York Times reported an updated global map of Mars based on images from the Hope spacecraft.

During a fly-by performed on 10 March 2023, the first-ever close-up global images of the Martian moon Deimos were released, taken by the Mars Hope orbiter.

== Hope spacecraft ==
The robotic probe sent to Mars under the Emirates Mars Mission has been named "Hope" or Al-Amal (Arabic: الأمل), as it is intended to send out a message of optimism to millions of Arabs across the globe and encourage them towards innovation. In April 2015, Sheikh Mohammed bin Rashid invited the Arab world to name the probe. The name was selected after thousands of suggestions were received, as it describes the core objective of the mission. The name of the probe was announced in May 2015 and since then the mission is sometimes referred to as the "Hope Mars Mission".

=== Construction and transfer ===
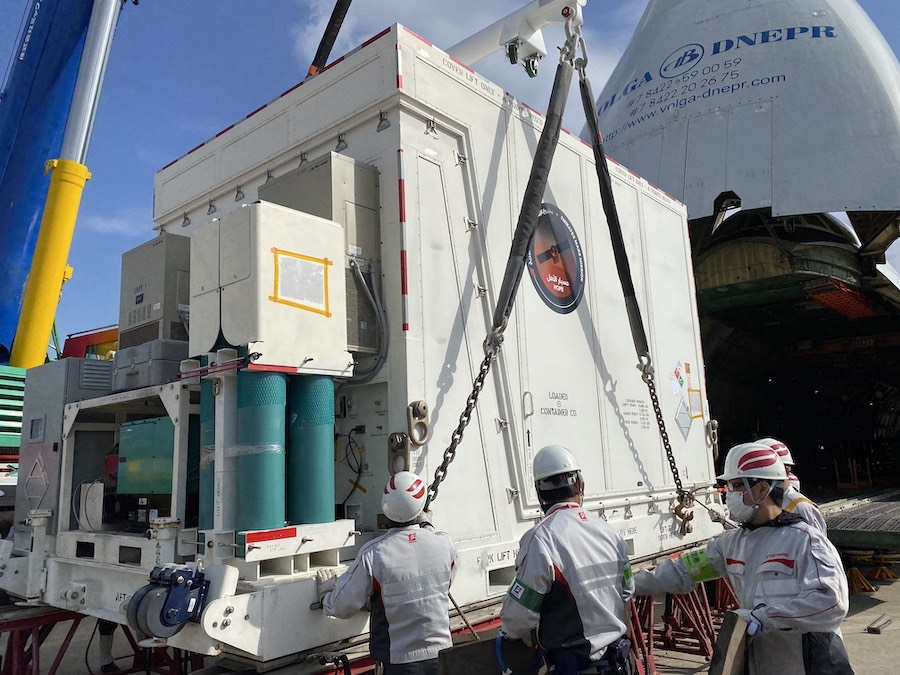
Hope arriving to the launch site in Japan after being shipped from MBRSC in Dubai.

The spacecraft was assembled at LASP in Boulder, Colorado, where Emirati engineers worked and learned from their American counterparts. It was launched from Tanegashima Space Center in Japan. The probe arrived at the launch site in Japan in April 2020, after officials navigated coronavirus-related quarantine protocols and travel restrictions. However, the coronavirus forced officials to shuffle the schedule, and mission managers decided to send the probe to Japan earlier. The decision to ship the spacecraft to the launch site forced engineers in Dubai to curtail some of the planned testings on the probe, but all critical checks were completed before the orbiter left for Japan in April 2020. The officials dispatched 11 engineers and technicians in early April to Japan, where they spent two weeks in quarantine to ensure they had no symptoms of the COVID-19 viral disease. On 20 April 2020, the Hope spacecraft left MBRSC in Dubai to begin the four-day journey to Tanegashima. Packaged inside a climate-controlled shipping container, the spacecraft was transported in a Russian-operated, Ukrainian-built Antonov An-124 cargo plane from Dubai to Nagoya, Japan. The final phase of the journey occurred aboard a ship, which carried the probe from Nagoya to Tanegashima Island on 24 April 2020. Six members of the Emirates Mars Mission team accompanied the spacecraft to Japan. Once there, they began their own two-week quarantine period as mandated by the Japanese government. When they complete the quarantine period, the personnel join the 11 engineers and technicians to complete final testing on the spacecraft inside a payload processing facility clean room at Tanegashima.

=== Specifications ===
The Hope probe is built from aluminium in a honeycomb structure with a composite face-sheet. With a mass of 1,350 kg (2,980 lb) including the propellant, the overall size and dimensions of the probe is comparable to a small car.

- Dimensions: 2.37 m (7 ft 9 in) in width and 2.90 m (9 ft 6 in) in length
- Mass: 1,350 kg (2,980 lb)
- Power: 1800 watts from two solar panels

For the purpose of communication, the probe uses a high-gain antenna 1.85 m (6 ft 1 in) in diameter. This antenna produces a narrow radio-wave that must point towards Earth. There are low-gain antennas in the structure of the probe for directional communication at lower bandwidth. Star trackers are used for position determination in space by studying the constellations in relation to the Sun. Hope is equipped with six 120 N (27 lbf) thrusters and eight 5 N (1.1 lbf) reaction control system (RCS) thrusters. The function of the six delta-v thrusters is velocity management, while the RCS thrusters are used for attitude control and delicate maneuvering. The reaction wheels within the probe allow it to reorient itself while traveling through space, helping it point its antenna towards Earth or point any scientific instrument towards Mars.

== Instruments ==
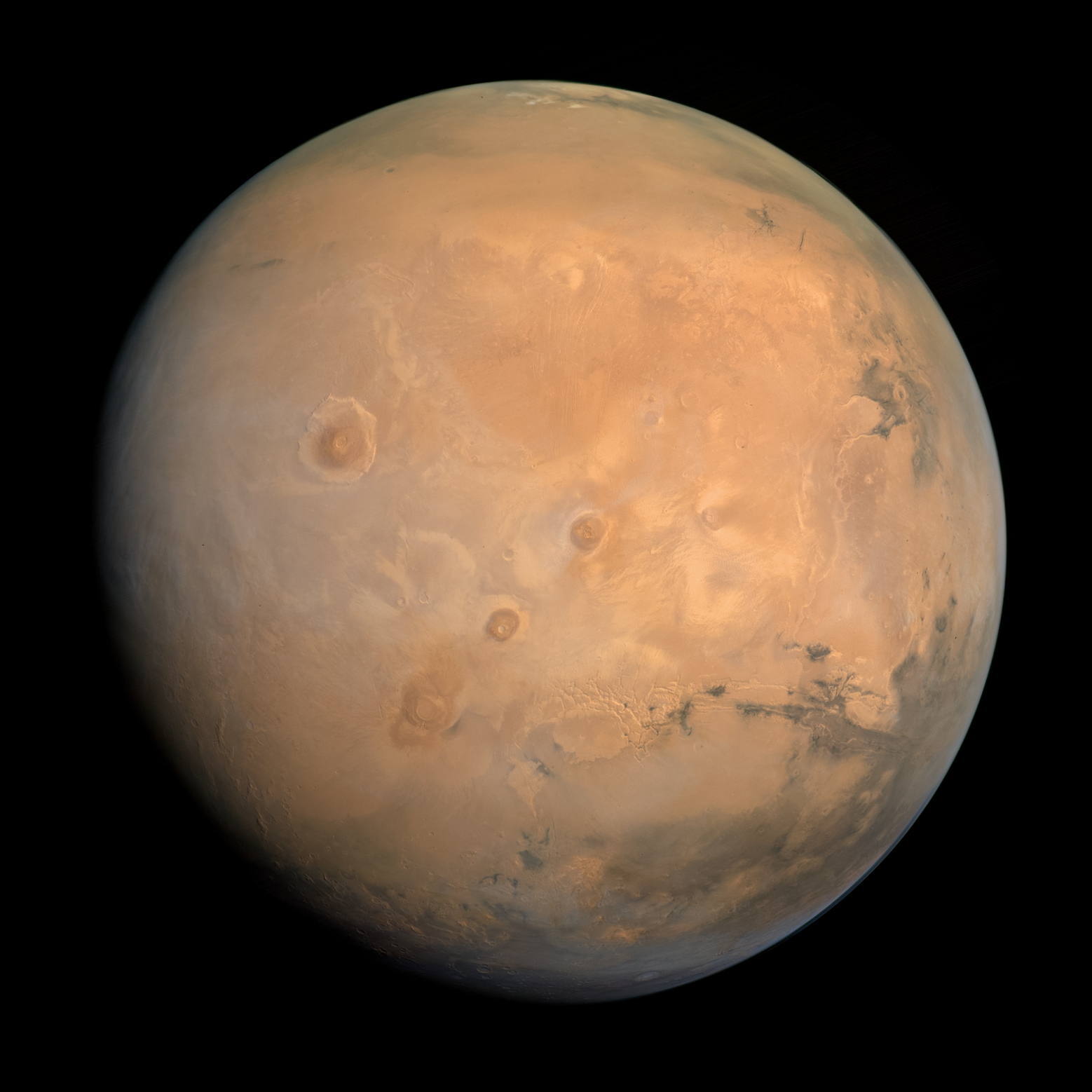
Photo of Mars taken by Hope

To achieve the scientific objectives of the mission, the Hope probe is equipped with three scientific instruments:

- Emirates eXploration Imager (EXI) is a multi-band camera capable of taking high-resolution images with a spatial resolution of better than 8 km. It uses a selector wheel mechanism consisting of six discrete bandpass filters to sample the optical spectral region: three UV bands and three visible (RGB) bands. EXI measures properties of water, ice, dust, aerosols, and abundance of ozone in Mars's atmosphere. The instrument was developed at LASP in collaboration with MBRSC.
- Emirates Mars Infrared Spectrometer (EMIRS) is an interferometric thermal infrared spectrometer developed by ASU, Northern Arizona University (NAU), and MBRSC. It measures the emitted radiance from surface and atmosphere, determining the surface temperature, atmospheric temperature profiles, along with ice, water vapor and dust abundances in the atmosphere. EMIRS will provide a view of the lower and middle atmosphere. Development was led by ASU with support from NAU and MBRSC.
- Emirates Mars Ultraviolet Spectrometer (EMUS) is a far-ultraviolet imaging spectrograph that measures emissions in the spectral range 100–170 nm to measure global characteristics and variability of the thermosphere, and hydrogen and oxygen coronae. Design and development was led by LASP.

== Launch ==
The rocket was launched during a brief launch window starting on 14 July 2020. The spacecraft was launched on 19 July 2020 from the Tanegashima Space Center in Japan using a Mitsubishi Heavy Industries H-IIA launch vehicle, and it arrived at Mars on 9 February 2021.

== Guidance and navigation ==
KinetX Aerospace, based in Tempe, Arizona, are providing navigation services for the mission. NASA's Deep Space Network (DSN) is being used to communicate with and track the spacecraft. KinetX uses the radio tracking data provided by the DSN to estimate the spacecraft's trajectory and design the maneuvers necessary to keep Hope on its planned trajectory and insert into Mars orbit.

== Mission design ==
Advanced Space, based in Boulder, Colorado, is providing mission design services for the mission. Advanced Space created the reference trajectory, reference maneuvers, and science events list. They also provide verification for all maneuvers as well as the launch targets.

== Team ==
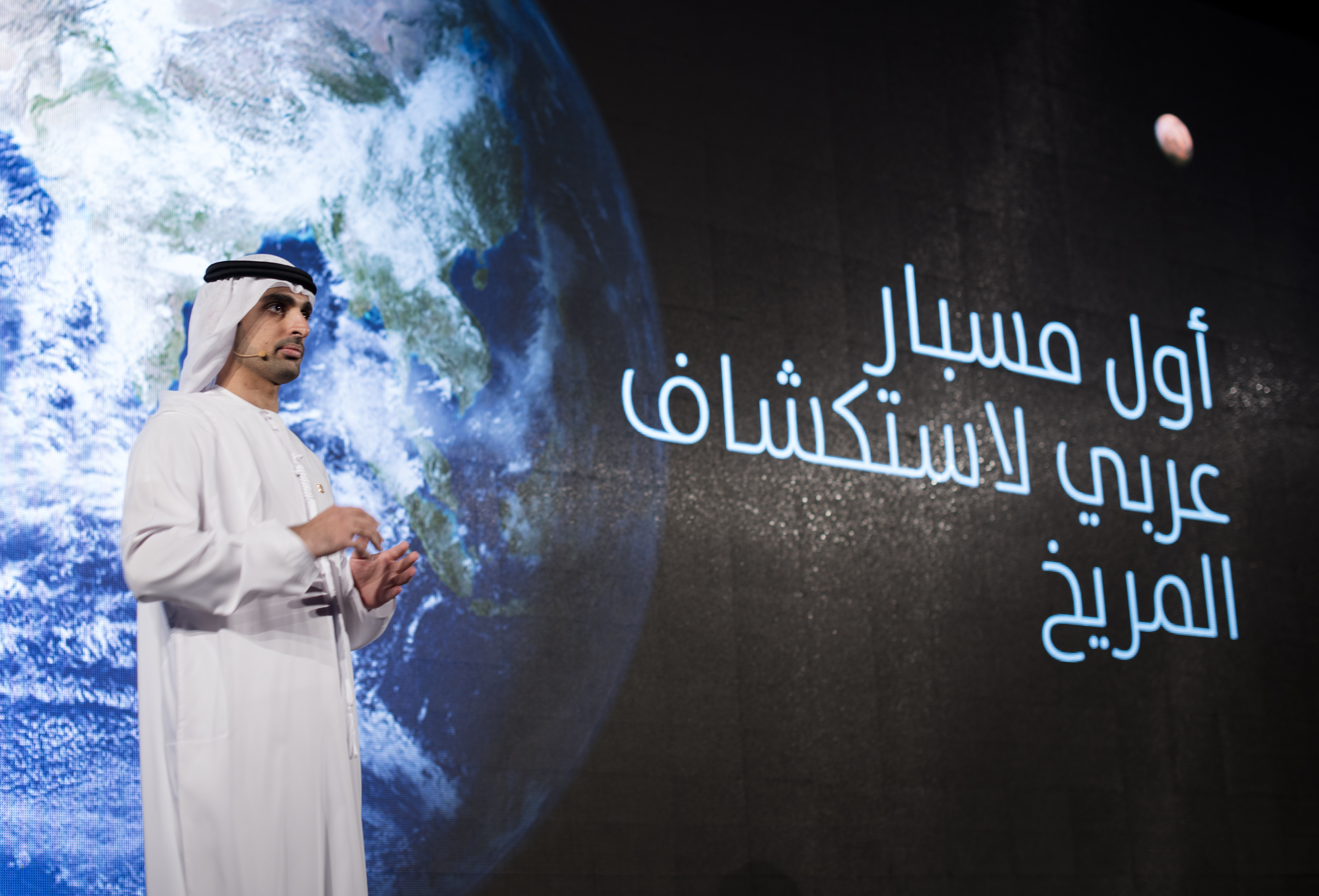
Omran Sharaf, mission project manager, announcing the mission in Dubai in 2015.

The mission team is divided into seven groups including Spacecraft, Logistics, Mission Operations, Project Management, Science Education and Outreach, Ground Station, and Launch Vehicle. The team is headed by Omran Sharaf, who acts as the project manager and is responsible for managing and supporting the ongoing tasks related to the Emirates Mars Mission.

Sarah Amiri is the deputy project manager and the lead science investigator, who leads the team in developing the mission's objectives and aligning programmes related to the instrumentation of the Hope probe. The mission has been referred to as having the potential to make a lasting contribution to the economy and people of the United Arab Emirates.

The mission team includes 150 Emirati engineers and 200 engineers and scientists at partner institutes in the United States, with Omran Sharaf as the project director; Pete Withnell as the program manager; Sarah Amiri, deputy program manager and the lead science investigator; Ibrahim Hamza Al Qasim, deputy project manager, strategic planning; and Zakareyya Al Shamsi, deputy project manager for the operations.

Indian Space Research Organisation (ISRO) held meetings with the mission team and shared their experience and assisted in their launch of the Mars mission.

== Trajectory corrections and arrival ==
The UAE's Hope Mars orbiter successfully executed its first interplanetary course correction maneuver (TCM1), mission officials announced 17 August 2020.

The orbiter arrived at Mars on 9 February 2021; around 19:42 Gulf Standard Time (UTC+04:00), the craft started firing its thrusters to insert itself into Mars's orbit, a process that took about 27 minutes of thrust burn to complete. The craft then entered radio silence as it swung around Mars, but reported it had successfully entered orbit about 15 minutes later.

== See also ==
- Exploration of Mars
- List of missions to Mars
