= 623 Chimaera =

Main-belt asteroid

Discovery
- Discovered by: K. Lohnert
- Discovery site: Heidelberg
- Discovery date: 22 January 1907

Designations
- Pronunciation: /kaɪˈmɪərə/ ky-MEER-ə
- Named after: Chimera
- Alternative designations: 1907 XJ

Orbital characteristics
- Epoch 31 July 2016 (JD 2457600.5)
- Uncertainty parameter 0
- Observation arc: 106.49 yr (38896 d)
- Aphelion: 2.7396 AU (409.84 Gm)
- Perihelion: 2.1819 AU (326.41 Gm)
- Semi-major axis: 2.4607 AU (368.12 Gm)
- Eccentricity: 0.11331
- Orbital period (sidereal): 3.86 yr (1409.9 d)
- Mean anomaly: 186.178°
- Mean motion: 0° 15^{m} 19.224^{s} / day
- Inclination: 14.127°
- Longitude of ascending node: 308.337°
- Argument of perihelion: 124.416°

Physical characteristics
- Mean radius: 22.045±0.5 km
- Synodic rotation period: 14.635 h (0.6098 d)
- Geometric albedo: 0.0372±0.002
- Absolute magnitude (H): 10.97

623 Chimaera is a minor planet, specifically an asteroid orbiting in the asteroid belt.

== Orbit and classification ==
The asteroid is the major body in the Chimaera Family. It is 22 kilometres in radius and orbits more in the inner to mid asteroid belt, taking 4 years to complete an orbit. Not much detail is known about the asteroid.

== Exploration ==
The MBR Explorer spacecraft is going to visit 623 Chimaera among six other asteroids under the Emirates Mission to the Asteroid Belt. The spacecraft is planned to launch in 2028. It will make observations of 623 Chimaera with its two cameras and two spectrometers with the goal of better understanding the formation of the Solar System.
