= 732 Tjilaki =

Main-belt asteroid

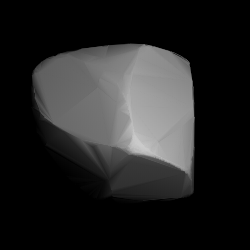
- Modelled shape of Tjilaki from its lightcurve

Discovery
- Discovered by: A. Massinger
- Discovery site: Heidelberg Obs.
- Discovery date: 15 April 1912

Designations
- Pronunciation: Malay: [tʃiˈlaki]
- Named after: Cilaki River (River in Indonesia)
- Alternative designations: A912 HK · 1958 FC; 1912 OR
- Minor planet category: main-belt · (inner); background

Orbital characteristics
- Epoch 31 May 2020 (JD 2459000.5)
- Uncertainty parameter 0
- Observation arc: 106.66 yr (38,959 d)
- Aphelion: 2.5633 AU
- Perihelion: 2.3490 AU
- Semi-major axis: 2.4561 AU
- Eccentricity: 0.0436
- Orbital period (sidereal): 3.85 yr (1,406 d)
- Mean anomaly: 359.80°
- Mean motion: 0° 15^{m} 21.96^{s} / day
- Inclination: 10.994°
- Longitude of ascending node: 173.35°
- Argument of perihelion: 64.900°

Physical characteristics
- Mean diameter: 29.791±0.431 km; 36.49±0.43 km; 37.61±1.6 km
- Synodic rotation period: 12.34±0.01 h
- Pole ecliptic latitude: (160.0°, 23.0°) (λ_{1}/β_{1}); (353.0°, 24.0°) (λ_{2}/β_{2})
- Geometric albedo: 0.0655±0.006; 0.070±0.002; 0.138±0.024
- Spectral type: D (S3OS2); D (polarimetric)
- Absolute magnitude (H): 10.40; 10.5; 10.70

732 Tjilaki (provisional designation A912 HK or 1912 OR) is a dark background asteroid, approximately 36 kilometers (22 miles) in diameter, located in the inner region of the asteroid belt. It was discovered by German astronomer Adam Massinger at the Heidelberg Observatory on 15 April 1912, and later named after the Cilaki (Tjilaki in pre-reform spelling) river in Indonesia. The dark D-type asteroid has a rotation period of 12.3 hours. It was an early candidate to be visited by the Rosetta spacecraft which eventually rendezvoused comet 67P/Churyumov–Gerasimenko.

== Orbit and classification ==
Tjilaki is a non-family asteroid of the main belt's background population when applying the hierarchical clustering method to its proper orbital elements. It orbits the Sun in the inner asteroid belt at a distance of 2.3–2.6 AU once every 3 years and 10 months (1,406 days; semi-major axis of 2.46 AU). Its orbit has an eccentricity of 0.04 and an inclination of 11° with respect to the ecliptic. The body's observation arc begins at Heidelberg Observatory on 28 August 1913, or 16 months after its official discovery observation.

== Naming ==
Tjilaki was named after the Cilaki (Tjilaki) river in West Java, Indonesia. The river rises in the mountains where the city of Malabar is located. The naming was mentioned in The Names of the Minor Planets by Paul Herget in 1955 (H 74).

== Rosetta mission ==
In the Phase A study of the Rosetta mission, Tjilaki was considered an alternative visiting target to comet 46P/Wirtanen. However, both candidates were later abandoned in favor of comet 67P/Churyumov–Gerasimenko, which was visited by Rosetta in 2014. The retargeting was necessary as the spacecraft's launch window changed due to a delay caused by the launch failure of the Hot Bird 7 satellite on the maiden flight of the Ariane 5 ECA carrier rocket in 2002.

== Physical characteristics ==
In both the Tholen- and SMASS-like taxonomic variants of the Small Solar System Objects Spectroscopic Survey (S3OS2), Tjilaki is a dark D-type asteroid, uncommon in the inner but abundant in the outer asteroid belt as well as among the Jupiter trojan population. Polarimetric observations also determined a D-type.

=== Rotation period and poles ===
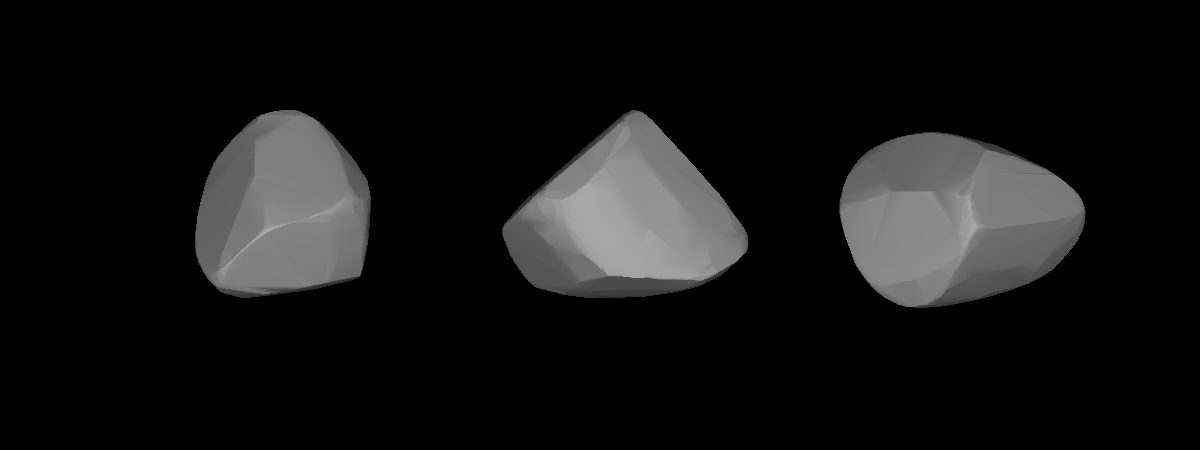
A three-dimensional model of 732 Tjilaki based on its light curve

In February 1996, a rotational lightcurve of Tjilaki was obtained from photometric observations over ten nights by European astronomers using the Dutch 0.9-metre Telescope and the Bochum 0.61-metre Telescope at La Silla Observatory in Chile. Lightcurve analysis gave a rotation period of 12.34±0.01 hours with a brightness variation of 0.19±0.02 magnitude (U=3−).

In May 2012, astronomers at the Palomar Transient Factory measured a period of 12.277±0.0048 hours (U=2). Additional observations were made by the TESS-team in January 2019, and by amateur astronomers Axel Martin and Rui Goncalves in May 2020, reporting a concurring period of (12.3286±0.0005) and (12.3216±0.00144) hours with an amplitude of (0.16±0.03) and (0.287±0.004) magnitude, respectively (U=2/n.a.).

In 2016, a modeled lightcurve gave a concurring sidereal period of 12.3411±0.0002 hours using data from the Uppsala Asteroid Photometric Catalogue, the Palomar Transient Factory survey, and individual observers, as well as sparse-in-time photometry from the NOFS, the Catalina Sky Survey, and the La Palma surveys (950). The study also determined two spin axes of (160.0°, 23.0°) and (353.0°, 24.0°) in ecliptic coordinates (λ, β).

=== Diameter and albedo ===
According to the surveys carried out by the NEOWISE mission of NASA's Wide-field Infrared Survey Explorer (WISE), the Japanese Akari satellite, and the Infrared Astronomical Satellite IRAS, Tjilaki measures (29.791±0.431), (36.49±0.43) and (37.61±1.6) kilometers in diameter and its surface has an albedo of (0.138±0.024), (0.070±0.002) and (0.0655±0.006), respectively. The Collaborative Asteroid Lightcurve Link derives an albedo of 0.0763 and a diameter of 37.69 kilometers based on an absolute magnitude of 10.53.

Alternative mean-diameters published by the WISE team include (36.76±11.57 km) and (37.96±9.94 km) with a corresponding albedo of (0.09±0.06) and (0.15±0.05). Two asteroid occultations on 20 June 2005 and on 28 July 2009, gave a best-fit ellipse dimension of (33.6 km × 33.6 km) and (37.7 km × 36.4 km), respectively, each with an intermediate quality rating of 2. These timed observations are taken when the asteroid passes in front of a distant star.
