= Thermophysics =

Geological application of thermodynamics

Thermophysics is the application of thermodynamics to geophysics and to planetary science more broadly. It may also be used to refer to the field of thermodynamic and transport properties.

== Remote sensing ==
Earth thermophysics is a branch of geophysics that uses the naturally occurring surface temperature as a function of the cyclical variation in solar radiation to characterise planetary material properties.

Thermophysical properties are characteristics that control the diurnal, seasonal, or climatic surface and subsurface temperature variations (or thermal curves) of a material. The most important thermophysical property is thermal inertia, which controls the amplitude of the thermal curve and albedo (or reflectivity), which controls the average temperature.

This field of observations and computer modeling was first applied to Mars due to the ideal atmospheric pressure for characterising granular materials based upon temperature. The Mariner 6, Mariner 7, and Mariner 9 spacecraft carried thermal infrared radiometers, and a global map of thermal inertia was produced from modeled surface temperatures collected by the Infrared Thermal Mapper Instruments (IRTM) on board the Viking 1 and 2 Orbiters.

The original thermophysical models were based upon the studies of lunar temperature variations. Further development of the models for Mars included surface-atmosphere energy transfer, atmospheric back-radiation, surface emissivity variations, CO_{2} frost and blocky surfaces, variability of atmospheric back-radiation, effects of a radiative-convective atmosphere, and single-point temperature observations.
