= Ottoman clothing =

Style and design of clothing worn by the Ottoman Turks

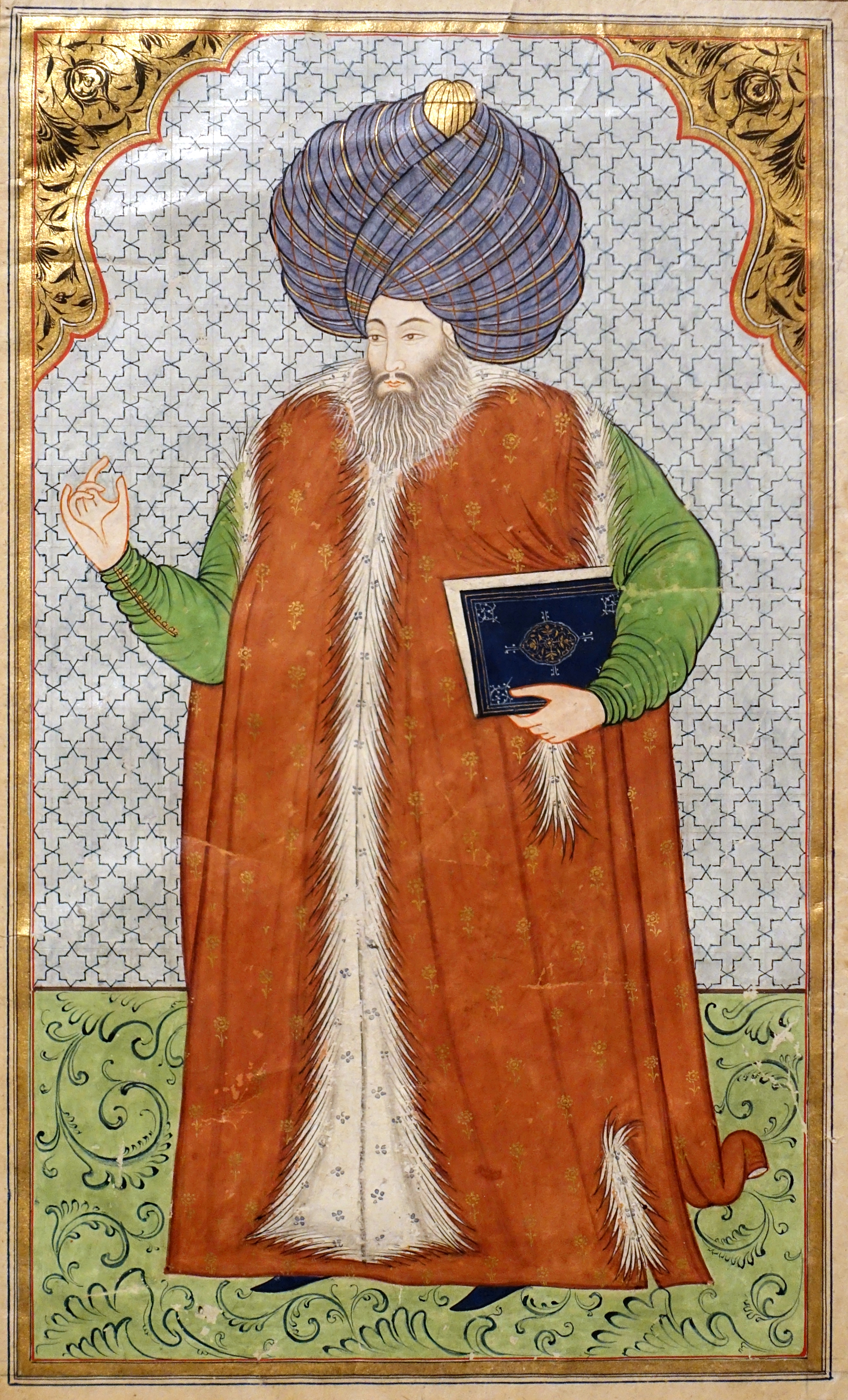
An Ottoman official c. 1650

Ottoman clothing or Ottoman fashion is the style and design of clothing worn during the Ottoman Empire. Fashion during the Ottoman Empire was a significant facet of the empire's cultural identity, serving as a marker of status, occupation, religion, and more.

Reflecting the diverse nature and broad reach of the Ottoman Empire, the attire of both men and women was influenced by a combination of many different traditional dresses.

== Ottoman period ==
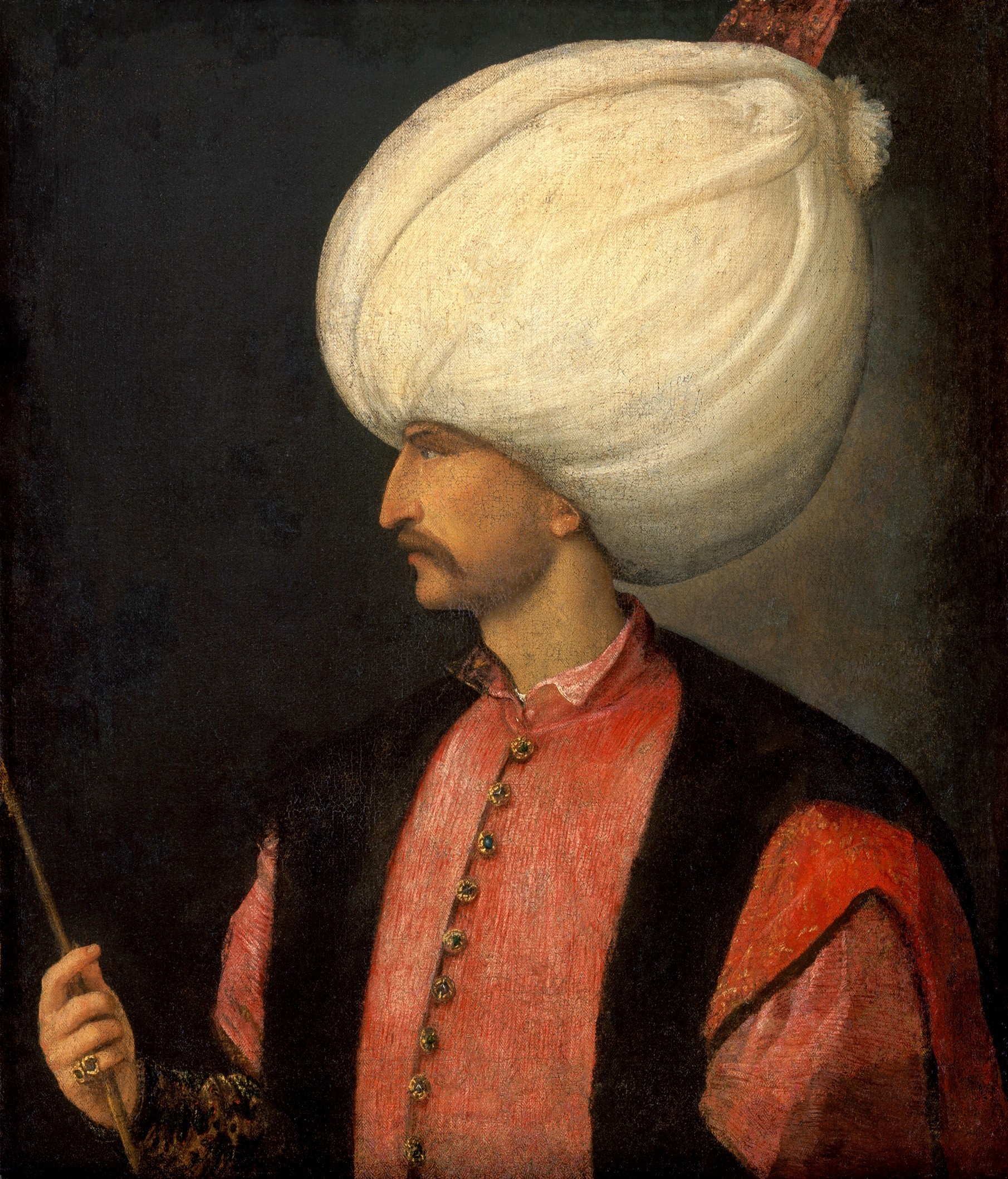
Ottoman Sultan Suleiman the Magnificent adorned in a richly embroidered kaftan

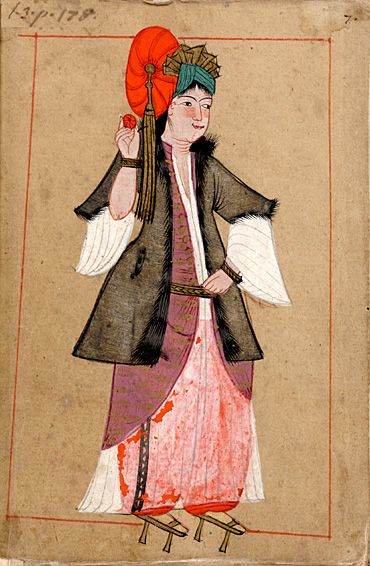
A stylish young woman of the mid-17th century. She wears şalvar (trousers), a long, sheer gömlek (chemise), and an ankle-length purple entari (outer robe) with the ends tucked up. The fur lining of her yelek (jacket or vest) marks her as wealthy and high-ranking.

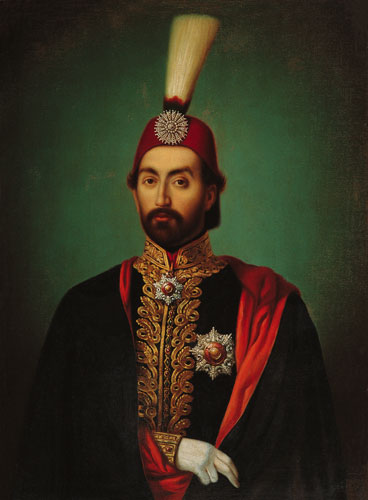
Abdülmecid I

While those of the palace and court dressed lavishly, common people were only concerned with covering themselves. Starting in the reign of Suleiman the Magnificent, administrators enacted sumptuary laws about the clothing of Muslims, Christians, Jewish communities, clergy, tradesmen, and state and military officials, particularly strictly enforced during the reign of Suleiman the Magnificent.

In this period men wore outer clothing like the 'mintan' (a vest or short jacket), 'zıbın', 'şalvar' (trousers), 'kuşak' (sash), 'potur', entari or kaftan (long robe), 'kalpak', 'sarık' on the head, and 'çarık', çizme (boots), 'çedik', or 'Yemeni' on the feet. The administrators and the wealthy wore caftans with fur lining and embroidery, whereas the middle class wore 'cübbe' (mid-length robe) or 'hırka' (a short robe or tunic). The poor wore collarless 'cepken' or 'yelek' (vest). One of the most significant reforms in Ottoman fashion took place during the reign of Mahmud II (1808–1839). The modernization attempts of Mahmud II first had their effects in the state sector. While the 'sarık' was replaced by the 'fez', people employed at the Sublime Porte began to wear trousers, 'setre' and 'potin'. Additionally, following the abolition of the janissaries in 1826, Mahmud mandated Westernized uniforms, in an attempt to modernize and distinguish the new armed forces from the old.

Women's everyday wear was şalvar (trousers), a gömlek (chemise) that came down to mid-calf or ankle, a short, fitted jacket called a zıbın, and a sash or belt tied at or just below the waist. For formal occasions, such as visiting friends, the woman added an entari or kaftan, a long robe that was cut like the zıbın apart from the length. Both zıbın and kaftan were buttoned to the waist, leaving the skirts open in front. Both garments also had buttons all the way to the throat but were often buttoned only to the underside of the bust, leaving the garments to gape open over the bust. All of these clothes could be brightly colored and patterned. However, when a woman left the house, she covered her clothes with a ferace, a dark, modestly cut robe that buttoned all the way to the throat. She also covered her hair and face with a pair of veils.

=== Tanzimat period ===
During the 'Tanzimat' and 'Meşrutiyet' period in the 19th century, common people still wearing traditional clothing presented a great contrast to the administrators and the wealthy wearing 'redingot', jacket, waistcoat, boyunbağı (tie), 'mintan', sharp-pointed and high-heeled shoes. Women's clothes of the Ottoman period in the 'mansions' and Palace courts included 'Entari', 'kuşak', 'şalvar', 'başörtü', and the 'ferace' of the 19th century without much change.

In the 16th century, women wore two-layer long 'entari' and 'tül', velvet shawls, on their heads. Their outdoor clothing consisted of 'ferace' and 'yeldirme'. The simplification in the 17th century was apparent in an inner 'entari' worn under a short-sleeved, caftan-shaped outfit and a matching belt.

Women's wear became more showy and extravagant, accompanied by adorned hair buns and tailoring. Tailoring in its real sense began in this period. The sense of women's wear primarily began in large residential centers such as Istanbul and İzmir in the 19th century and women gradually began to participate in social life, along with the Westernization movement. Pera became the center of fashion and Paris fashions were followed by tailors of Greek and Armenian origin. In the period of Abdul Hamid II, the 'ferace' (a concealing outer robe shaped like a modestly cut version of the indoor dress) was replaced by 'çarşaf' of different styles. However, the rural sector continued to wear traditional clothing.

=== Clothing legislation ===
Like many other early modern societies, the Ottoman Empire introduced a bevy of clothing laws meant to regulate social relations and status amongst various groups. Various types of clothing and headgear were strictly reserved for certain classes. These laws often emphasized modesty and social discipline. During the 17th century, however, political crises resulted in chaos in clothes. The excessively luxurious compulsion for consumption and showing off in the Tulip Era lasted until the 19th century. Luxury clothing became a point of contention during the rule of Selim III (1789-1807). Selim was highly critical of his courtiers and their aides dressing extravagantly, as well as tradesmen and commoners who outdressed their rank to try to imitate their noble superiors. In an attempt to regain the dwindling domestic authority and legitimacy of the sultanate, Selim demanded a return to the previous status quo.

=== Headwear ===
In particular, headgear played a central role in designating social status and position. In the 14th century, a son of Sultan Orhan reserved a particular headgear for himself. Similarly, certain colors of headgear were reserved for members of the Ottoman court, the Greeks, Franks, and other groups. In the 16th century, this informal system of headgear rankings was codified into law, with sultans, viziers, janissaries, and commoners each receiving their designated headgear type. Until 1829, headgear was the most potent indicator of male social status. While commoners wore "külahs" covered with 'abani' or 'Yemeni', higher-ranking men wore a wide variety of turbans.

Royal turbans could be decorated with feathers in an ornamental aigrette. Starting from the 19th century, sultans started wearing fezzes instead of turbans. The daughters of sultans would receive luxurious jewelry when marrying, including diadems or veils with jewels embedded in them. Imperial and noble ladies would also cover their heads with small handkerchiefs and their faces with Brussels net veils.

There are not many records of women's clothing at the time, but artwork can provide some understanding. Headdresses were typically tall, pointed hats with a veil attached to them, which served to cover their faces during outings. In depictions of sultanas, their clothing is mostly fabricated with few references to what Ottoman women actually wore. A portrait of Roxelana depicts her wearing a pillbox-shaped headdress with decorative jewels on the border. While her headdress illustrates popular styles in Ottoman women's headwear at the time, her clothing remains very similar to European-style clothing. This was a popular way to depict women, specifically sultanas.

Many factors contributed to changes in Ottoman women's garments, including the cost of materials and firmans, or royal declarations. At the beginning of the 18th century, upper-class women began wearing yashmaks, or veils that covered their faces when going out. Over time, the yashmaks became more transparent and wider, with silver embroidery. As more changes were made to women's clothing, yashmaks and feraces were seen less as garments to cover the body, and more as decorative and ornamental styles.

In the 19th century, there were more extreme changes in women's clothing. Yemenis, or headscarves, were so thin that their hair was almost all visible. Other traditional garments combined Turkish and European fashions. Around World War I, Turkish women began wearing headscarves tied below the chin instead of the carsaf, a robe-like dress that covered the whole body and head except for the eyes.

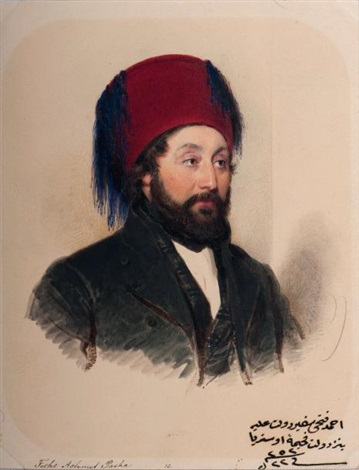
Ambassador Ahmed Fethi Pasha in Western clothing, 1835

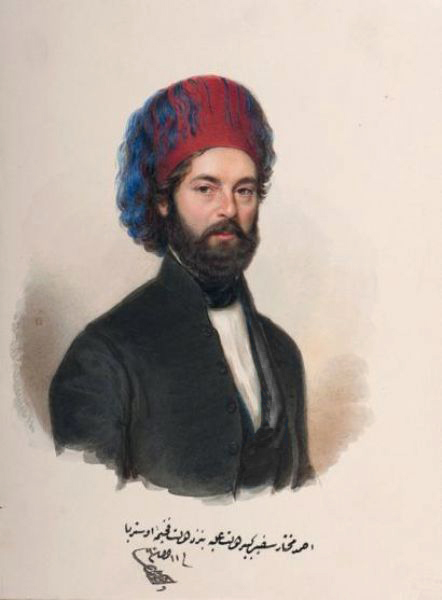
Diplomat Ahmed Muhtar Bey in Western clothing, 1844

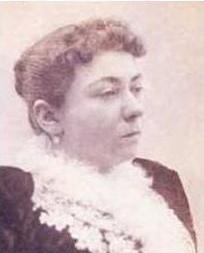
Fatma Aliye Topuz was one of the first women's rights activists, appearing in Western clothing throughout her public life

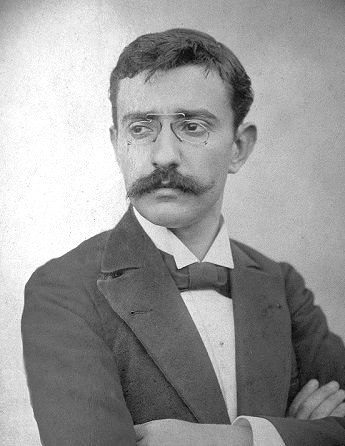
Western dress was adopted by administrators and the wealthy during the Tanzimat period (The person being depicted is Salih Zeki Bey.)

== Ottoman influence on Western female dress ==
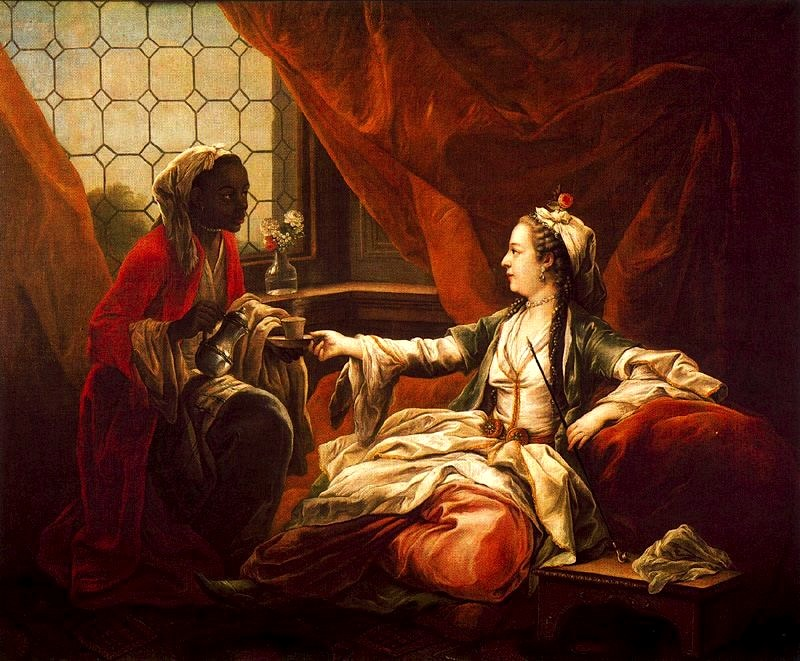
Madame de Pompadour portrayed as a Turkish lady in 1747 by Charles André van Loo

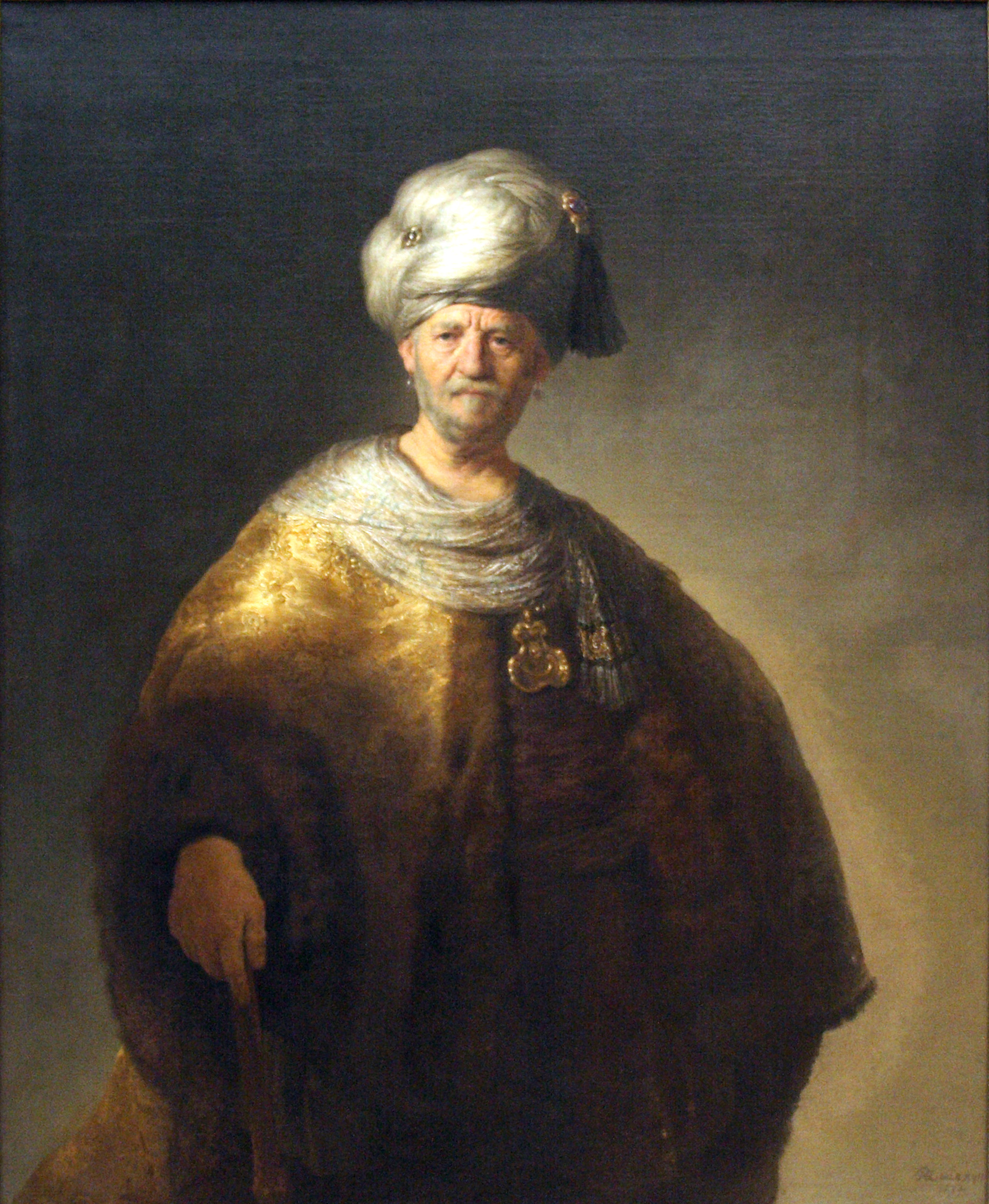
Man In Oriental Costume ("The Noble Slav"), oil on canvas, by Rembrandt, 1632. A significant example of European emulation of Ottoman dress for the purpose of portraying a dignified, elite appearance.

Interactions between Ottomans and Britons occurred throughout history. After diplomatic relations between the British and Ottoman empires were established in 1580, trade between the two nations increased. Common trades between Ottoman and British merchants involved textiles and fabrics; it was not uncommon to see British merchants loading their baggage with Ottoman garments on the way home. Theatrical productions also played a large role in piquing the interest of Europeans in Ottoman dress. In the 1530s, even before diplomatic relations were established, King Henry VIII dressed as a Turkish sultan for a court masquerade party.

As early as the 17th century, British interest in the fashion of Ottoman women began with the publication of travelers' accounts containing visual descriptions of Ottoman fashion. In the 18th century, however, European visitors and residents in the Ottoman Empire markedly increased. As such, fashion is one method to gauge the increased interactions. At this time, Paris was considered the center of the Ottoman fashion movement in Europe. Turkomania became a fashion fad after the publication of a French illustration album containing engravings of Ottoman outfits. This trend quickly spread to other nations. In 1768, the King of Denmark, Christian VII, held a ball in London where all guests were expected to attend dressed in Ottoman garb.

In addition to Western Europe, Ottoman fashion had an outsized impact on Central and Eastern European nations such as Poland and Hungary. Initially influenced by Western European looks, by the 16th century, Eastern European fashion had a distinct Ottoman flair to it. For example, noblemen favored long, floor-length kaftans with flashy red coloring, slit sleeves, and embroidery. Others wore Turkish kalpaks (high hats) and Ottoman-style leather slippers. In a 1583 portrait, Polish ruler Stephen Báthory is depicted as wearing a kontusz (a garment first introduced to Poland by leaders displaying them as spoils of war), Ottoman-style zupan, and bright yellow Turkish boots. These garments soon became the standard for Polish and Hungarian nobility alike, as two fashions that had once been extremely different had converged due to their Ottomanization.

Turkomania also had a significant effect on gendered clothing. Historically, Europeans clothing was more delineated between male and female dress. Hose and trousers were reserved for men, and skirts were for women. Conversely, in the Ottoman Empire, male and female dress was more similar. A common item worn by both was the şalvar, a voluminous undergarment in white fabric shaped like what is today called "harem pants". To British women traveling in the Ottoman Empire, the şalvar quickly became a symbol of freedom because they observed that Ottoman women had more rights than British women. Lady Mary Wortley Montagu (1689–1762), wife of the British ambassador to Constantinople, noted in her Turkish Embassy Letters that Ottoman women "possessed legal property rights and protections that far surpassed the rights of Western women". Female travelers often gained an intimate view of Ottoman culture, since as women, they had easier access to the Muslim elite harems than did men. Şalvar successfully spread into Europe at the end of the 19th century as various female suffragists and feminists used şalvar as a symbol of emancipation. Upon Lady Montagu's return to England, she began dressing like Ottoman women to support the cause of the women's suffrage movement, which was just gaining traction at the time. Other British women of distinction, such as Lady Janey Archibald Campbell (1845–1923), and Lady Ottoline (Violet Anne) Morrell (1873–1938) wore şalvar "in an attempt to symbolize their refusal of traditional British standards and sexual differences". Şalvar also spread beyond Europe when Amelia Jenks Bloomer modified these "Turkish trousers" to create American "bloomers". In addition to aiding the European women's suffrage movement, European exposure to Ottoman women's clothing helped dispel stereotypes about Muslim women. Elizabeth, Princess Berkeley, another of these British ladies of distinction, highly admired the free nature of women in the harem away from men, writing "a Turkish husband that sees a pair of slippers at the door of his harem must not enter".

In Eastern Europe, however, these new fashion trends were unique to male noblemen. Ottoman styles had little impact on the fashion of Polish and Hungarian women, who almost universally continued to don Western styles.

Another area where the Ottomans influenced female Western dress was in layering. Initially, layering had a practical use for the ancestors of the Ottoman Empire, who were pastoral nomads and horse riders, and needed to wear layers to adapt to changing temperatures. As the Ottoman Empire came into being, the layering of garments would distinguish one's gender, class, or rank within particular communities, while also displaying many sumptuous fabrics, thus signaling one's wealth and status. Layering also had spiritual significance. In Islamic art, layering different patterns represents a spiritual metaphor of the divine order that seems to be incomprehensible, but is actually planned and meaningful.

In Europe, in the 16th century, skirts began to have a layered appearance. Previous to the 16th century, skirts were slit only at the bottom, but now, the slit bisected the front of the skirt to reveal a contrasting layer underneath. Often, the underlayer would coordinate with a layered sleeve. Similarly, sleeves which allowed the second layer of fabric underneath to be seen were influenced by the concept featured in Ottoman garments, although layered and hanging sleeves arrived in Europe much earlier than layered skirts. In the 12th century, just as academic interest in Islamic scholarship was emerging in Europe, clerics began to wear both the shorter-sleeved outer garments on top, reminiscent of those on Turkish-style outer kaftans; and coats with hanging sleeves, the European tippet, very like the Turkic style designed to display rich fabrics beneath. Construction of these layer-revealing sleeves were quite different from the Turkic ones, however. Present in Europe since the 12th century, they were still of note in the account given by Lady Mary Montague in the 18th century: In a letter dated 10 March 1717, she wrote to the Countess of Marabout Hafiz (Hafsa) Sultan, a woman who was a favorite of the deposed Sultan Mustafa: "But her dress was something so surprisingly rich, that I cannot forbear describing it to you. She wore a vest called donalmá, which differs from a caftan by long sleeves and folding over the bottom. It was of purple cloth, straight to her shape, and thick-set on each side, down to her feet, and round the sleeves, with pearls of the best water, of the same size as their buttons commonly are."

== Republican period ==
By the 19th century, Western fashion began to impact Ottoman dress, with the wealthy beginning to gravitate towards Western styles. New fabrics such as wool and cotton became common, but traditional materials like silk and velvet remained in favor as well. The common clothing styles prevailing in the mid 19th century imposed by religious reasons entered a transformation phase in the Republican period. In this period the 'şapka' and the following 'kılık kıyafet' reform being realized with the leadership of Mustafa Kemal Atatürk in Kastamonu in 1925 had a full impact in Istanbul. Women's 'çarşaf' and 'peçe' were replaced by a coat, scarf, and shawl. Men began to wear hats, jackets, shirts, waistcoats, ties, trousers and shoes. With the industrialization process of the 1960s, women entered the work-life and tailors were substituted by readymade clothes industry. The contemporary fashion concept, as it is in the whole world, is apparent in both social and economic dimensions in Turkey as well.

== Modern use ==
Modern Turkish designers such as Rıfat Özbek, Cemil İpekçi, Vural Gökçaylı, Yıldırım Mayruk, Sadık Kızılağaç, Hakan Elyaban, and Bahar Korçan draw inspiration from historical Ottoman designs, and Ottoman or Ottoman-inspired patterns are important to the Turkish textile industry.

== Gallery ==
Religious garb (1878)

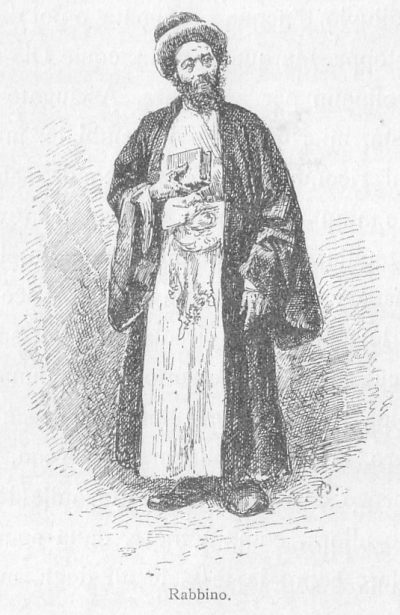
Jewish rabbi

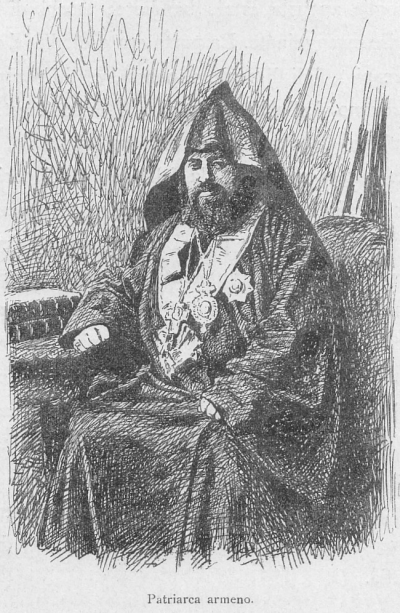
Armenian Orthodox patriarch

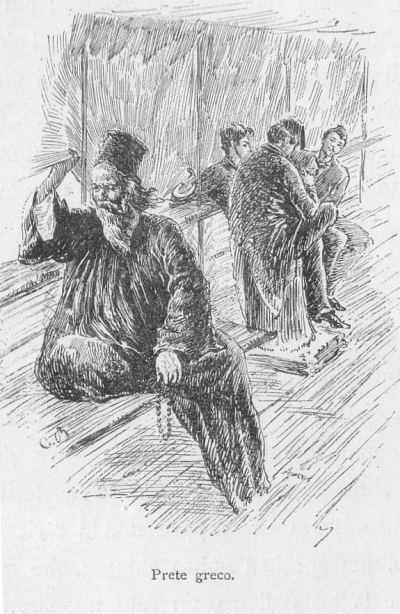
Greek Orthodox priest

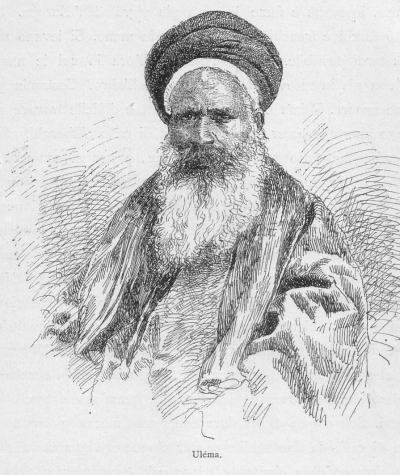
Turkish Muslim alim

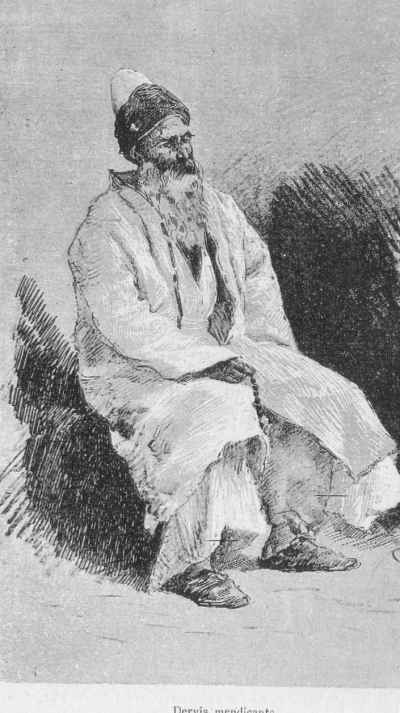
Mendicant dervish

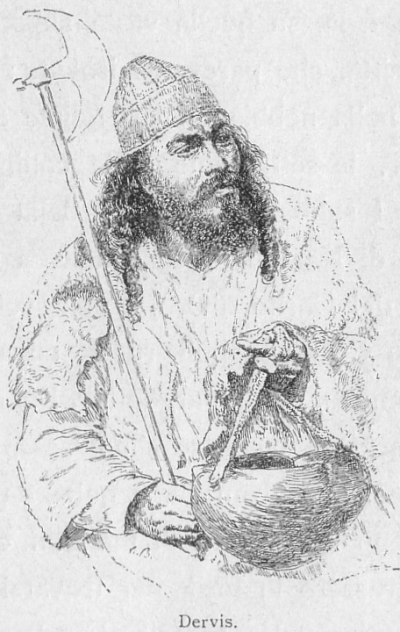
Active dervish

Everyday people (1878)

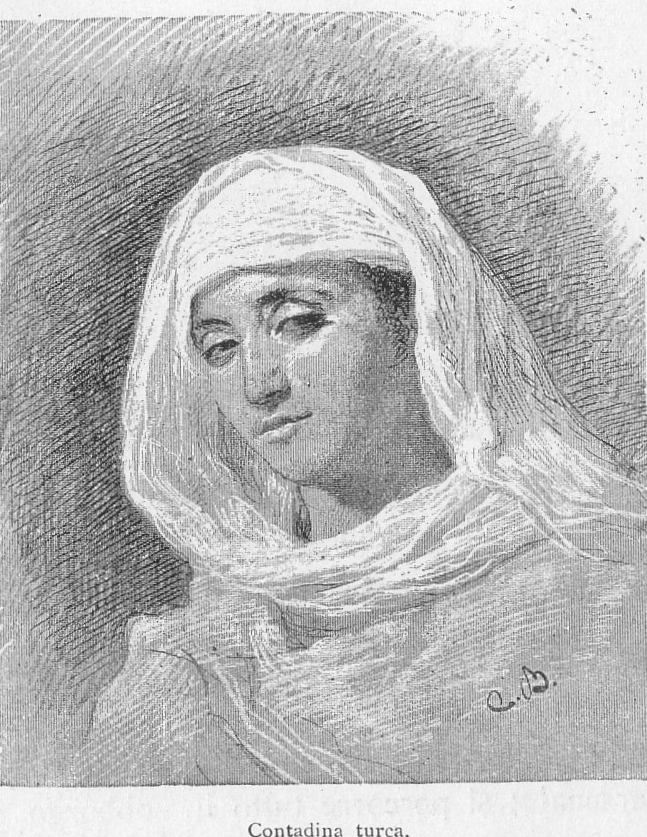
Turkish peasant

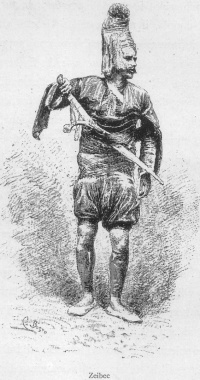
Turkish Zeybek

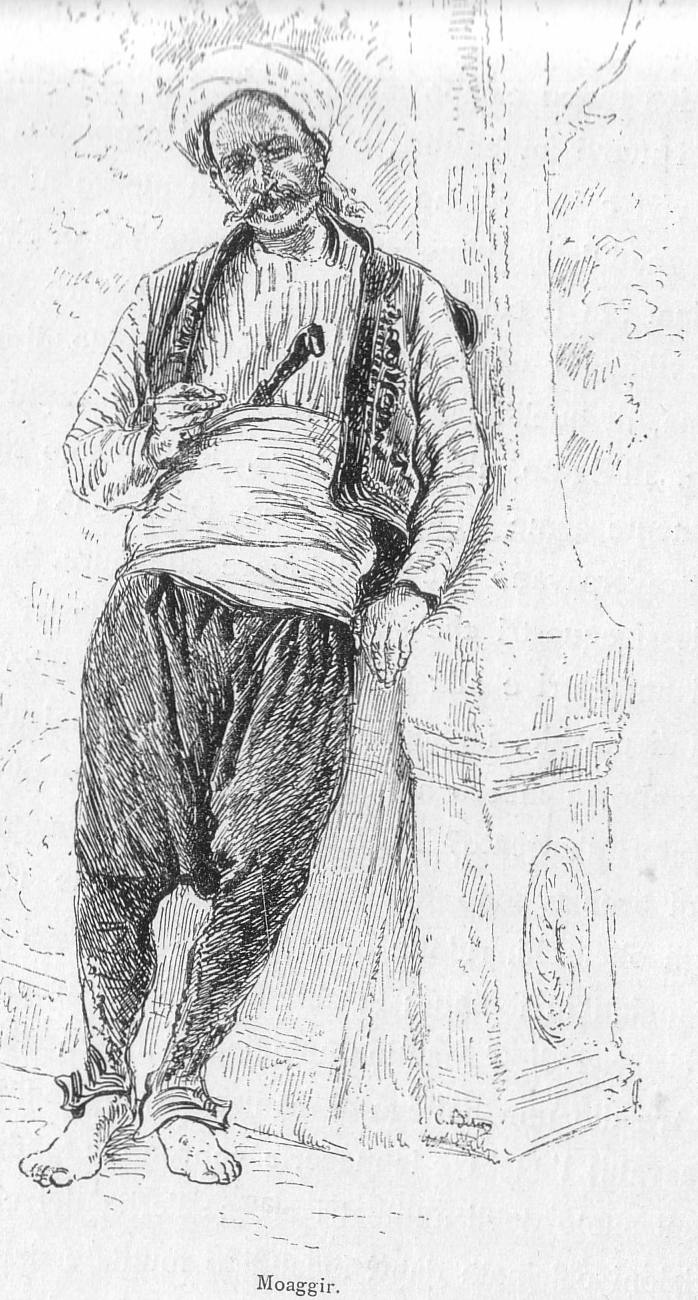
Turkish man

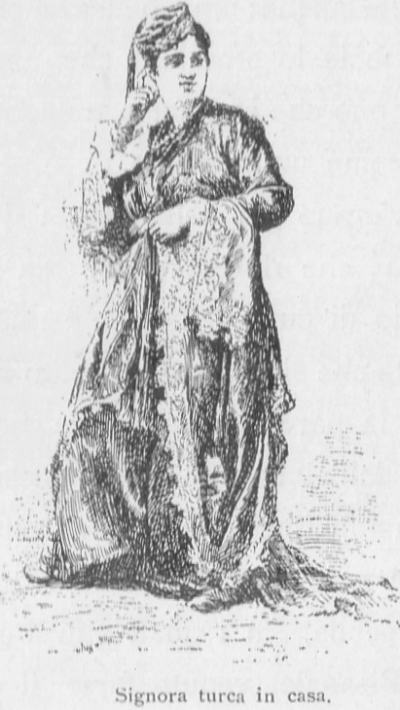
Turkish woman at home

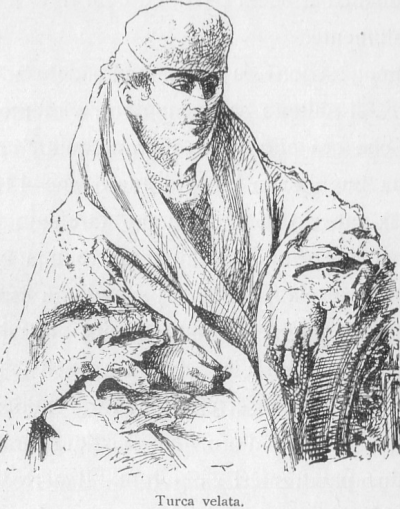
Veiled Turkish woman

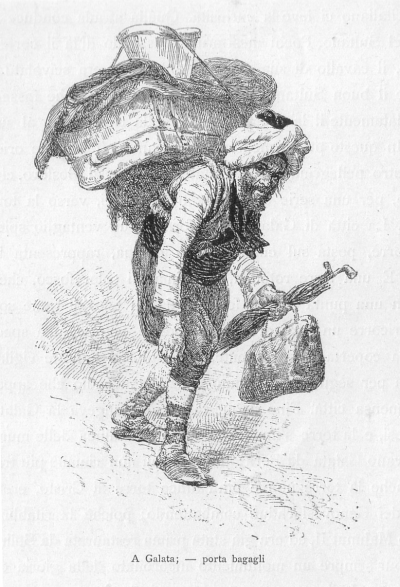
Porter

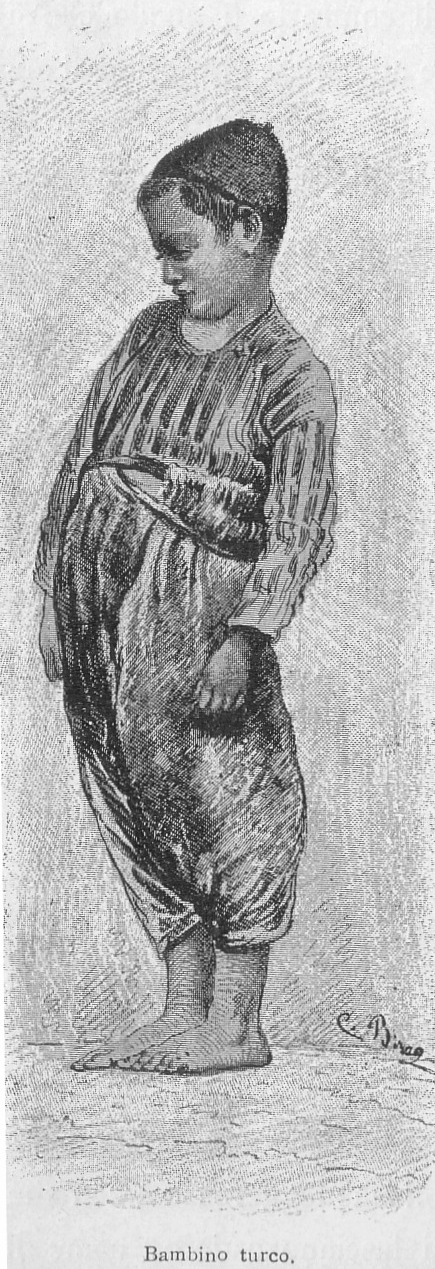
Turkish boy

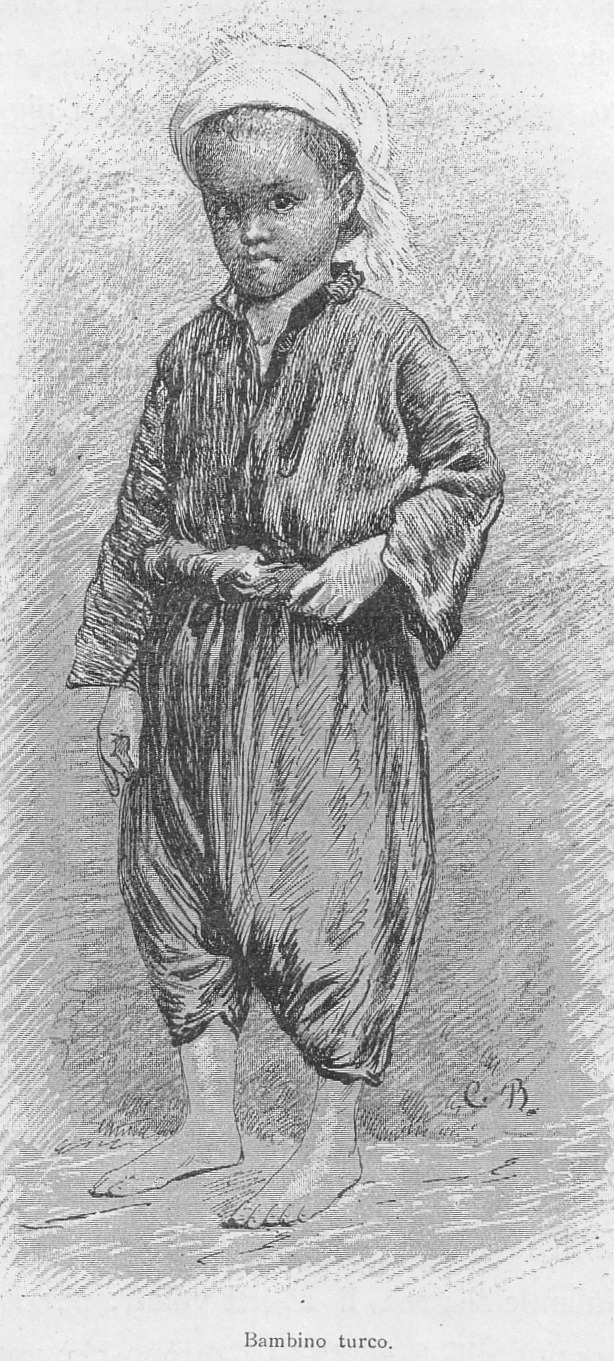
Turkish boy

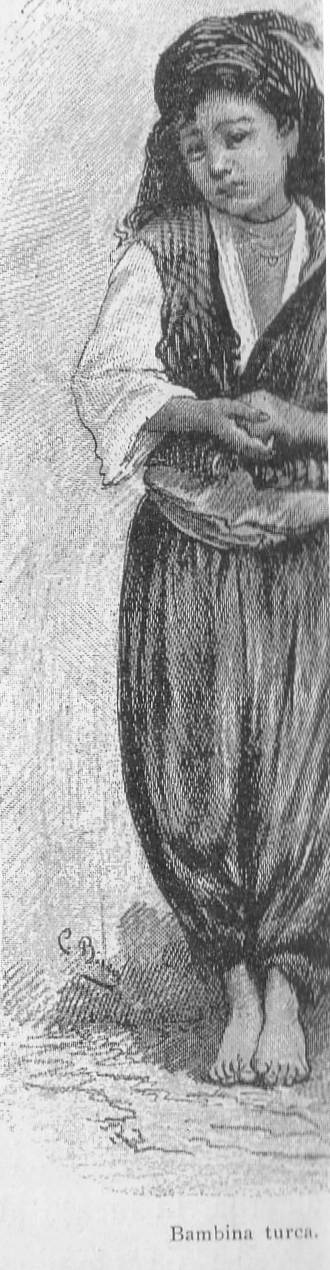
Turkish girl

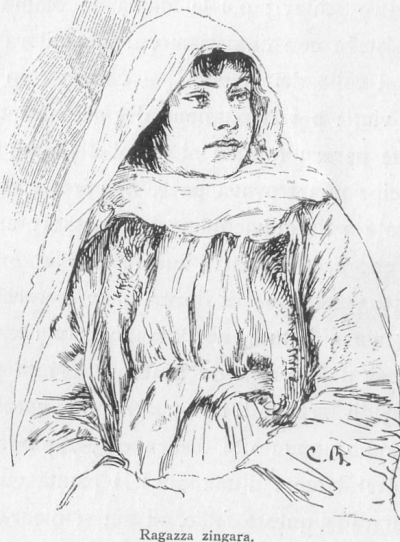
Gypsy girl

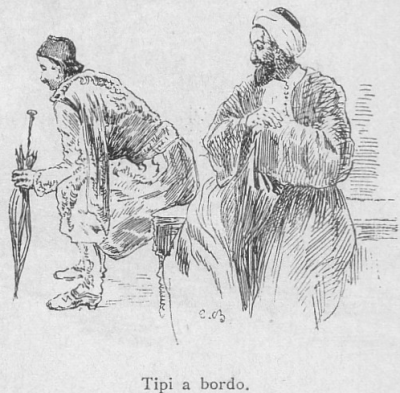
Men aboard a ferry

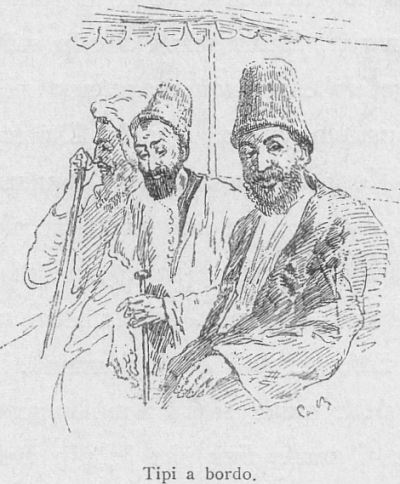
Men aboard a ferry

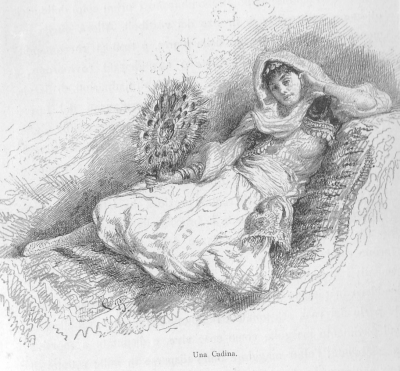
Odalisque (the caption "cadina" can also be translated to "kadın")

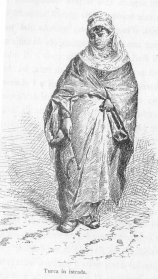
Woman outdoors

=== Folk costumes in 1873 ===
- Vilayet of Constantinople
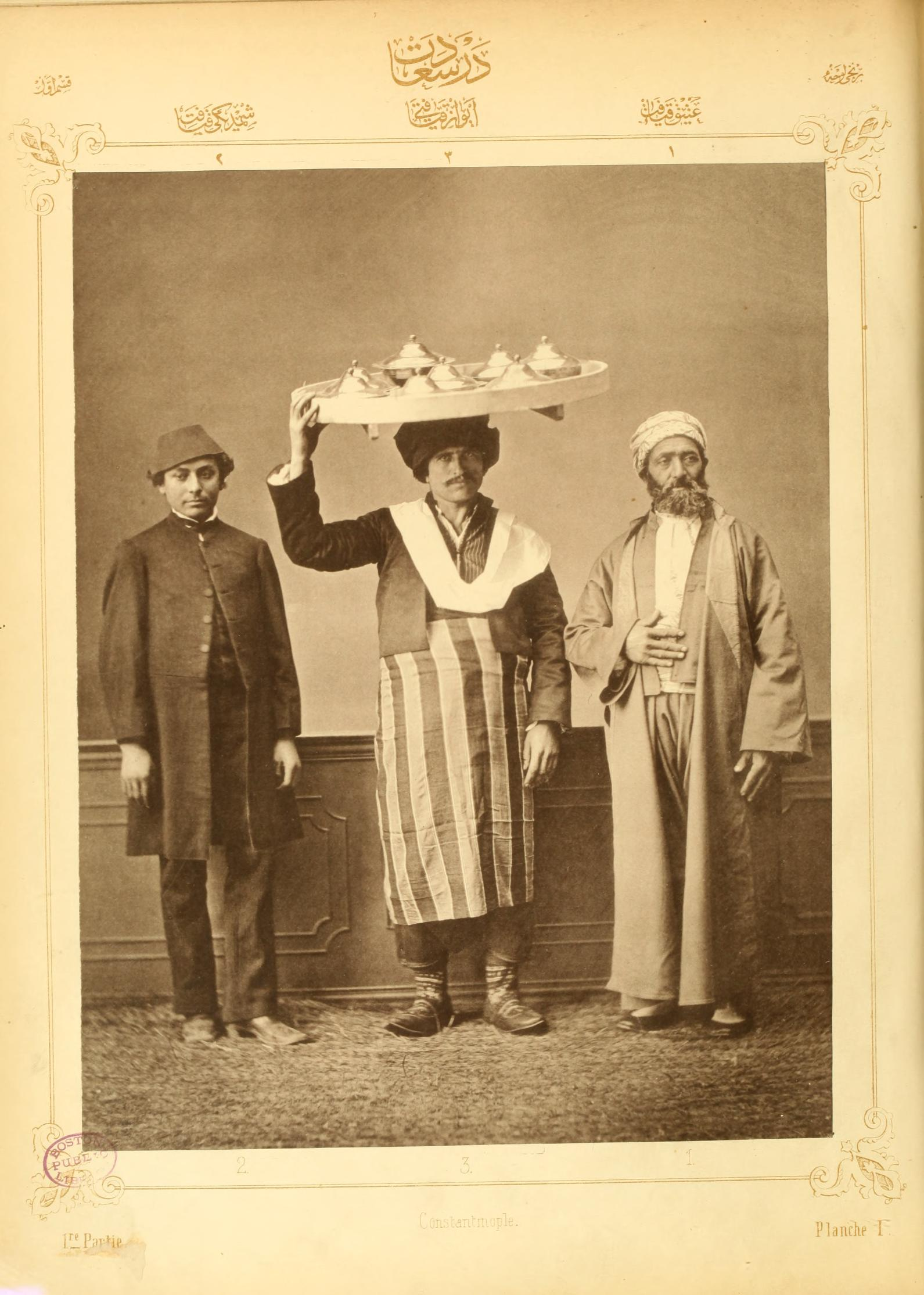
1. Burgher from Constantinople
2. Aiwas (servant)

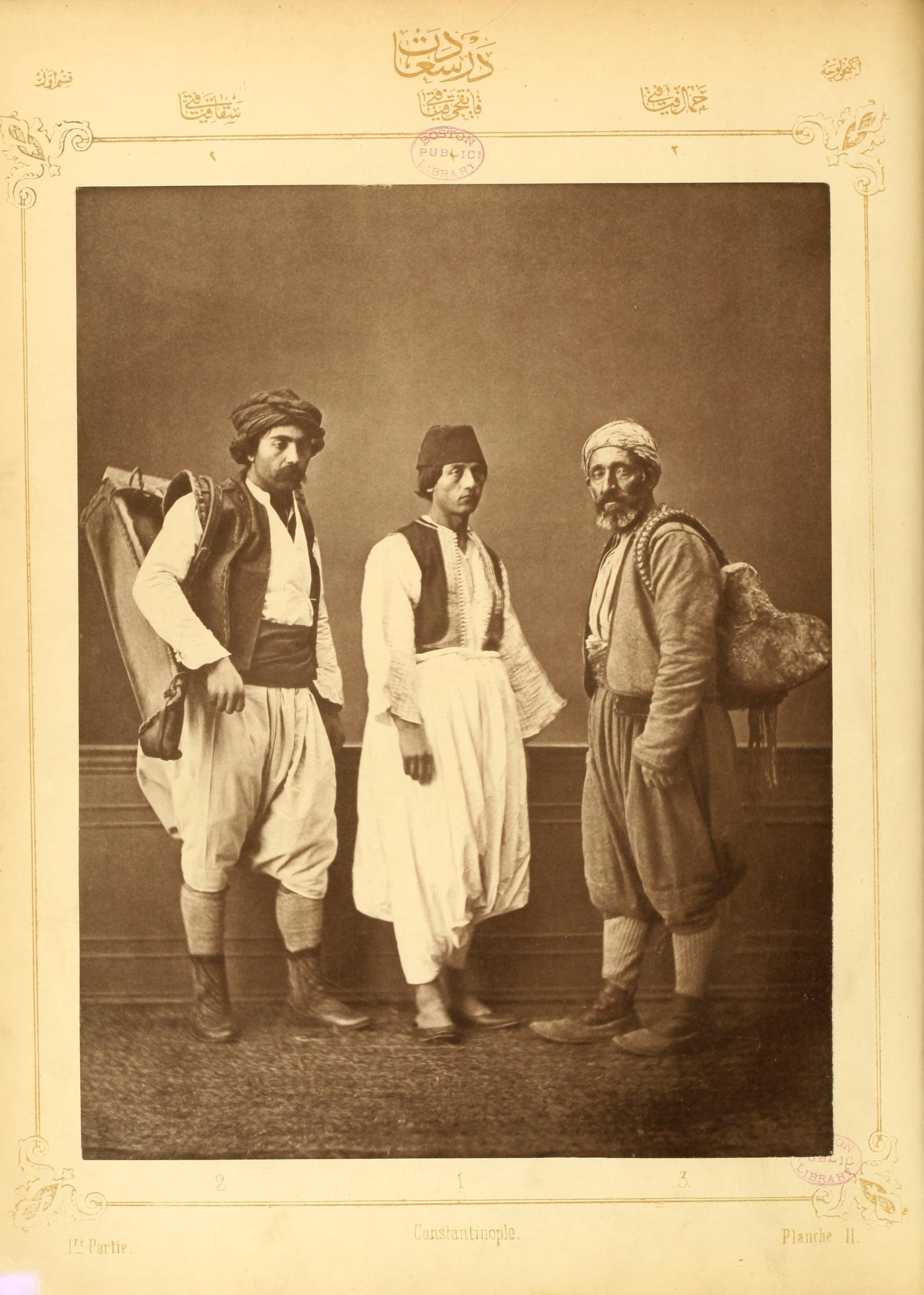
1. Caikji (boatman)
2. Sakka (water carrier)
3. Hammal (porter)

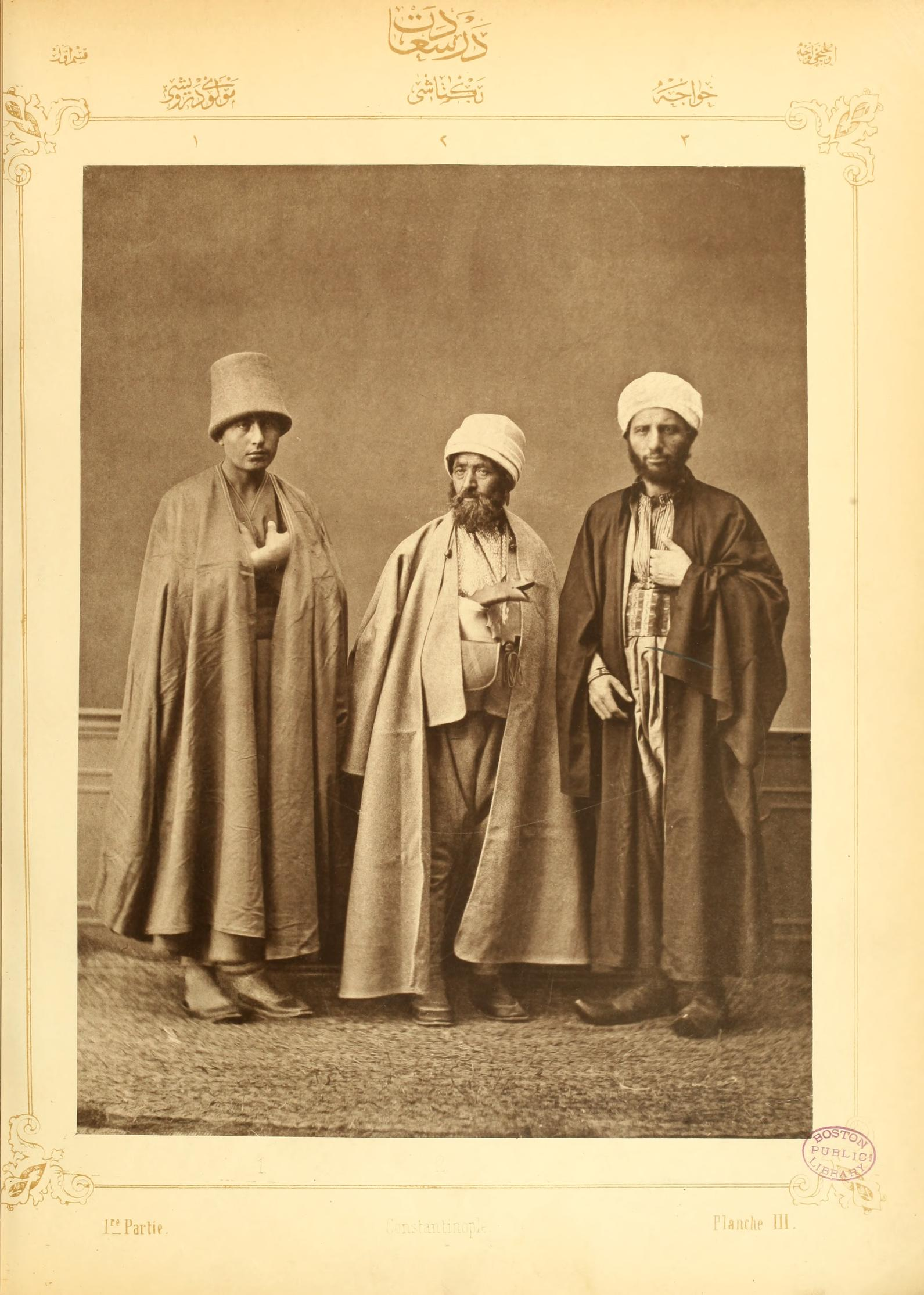
1. Mevlevi Dervish
2. Bektashi Dervish
3. Mullah

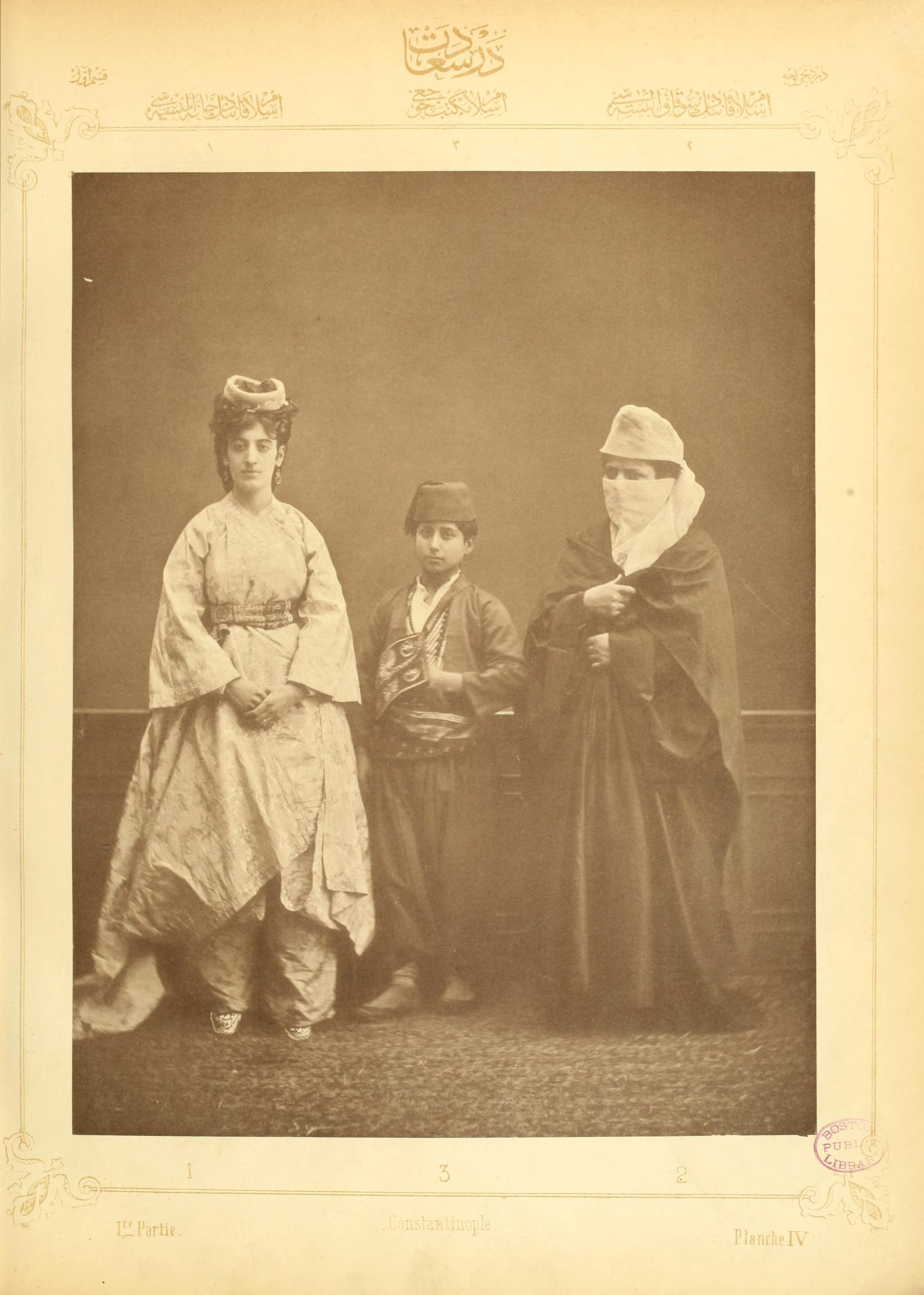
1 and 2. Turkish ladies from Constantinople
3. Turkish schoolboy

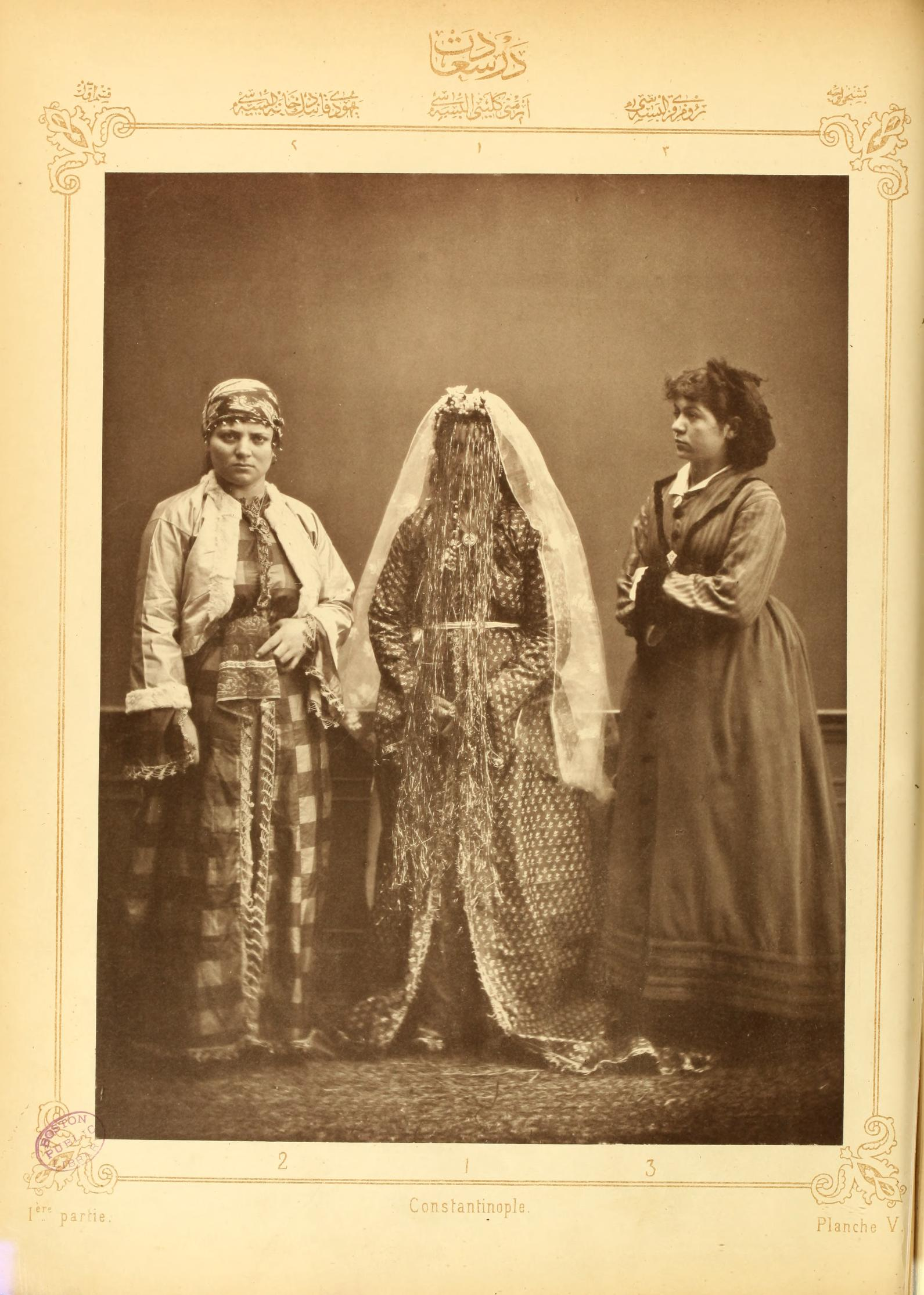
1. Armenian bride
2. Jewish woman from Constantinople
3. Greek girl
- Vilayet of Adrianople
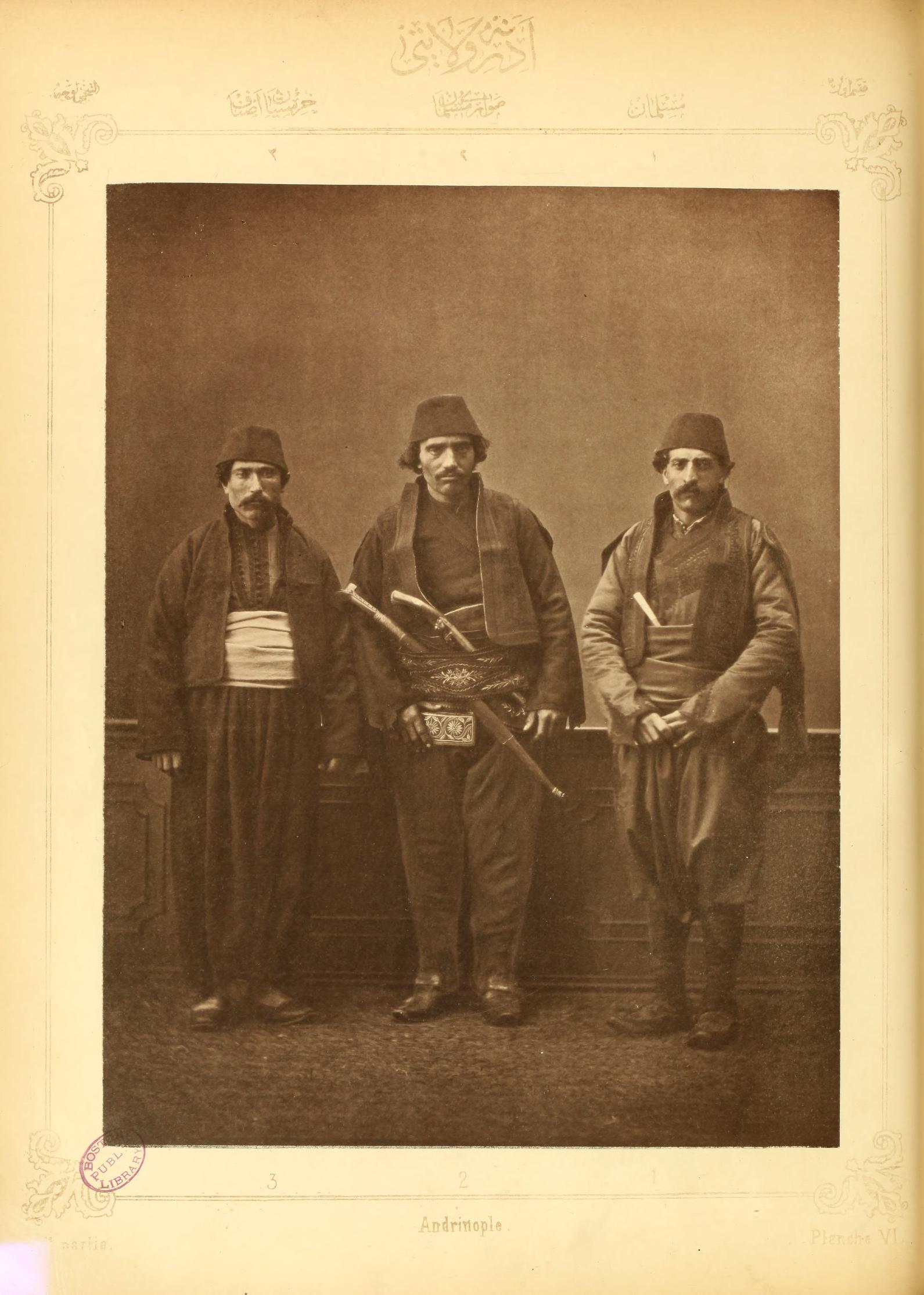
1. Muslim inhabitant of Edirne
2. Muslim horseman from Edirne
3. Christian artisan from Edirne

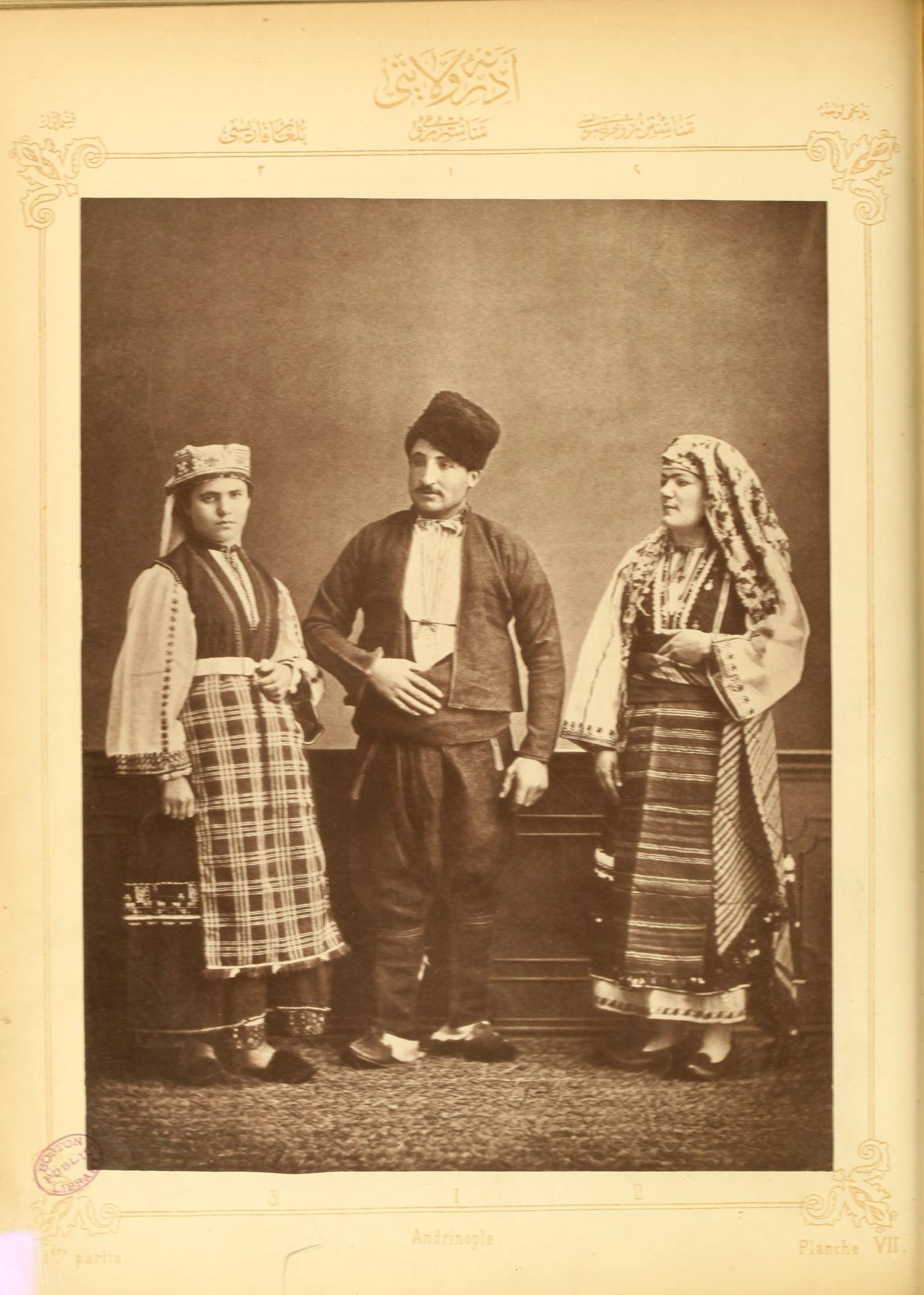
1. Macedonian peasant from Monastir
2. Macedonian peasant woman Monastir
3. Bulgarian woman from Shkodër

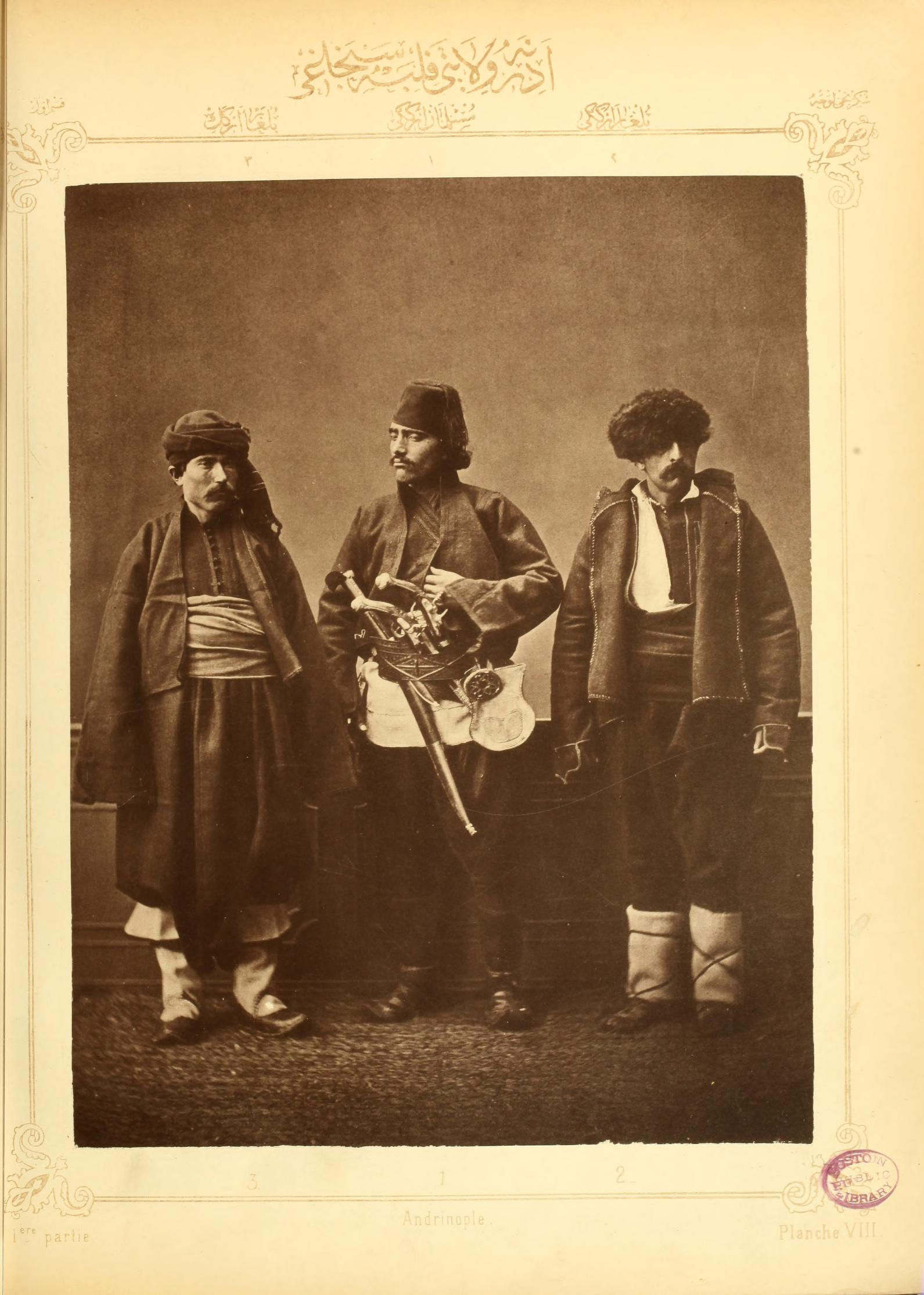
1. Muslim horseman from Plovdiv
2. Bulgarian man from Koyountepe
3. Bulgarian man from Ah'i Tchelebi

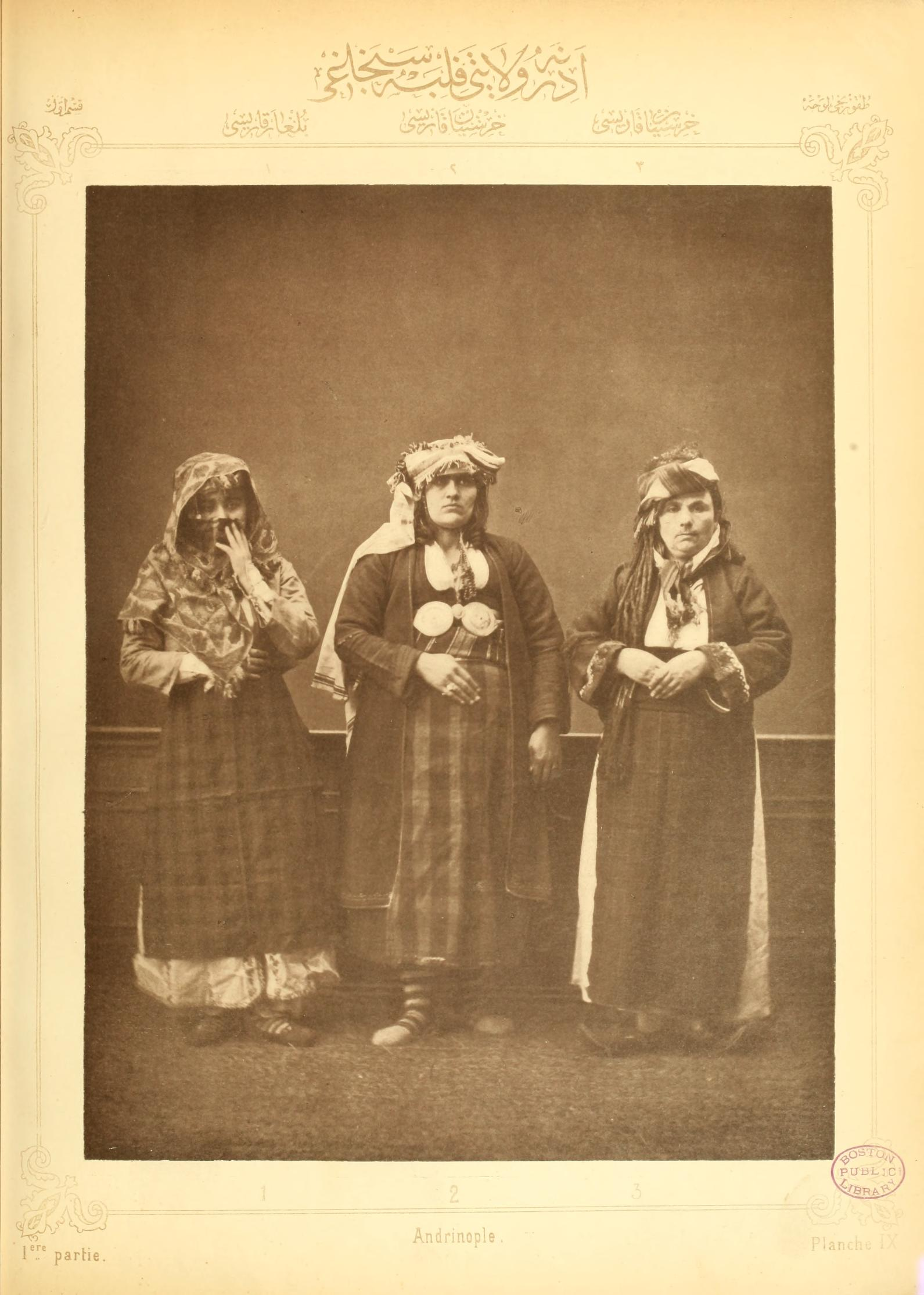
1. Bulgarian woman from Ahi Tchelebi
2. Greek woman from Haskovo
3. Peasant woman from Baidjas
- Vilayet of the Danube
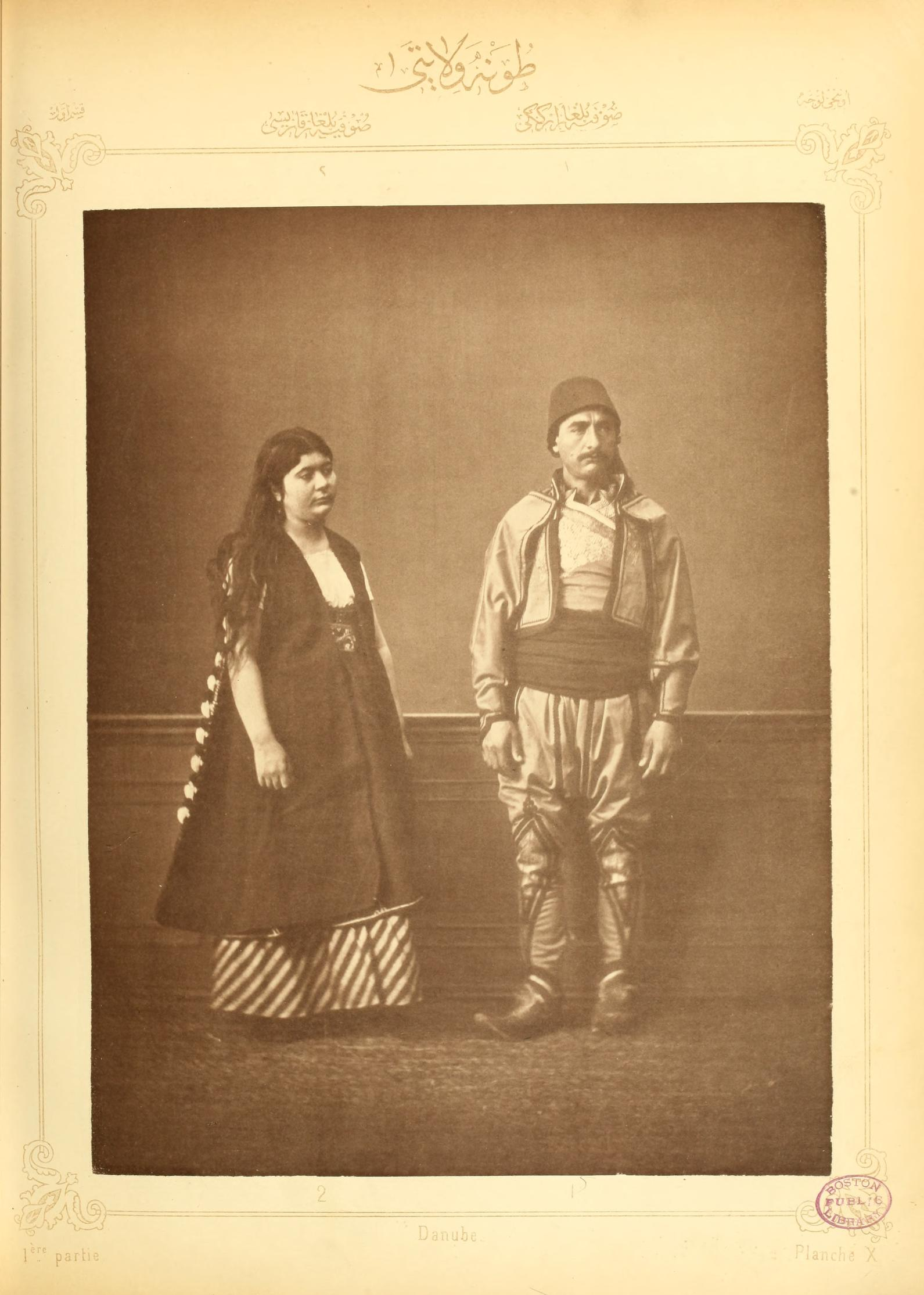
1: Bulgarian man from Sofia
2. Bulgarian woman from Sofia

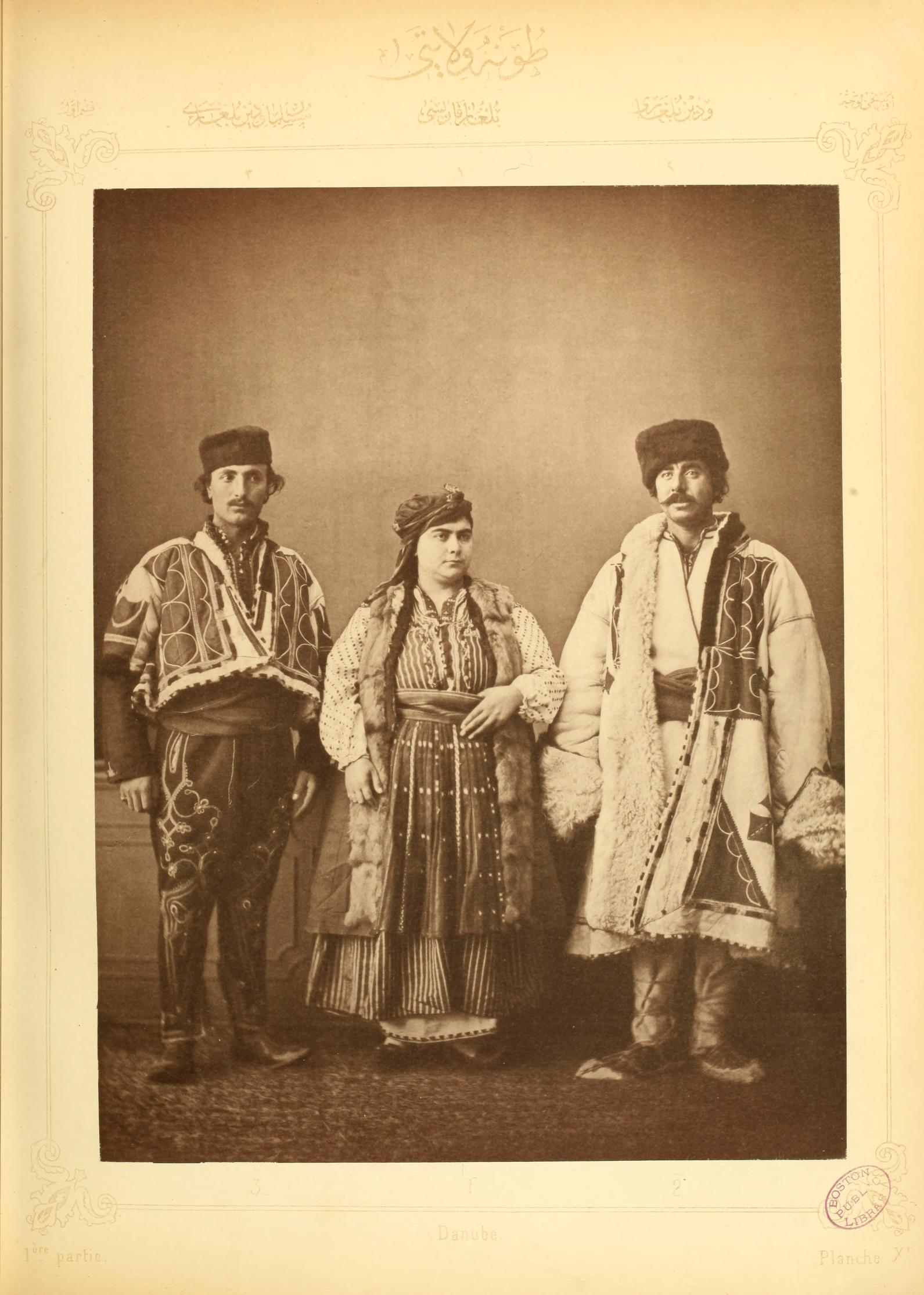
1: Bulgarian woman from Ruse
2. Christian Bulgarian from Vidin
3. Muslim Bulgarian from Vidin
- Vilayet of Prizren; Vilayet of Scutari
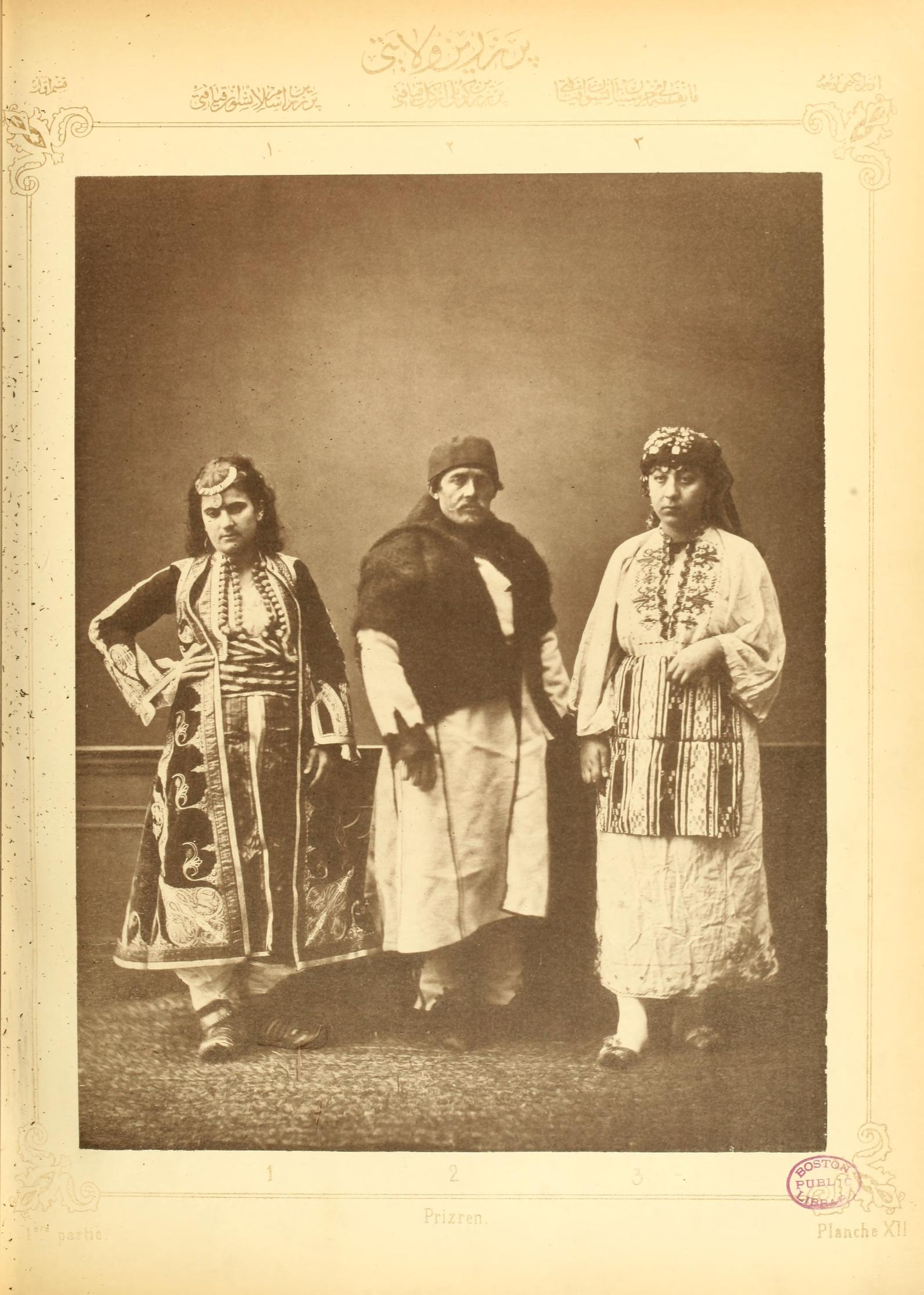
1: Muslim woman from Prizren
2. Farmers from around Prizren
3. Christian peasant woman from Matefse

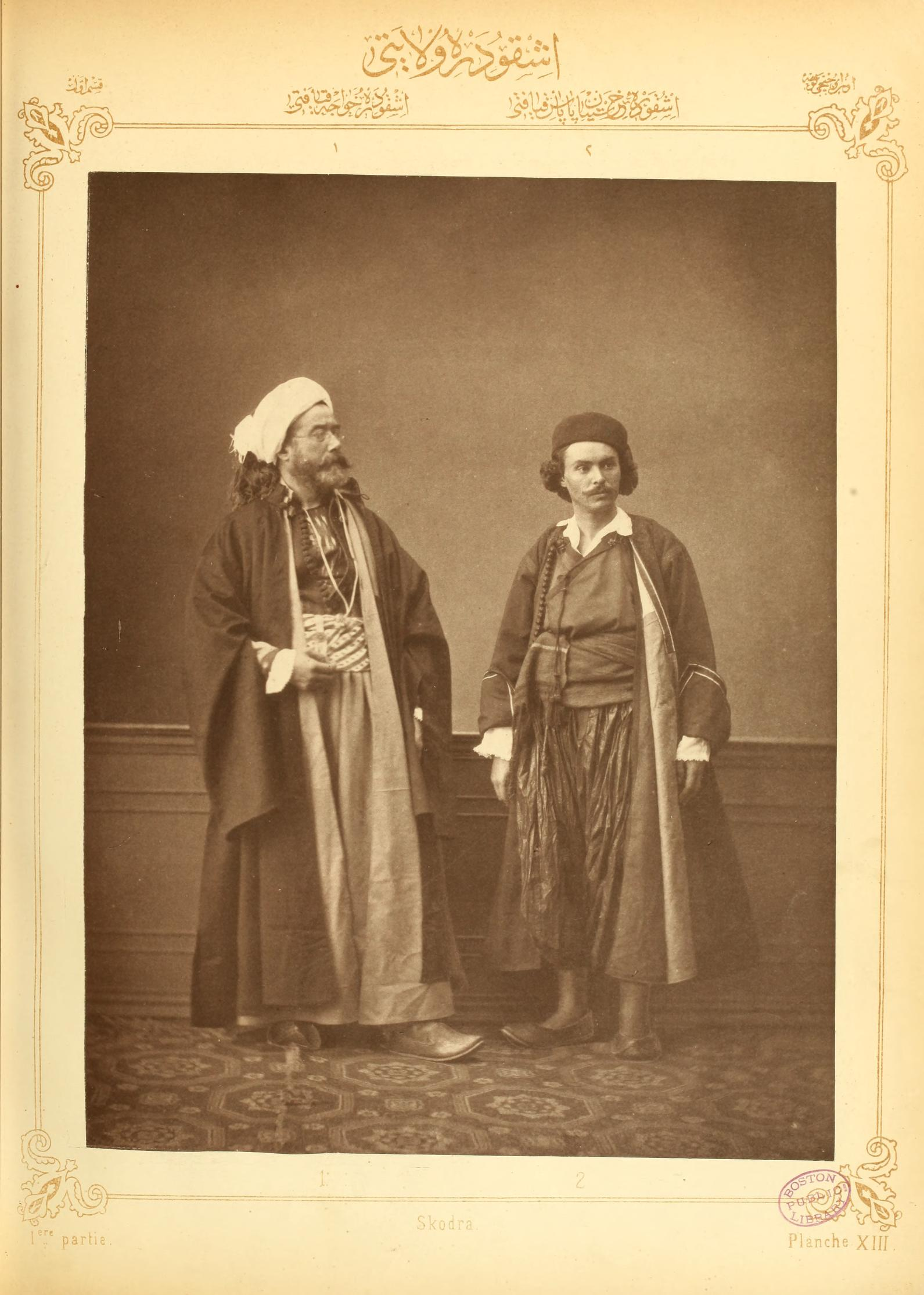
1: Hodja from Shkodër
2. Christian priest from Shkodër

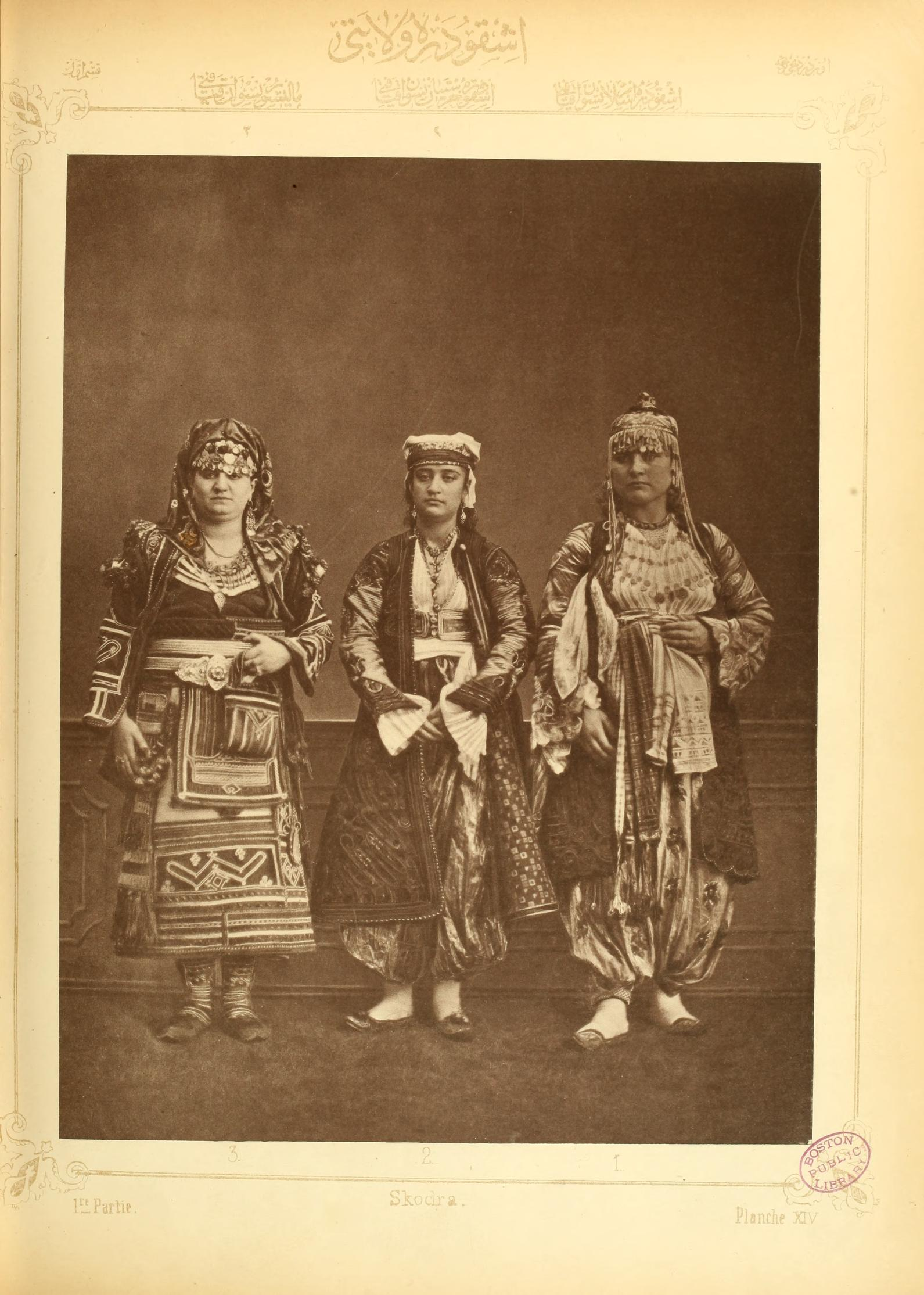
1: Muslim lady from Shkodër
2. Christian lady from Shkodër
3. Peasant woman from Malissor

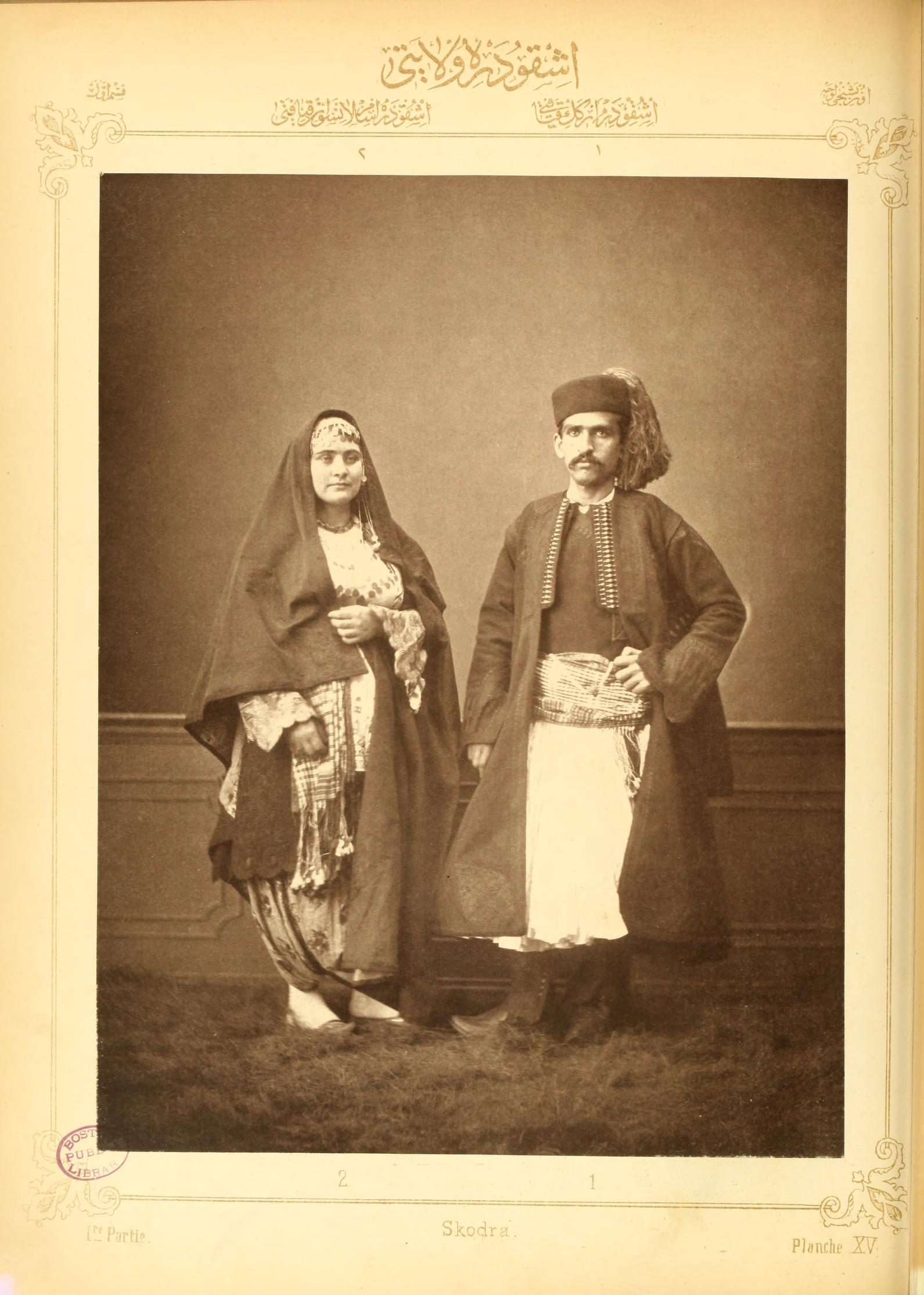
1: Muslim from Shkodër
2. Muslim lady from Shkodër

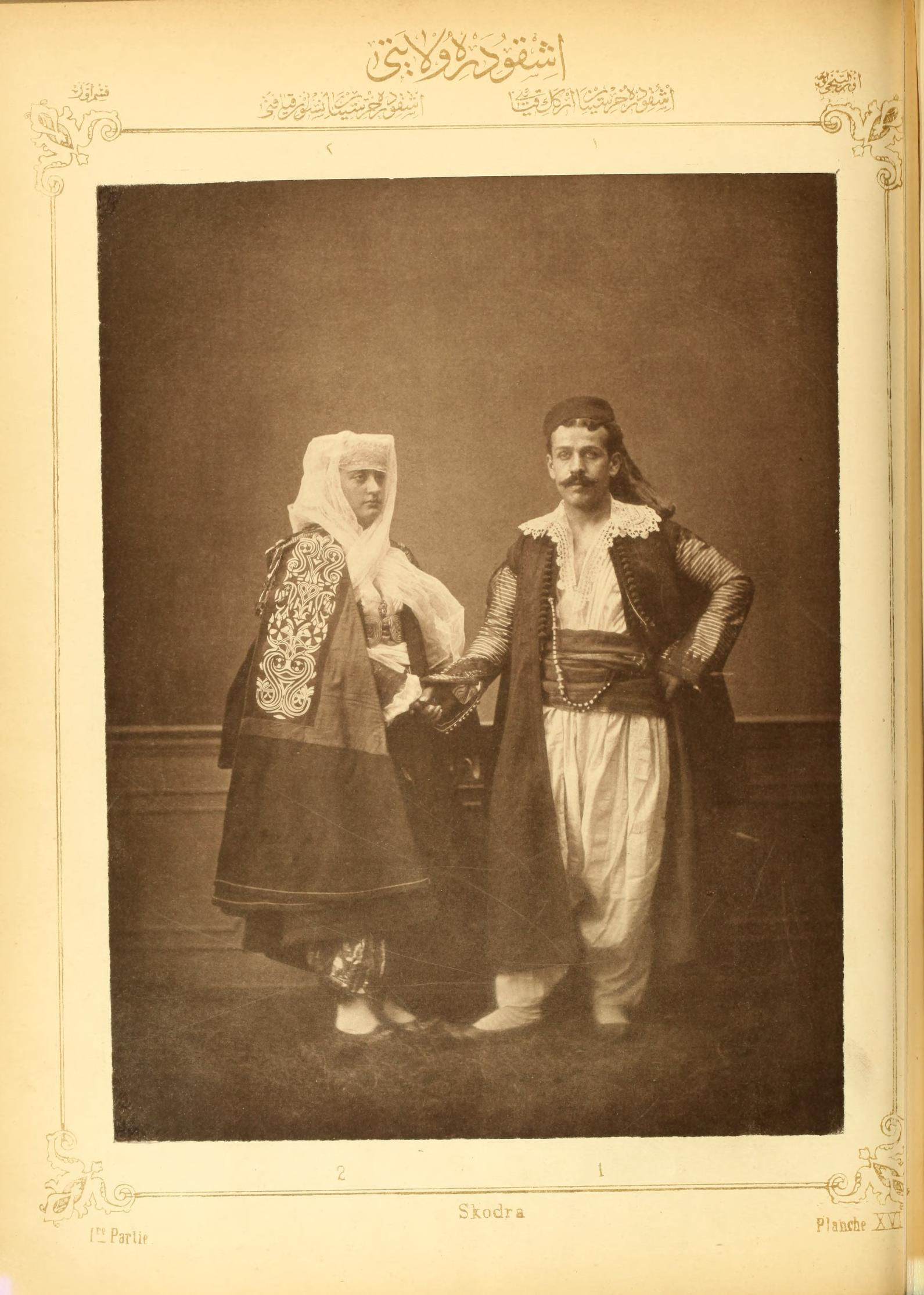
1: Christian from Shkodër
2. Christian lady from Shkodër

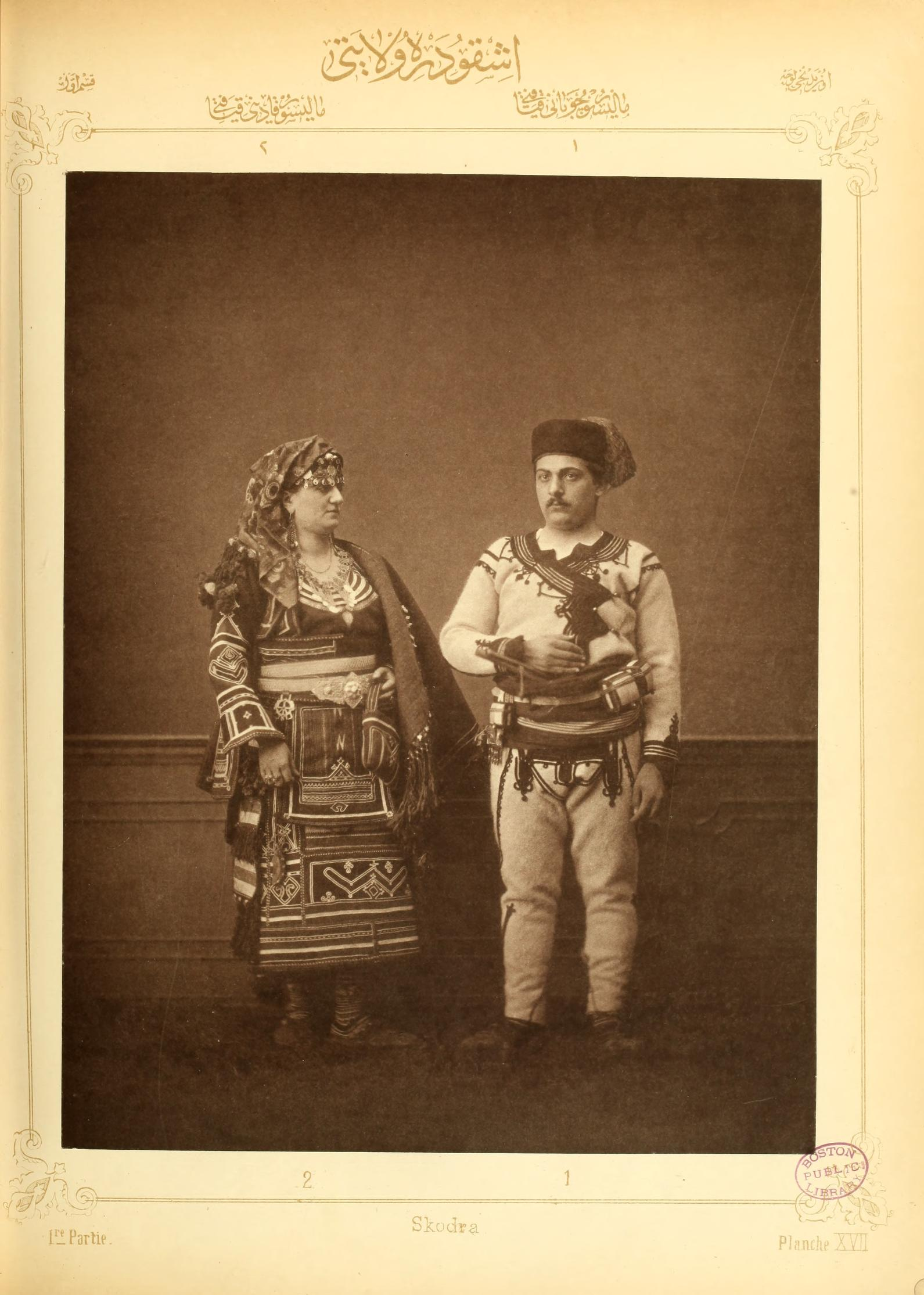
1: Shepherd and peasant woman from Malissor
- Vilayet of Janina; Vilayet of Salonica; Vilayet of Bosnia
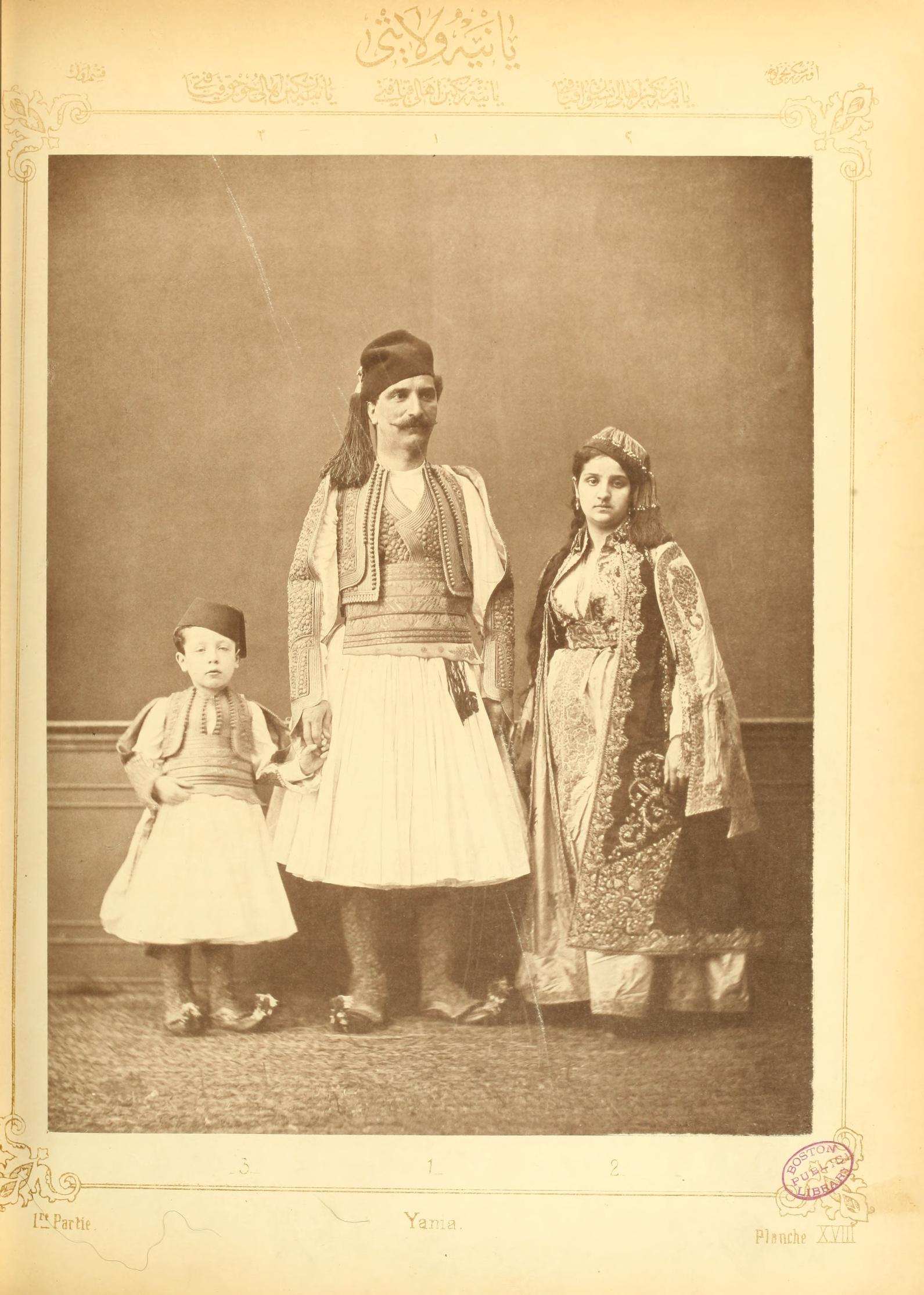
1: Wealthy Arnaut from Ioannina
2. Wealthy Arnaut lady from Ioannina
3. Arnaut child of a wealthy family.

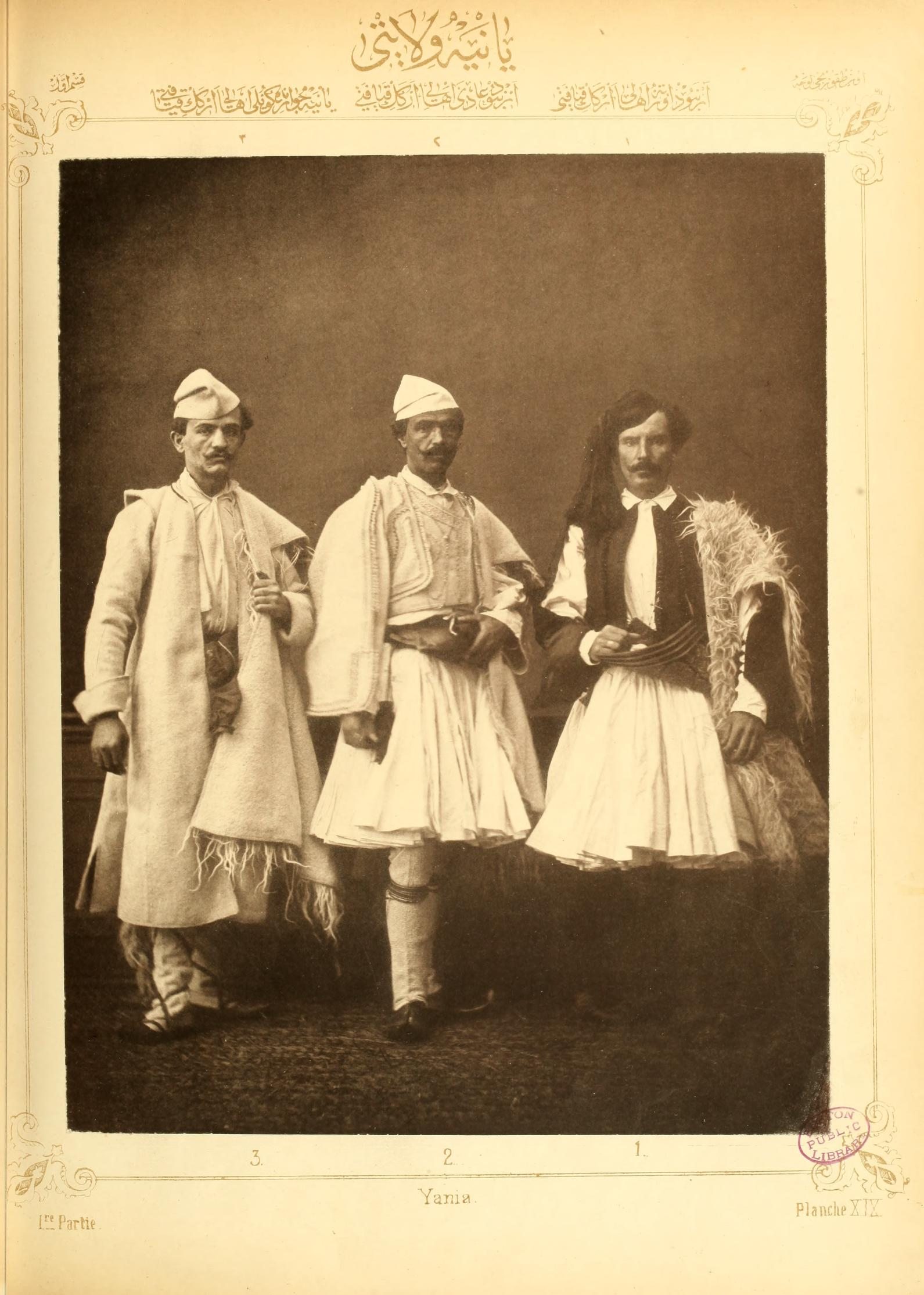
1: Arnaut from Ioannina (middle class)
2. Arnaut from Ioannina (lower class)

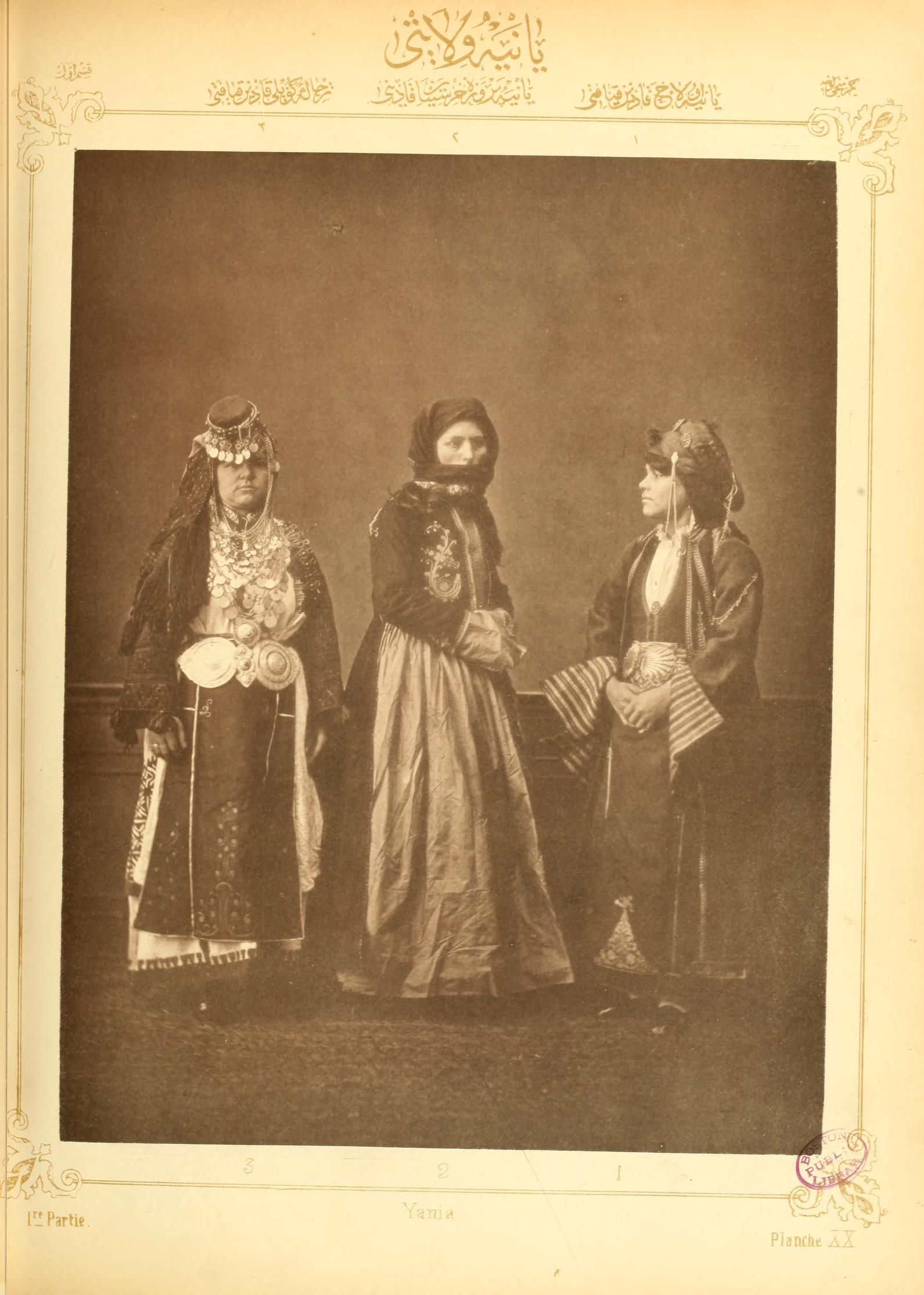
1: Wallachian (Aromanian) Woman from Ioannina
2. Christian woman from Preveza
3. Peasant woman from around Trikala

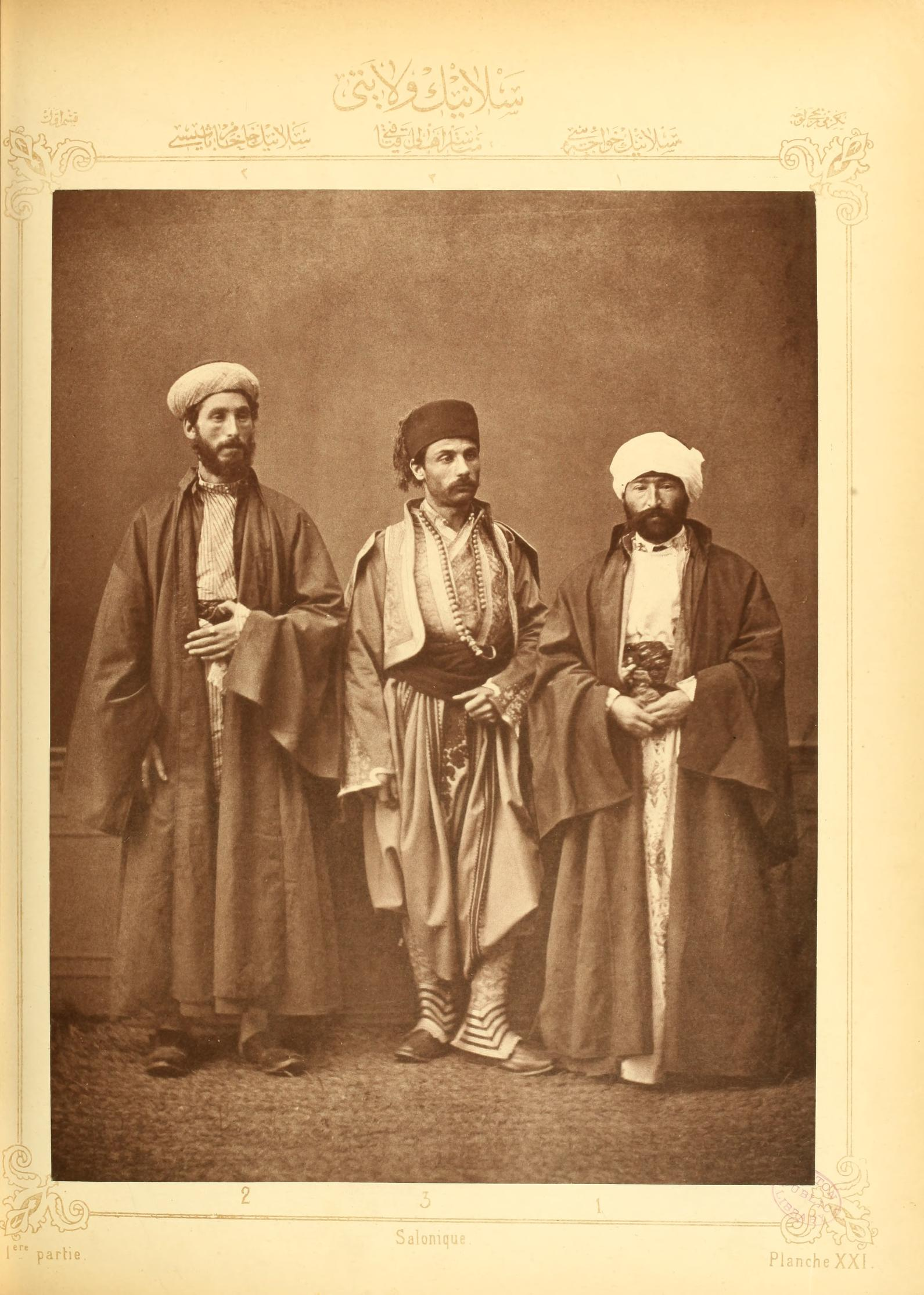
1: Hodja from Saloniki
2. Hakham Bashi of Saloniki
3. Burgher from Monastir

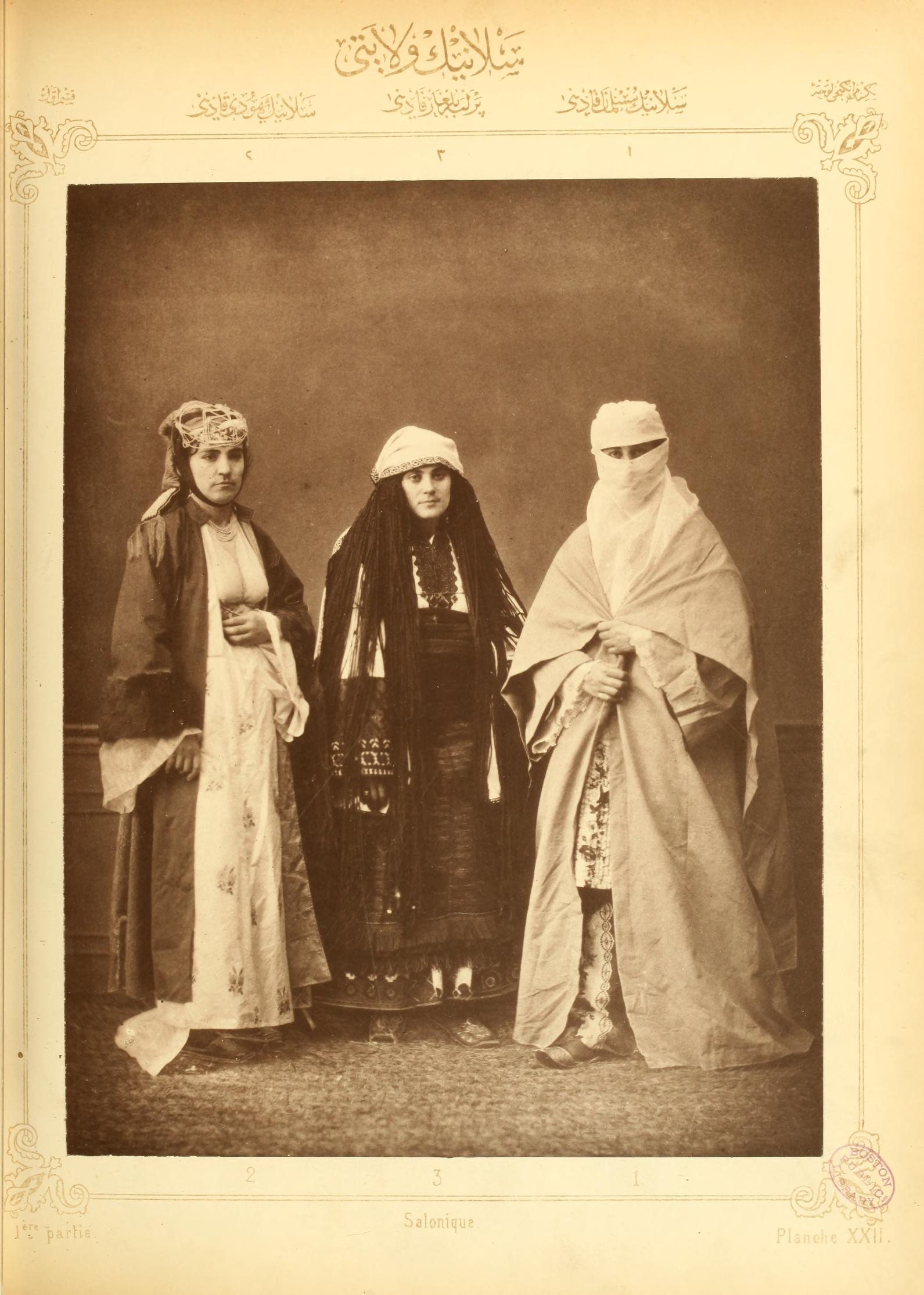
1: Muslim lady from Saloniki
2. Jewish lady from Saloniki
3. Macedonian woman from Prilep

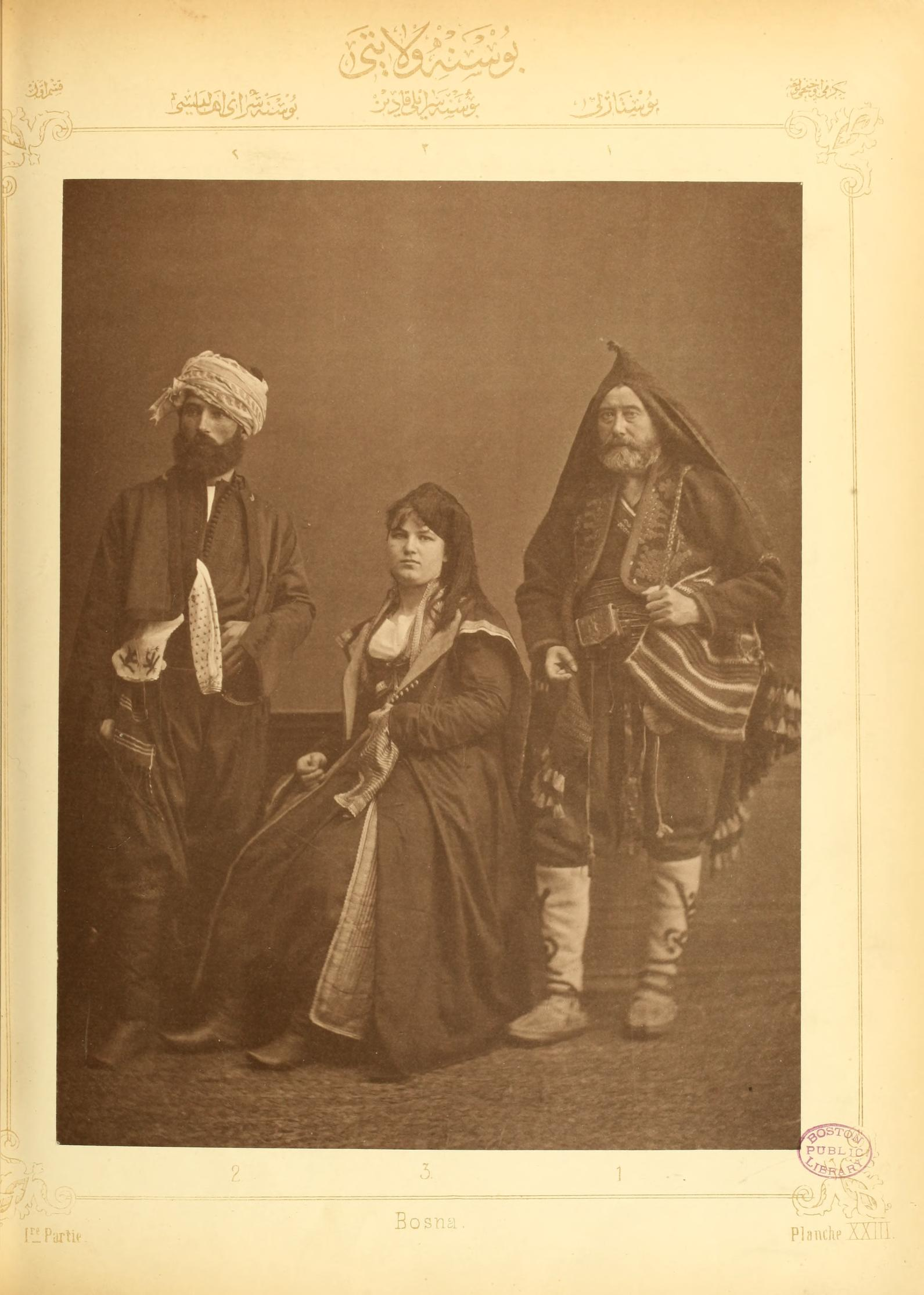
1: Inhabitant of Mostar
2. Burgher from Sarajevo
3. Lady from Sarajevo
- Vilayet of Crete
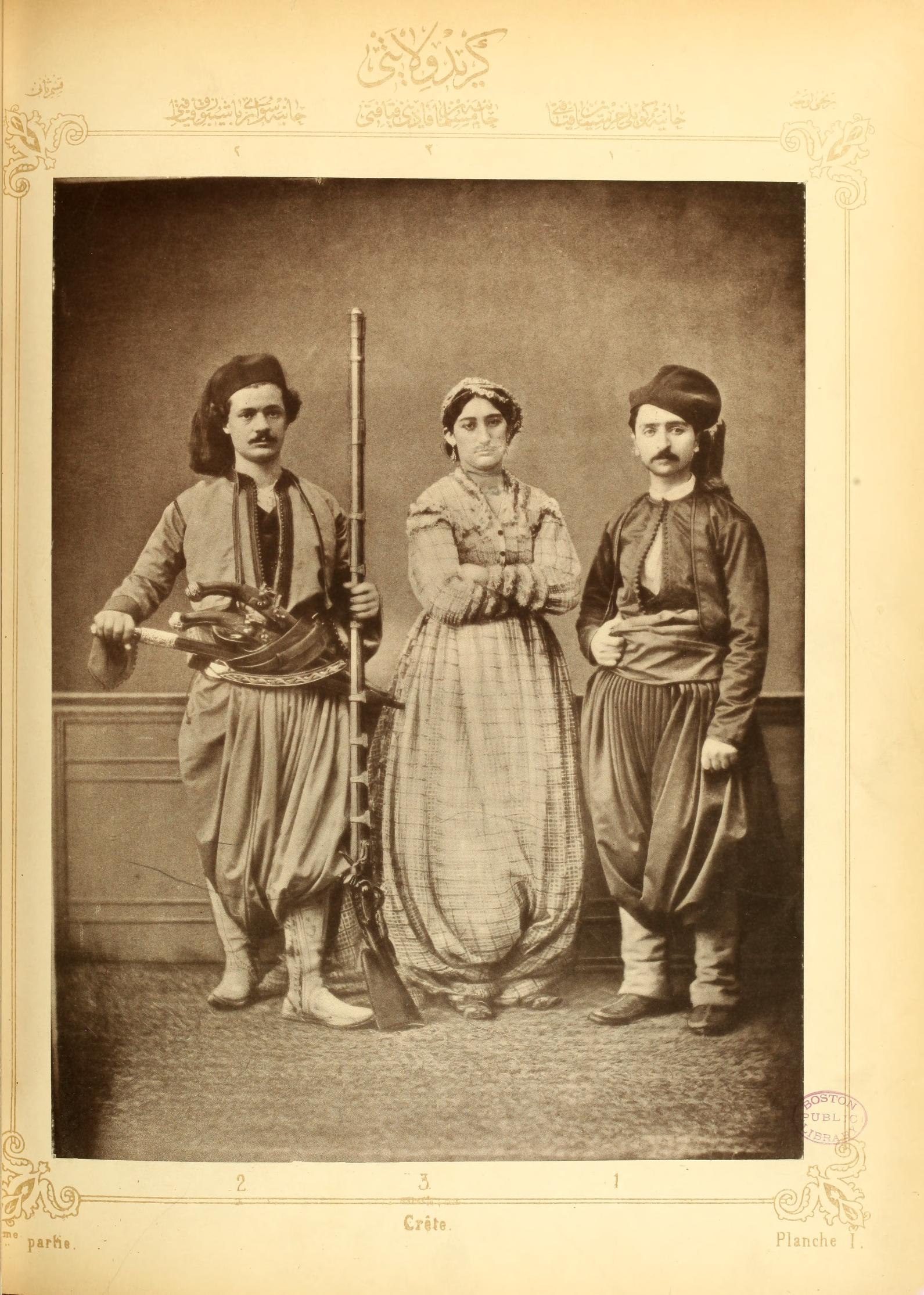
1. Christian burgher from Chania
2. Christian horseman from Chania
3. Muslim lady from Chania

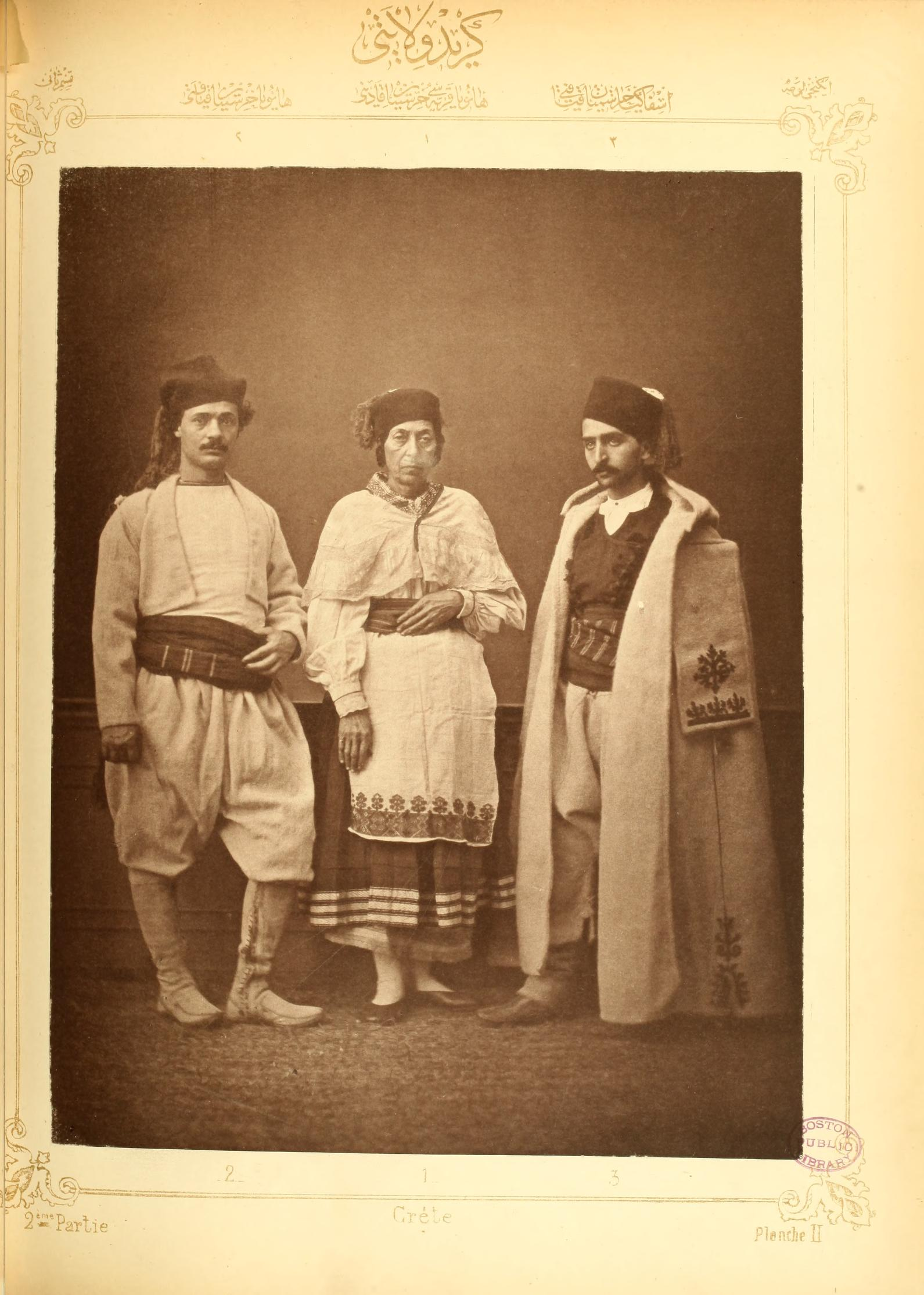
1. Female Christian villager from Chania
2. Christian villager from Chania
3. Inhabitant of Sfakia
- Vilayet of the Archipelago
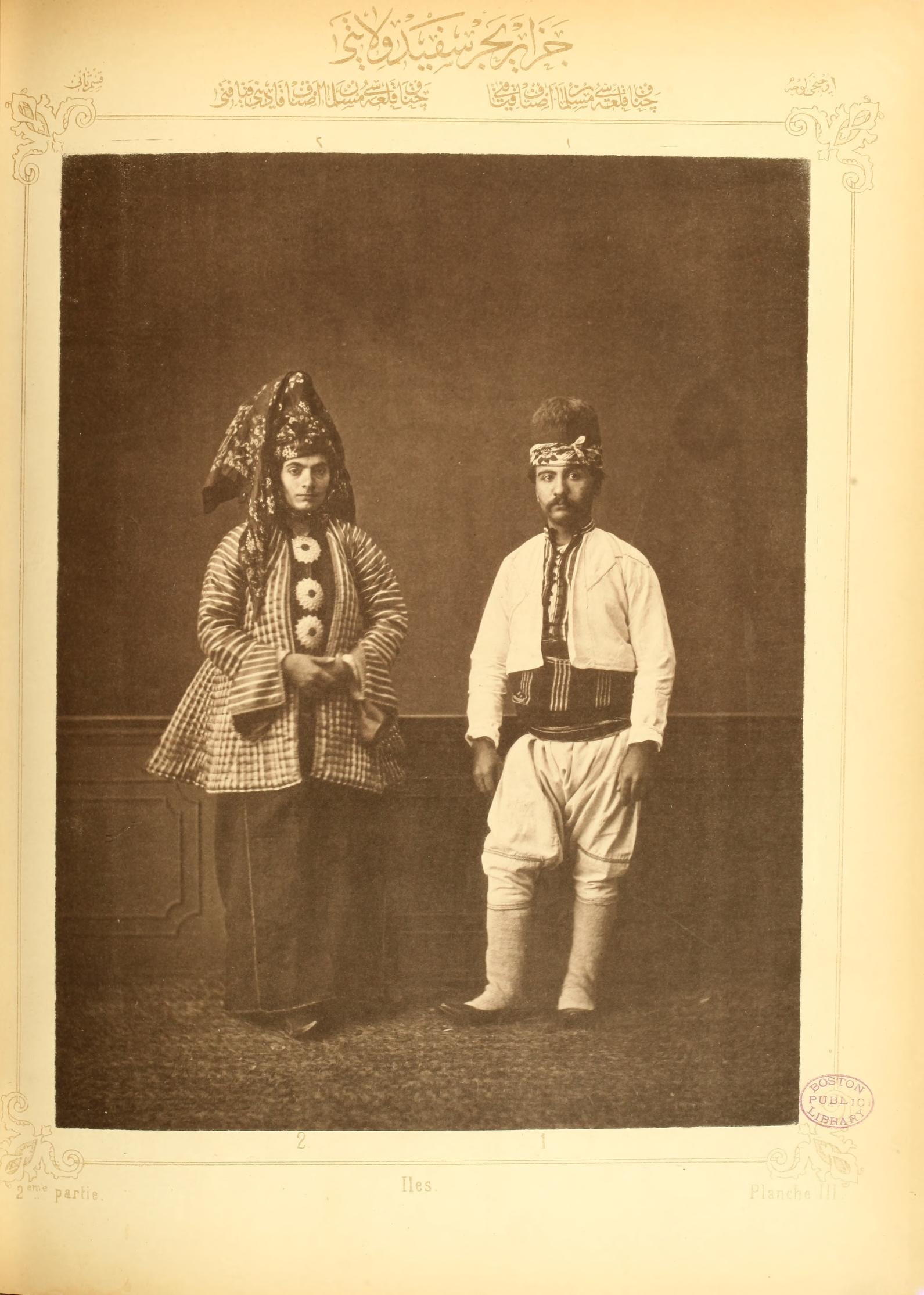
1. Muslim Artisan man and woman from Çanakkale

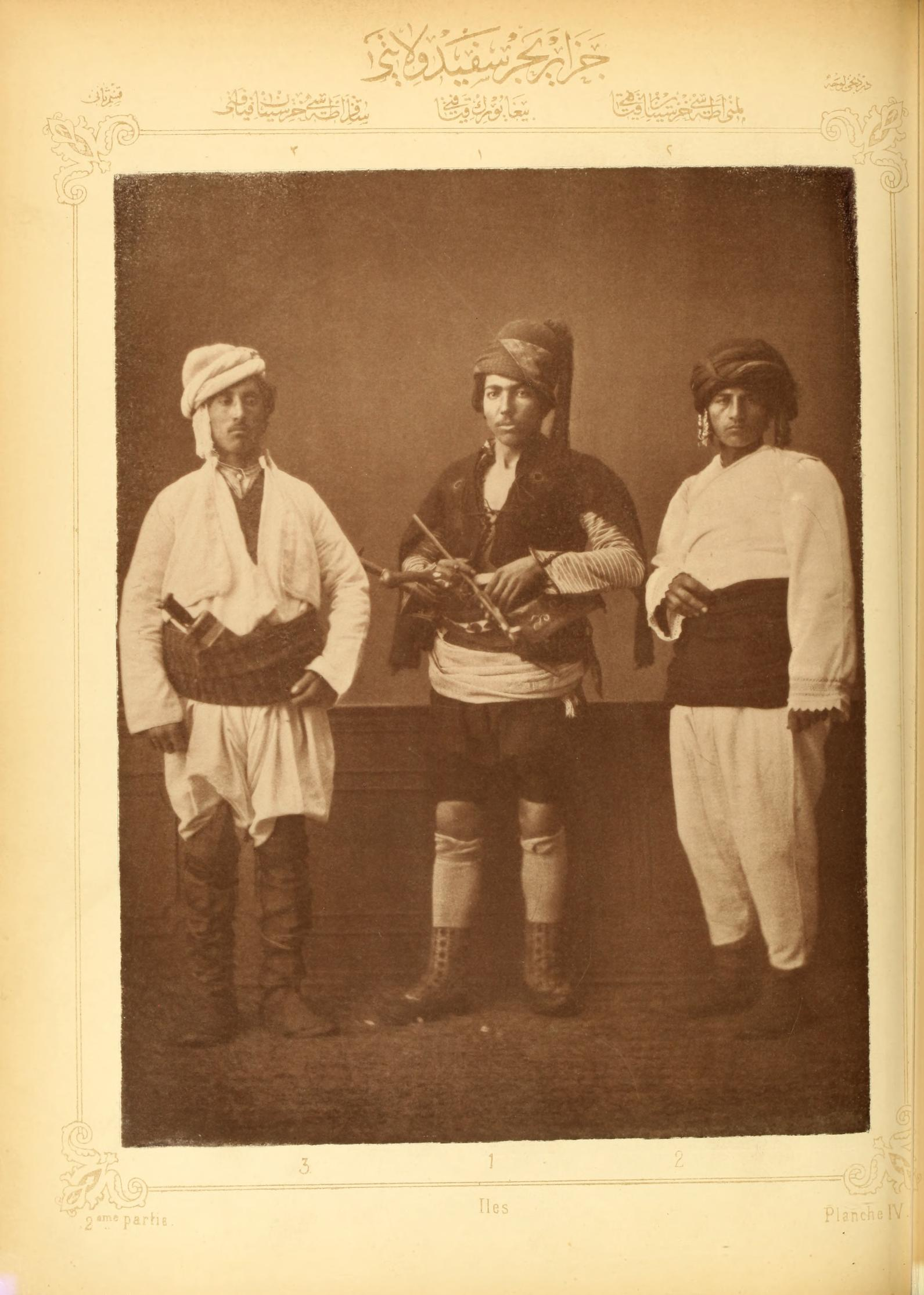
1. Yorouk (nomad) from Biga
2. Christian inhabitant of Chios
3. Christian from Lemnos

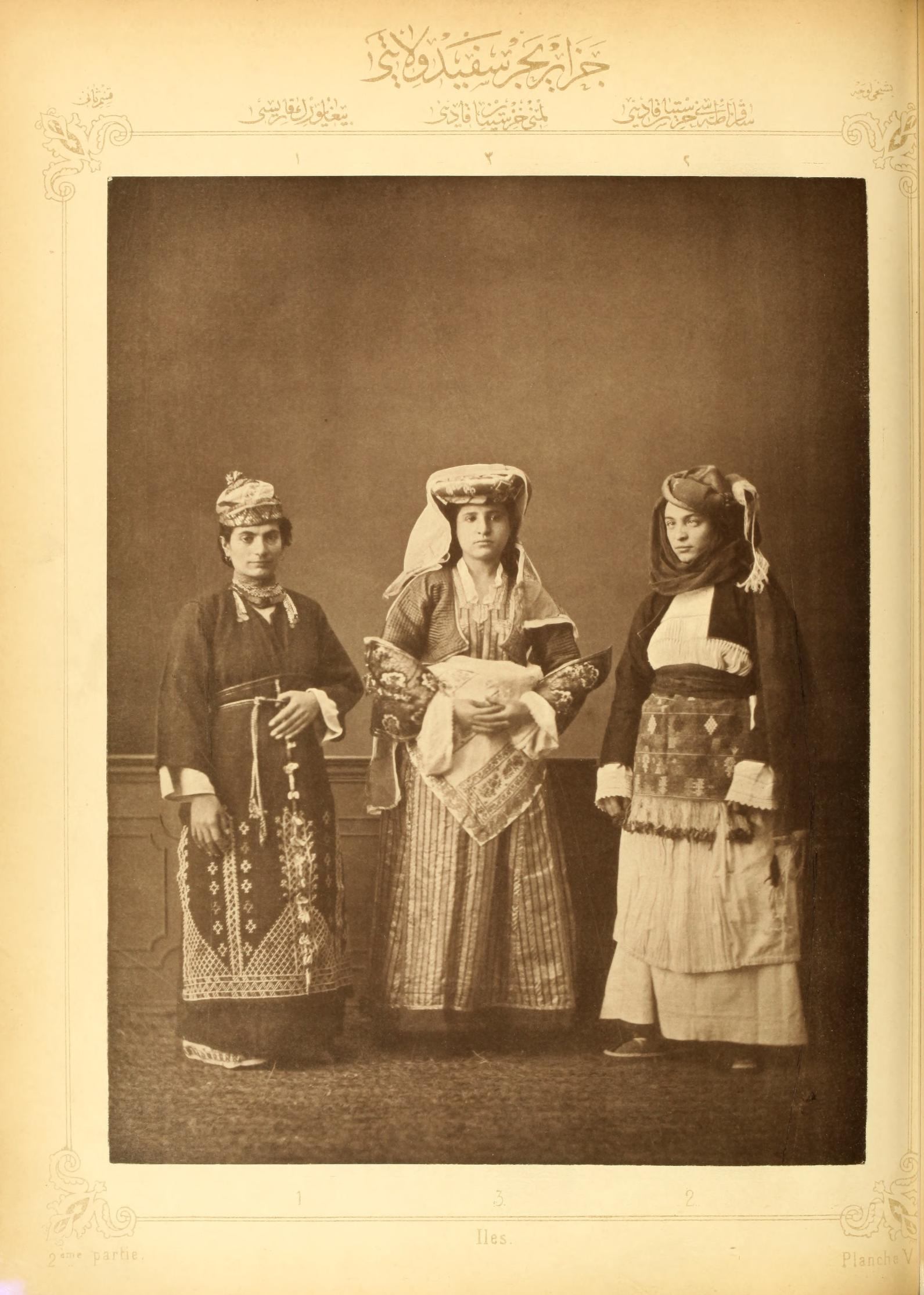
1. Yorouk woman from Biga
2. Christian woman from Chios
3. Christian woman from Lemnos

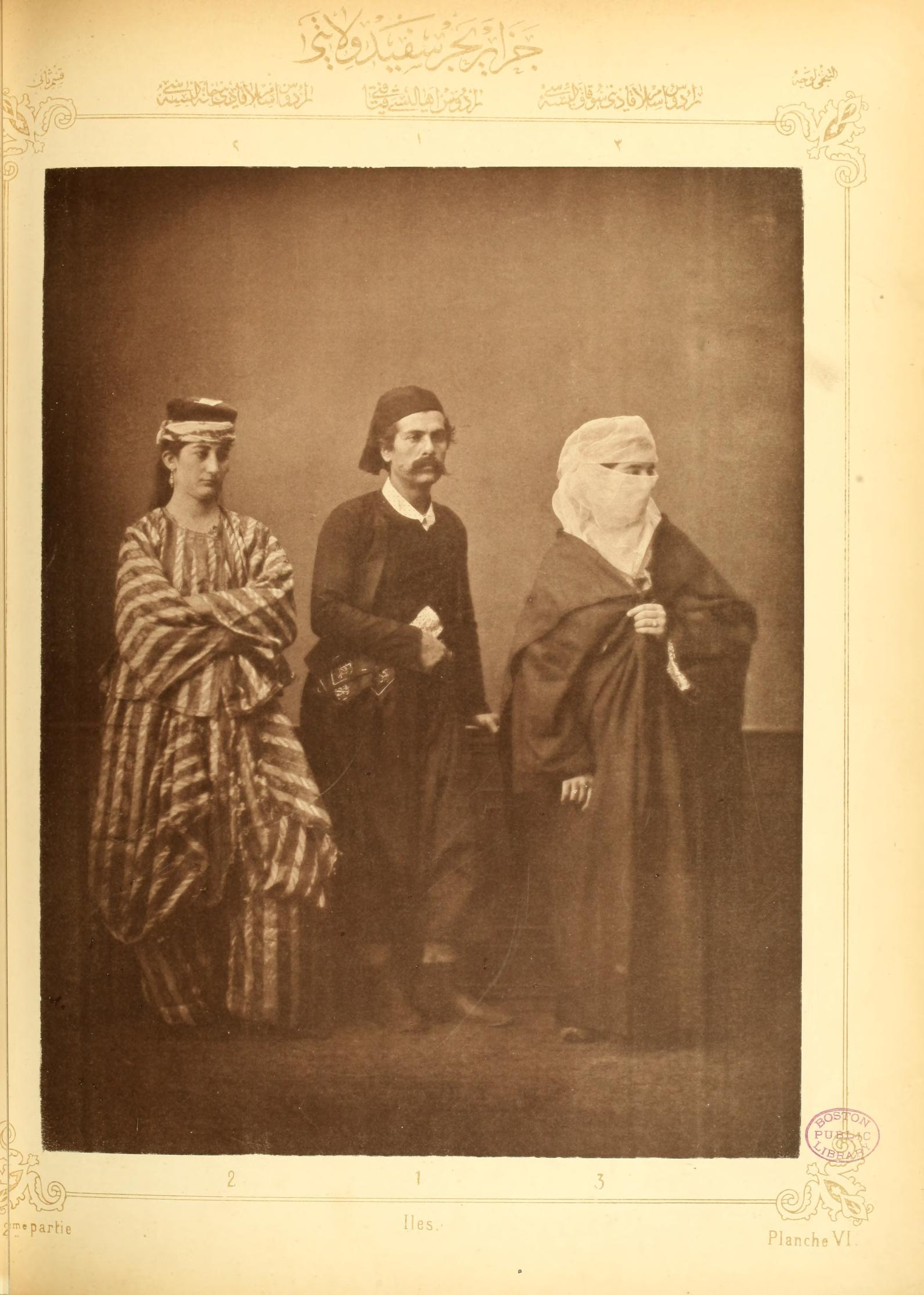
1. Muslim from Rhodes
2. Muslim lady from Rhodes

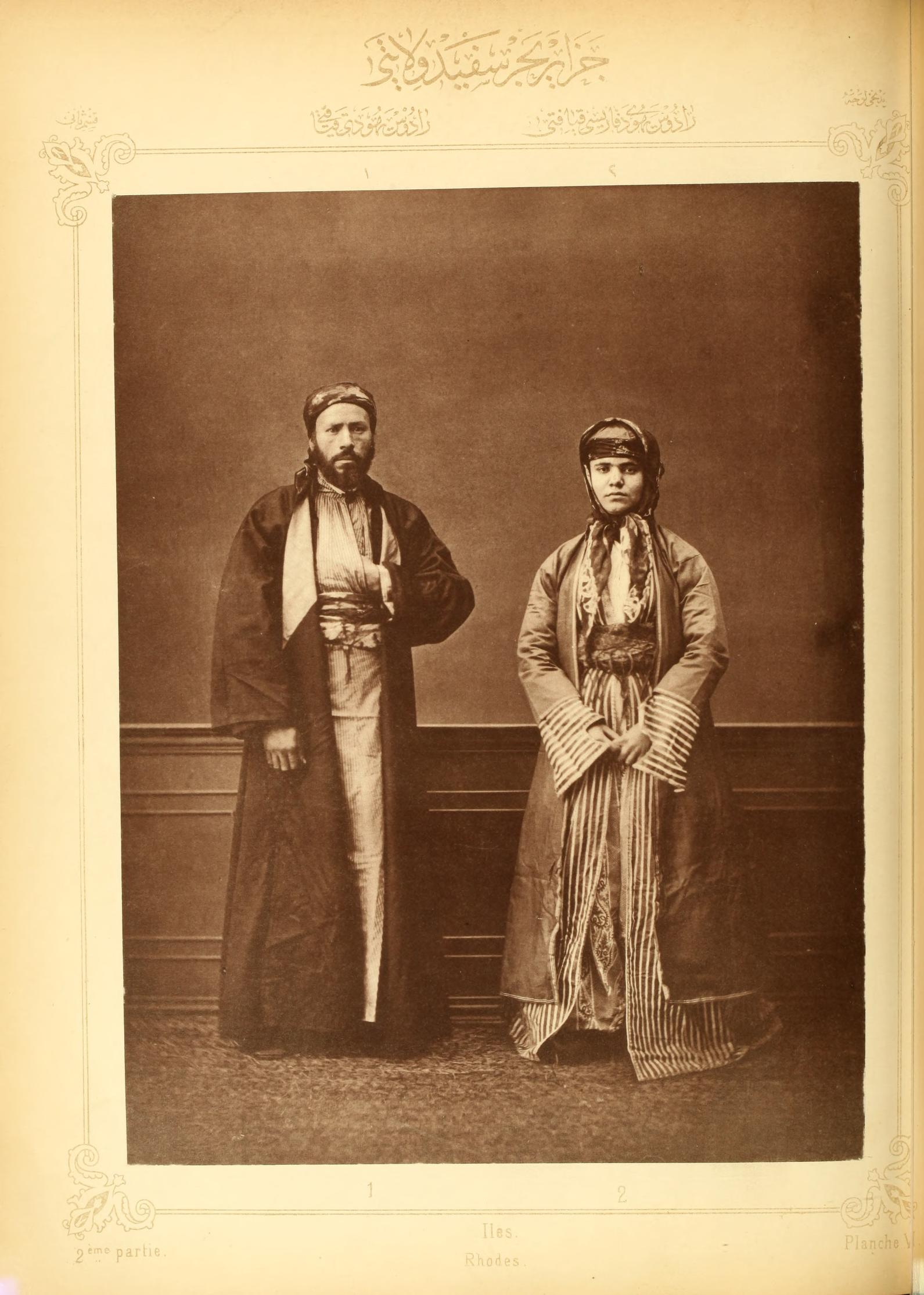
1. Jew from Rhodes
2. Jewish woman from Rhodes

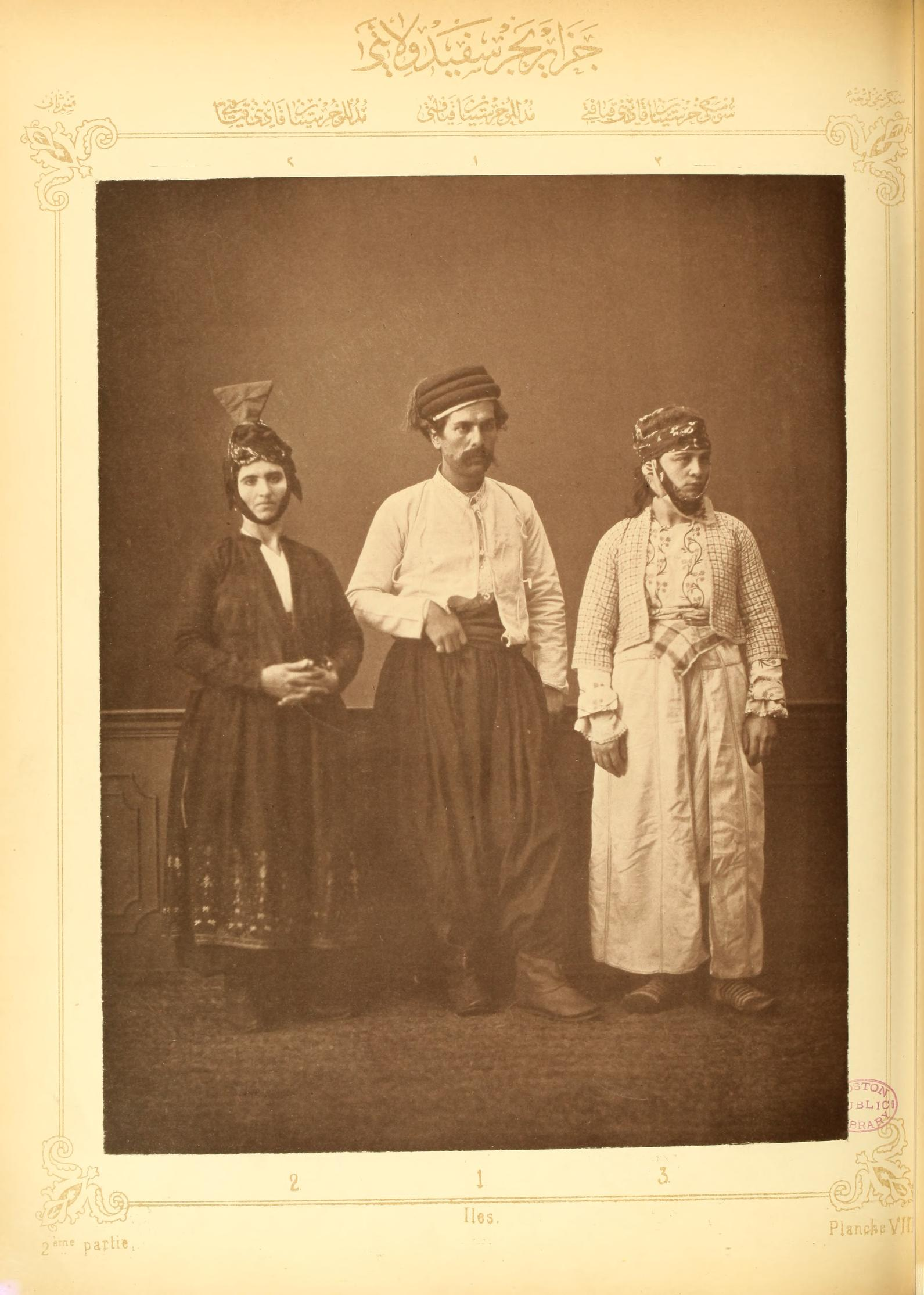
1. Christian inhabitant of Lesbos
2. Christian woman from Lesbos
3. Christian woman from Symi

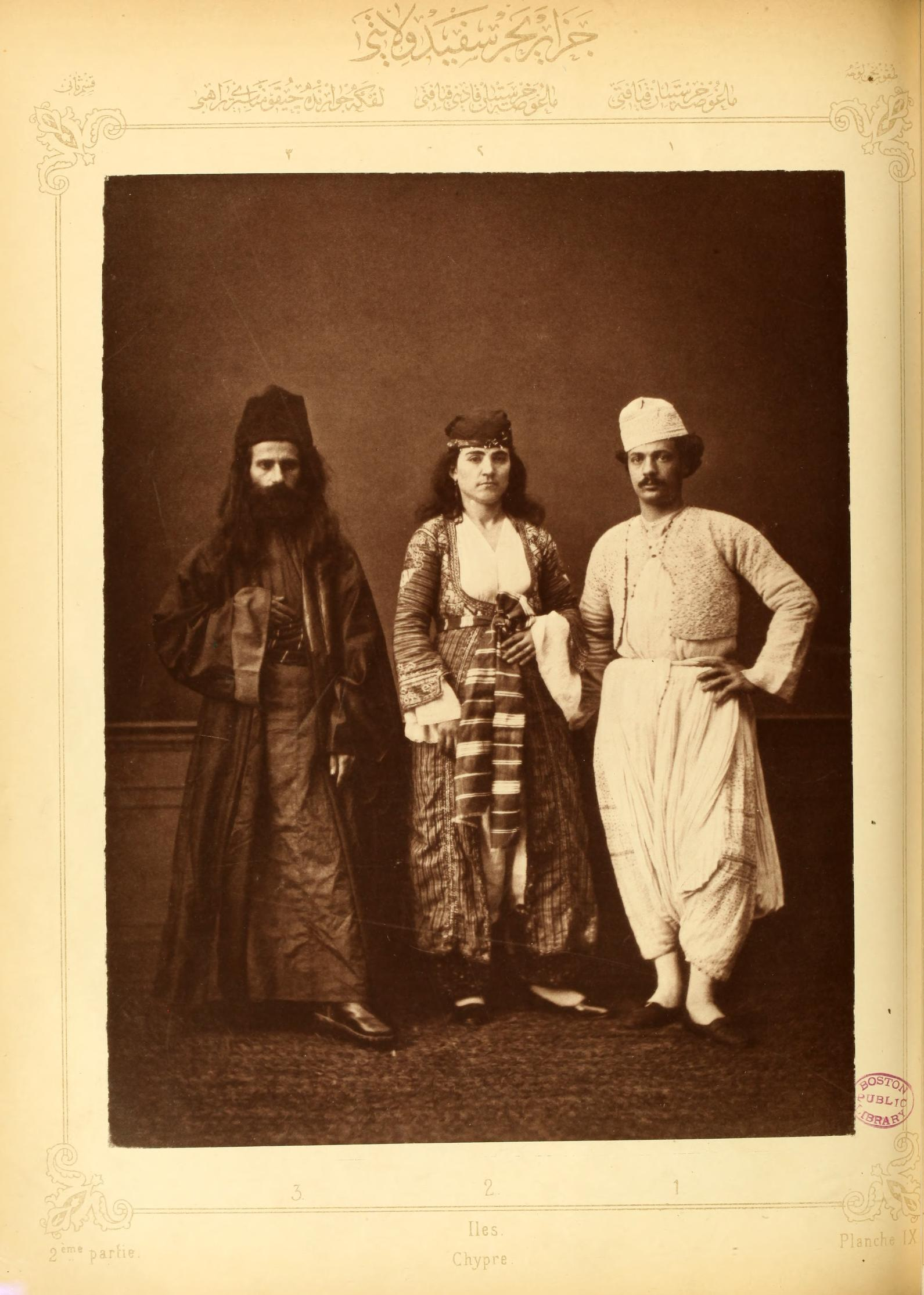
1. Christian inhabitant of Famagusta
2. Christian woman from Famagusta
3. Greek religious man of the Tchiko Monastery, near Lefka
- Vilayet of Hudavendigar
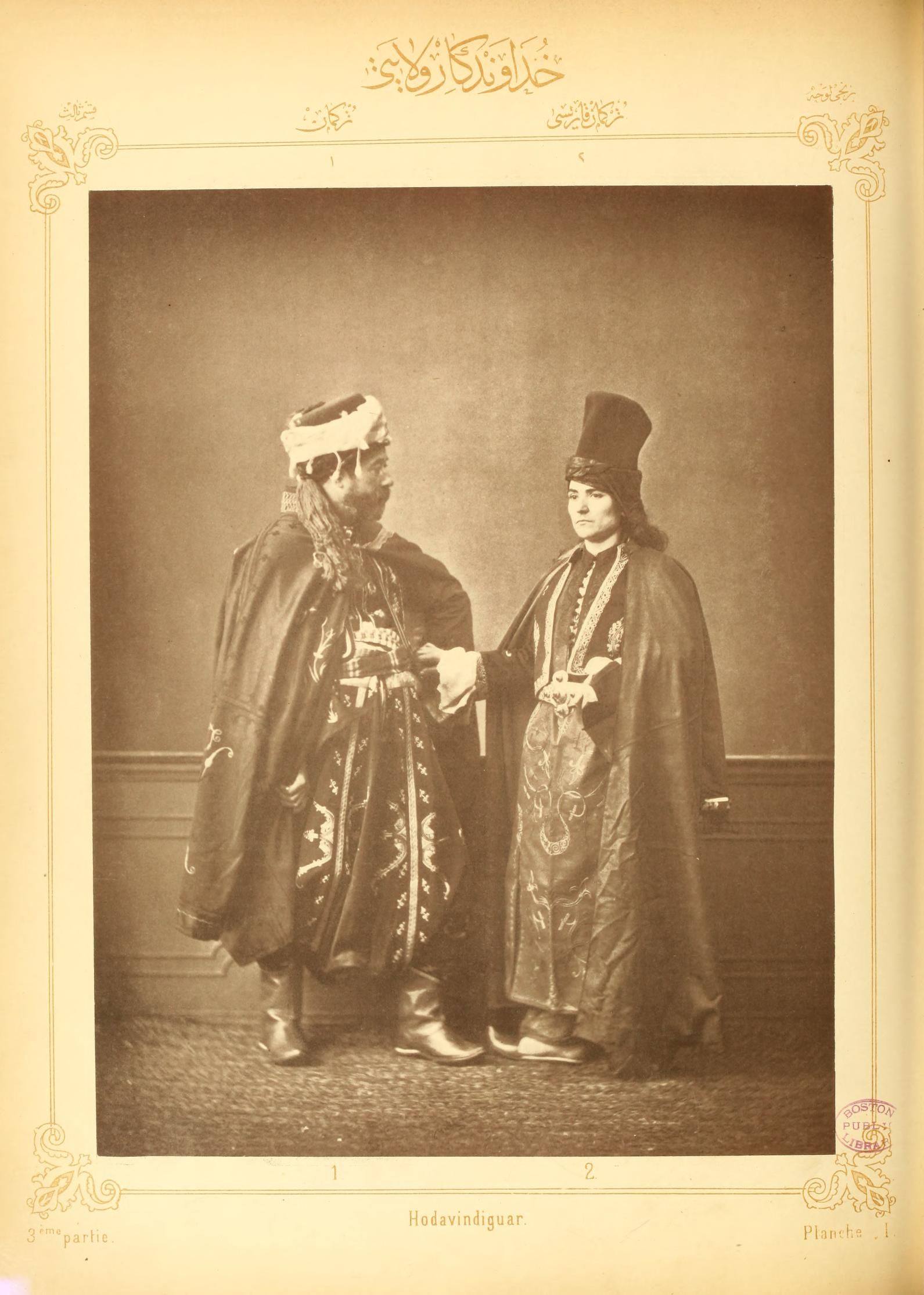
1. Turkmen from around Bursa

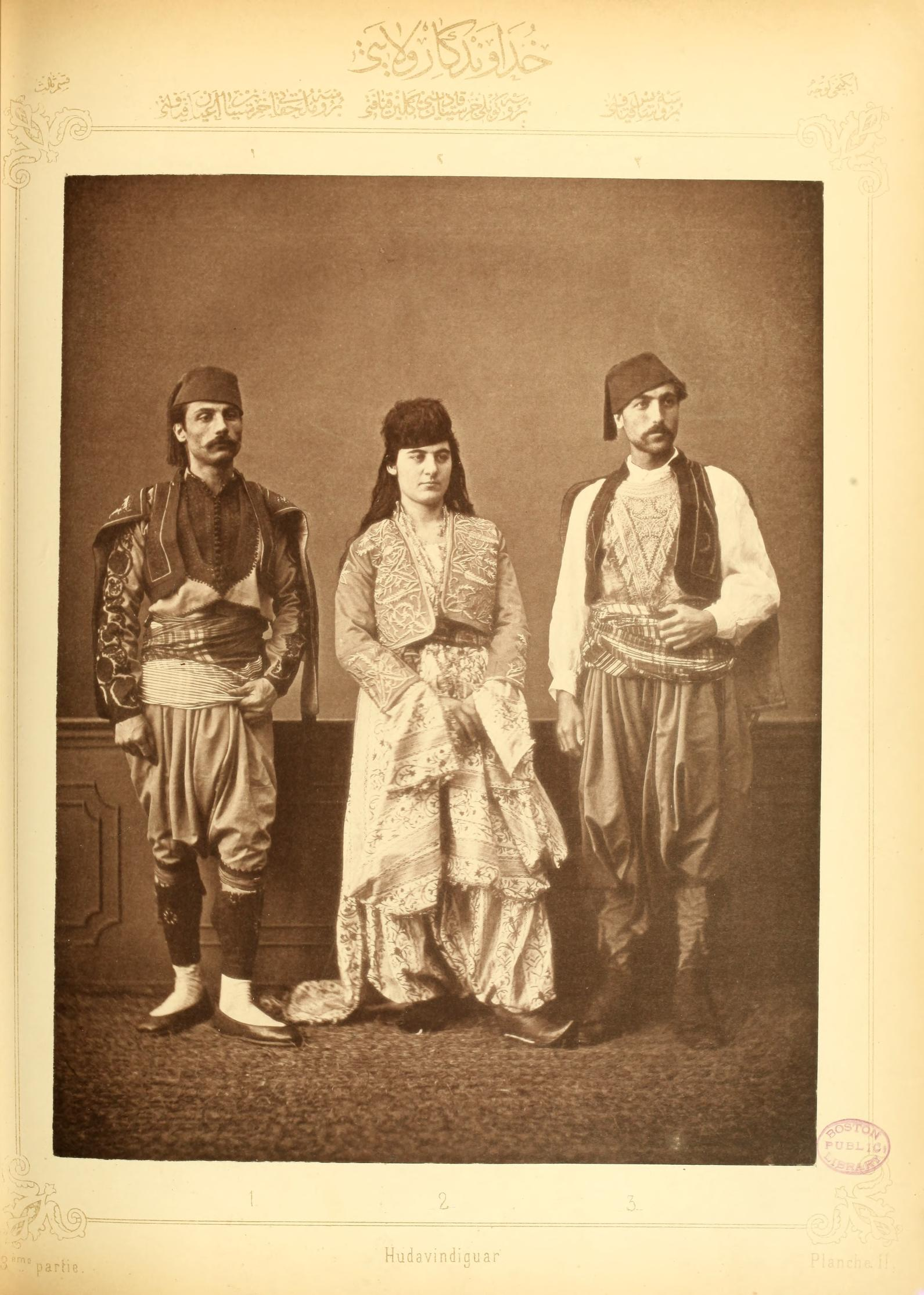
1. Peasant man and woman from around Bursa (wearing wedding clothing)
2. Seis (horse groom)

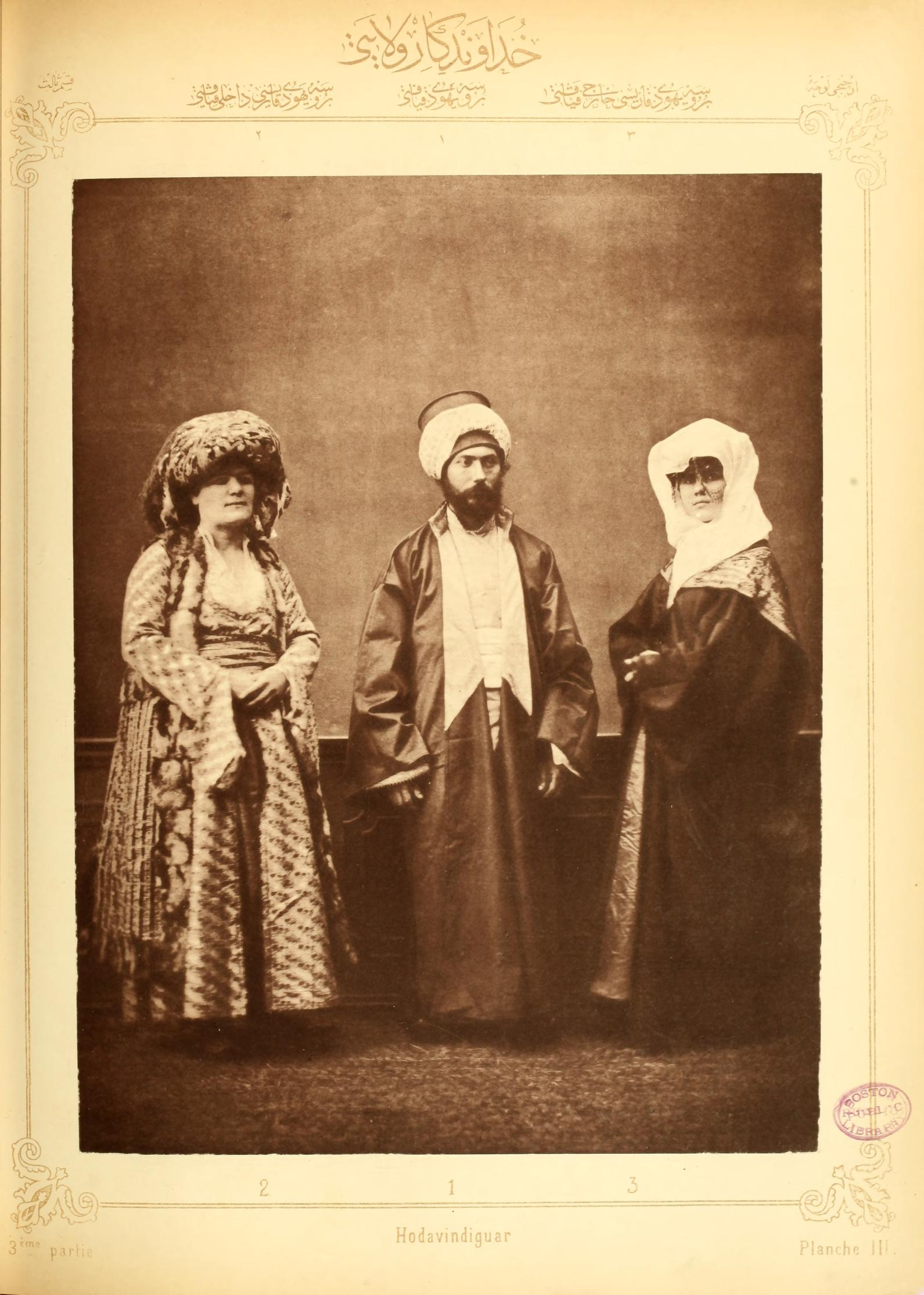
1. Jew and Jewish woman from Bursa
- Vilayet of Aydın
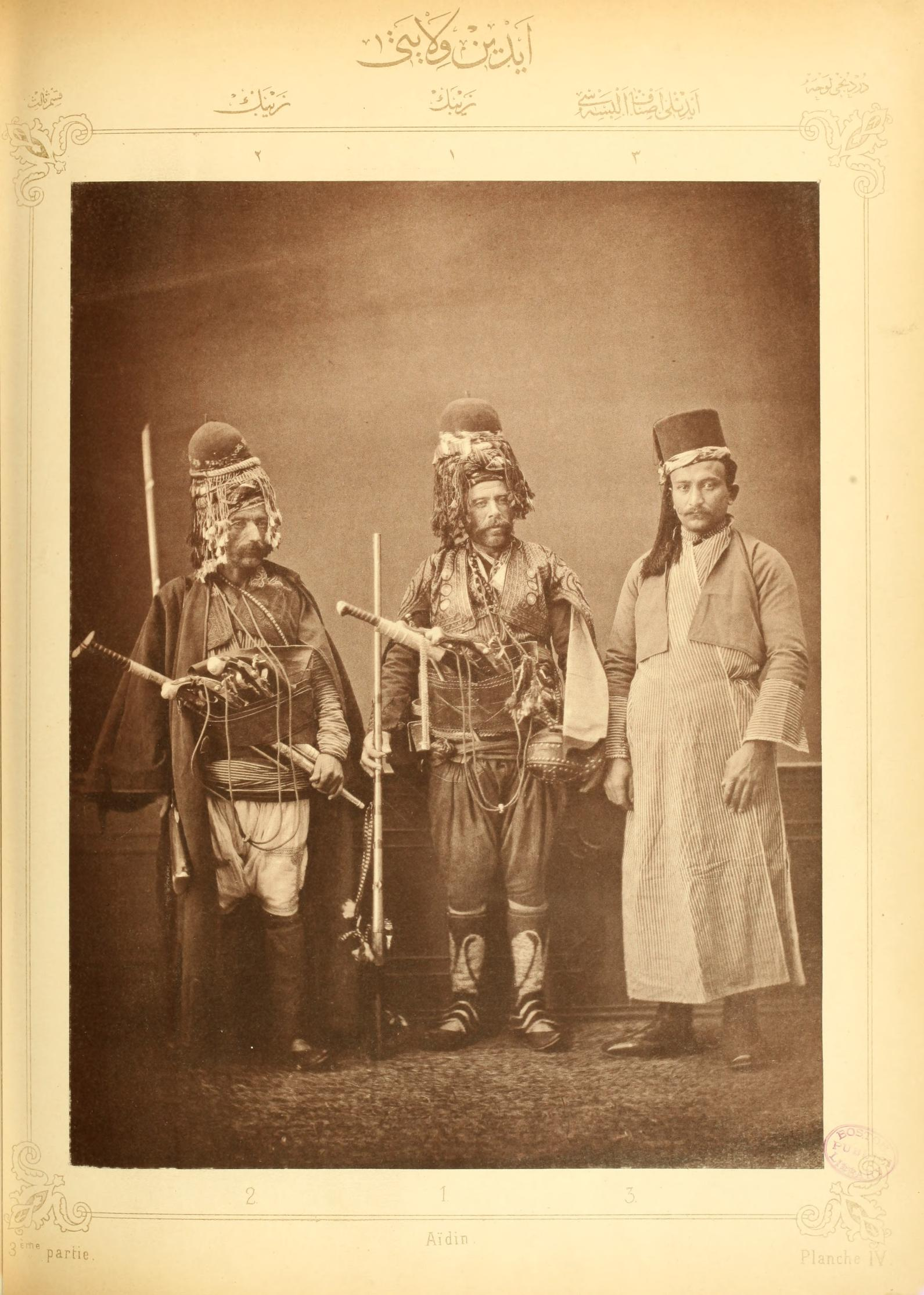
1. Zeibek
2. Artisan from Aydın

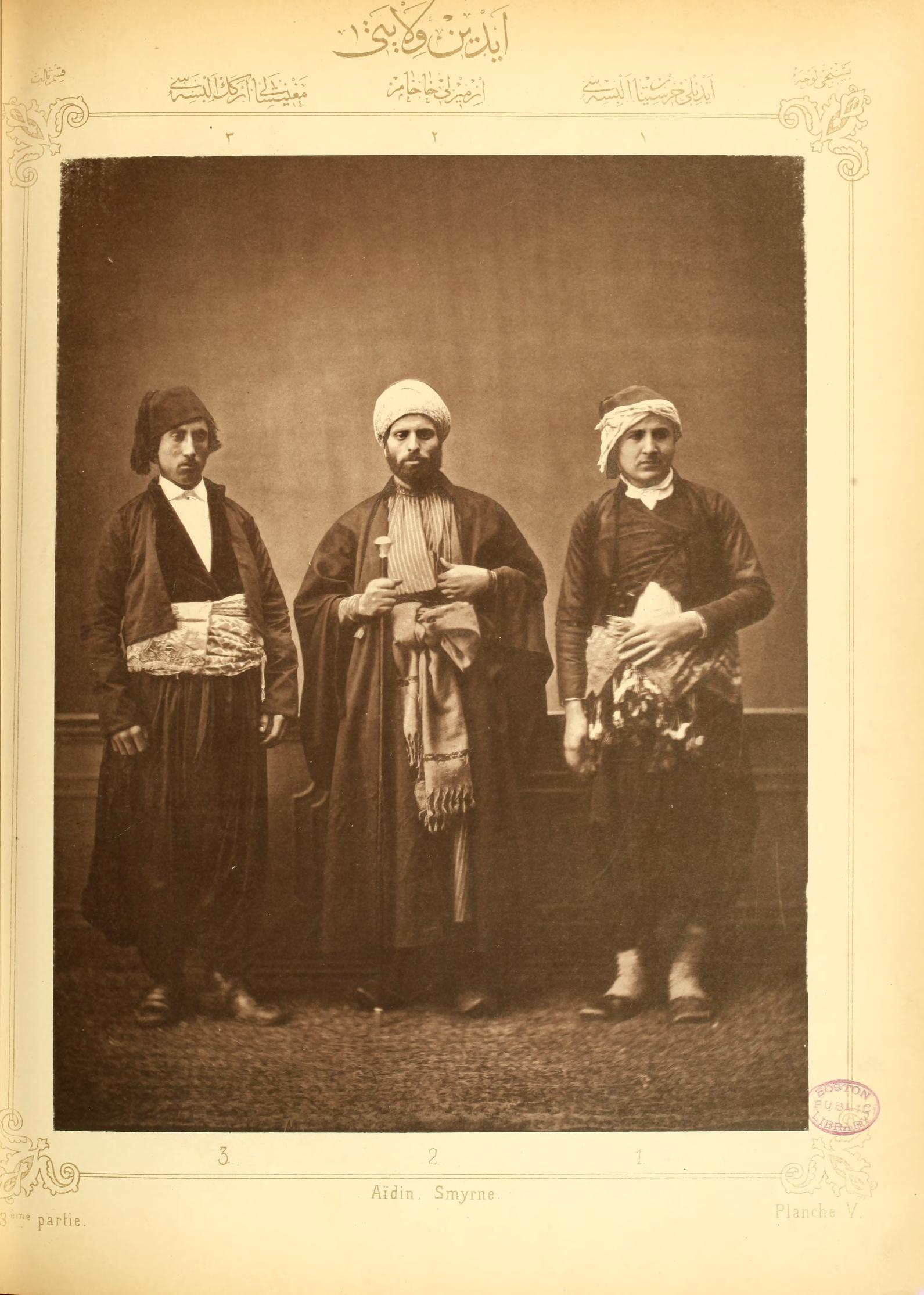
1. Christian merchant from Aydın
2. Haham from İzmir
3. Burgher from Manisa

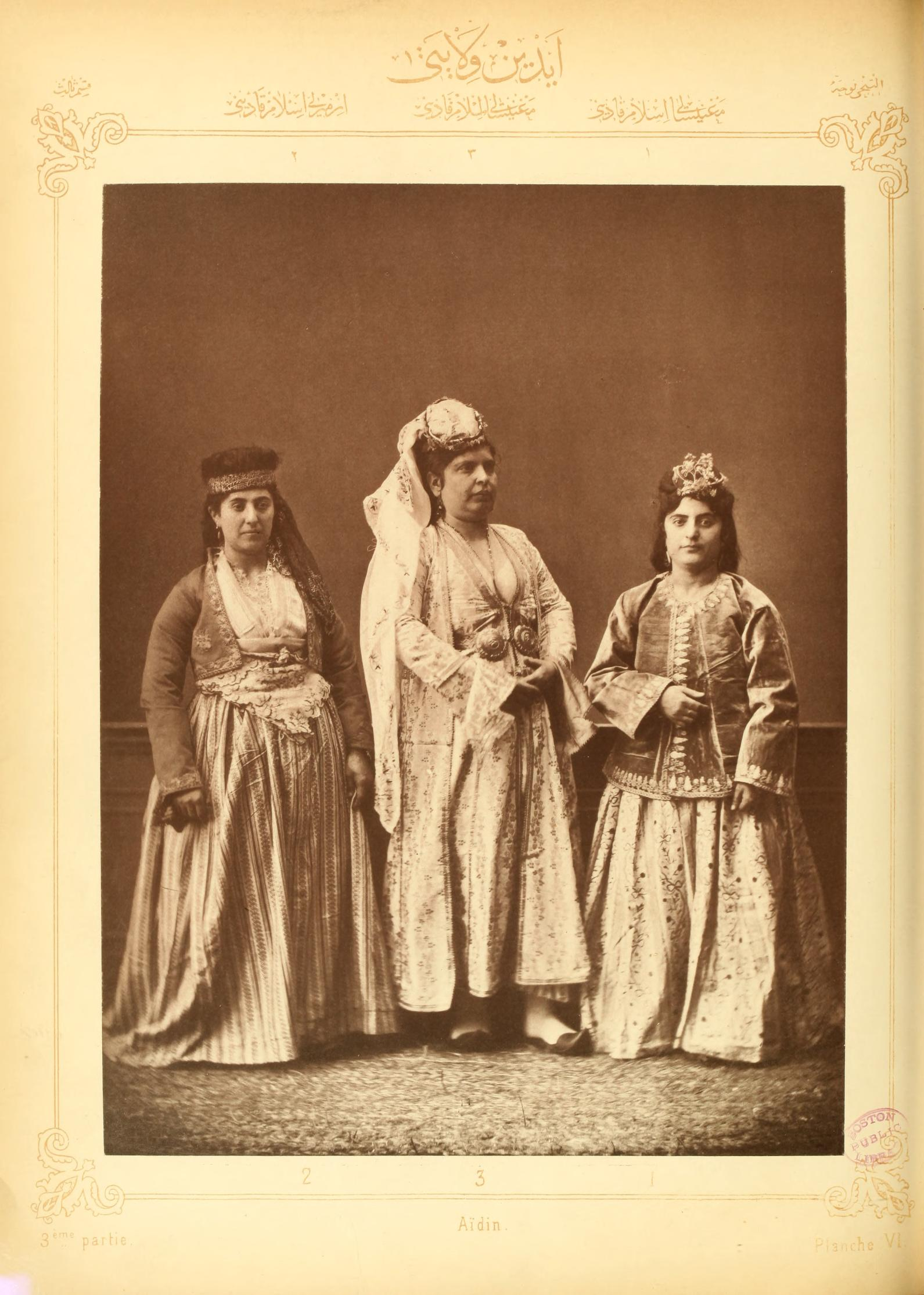
1. Muslim lady from Manisa
2. Muslim lady from İzmir
- Vilayet of Konia
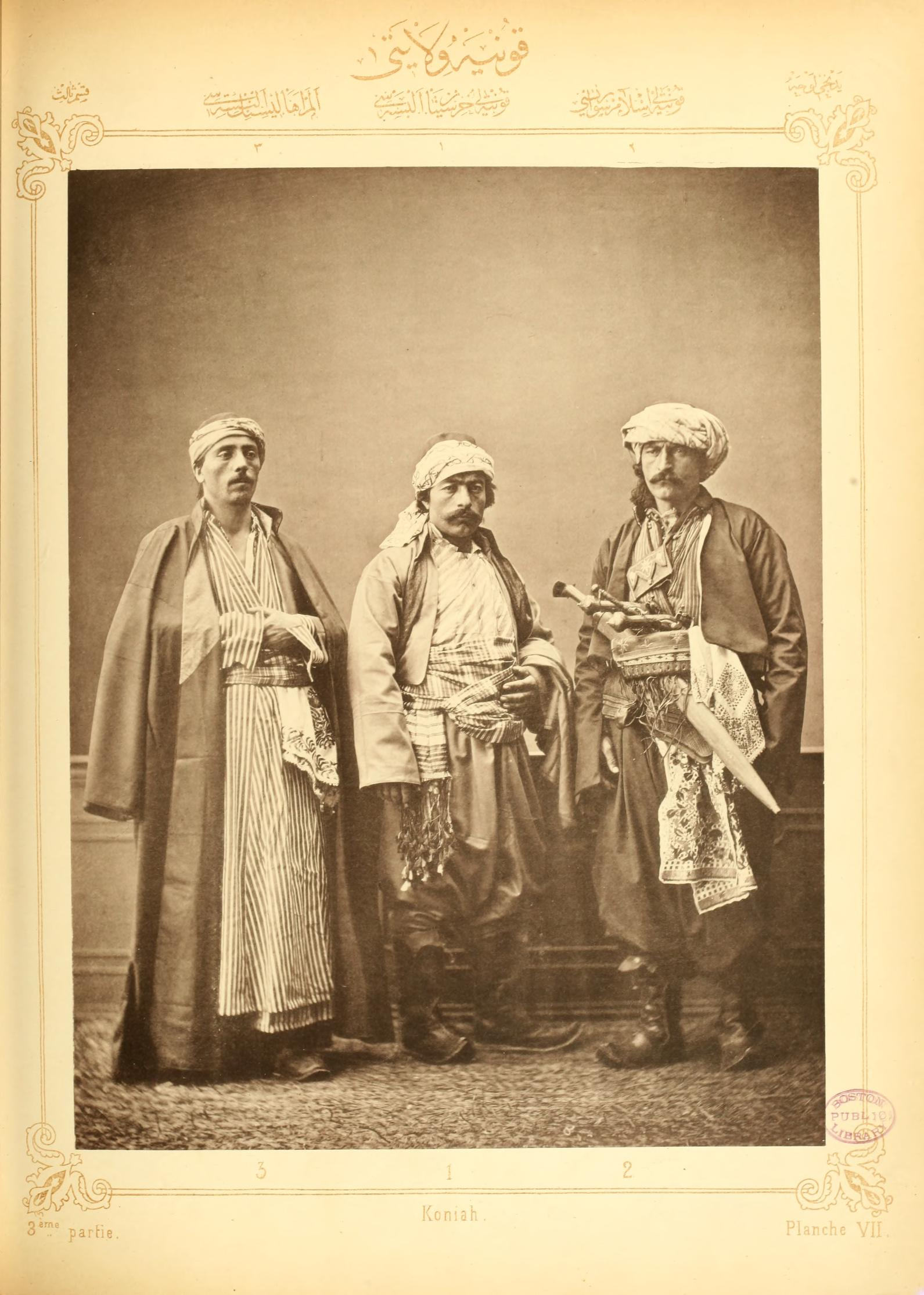
1. Christian from Konya
2. Muslim horseman from Konya
3. Inhabitant of Elmalı

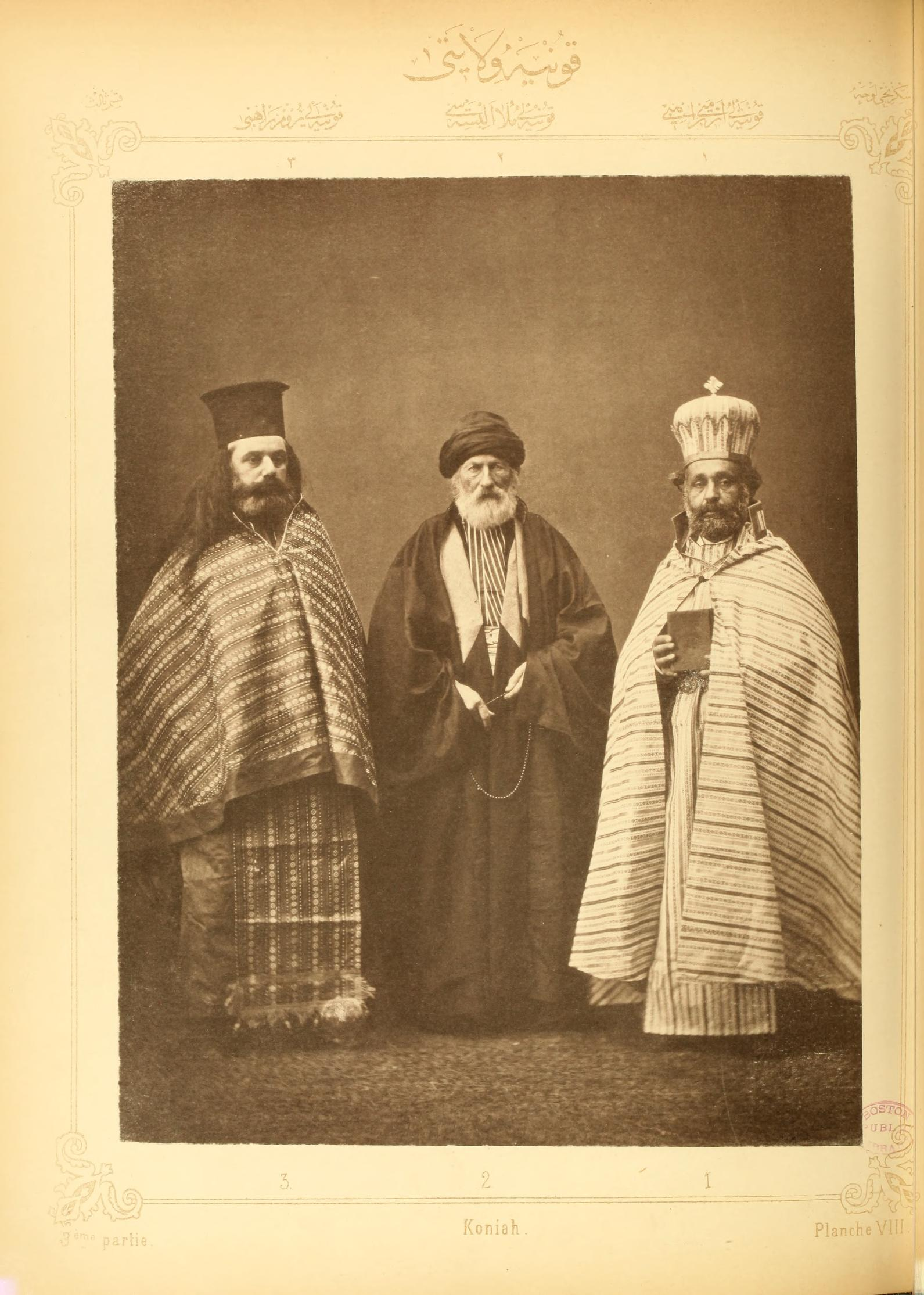
1. Armenian Priest from Konya
2. Mullah from Konya
3. Greek Priest from Konya

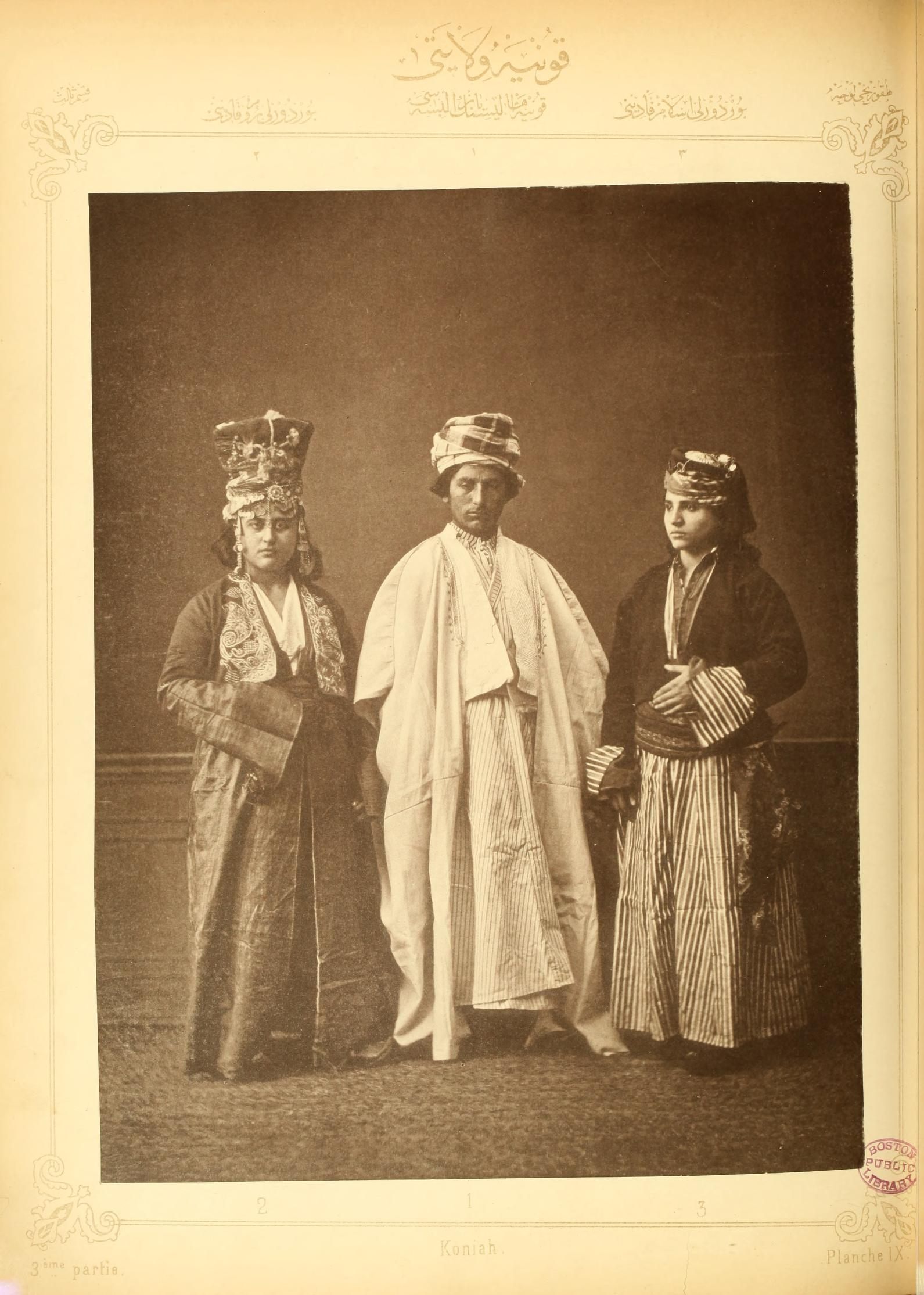
1. Burgher from Konya
2. Greek woman from Burdur
3. Muslim woman from Burdur

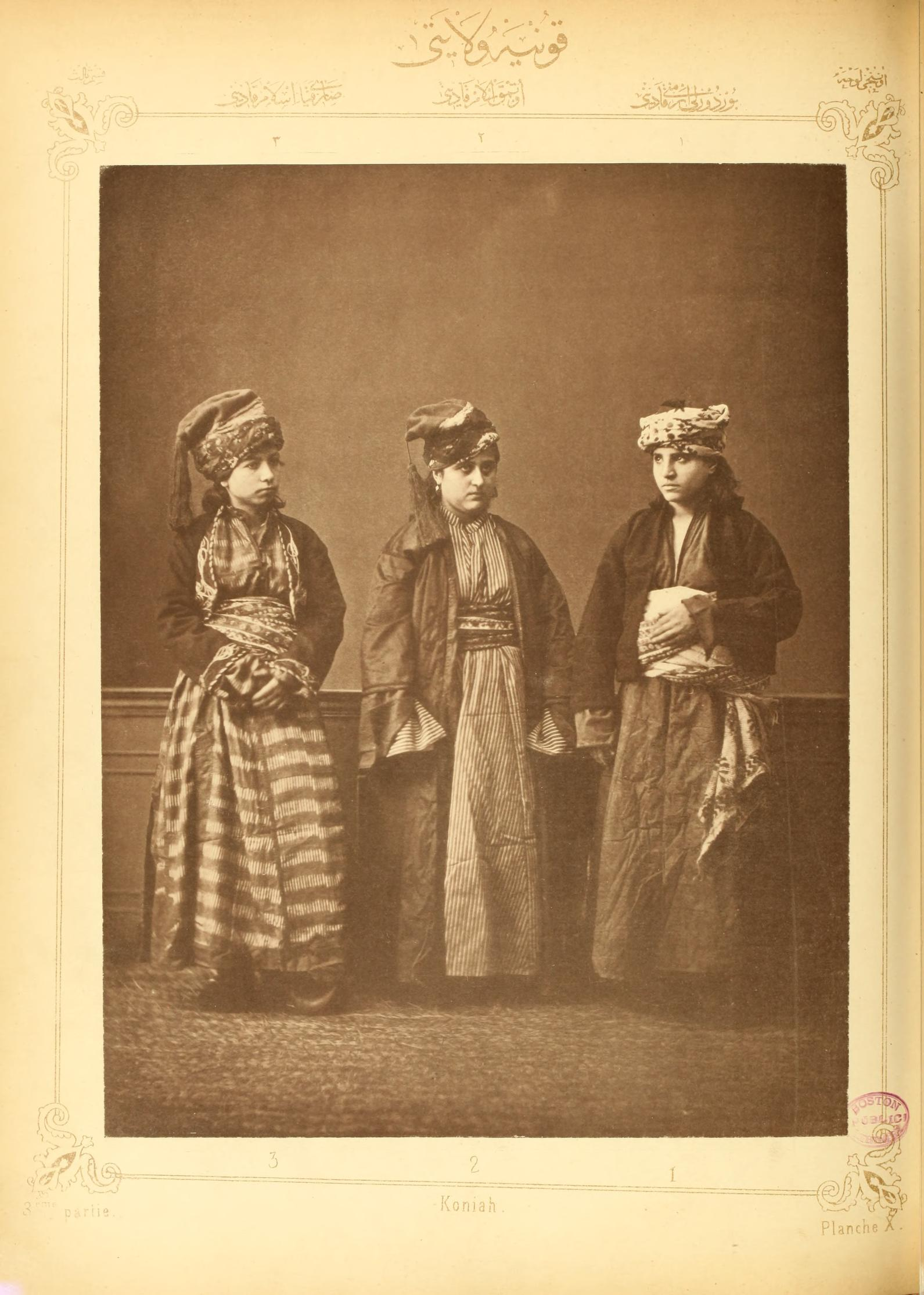
1. Armenian woman from Burdur
2. Turkmen woman from Karie de Outmouk
3. Kurdish woman from Sarıkaya
- Vilayet of Ankara
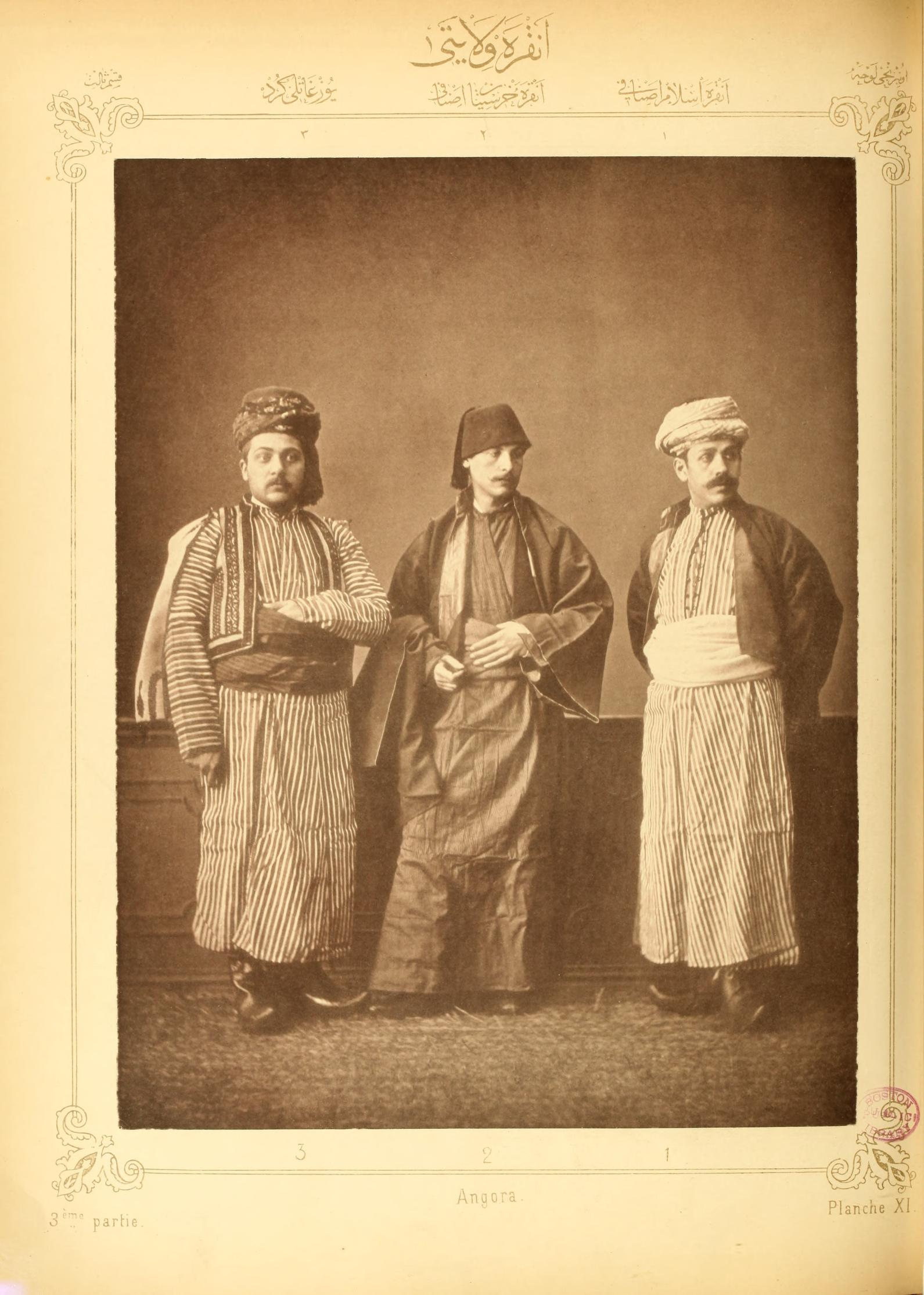
1. Muslim Artisan from Ankara
2. Christian Artisan from Ankara
3. Kurd from around Yozgat

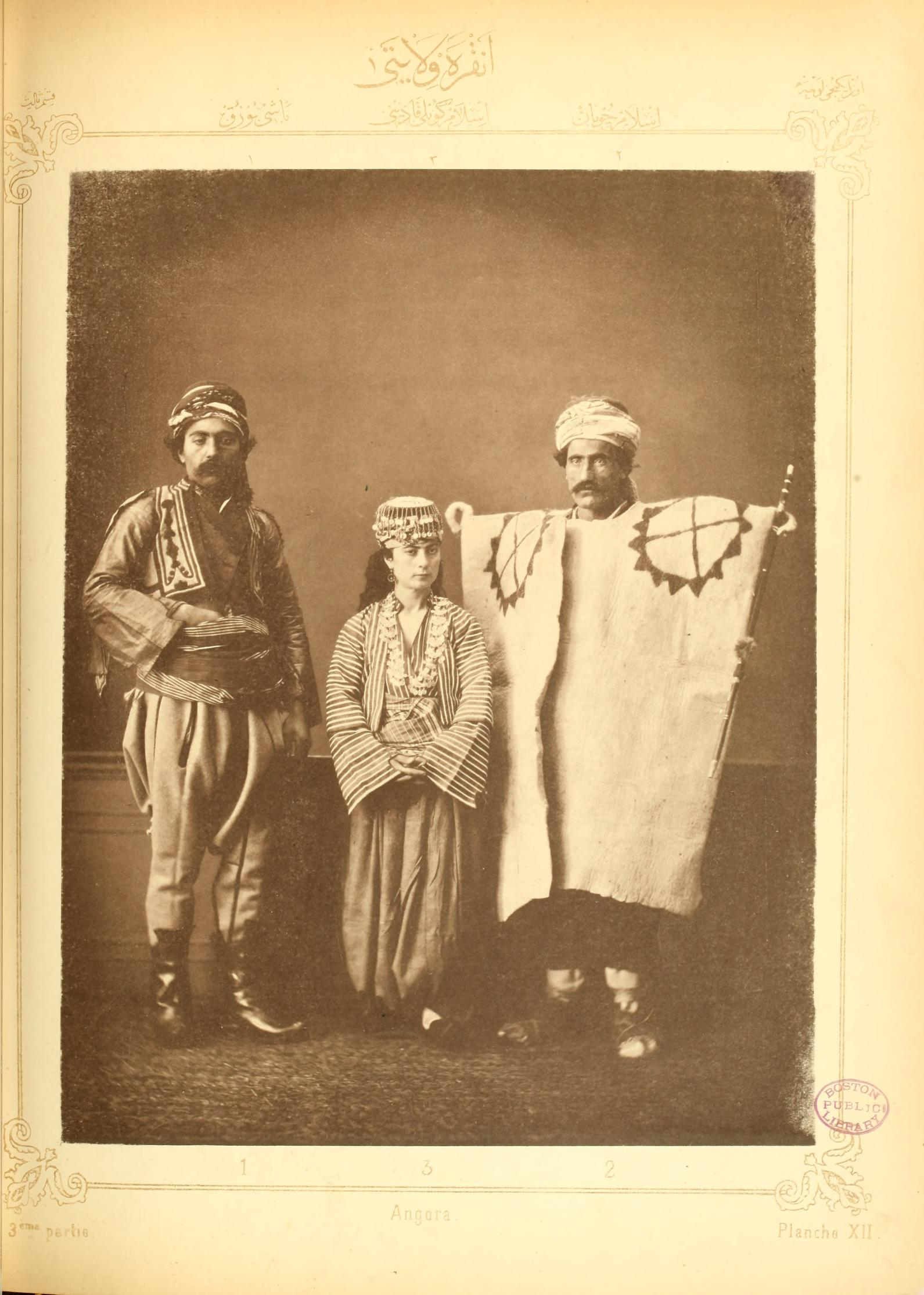
1. Bashi-bazouk from Ankara
2. Muslim peasant from around Ankara
3. Muslim peasant woman from around Ankara

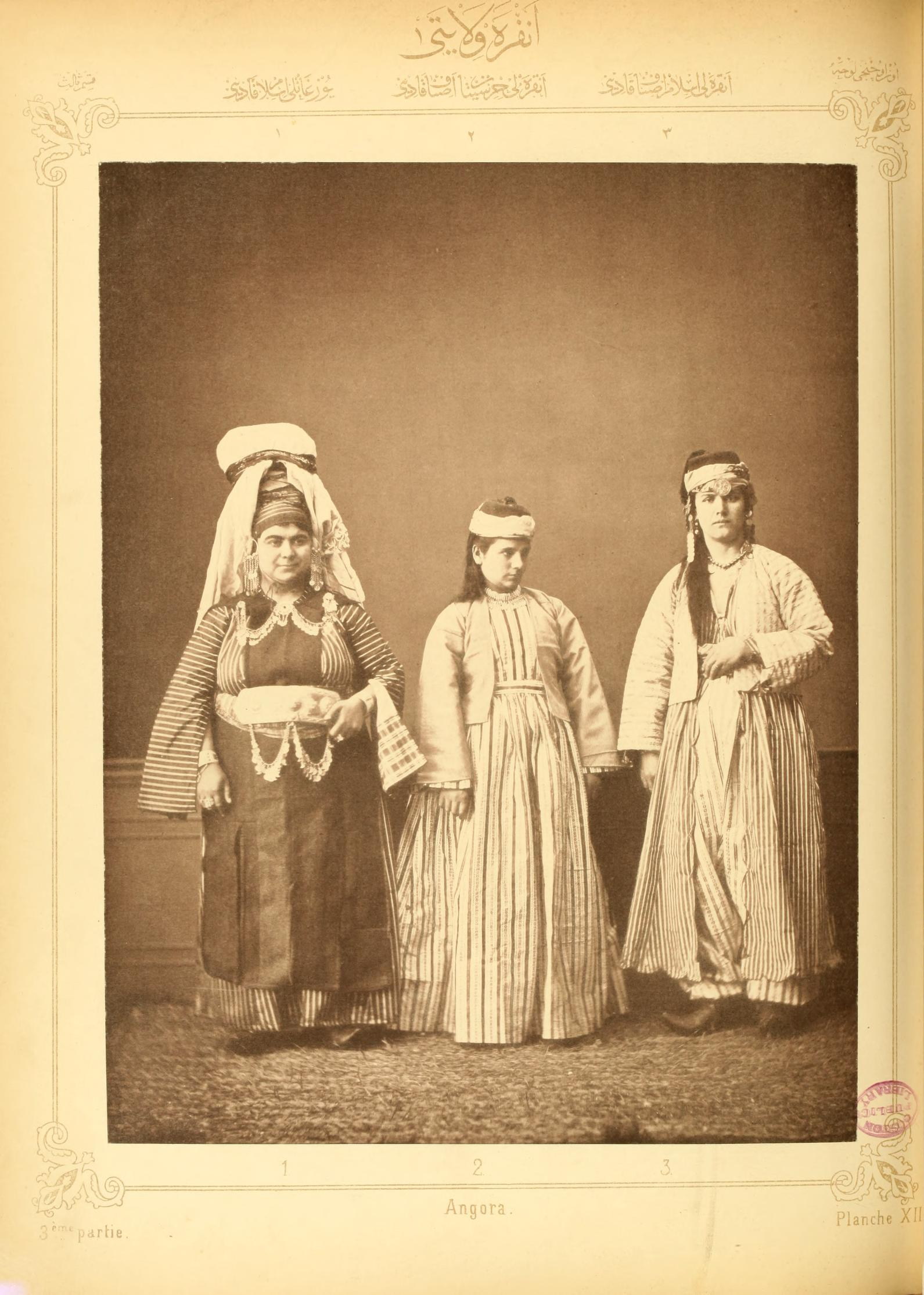
1. Kurdish woman from around Yozgat
2. Female Christian artisan from Ankara
3. Muslim female artisan from Ankara
- Vilayet of Kastamonu
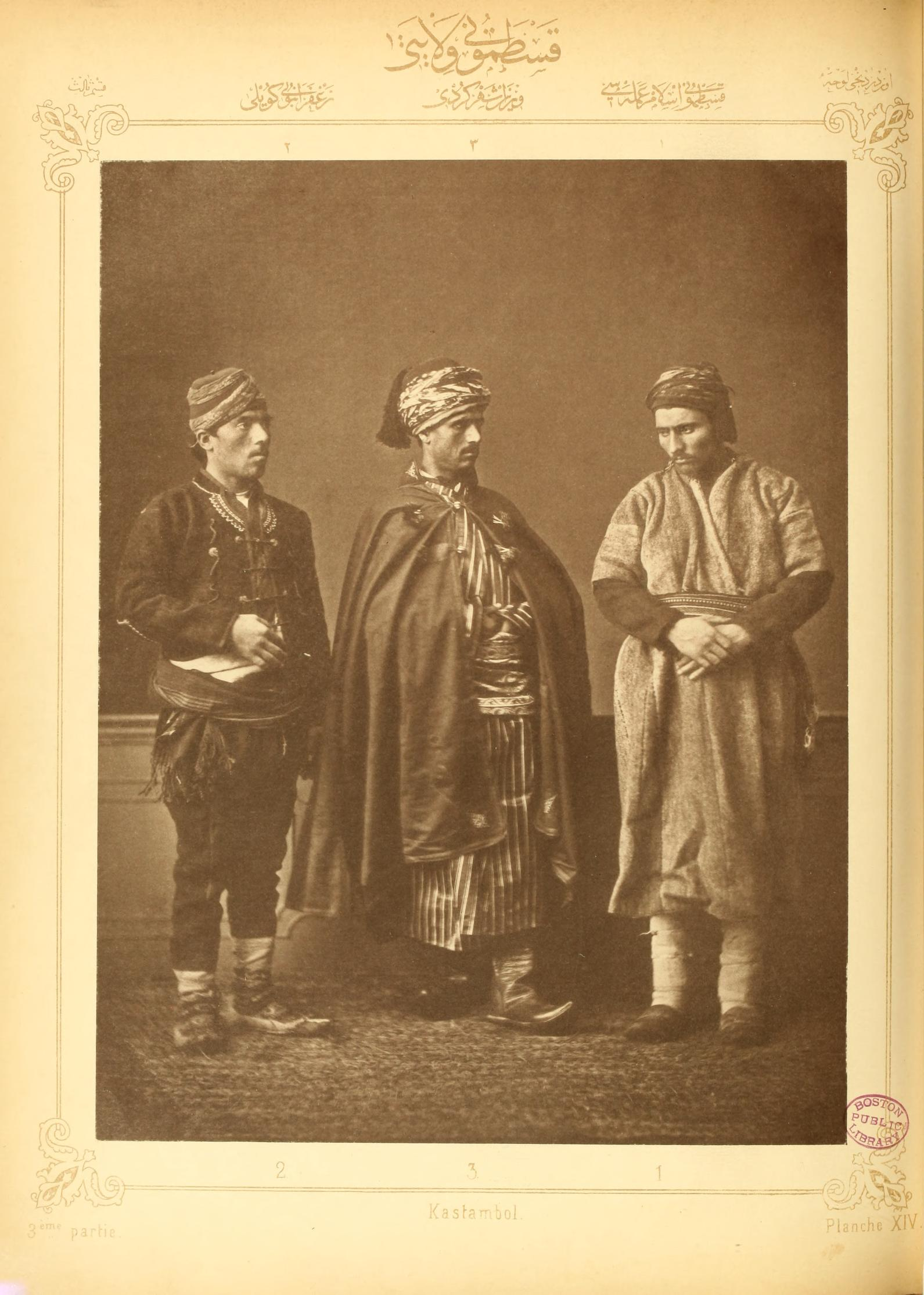
1. Turkish worker from Kastamonu
2. Peasant from Safranbolu
3. Kurd from Viranşehir
- Vilayet of Sivas
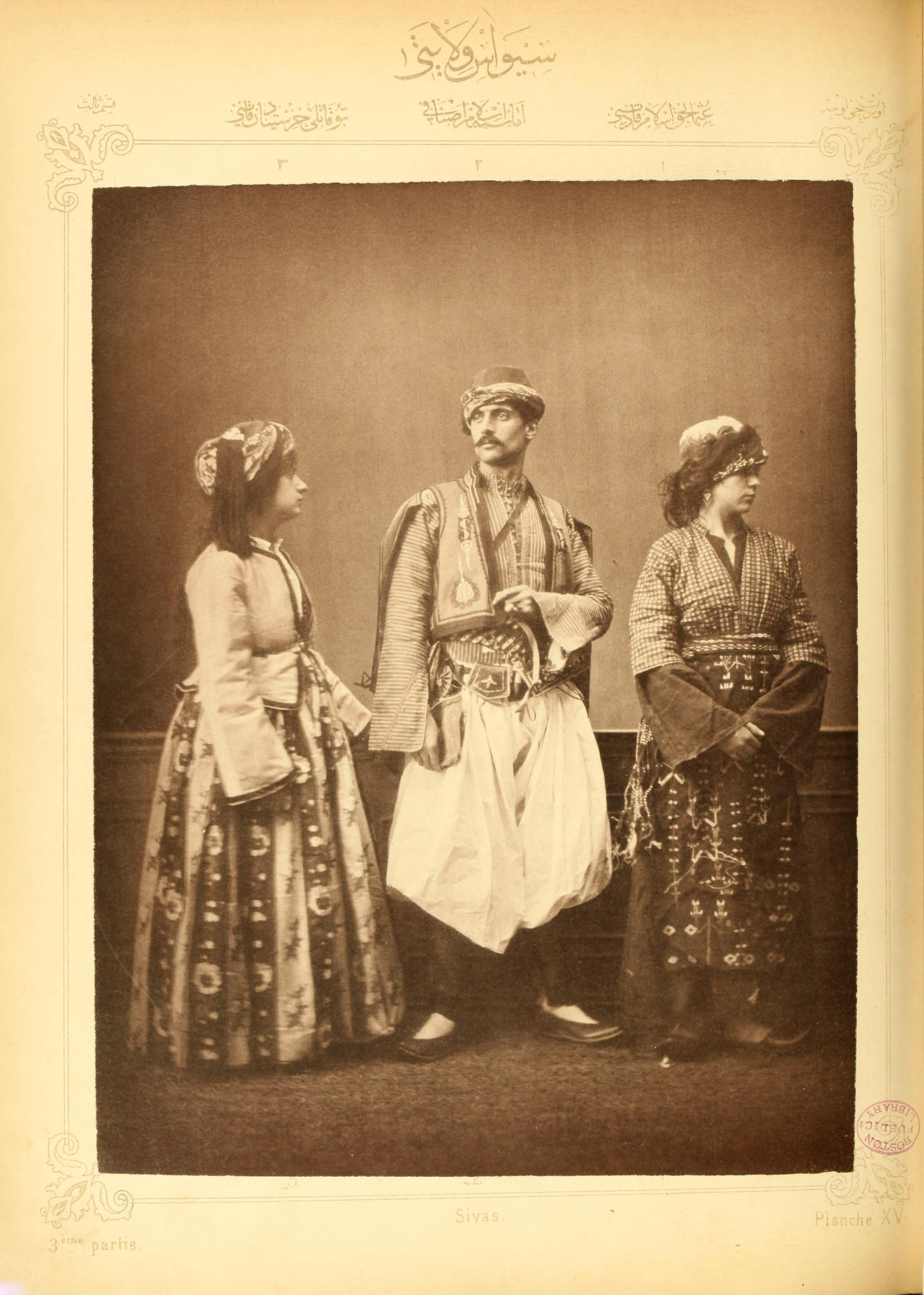
1. Turkish woman from Osmancık
2. Muslim artisan from Amasya
3. Christian lady from Tokat

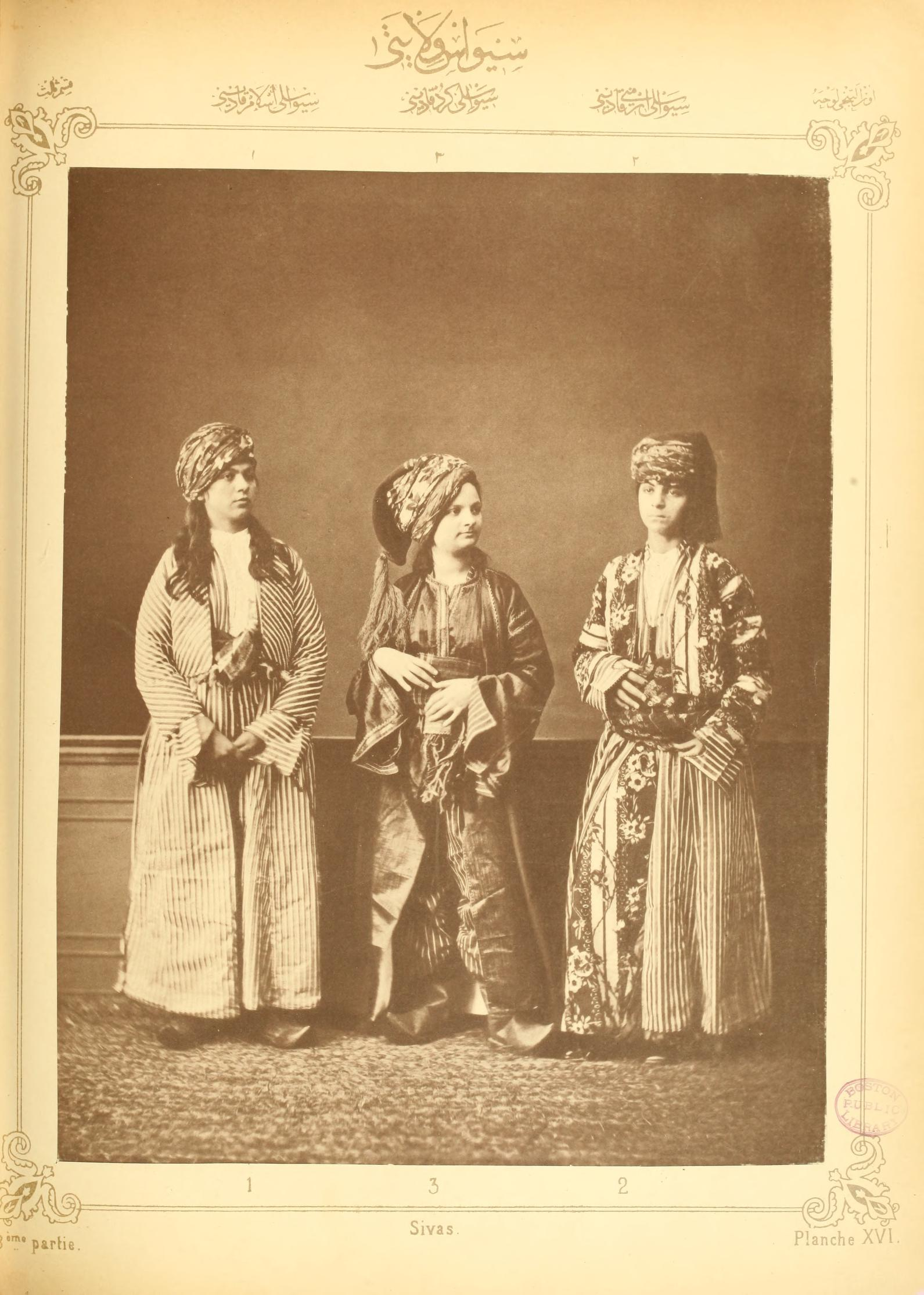
1. Muslim woman from Sivas
2. Armenian woman from Sivas
3. Kurdish woman from around Sivas
- Vilayet of Trebizond
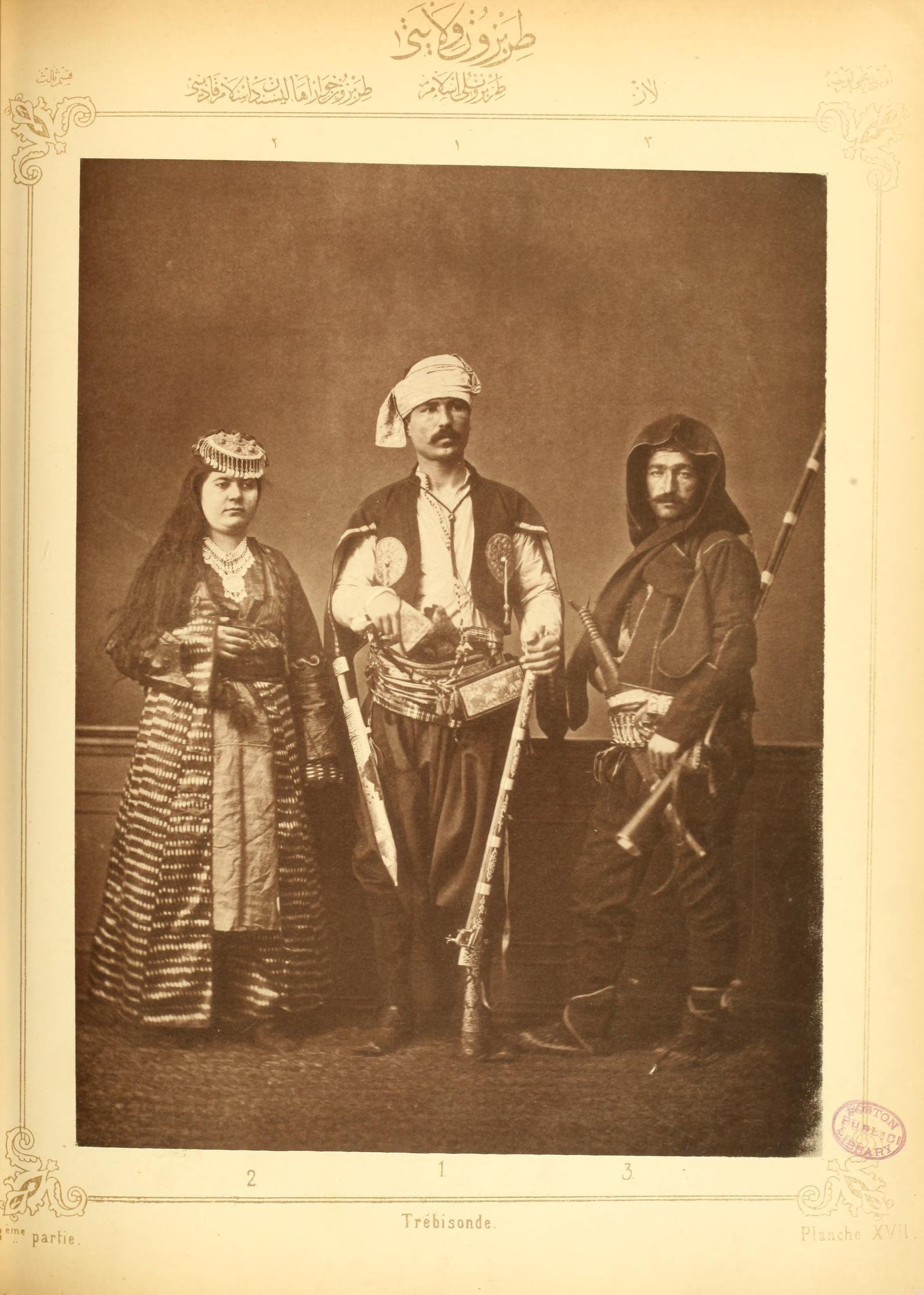
1. Muslim from Trabzon
2. Muslim peasant woman from around Trabzon
3. Laz man

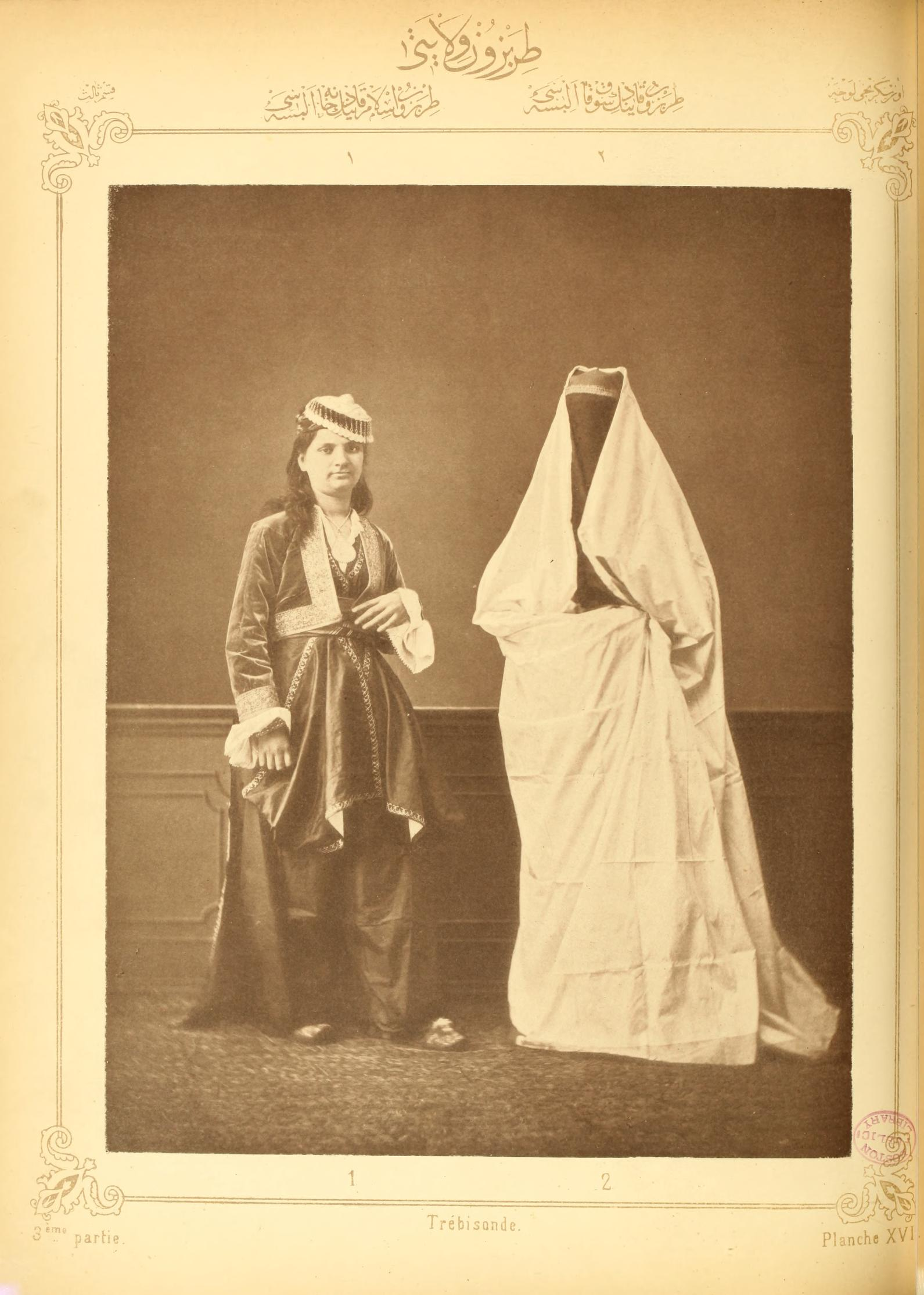
1. Muslim lady from Trabzon (indoor dress)
2. Muslim lady from Trabzon (outdoor dress)
- Vilayet of Erzerum
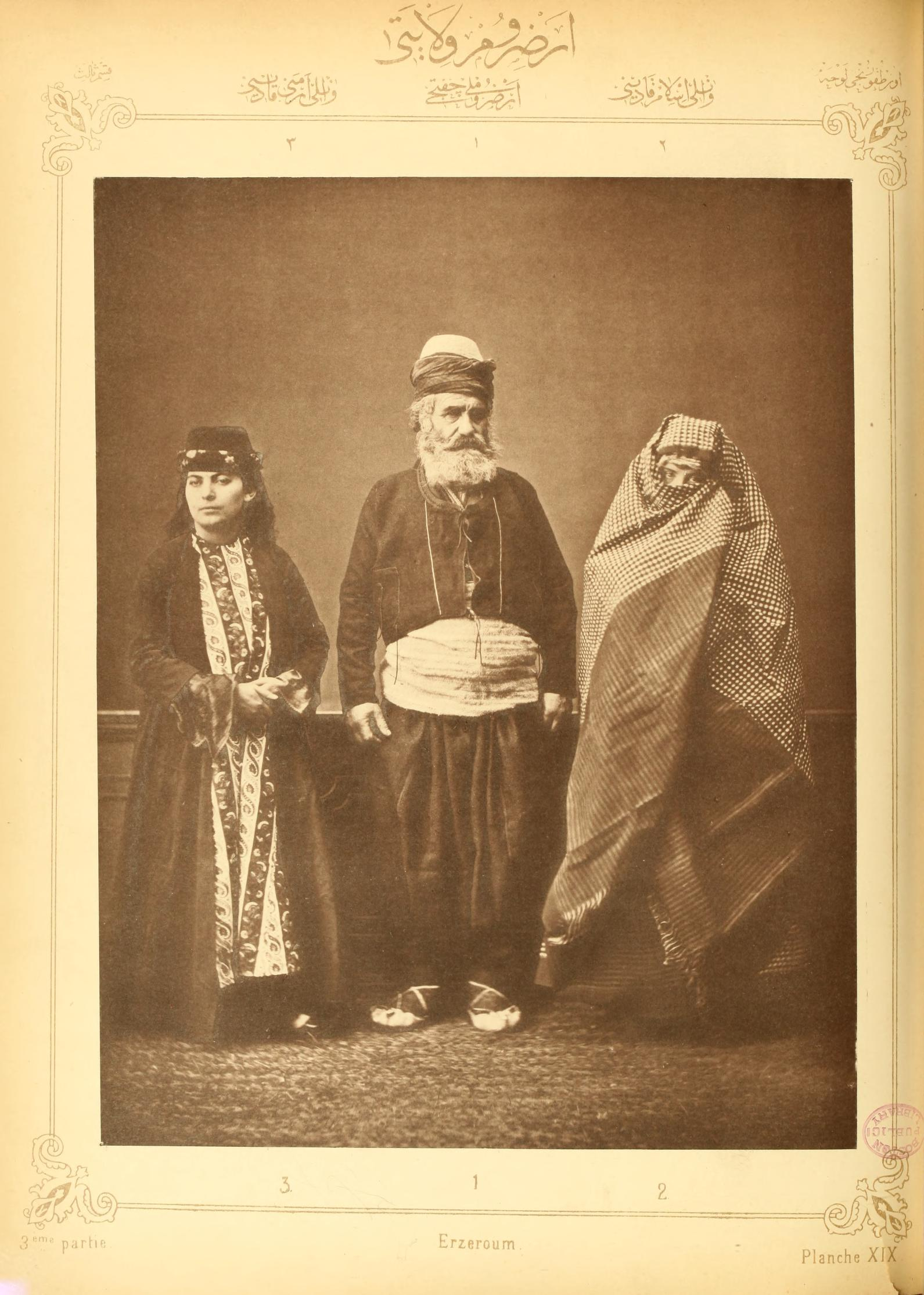
1. Worker from around Erzurum
2. Muslim woman from Van
3. Armenian woman from Van

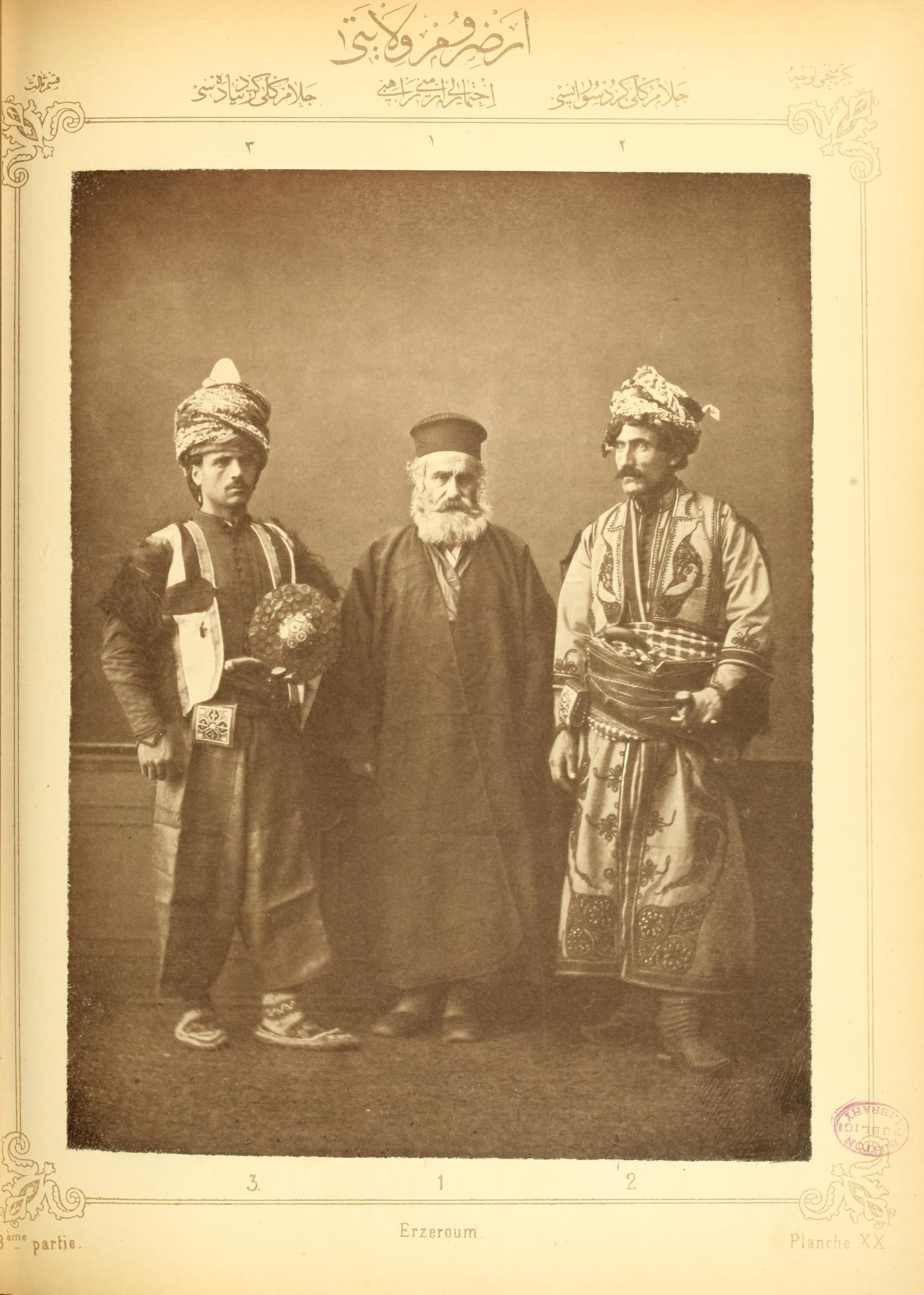
1. Armenian priest from Akhtamar
2. Kurdish horseman from Hakkâri
3. Kurdish piade (foot soldier) from Hakkâri
- Vilayet of Diyarbekir
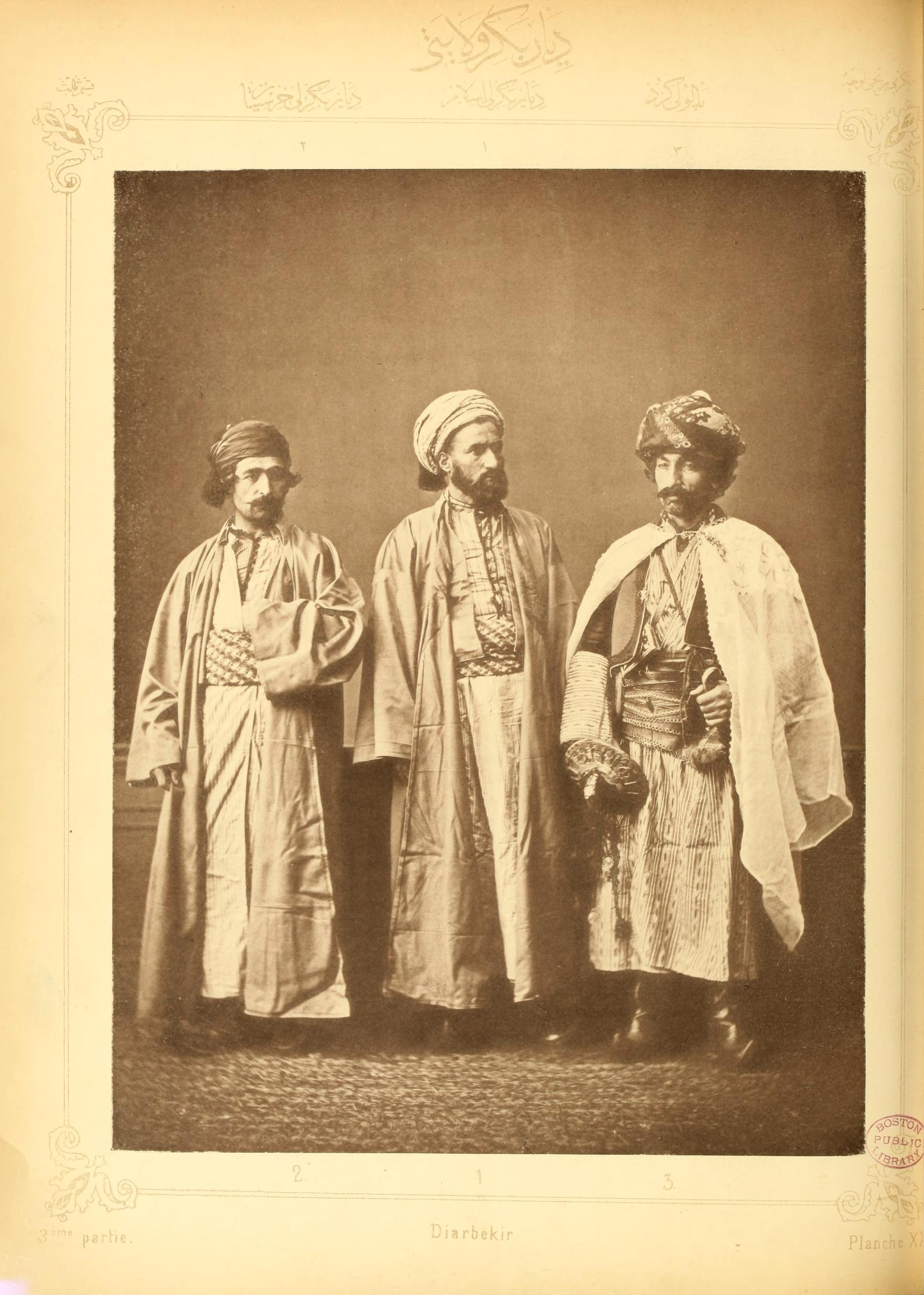
1. Muslim from Diyarbakır
2. Christian from Diyarbakır
3. Kurd from Palu

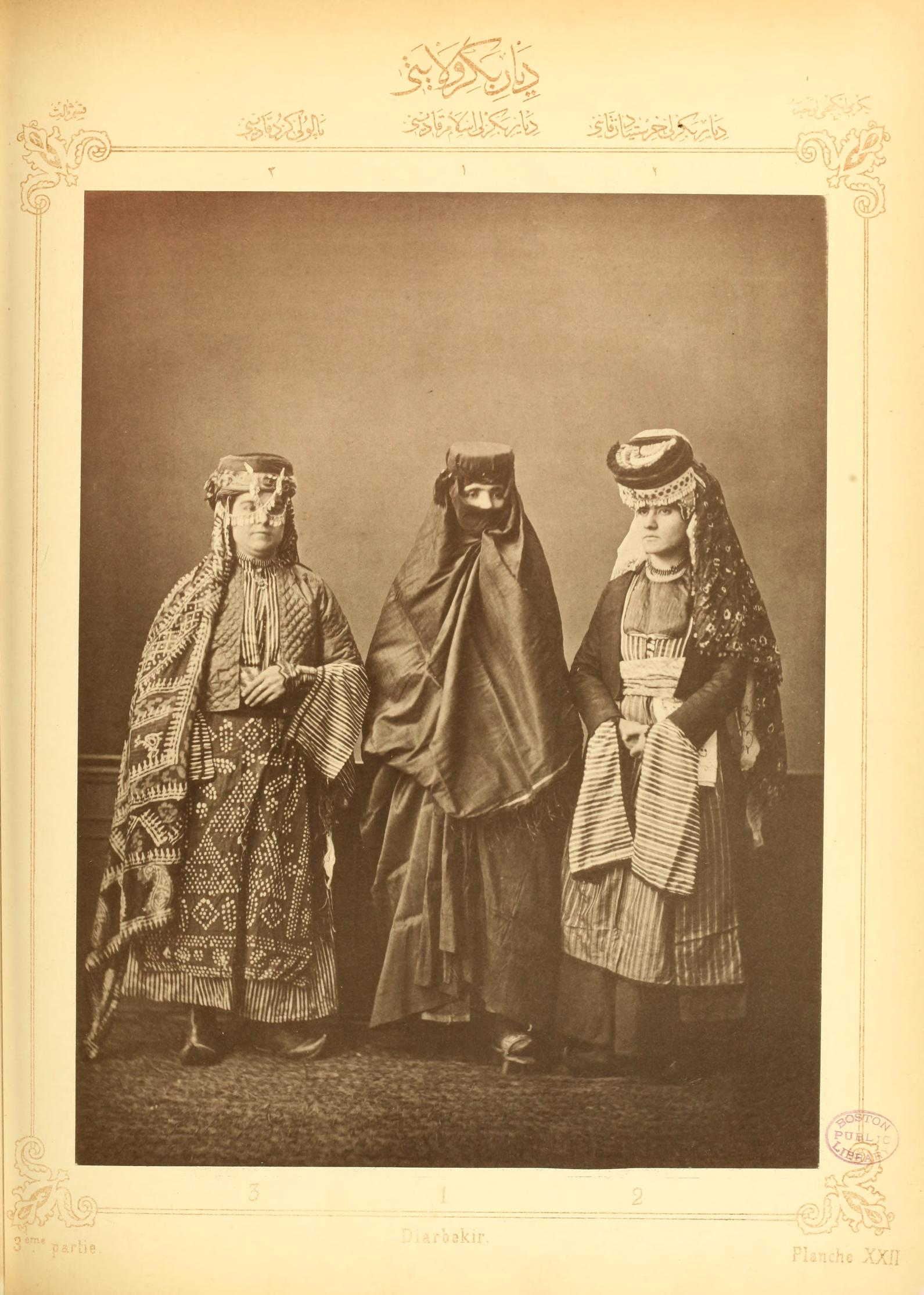
1. Muslim lady from Diyarbakır.
2. Christian lady from Diyarbakır
3. Kurdish woman from Palu

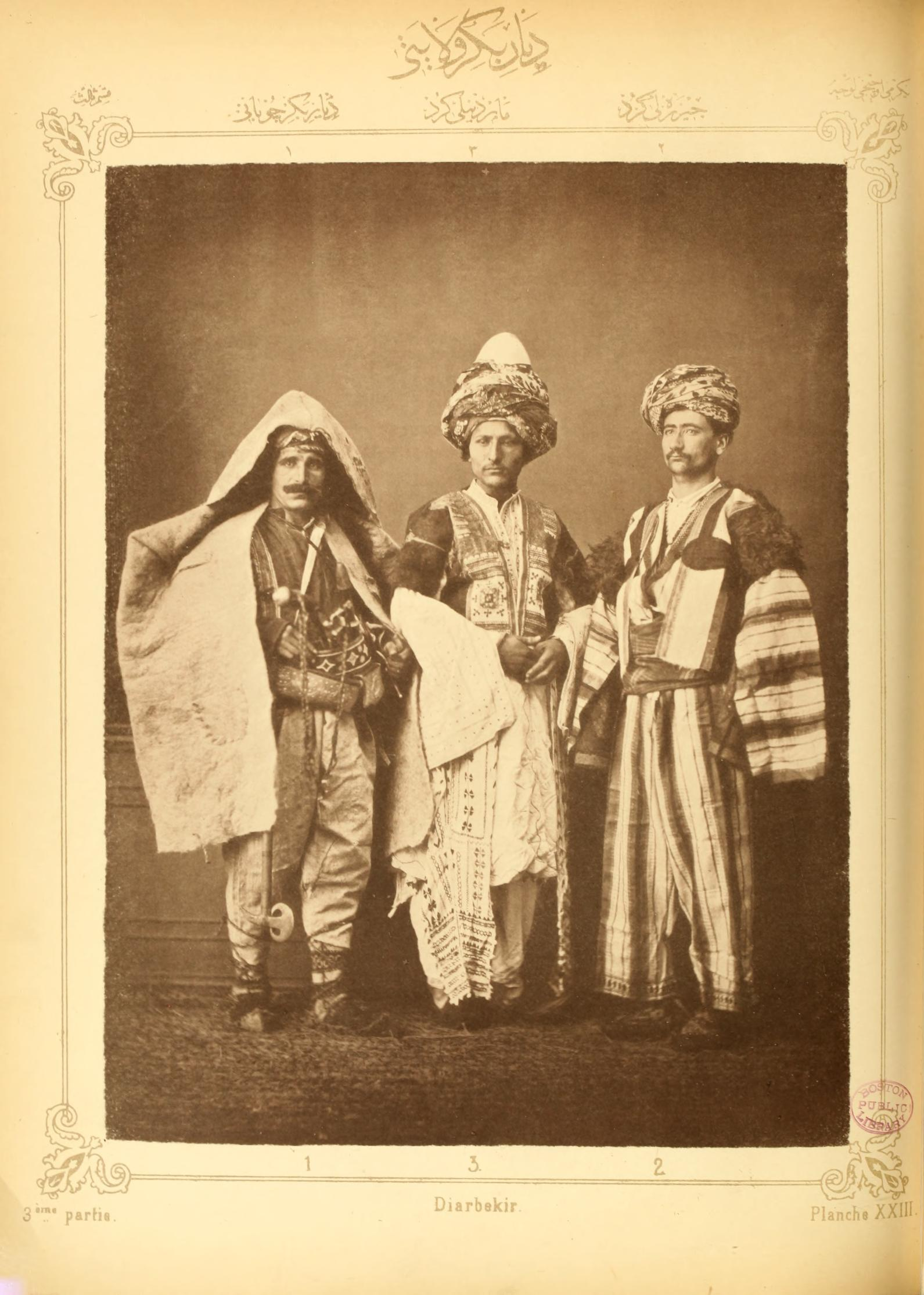
1. Shepherd from around Diyarbakır
2. A Kurd from Cizre
3. Kurd from around Mardin

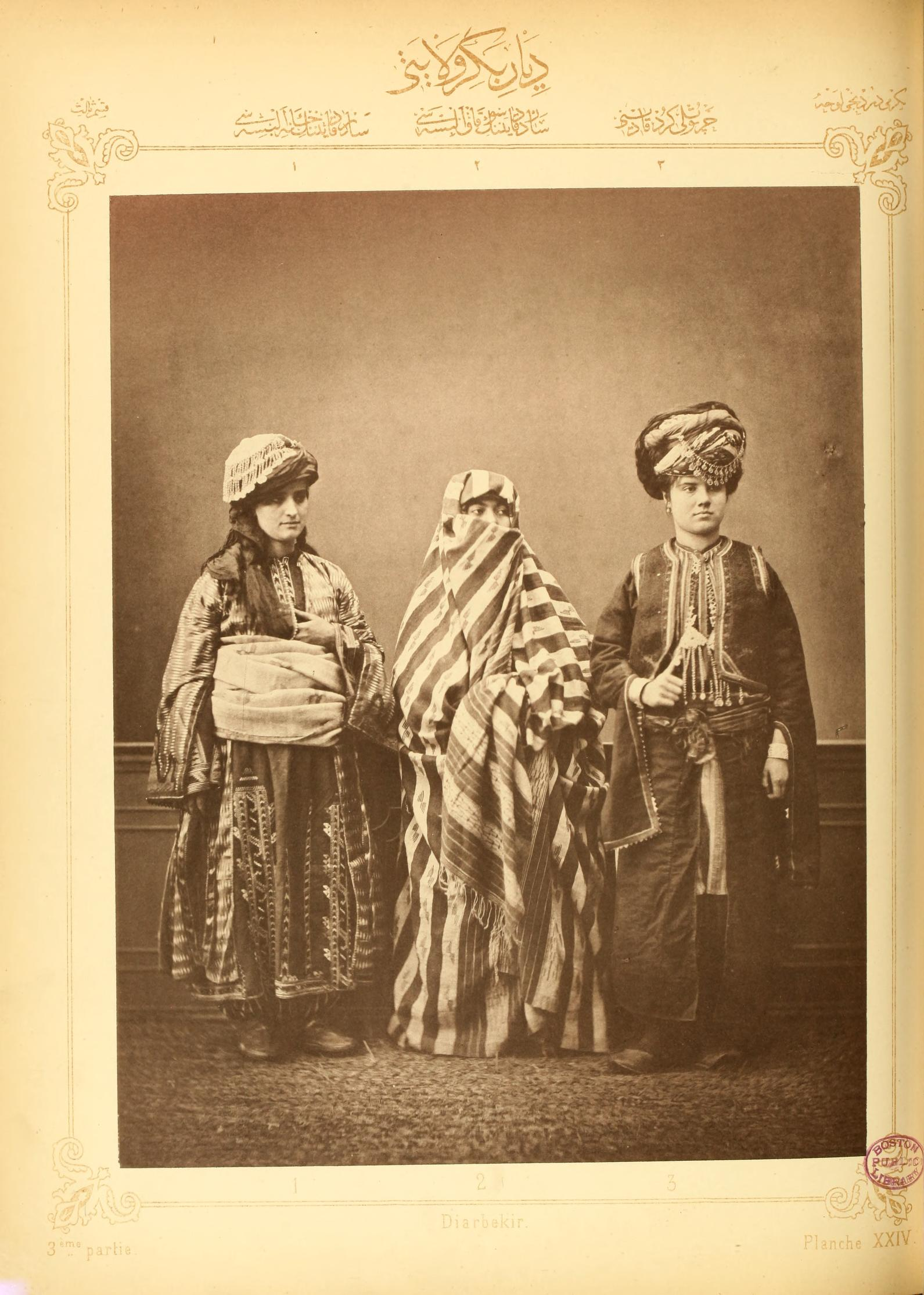
1. Muslim lady from Sa'nt (indoor clothing)
2. Muslim lady from Sa'nt (outdoor clothing)
3. Kurdish woman from Elazığ
- Vilayet of Adana; Vilayet of Aleppo
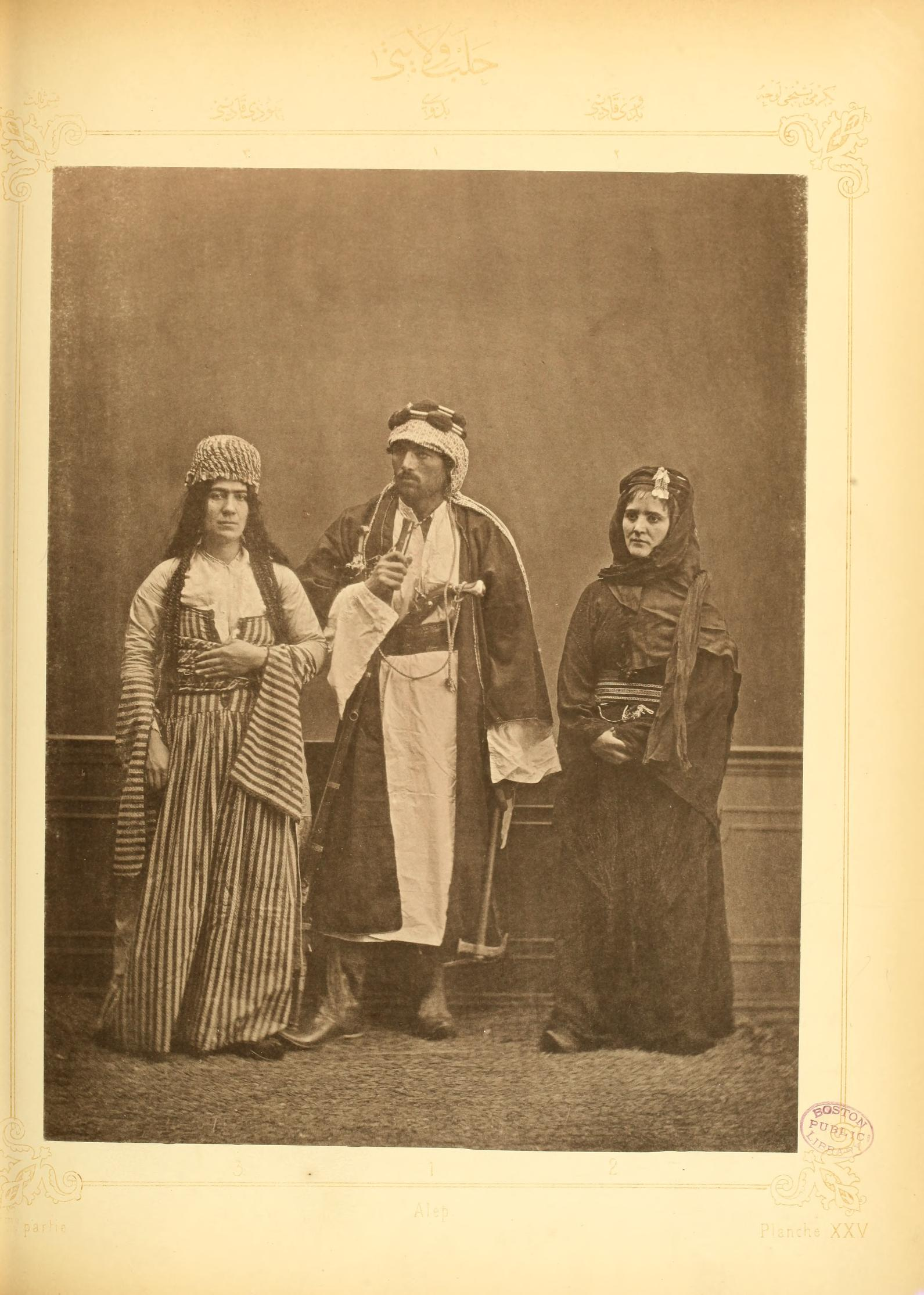
1. Bedouin from the vilayet of Aleppo
2. Bedouin woman from the vilayet of Aleppo
3. Jewish lady from Aleppo

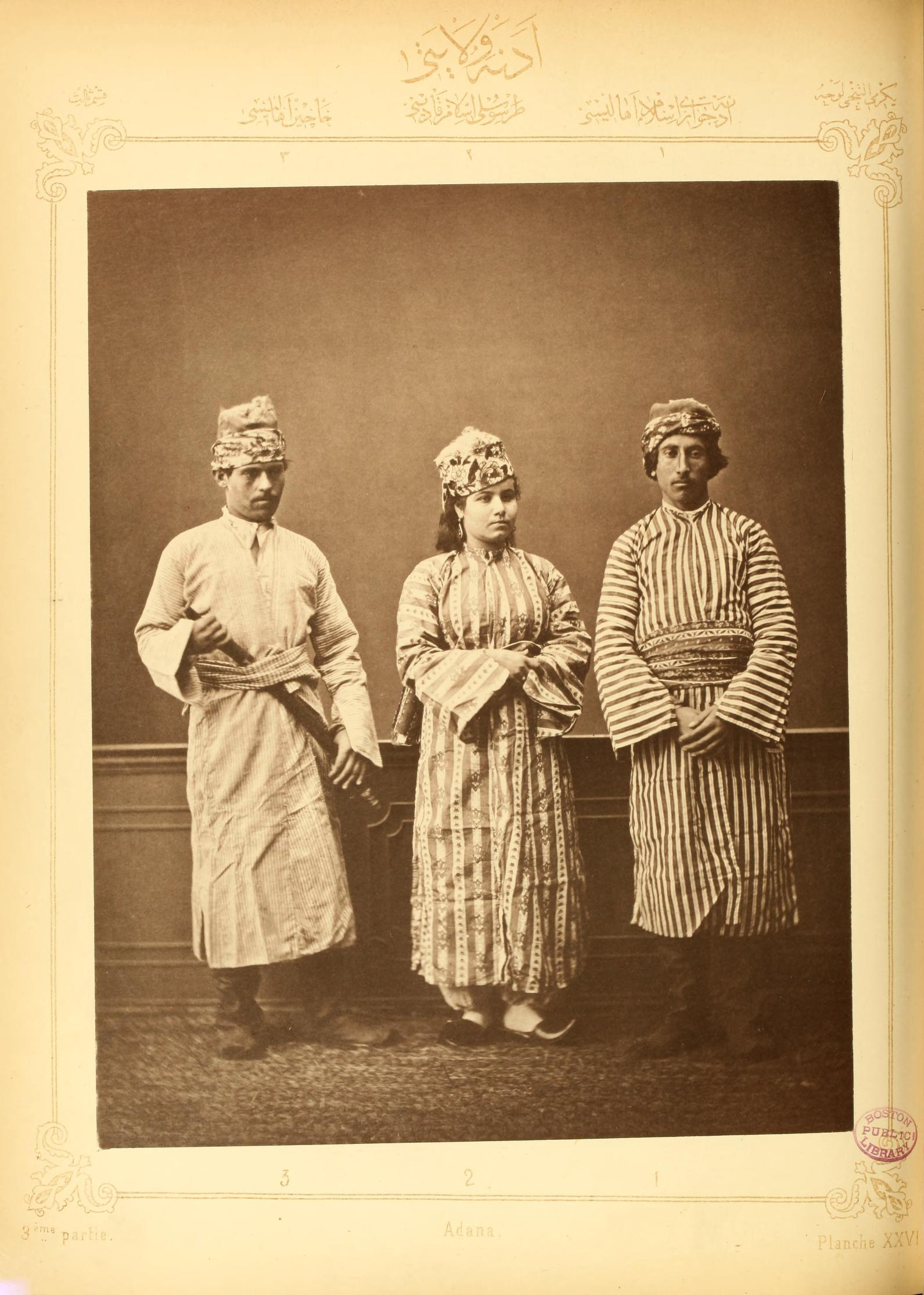
1. Muslim from around Adana
2. Muslim woman from around Tarsus
3. Inhabitant of Hadjin
- Vilayet of Syria
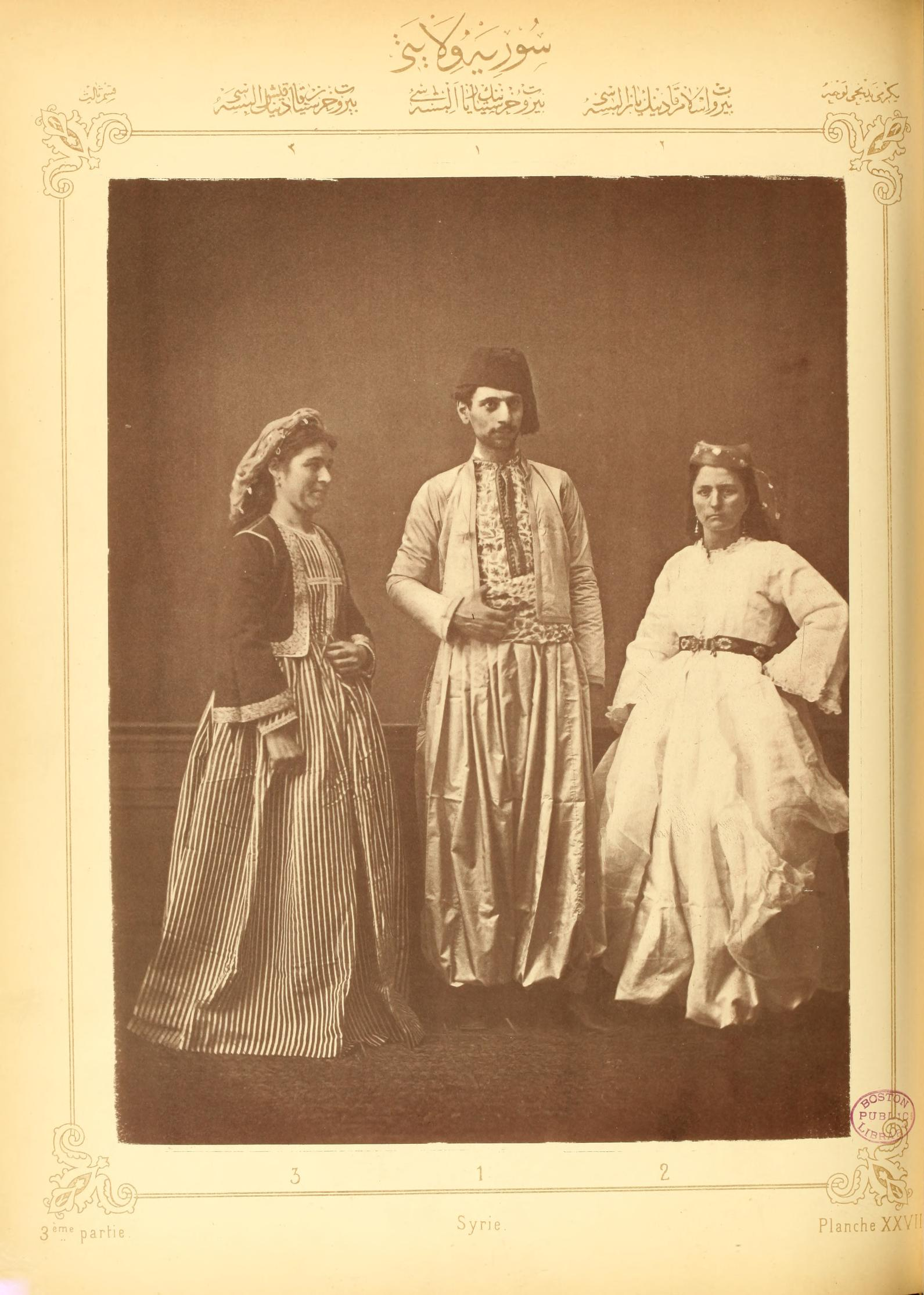
1. Christian inhabitant of Beirut (summer dress)
2. Muslim lady from Beirut
3. Christian lady from Beirut (winter dress)

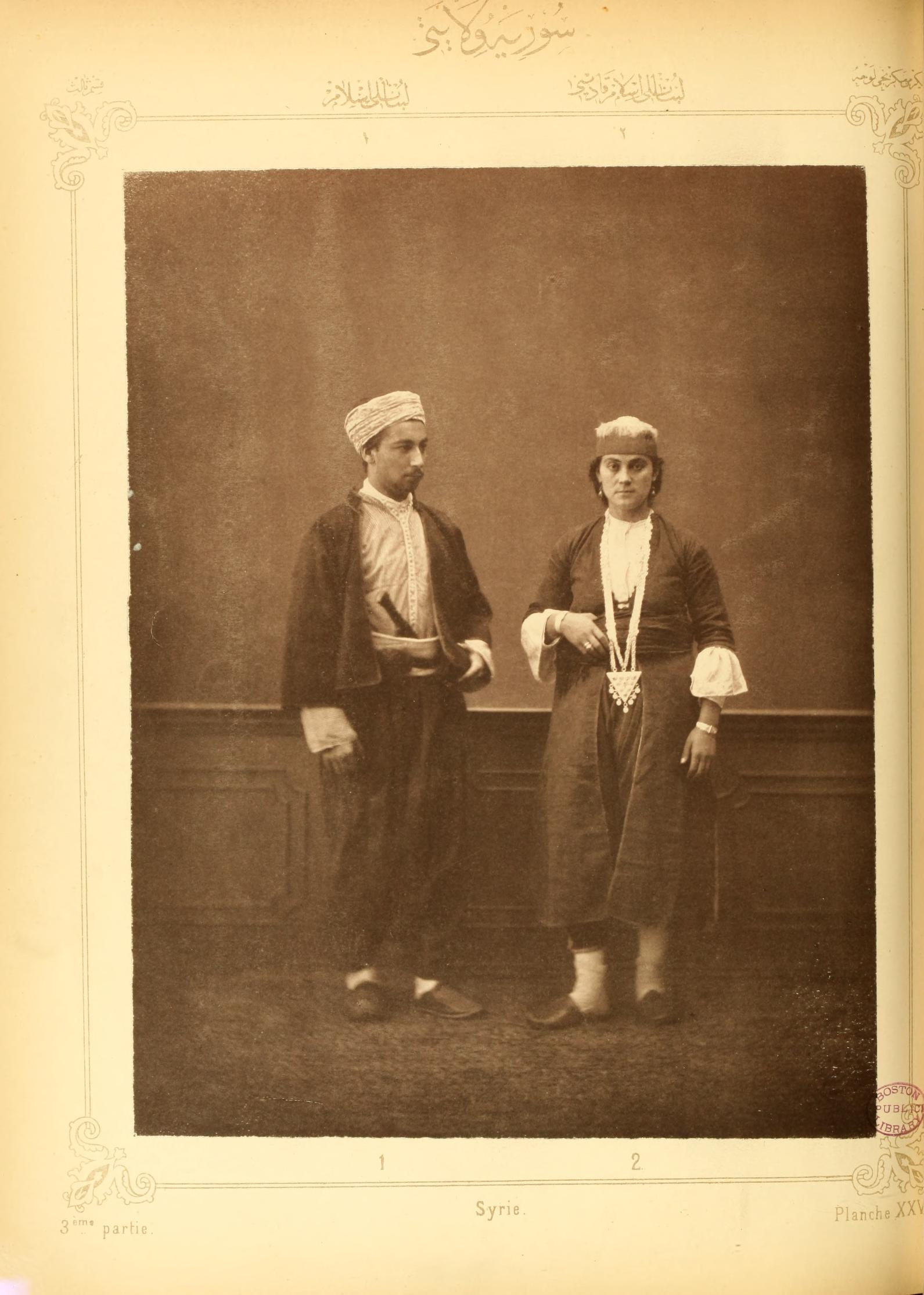
1. Muslim from Lebanon
2. Muslim woman from Lebanon

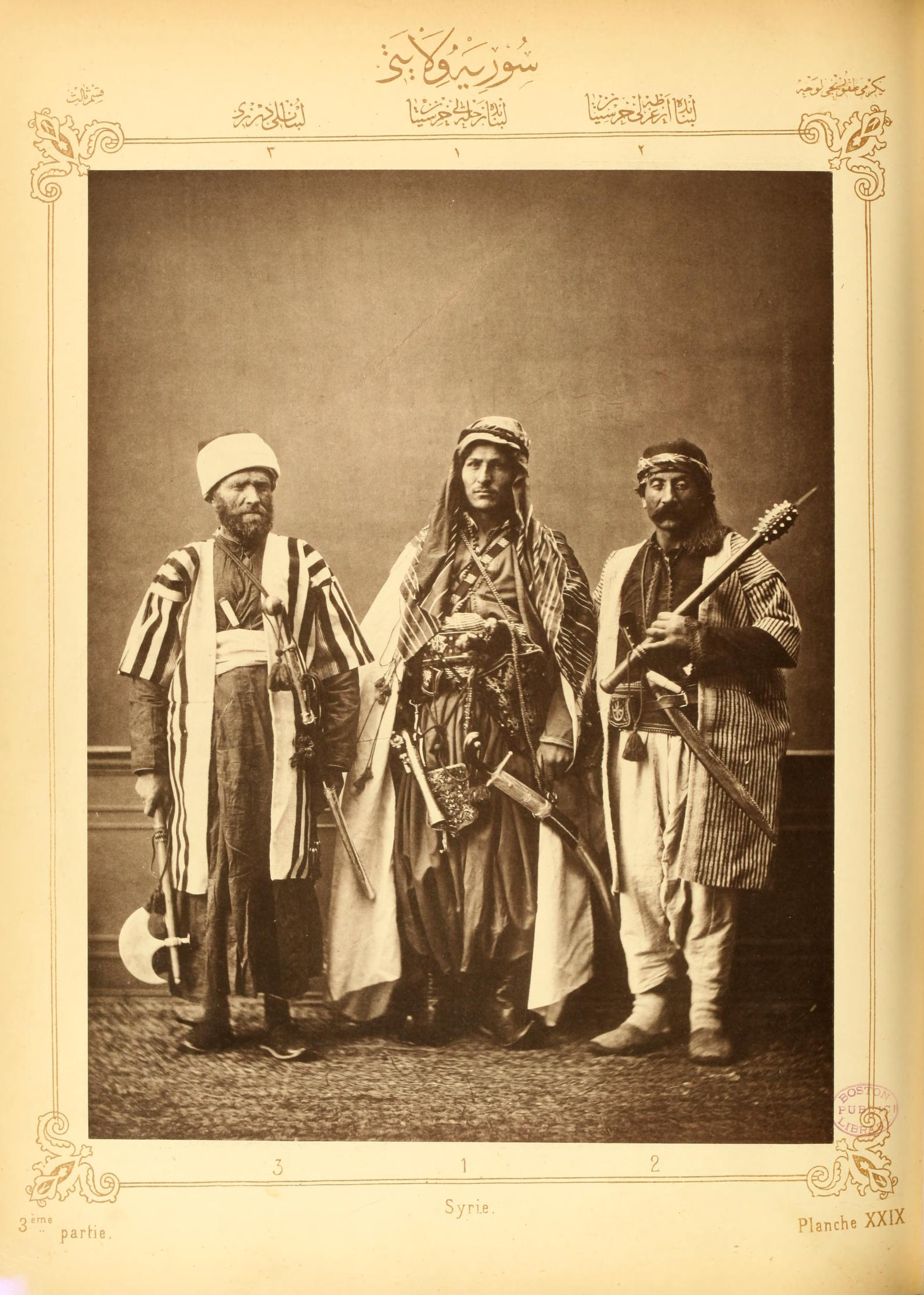
1. Christian mountain dweller, from Zahlé (Lebanon)
2. Christian mountain dweller, from Zgharta (Lebanon)
3. Druze from Lebanon

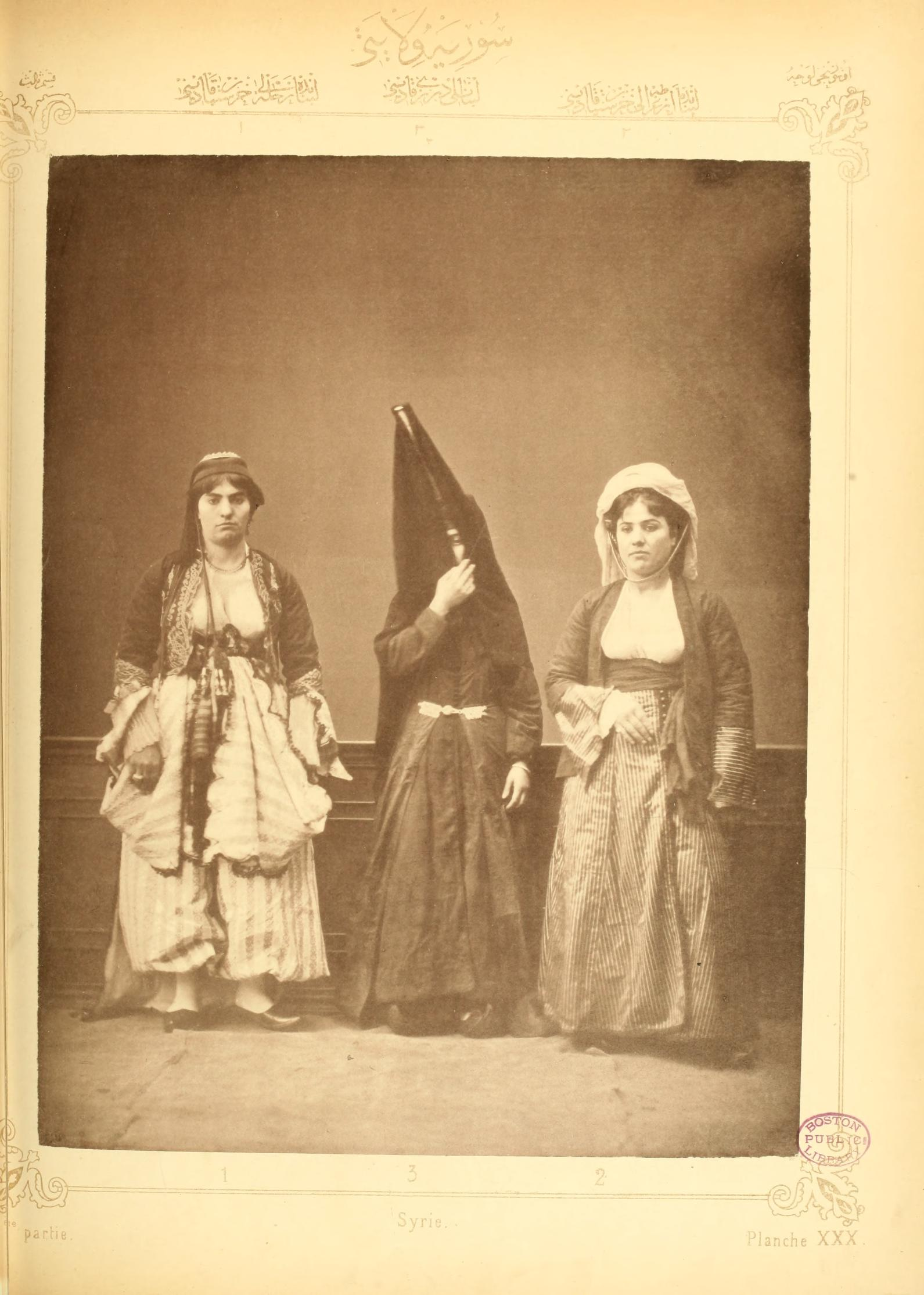
1. Christian woman from Zahlé (Lebanon)
2. Christian woman from Zgharta (Lebanon)
3. Druze woman from Lebanon

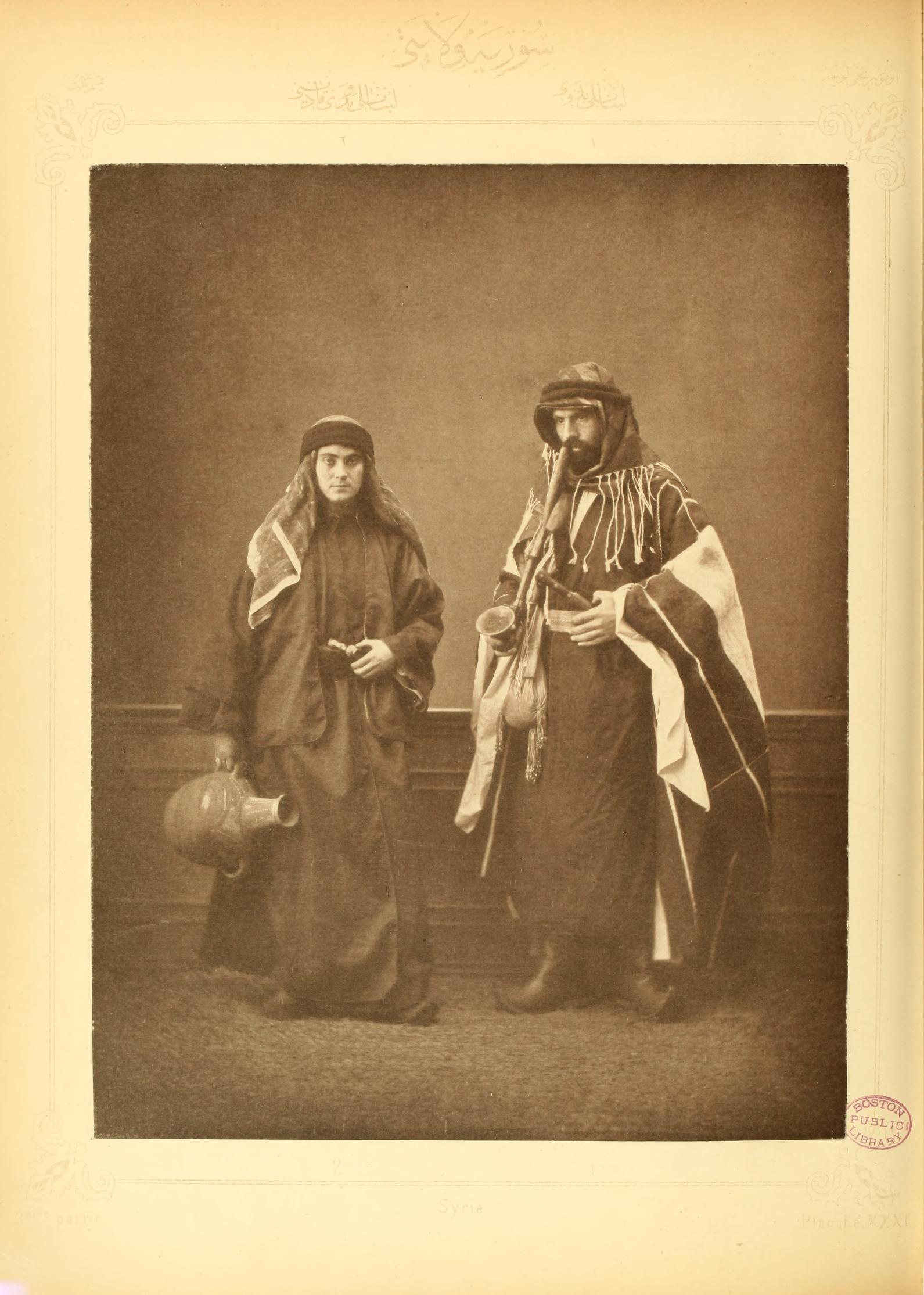
1. Bedouin from Mount Lebanon.
2. Bedouin woman from Lebanon

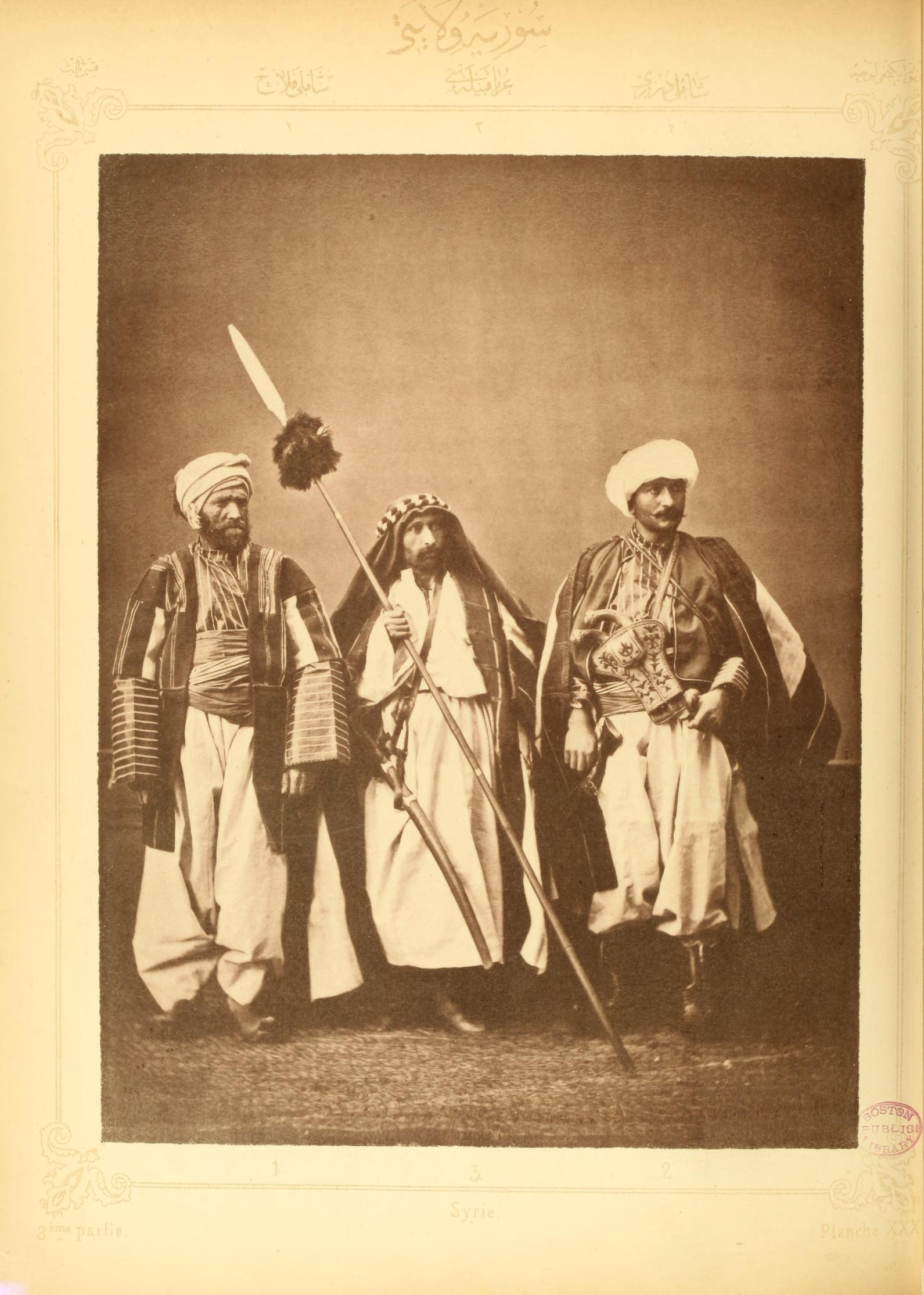
1. Fellah from around Damascus
2. Druze from around Damascus
3. Arab nomad woman from the Ourban tribe

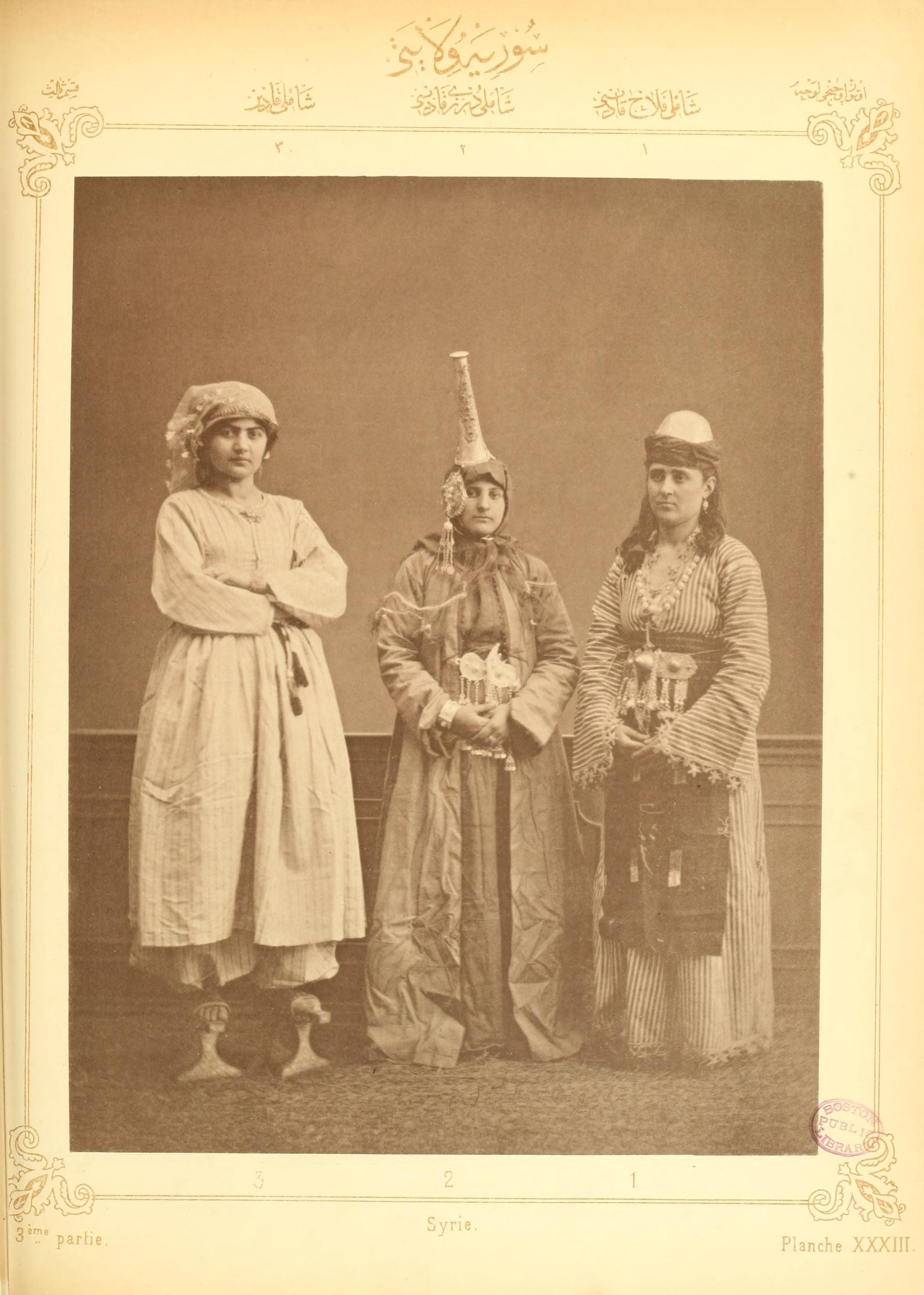
1. Fellah woman from around Damascus
2. Druze woman from around Damascus
3. Lady from Damascus

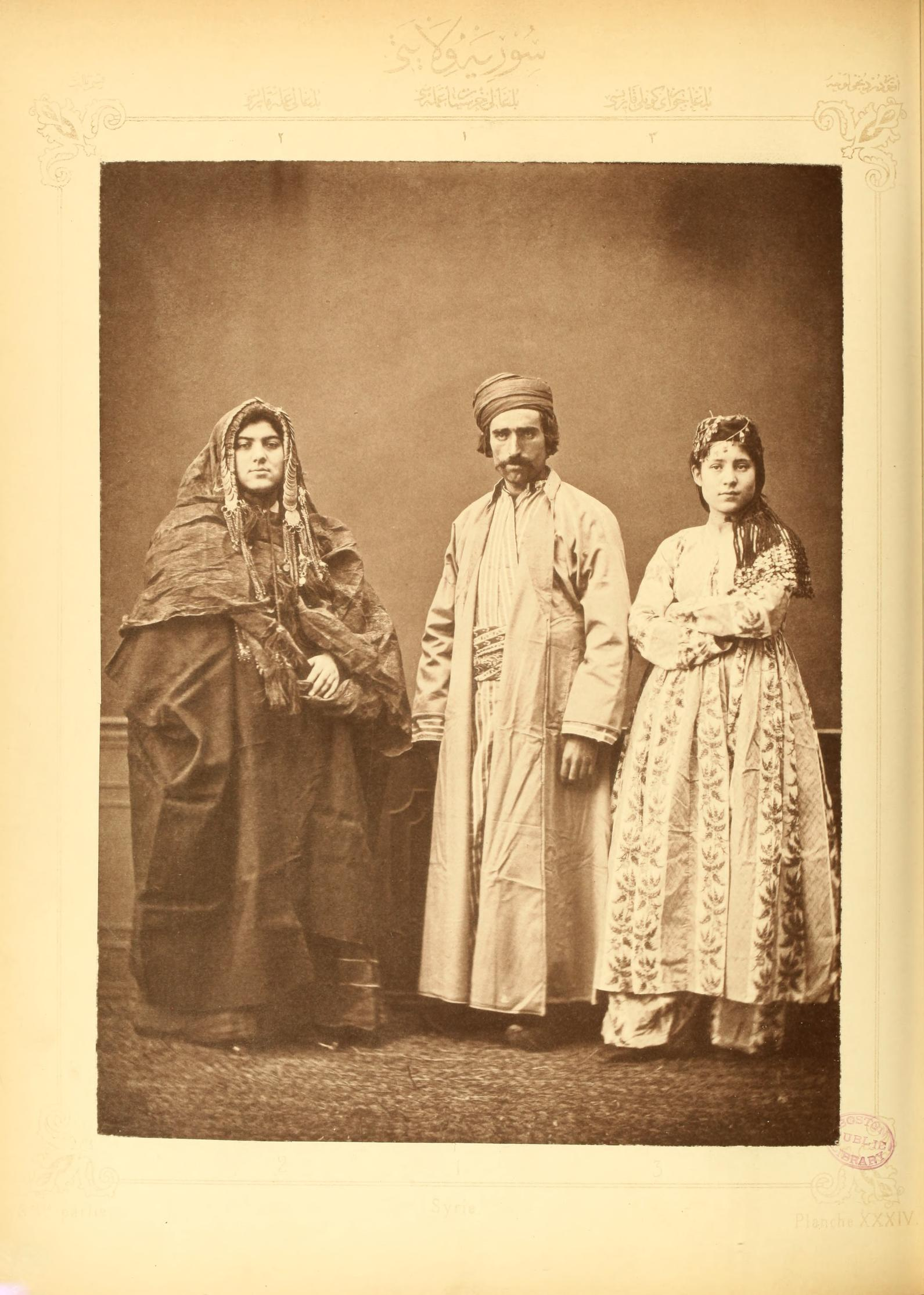
1. Christian artisan from Belka
2. Artisan woman from Belka
3. Peasant Muslim woman from around Belka

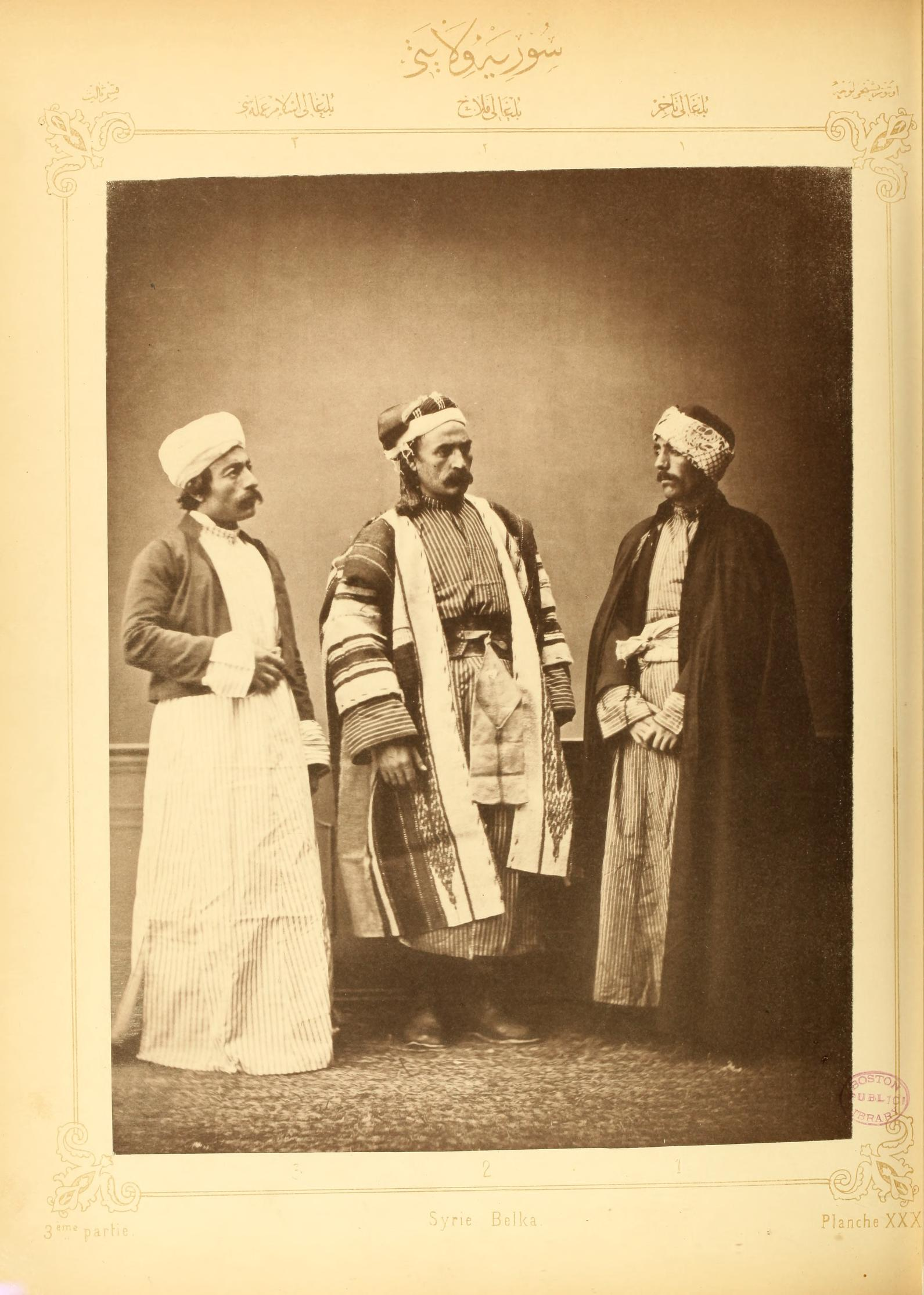
1. Shopkeeper from Belka
2. Fellah from around Belka
3. Muslim artisan from Belka

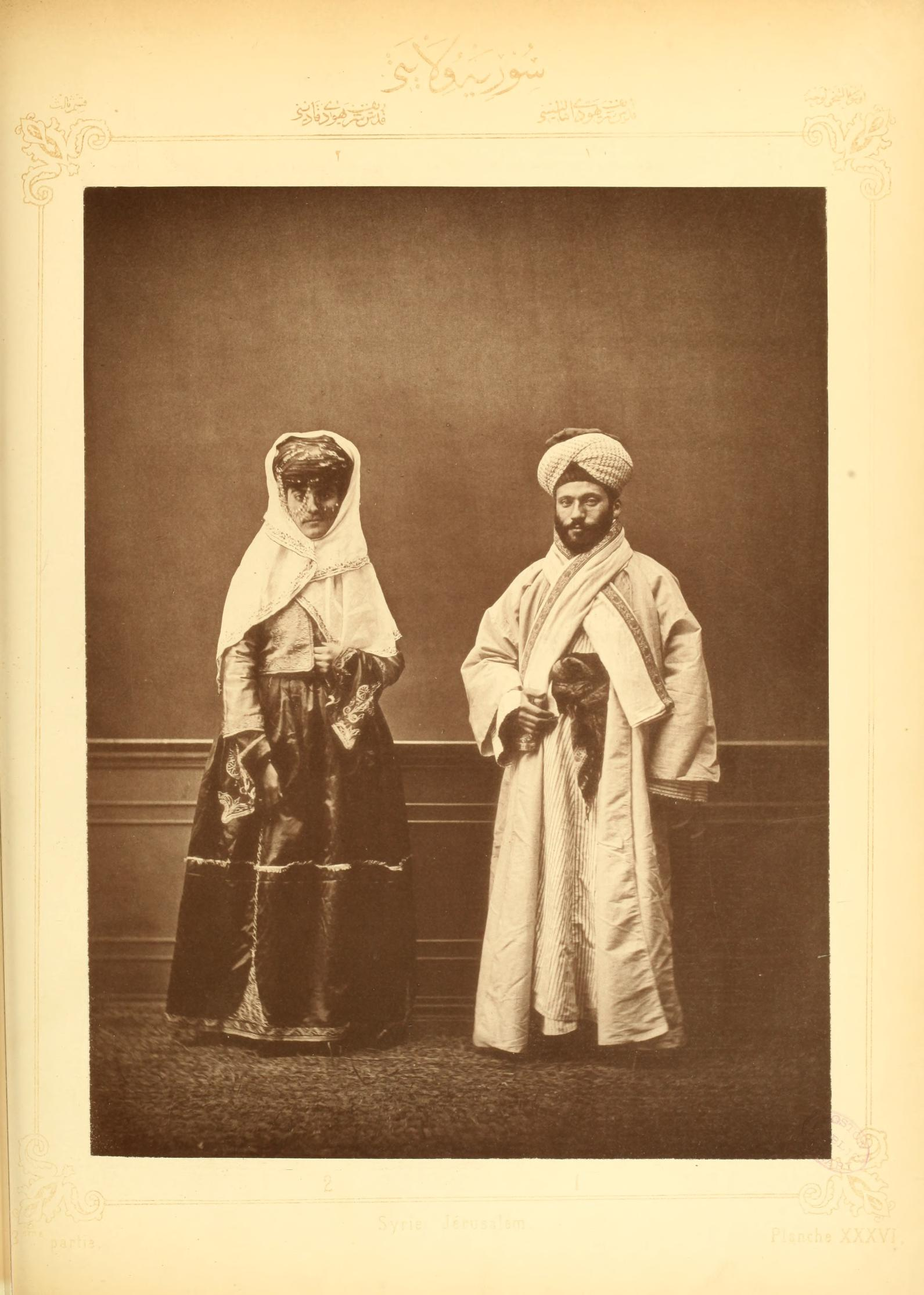
1. Jew from Jerusalem
2. Jewish woman from Jerusalem

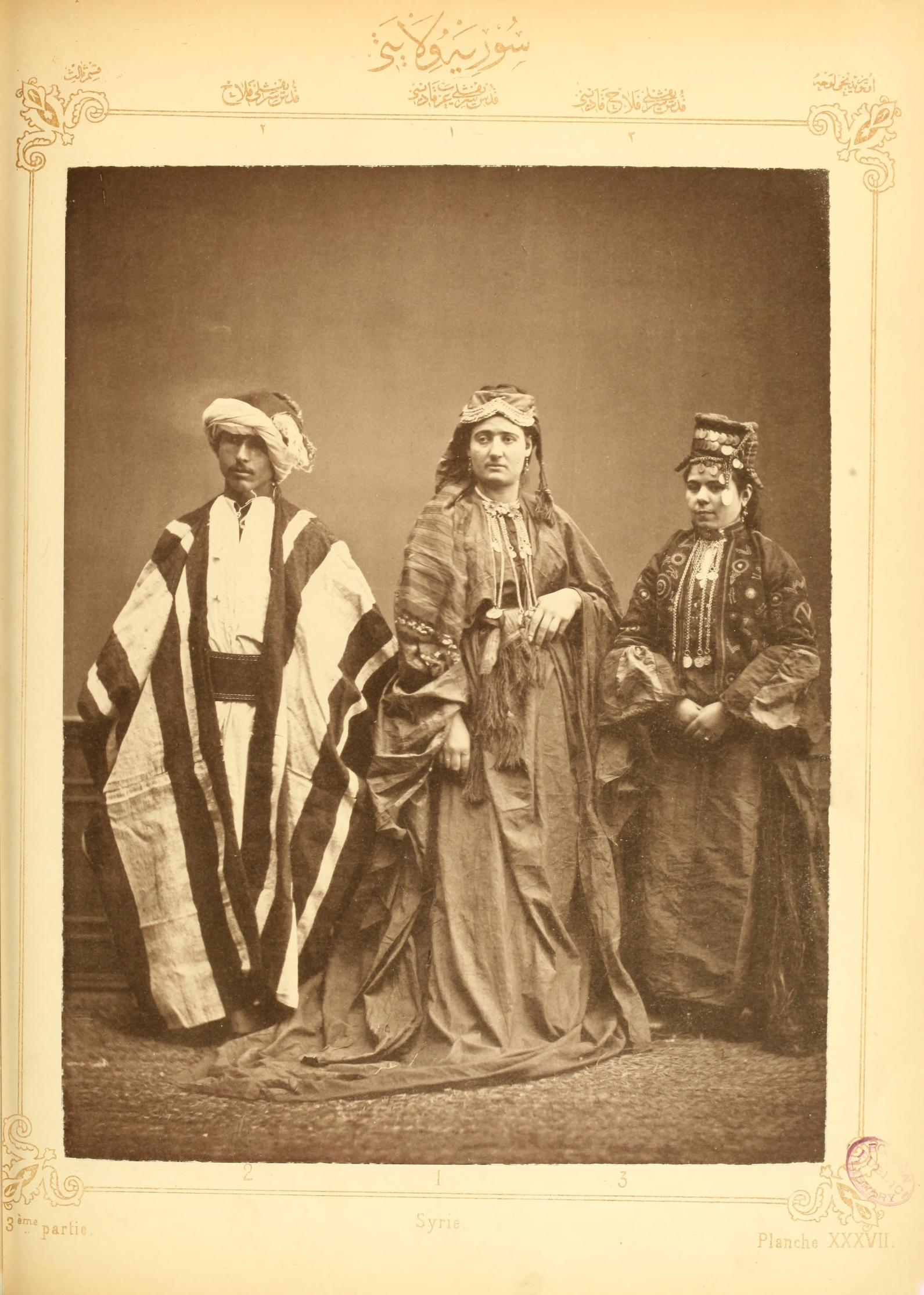
1. Arab lady from Jerusalem
2. Fellah from around Jerusalem
3. Fellah woman from around Jerusalem
- Vilayets of Baghdad; Hejaz; Yemen; Tripolitania
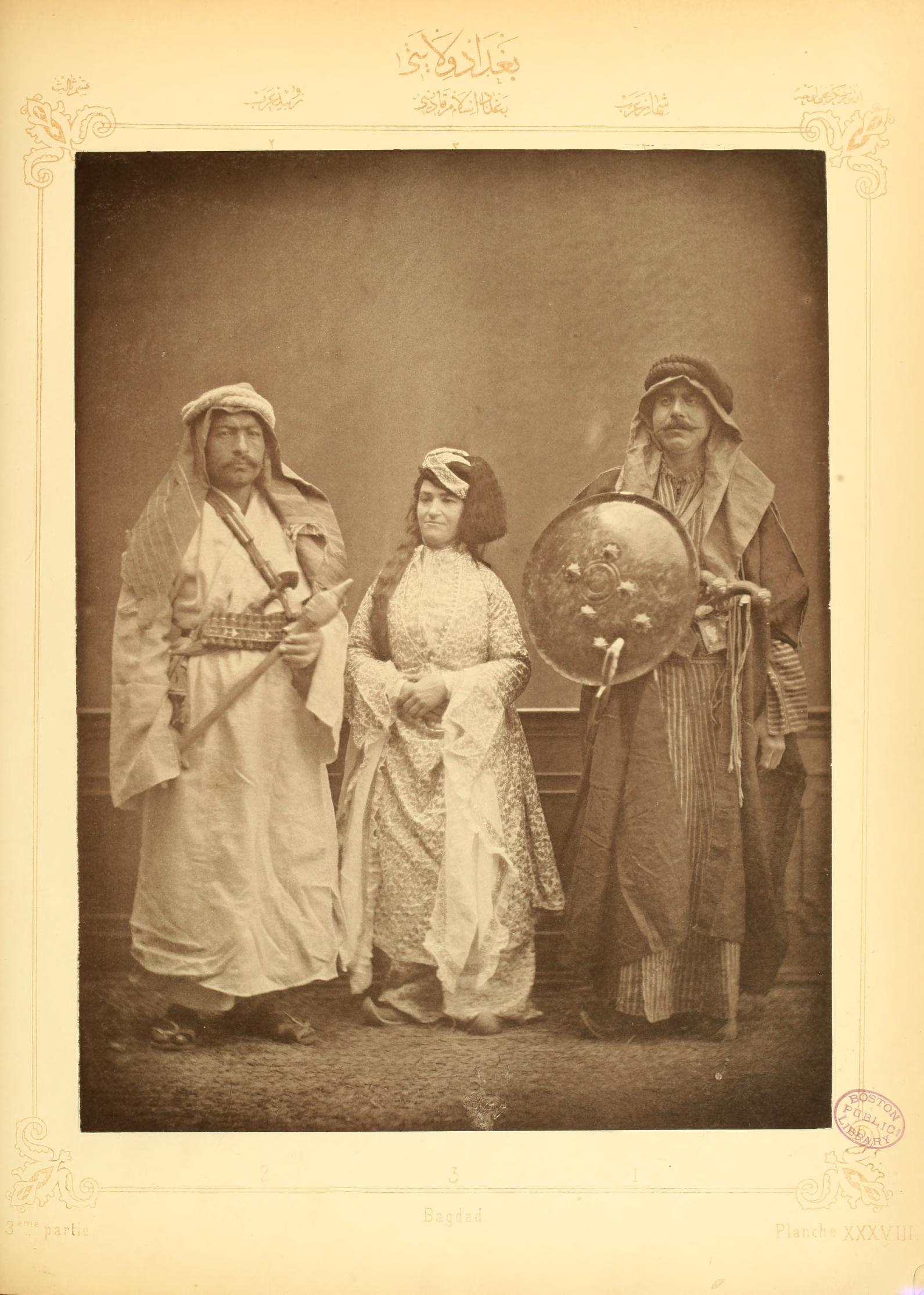
1. Arab man of the Shammar tribe
2. Arab man from Zubaid tribe
3. Muslim lady from Baghdad

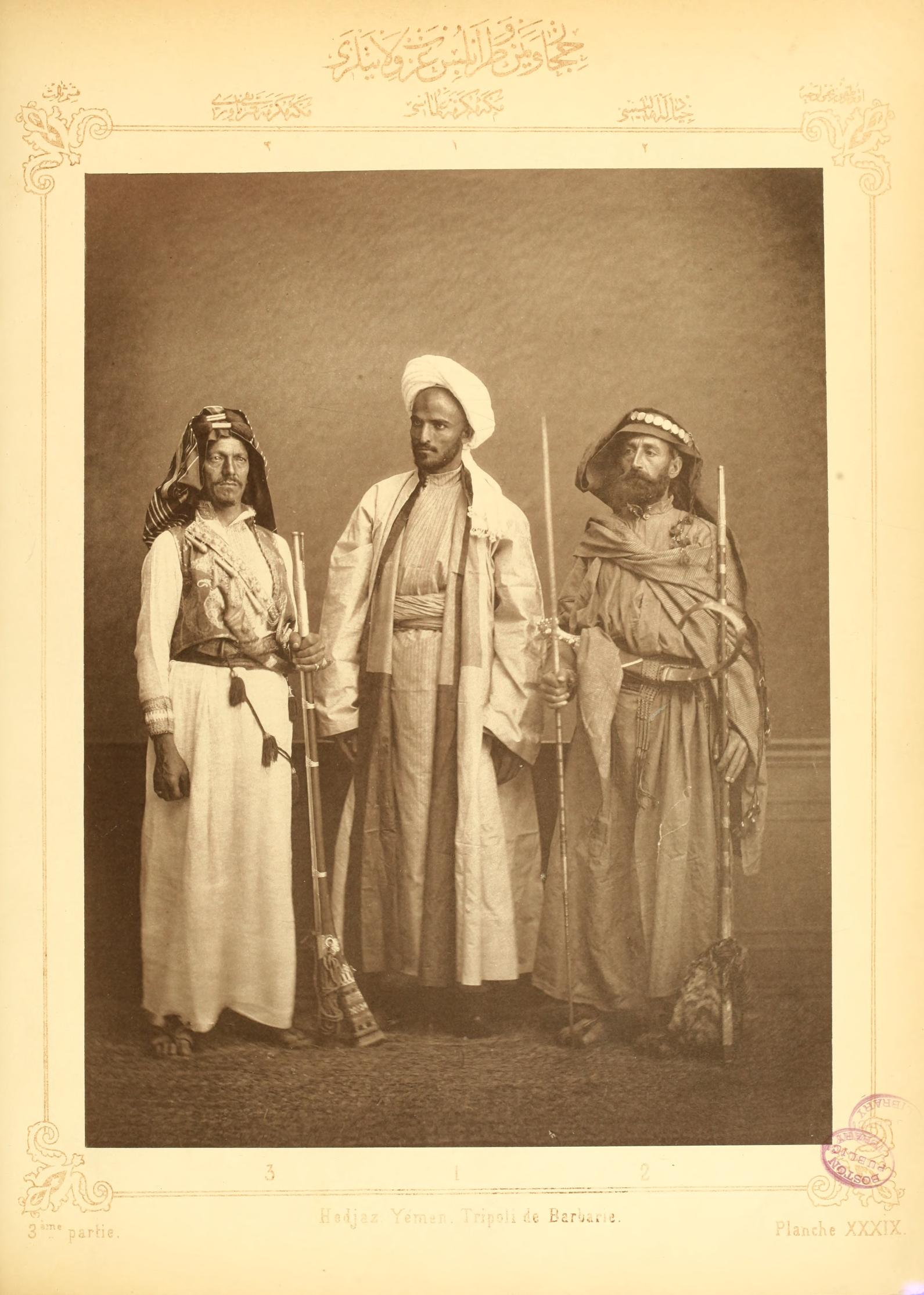
1. A'alim from Mecca
2. Inhabitant from Djeaddele (environs of Mecca)
3. Baveri of the guard of the Sharif of Mecca

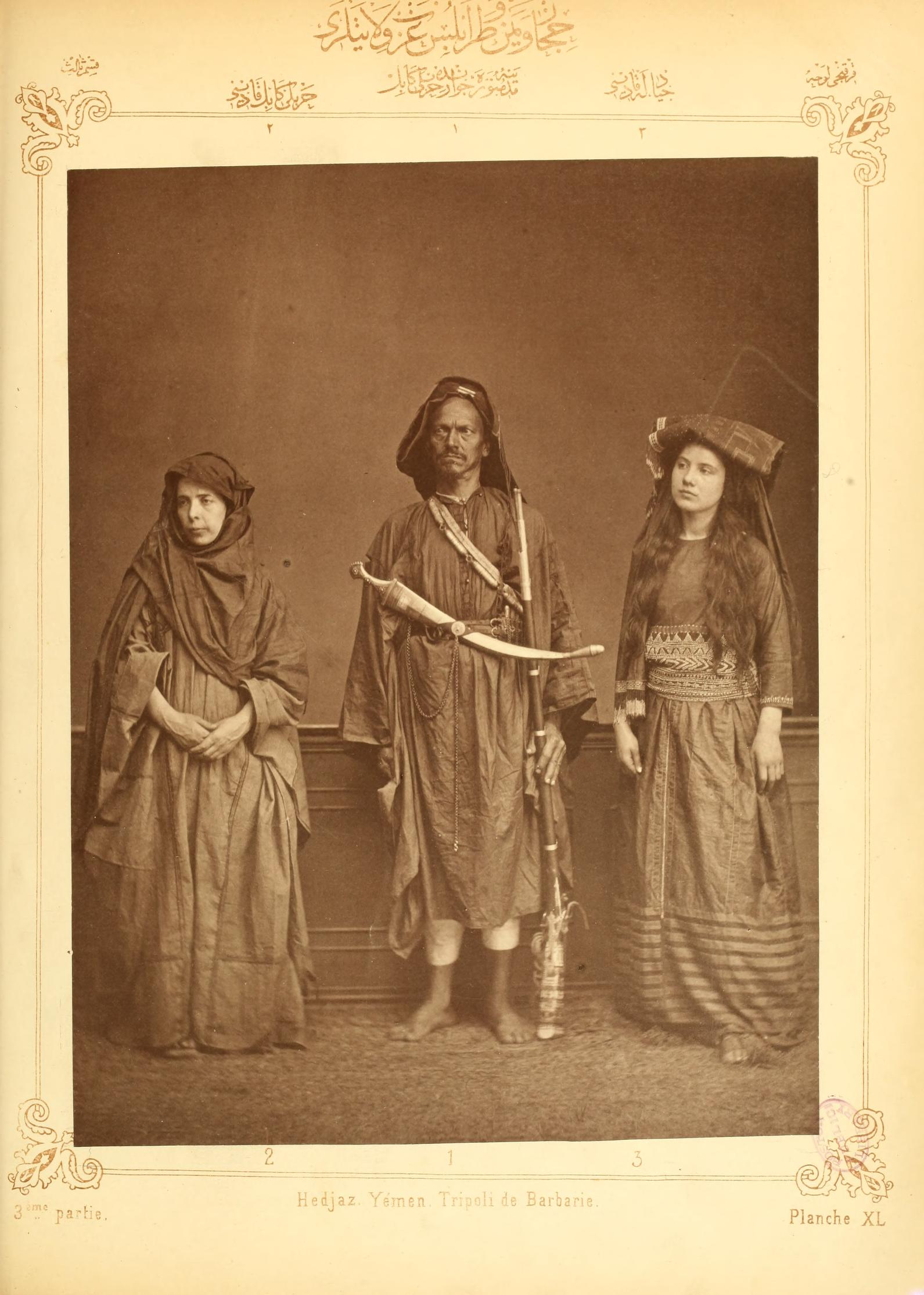
1. Kabyle of the Harb tribe (environs of Medina)
2. Kabyle woman of the Harb tribe (environs of Medina)
3. Muslim woman from Djeaddele (environs of Mecca)

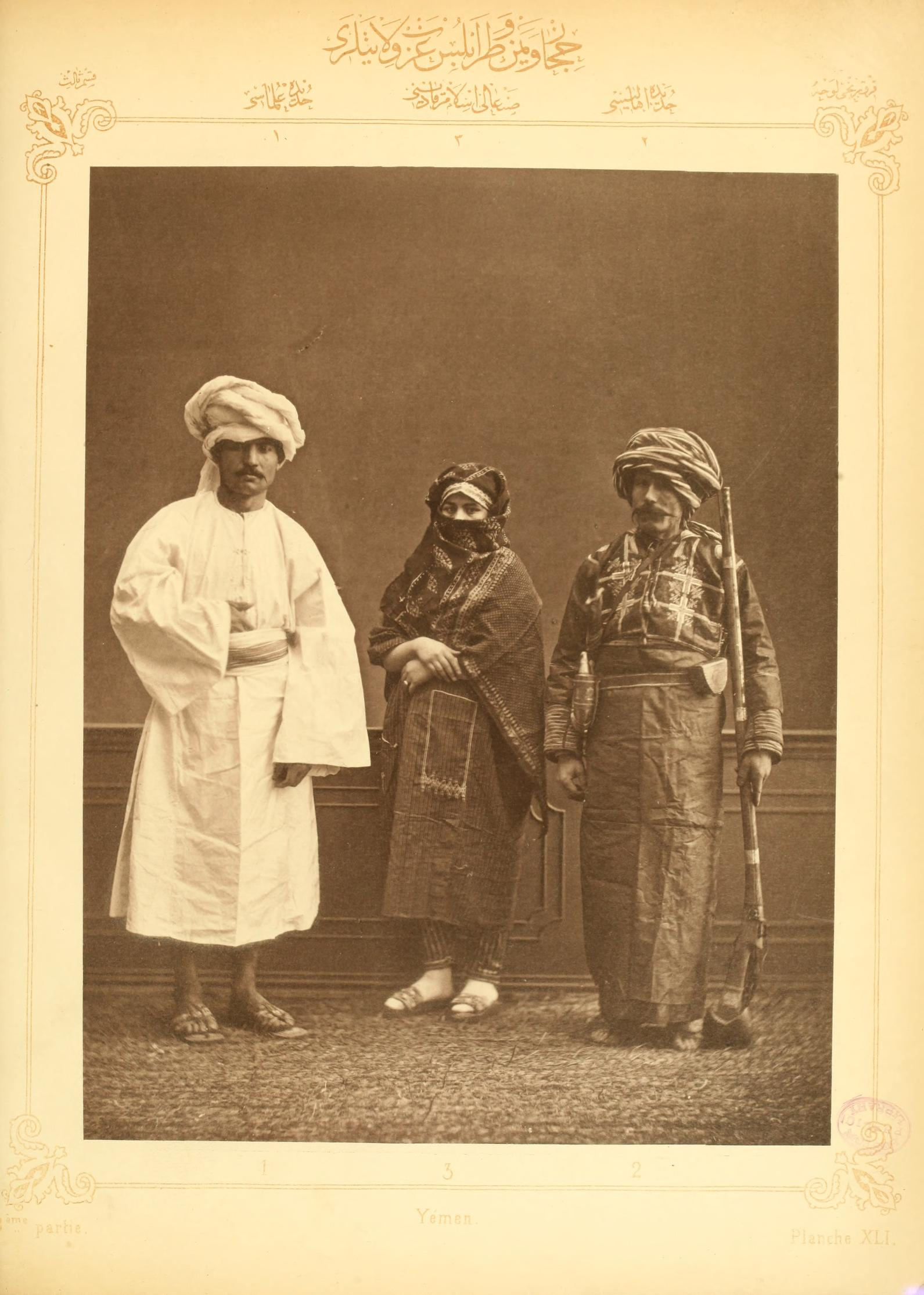
1. A'alim from Al Hudaydah
2. Burgher from Al Hudaydah
3. Muslim lady from Sanaa

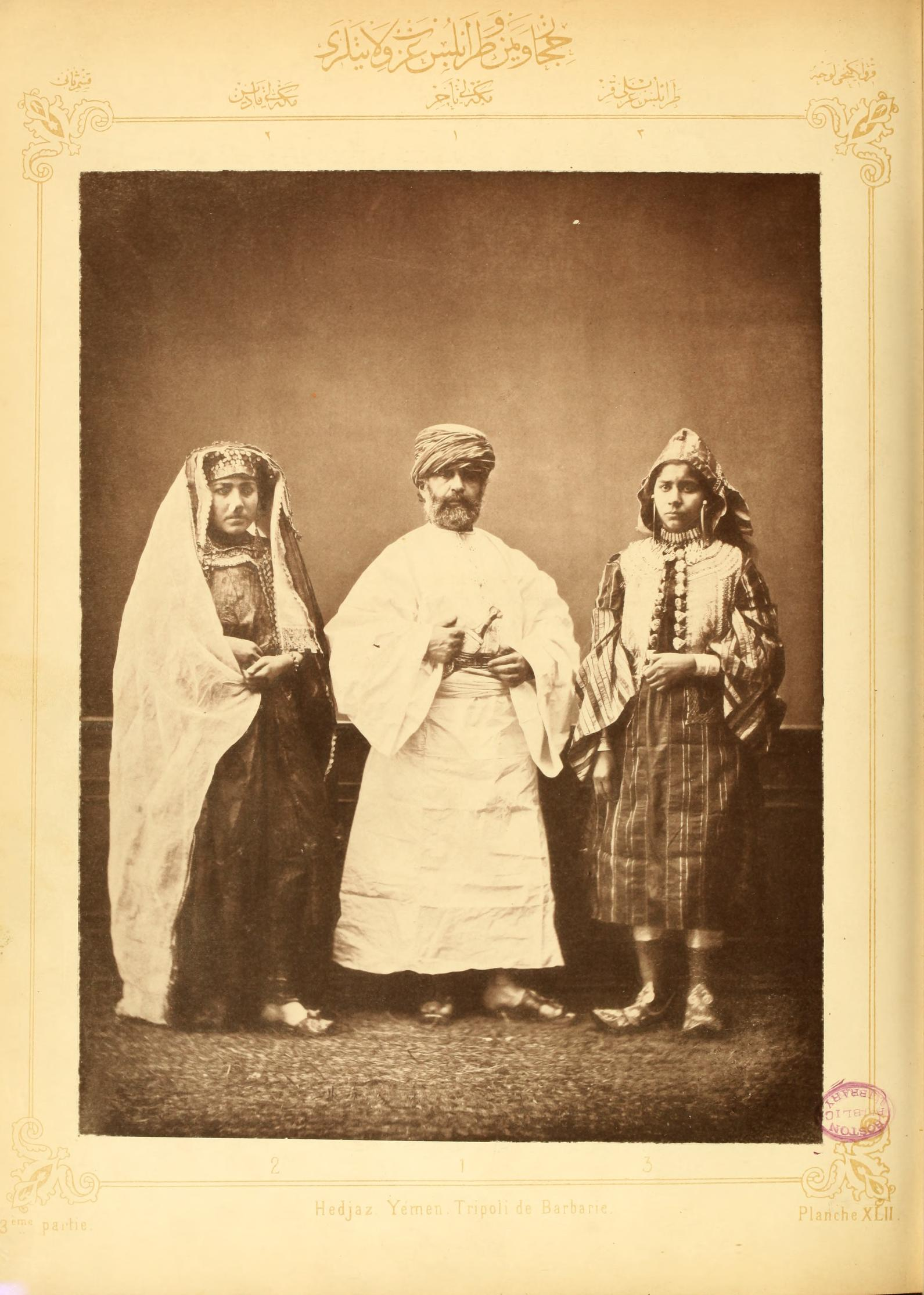
1. Shopkeeper from Mocha
2. Muslim lady from Mecca
3. Moorish girl from Tripoli

== See also ==
- Kaftan
- Calpack
- Fez
- Jelick
- Turkish salvar
- Harem pants
- Bloomers
- Turban
- Yashmak
- Dolman
- Çarşaf
- Delia (clothing)
- Kontusz
- Pas kontuszowy
- Żupan
- Towel
- Silahlik
- Timeline of the Turks (500–1300)
