= Khor Al Adaid =

Khor Al Adaid خور العديد
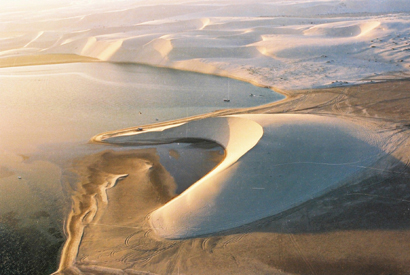
- Sand dunes at Khor Al Adaid, photographed in 2004.

- Location within Qatar
- Coordinates: 24.630°N 51.296°E
- Country: Qatar
- Municipality: Al Wakrah Municipality
- Zone: Zone 98
- District no.: 762

Area
  - Total: 705 km^{2} (272 sq mi)

Population (2015)
  - Total: 7
  - Density: 0.0099/km^{2} (0.026/sq mi)

Khor Al Adaid, (Arabic: خور العديد; also spelled Khawr Al Udayd and Khor Al-‘Udeid) is a settlement and inlet of the Persian Gulf in Al Wakrah Municipality in southeast Qatar, on the border with Saudi Arabia. Approximately 78 kilometres (48 mi) south of the capital Doha, it is also known to local English speakers as the "Inland Sea". It formerly accommodated a small town and served as the center of a long-running territorial dispute between Sheikh Jassim bin Mohammed Al Thani and Sheikh Zayed bin Khalifa Al Nahyan. At the present, it is designated as a major tourist destination for Qatar.

Khor Al Adaid was officially designated as a nature reserve by the Qatari government in 2007. Qatar has proposed the site's inclusion on the UNESCO World Heritage Site list, but as of 2026, it remains on UNESCO's Tentative List.

== Etymology ==
Khor is the Arabic term for "creek". The second constituent, adaid, derives from the Arabic root 'adad, referring to a number or multitude. In this context, the term refers to a group of households historically engaged in the craft of ship repair. Owing to this local expertise, pearl diving vessels would frequent the area to have their ships serviced.

== History ==
=== Settlement and subsequent conflicts ===
The area of Khor Al Adaid was a point of friction between Qatar and polities in what is now Saudi Arabia and the United Arab Emirates (UAE). Khor Al Adaid had served as a refuge for pirates from the Emirate of Abu Dhabi (now part of the UAE) during the 19th century. Members of the Bani Yas tribe migrated and settled in the area on three separate occasions; 1835, 1849 and 1869. According to a historical overview of Khor Al Adaid written by the British government in India, "in 1836, Al-Kubaisat, a section of the Bani-Yas, under Sheikh Khadim-bin-Nahman, being desirous of avoiding the consequences of certain recent piracies, seceded from Abu Dhabi and established themselves at Odeid. [...] In 1849, there was a fresh secession, followed by a second compulsory return; at length, in 1869, a party under Sheikh Buttye-bin-Khadim again settled at Odeid, and repudiated their allegiance to the parent State."

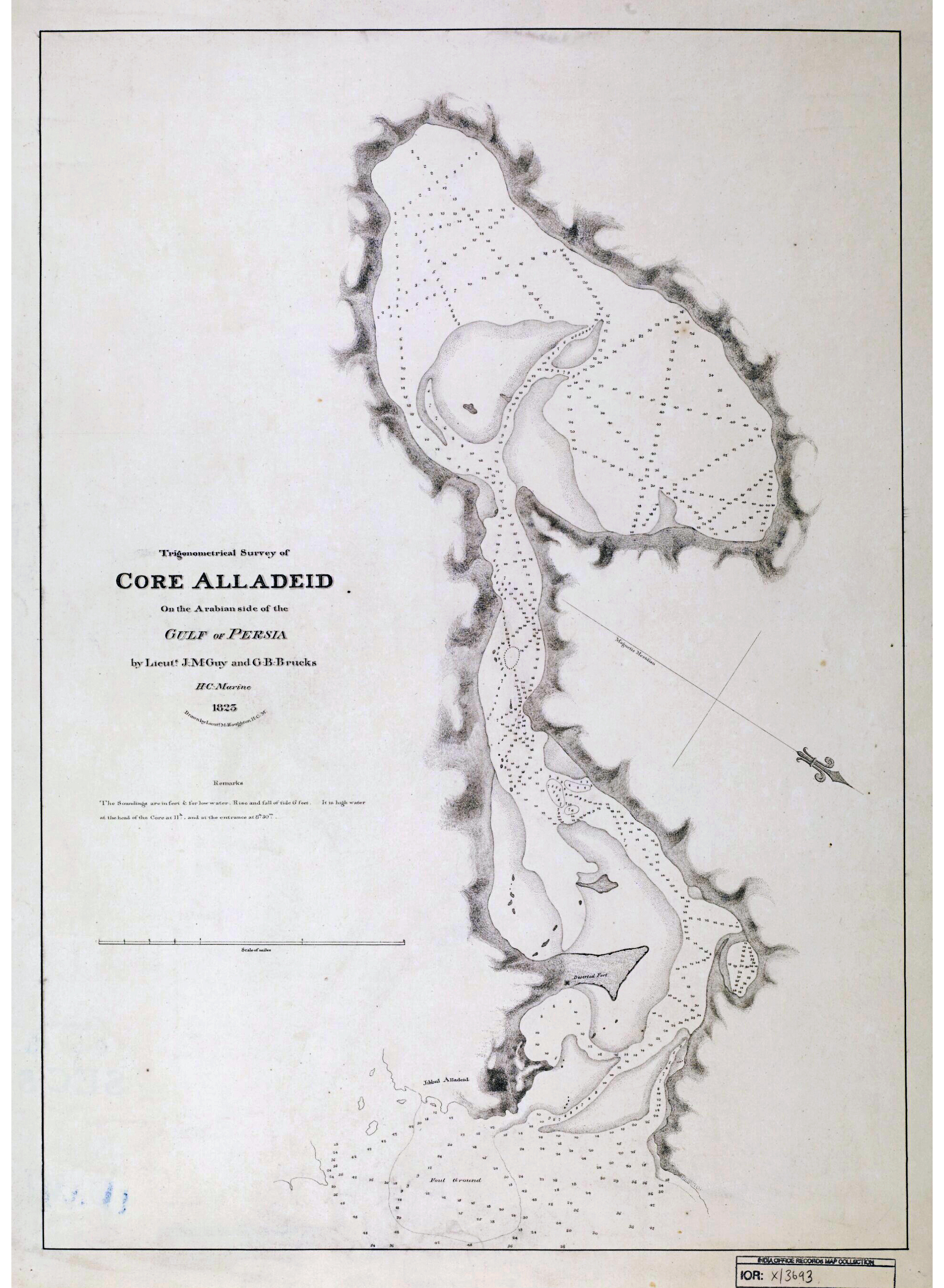
Trigonometrical survey of Khor Al Adaid in 1823.

Among the settlers in 1835 was the pirate Jasim bin Jabir, who was joined there by his crew. The residents of eastern Qatar abetted the pirates of Khor Al Adaid in their pillaging of vessels off the coast of Abu Dhabi, resulting in a British naval force being sent to the settlement in 1836 to accost the piratical acts. The British ordered the chiefs of major Qatari towns to immediately desist from sending supplies to the pirates and instructed them to seize the pirate's boats. Additionally, the British naval force set fire to one of the pirate's vessels. As a result, Jassim bin Jabir relocated to Doha in September 1836.

After receiving approval from the British in May 1837, the Sheikh of Abu Dhabi, wishing to punish the seceders, sent his troops to sack the settlement at Khor Al Adaid; 50 of its inhabitants were killed and its houses and fortifications were dismantled during the event. The British claimed that "the leniency and moderation with which he [the Sheikh] used his victory induced the seceders to return to Abu Dhabi".

In 1851, after arriving on the Qatari coast in preparation to invade Bahrain, the Saudi ruler Faisal bin Turki notified Sultan bin Saqr Al Qasimi of Sharjah, Maktoum bin Butti bin Suhail of Dubai, and Saeed bin Mutlaq Al-Mutairi that he was going to launch a massive reconstruction effort in Khor Al Adaid.

In 1869, the Bani Yas tribe once again seceded from Abu Dhabi to resettle in Khor Al Adaid under Sheikh Buttye-bin-Khadim. According to a description of Khor Al Adaid made sometime after this migration, the colony was inhabited by approximately 200 Bani Yas tribespeople who owned a total 30 pearling ships. The area was well protected, containing a small fort with two towers in the center of the town.

=== Ottoman control ===
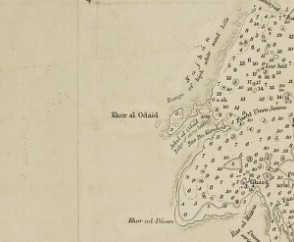
1860 map showing the location of Khor Al Adaid.

The Qatari Peninsula came under Ottoman control in late 1871 after Sheikh Jassim bin Mohammed Al Thani, recognized as ruler of the peninsula, agreed to Ottoman control in exchange for protection from the Sheikhs of Bahrain and Abu Dhabi and agreed to fly the Ottoman flag at his palace. In January 1872, Qatar was formally incorporated into the Ottoman Empire as a province in Najd with Sheikh Jassim being appointed its kaymakam (sub-governor). According to a British memorandum written in 1879 by Adolphus Warburton Moore, "in August 1873 they [the Ottomans] were reported by the Acting Resident in the Persian Gulf to have established an influence over all the Guttur coast as far as the Odeid boundaries".

For his part, Buttye-bin-Khadim, sheikh of the Bani Yas at Khor Al Adaid, refused to submit to Abu Dhabi, and stated that his people were in their own right at Odeid, and independent of both Qatar and the Ottomans. The territorial limits of the colony were declared to extend from Ras-al-Hala, midway to Wakrah in Qatar, continuously along the southern coast through Odeid to a point abreast of the island of Sir Bani Yas. He further claimed the island of Dalma and other islets within that circuit. He asserted that this territory constituted the ancient home of the Al-Kubaisat. He then admitted he had been offered the Turkish flag by Sheikh Jassim, but had refused it, saying he was under British protection. Communications between British officials reveal that rumors persisted that Sheikh Buttye-bin-Khadim flew the Ottoman flag on Fridays. These rumors were later found to be true, with future communiques confirming the occasional hoisting of the Ottoman flag in Khor Al Adaid.

In June 1873, Sheikh Zayed bin Khalifa Al Nahyan of Abu Dhabi wrote to the British Political Resident in the Persian Gulf requesting permission to launch a naval invasion of Khor Al Adaid, but was rejected by the British government. He requested permission again in November 1874, but was informed that the British government could not permit such a proceeding. This was despite his claims to have recently received letters from Ottoman local officials claiming that Khor Al Adaid was under their protection.

==== Piracy incidents ====
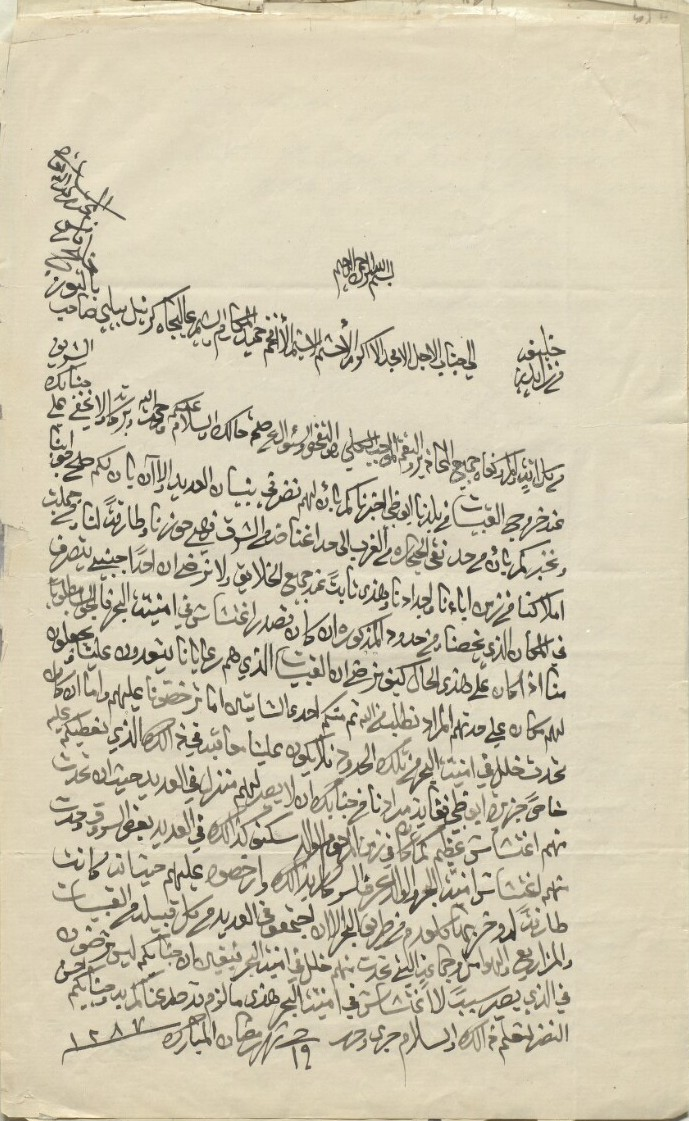
Letter in Arabic from Sheikh Zayed to Lewis Pelly, dated 19 Ramadhan 1287 (13 December 1870), regarding the recent resettlement of Khor Al Adaid by the Al Kubaisat tribe.

Shortly after the peninsula came under Ottoman control, the British government reprimanded the Ottomans on numerous occasions for failing to prevent piratical acts from being carried out off Khor Al Adaid's coast. Adolphus Warburton Moore's memo states, "During the summer of 1876 there was a marked increase of piratical acts along the Guttur coast." Select instances are given:

- "In the month of August a rumour reached the Officiating Resident, to the effect that another party of the Beni Hajir had seized a boat belonging to the Oman pearl divers at Odeid."
- "In the same month the Chief of Aboothabee complained that two of his boats, which had anchored in the Bay of Odeid, had been attacked from the shore, one man being wounded, and one killed."
- "Again in August a section of the Beni Hajir, residing at Odeid, under the rule of Sheikh Salim bin Shafee, embarked from that port, and made an attack upon a boat belonging to Guttur, from which property to the value of $400 was plundered."

The British memo also mentions the 1869 defection of the Bani Yas tribe from the Sheikh of Abu Dhabi and subsequent resettlement of Khor Al Adaid. Discussing the Sheikh's response to their defection, the memo states:

In regard to these dissidents Colonel Prideaux wrote (16th September 1876): "The Chief of Aboothabee, though naturally incensed at the defection of his tribesmen, has throughout behaved with praiseworthy moderation and forbearance; and although by frequent appeals to this Residency he continues to assert his claims upon Odeid, he has never attempted to enforce them by any act which might be deemed inconsistent with his treaty obligations." I do not doubt that if the question at issue were simply between the Chief of Aboothabee and his refractory tribesmen, it might be satisfactorily arranged without any great difficulty but it is to some degree complicated by the fact that the Chief of Odeid is in possession of a Turkish flag which he occasionally hoists, and under the protection of which it is believed that he would voluntarily place himself if any attempt were made to coerce him.

In addition to hoisting the Ottoman flag (alongside the Trucial flag), it was found that the Sheikh of Khor Al Adaid had been paying an annual tribute of 40 to 50 dollars to the Ottomans through Sheikh Jassim around 1877. Although Khor Al Adaid had likely been under Ottoman protection for two to three years by that point, aside from the small contingent of Ottoman officials who came to settle terms, there was no Ottoman presence in the village to speak of. This absence was mainly attributed to the area's limited potable water availability.

==== British response to piracy ====
The British, after conducting an investigation into these so-called piratical acts, concluded that the culprits were not the Bani Hajer, but the Al Murrah tribe; and that the Sheikh of Khor Al Adaid had not been implicated, but that "he was too weak to prevent his ports being made use of". Colonel Prideaux, who was the acting Persian Gulf Resident in Edward Charles Ross' absence, suggested that the British should facilitate a reconciliation between the Bani Yas in Khor Al Adaid and the Sheikh of Abu Dhabi so that the area, including its territorial waters, would fall under the umbrella of British protection. He claimed that, should this prove unsuccessful, the British government would do well to provide assistance to the Sheikh of Abu Dhabi in exercising his authority over the land, by force if necessary. He predicted that the Ottomans would not intervene.

After much deliberation, the British Government concurred with Colonel Prideaux's view and empowered the Resident to use his best endeavors to promote a reunion between the colonists at Khor Al Adaid and the main body of the Bani Yas tribe of Abu Dhabi, and further authorized him "to afford assistance, if necessary, to the Trucial Chief of Abuthabi in coercing the seceders." The British Government established the following facts regarding the piracy:

- That the acts of piracy complained of were committed by members of the Al Murrah tribe, a tribe nominally dependent on the Ottoman Government.
- That the pirates proceeded on their expedition from ports belonging to the Chief of Khor Al Adaid.
- That the Chief of Khor Al Adaid in no way countenanced or assisted the use of his ports as a starting place for piratical expeditions.
- That the reason why the Chief of Khor Al Adaid was too weak to prevent the piracy was due to his and his follower's secession from the Bani Yas tribe inhabiting Abu Dhabi.
- That the reason why the Chief of Abu Dhabi has not yet invaded Khor Al Adaid is, that he has been prevented from so doing by the British Government.

Accompanying these findings were two directives issued by the British Government:

- That endeavours be made to induce the Ottoman Government to take measures to restrain the piratical proceedings of the Al Murrah tribe; and
- That measures be taken by the Royal Navy to prevent the ports of Khor Al Adaid from being used as a rendezvous for pirates.

The British Government also instructed their liaison to the Ottomans, the British Ambassador in Constantinople Austen Henry Layard, to relay to the Ottoman Government the need to send forces to the weaker Sheikhs in Qatar so that they could subvert piracy in their ports, but the liaison was advised not to make any reference to Khor Al Adaid, "because it was doubtful whether the Turkish Government exercised any substantial authority over the Chief of that place, and it was inexpedient to provoke a discussion on the point." In June 1877, yet another act of piracy was committed by ships belonging to Khor Al Adaid upon sailors from Al Wakrah, several of whom were captured. Following the incident, Colonel Prideaux wrote to Sheikh Buttye-bin-Khadim of Khor Al Adaid warning him to accept reunification with the Bani Yas of Abu Dhabi, otherwise "other steps will be taken", while also writing to Sheikh Zayed of Abu Dhabi to reassure him of British support for his efforts to preside over the settlement at Khor Al Adaid.

In the aftermath of the piracy in June, Sheikh Buttye-bin-Khadim, while admitting his men forcibly captured sailors from Al Wakrah, did not comply with British demands to release the prisoners. Thus, in October 1877, Colonel Prideaux recommended sending warships to Khor Al Adaid as punishment for violating the Perpetual Maritime Truce, unless its inhabitants submit to the Sheikh of Abu Dhabi's rule. Edward Charles Ross informed the British Government in December that attempts at reconciliation between Sheikh Zayed and Sheikh Buttye-bin-Khadim were met without success.

==== Invasion and destruction ====
In 1878, it was reported that the British Government and the Sheikh of Abu Dhabi had made a plan to invade Khor Al Adaid, supposedly to curtail the piracy of its inhabitants. In response, Sheikh Jassim threatened to occupy Khor Al Adaid, as he had perceived the proposed military excursion to be in violation of Qatar's territorial integrity. Climatically, a massive invasion of Khor Al Adaid was launched by the Sheikh of Abu Dhabi in concert with the British in 1879. Recounting the incident, British records state that:

Sir A. Layard [Austen Henry Layard], writing on the 28th May, reported that Sadık Pasha, the Ottoman Minister for Foreign Affairs, had read to him a telegram from the Wali of Basra, complaining that Zaid-bin-Khalifa, with 70 boats and accompanied by an English war steamer and the British Consul at Bushire, had attacked Odeid, which he described as a dependency of the Turkish district of Catar (El-Katr). The inhabitants having fled, the village was pillaged and destroyed, and all the boats carried off. The Porte hoped that some explanation would be afforded of this descent upon Turkish territory. Lord Cranbrook, to whom the papers were referred, declined to give any detailed expression of opinion until he had consulted the Government of India; but in the meantime he drew the attention of the Foreign Office to the correspondence of 1877, in which the India Office recommended that a discussion with the Porte in regard to the status of Odeid should, if possible, be avoided.

In 1881, Sheikh Jassim once again announced to the Political Resident his intention to occupy Khor Al Adaid in order to re-inhabit it and to defend Qatar from pirates and naval invasions. After being reminded that the territory was under the protection of the British, he rescinded his plans. On 31 August 1886, it was reported that Sheikh Jassim and several of his followers departed Doha to settle Khor Al Adaid. He was warned against his plan by a British official, and the Royal Navy dispatched a vessel to prevent him from advancing. Eventually, he returned to Doha without establishing a settlement in Khor Al Adaid.

In April 1889, Sheikh Jassim sent a letter to the Wali of Basra in which he reported that Sheikh Zayed was preparing to invade Qatar and pleaded for support, claiming that Sheikh's Zayed's forces numbered close to 20,000 troops while he could barely muster 4,000 troops. Although the Wali believed that Sheikh Jassim was inflating figures for his own gain, he instructed Akif Pasha, Mutasarrıf of Najd Sanjak, to take preventative measures in Qatar by reinforcing Khor Al Adaid with 500 men. Before the troops were dispatched, Akif Pasha was summoned to Basra in August 1888 to discuss administrative reforms in Bahrain and Qatar with the Wali. During the meeting, Akif Pasha recommended appointing a mudir to Khor Al Adaid with a salary of 750 kurushes and a gendarmerie force. He claimed that this, along with other steps taken by the Porte, would result in the establishment of a thriving village in Khor Al Adaid which could potentially generate large amounts of tax revenue. Furthermore, he stated, such measures would help repel foreign incursions. However, the prime underlying motive behind these reforms were to reduce British influence in the Persian Gulf. After these decisions were written into a bill by the Council of Ministers, Sultan Abdul Hamid II, having received the bill on 13 January 1890, signed it into effect on 2 February 1890.

==== Resettlement attempts by the Ottomans and Sheikh Jassim ====
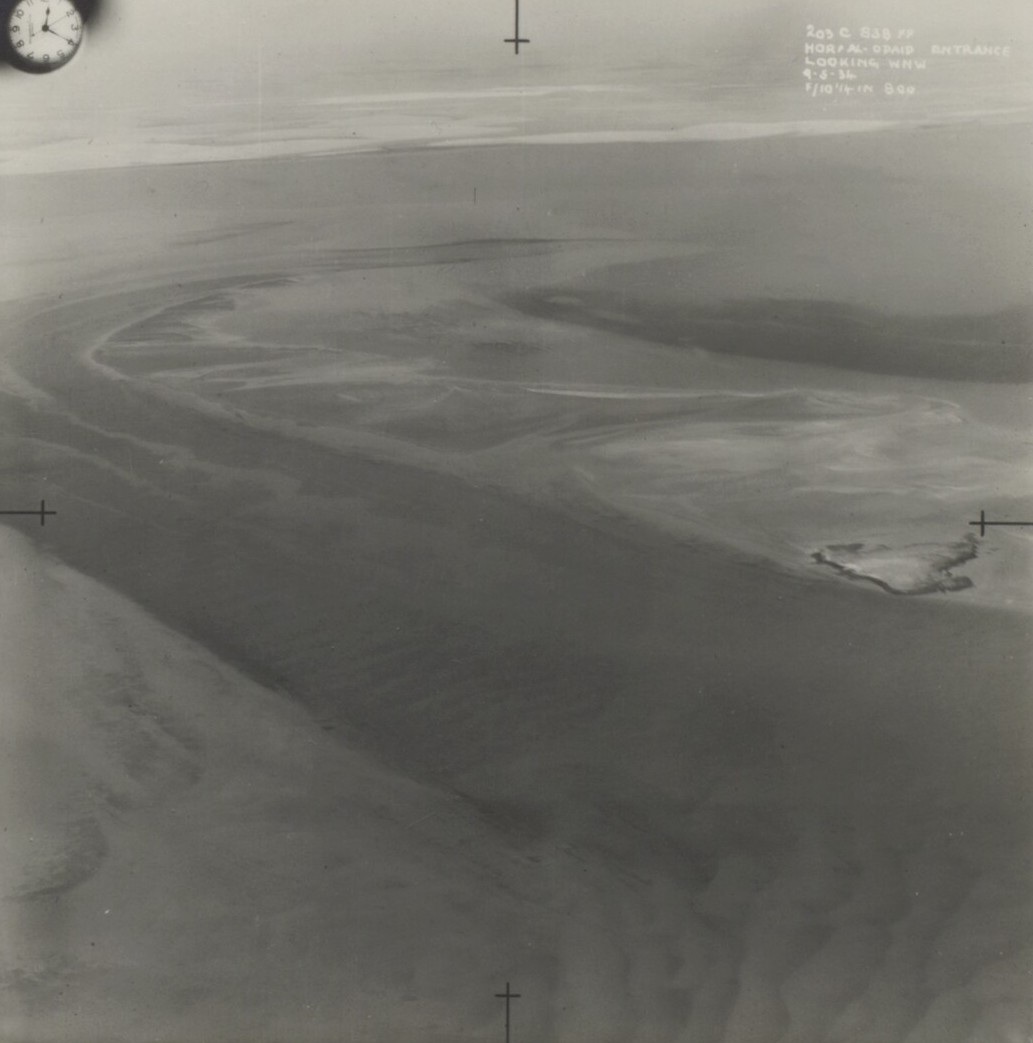
Entrance to Khor Al Adaid looking WNW, photographed during a reconnaissance mission by the Royal Air Force on 9 May 1934.

By 1890 news had broken about the newly commissioned project by the Ottomans to rebuild Khor Al Adaid. The British grew concerned over this as an Ottoman settlement in what they considered territory of Abu Dhabi would be exceedingly difficult to disperse through diplomatic means. In British political circles, rumors were circulating in January 1891 that the Ottomans had installed mudirs (governors) in Khor Al Adaid and north-bound Zubarah, and that 400 Ottoman troops were en route to garrison the towns. These rumors are confirmed by declassified communications between the Wali of Basra and the Office of the Grand Vizier exchanged in mid-January.

In February 1891, the British learnt that Sheikh Jassim, under the aegis of the Ottomans, had returned to his plans of occupying Khor Al Adaid. He reportedly asked around 40 members of the Kubaisat tribe living in Al Wakrah to settle in Khor Al Adaid in an attempt to rebuild the village. The tribe replied that they were willing to adhere to this proposal, provided that one of Jassim's sons serves as their sheikh, as most of the tribe members refused to live under an Ottoman governor. At the same time, Sheikh Jassim was under pressure by the Ottomans to agree to their proposals to install administrative officials at Khor Al Adaid and Zubarah and to establish a customs house at Al Bidda. While he was not overtly concerned about the first proposal as he had not yet found willing participants to resettle these two places, he vehemently opposed the establishment of an Ottoman customs house in Qatar. All prospects of resettling Khor Al Adaid were abandoned when Sheikh Jassim, unsatisfied with the increasing usurpation of control by the Ottomans, resigned as kaymakam of Qatar in August 1892. This culminated in the Battle of Al Wajbah in March 1893 in which Sheikh Jassim's forces defeated the Ottomans troops stationed in Doha, resulting in a downsizing of Ottoman presence in the peninsula.

==== Resettlement proposal by Sheikh Zayed ====
Sheikh Zayed of Abu Dhabi and Lieutenant-Colonel C. A. Kemball, Officiating Political Resident in the Persian Gulf, held a meeting in October 1903 in which they discussed the rebuilding and resettlement of Khor Al Adaid. In January 1904, the Assistant Political Agent in Bahrain received a letter from Sheikh Zayed regarding the same topic:

The rebuilding of Odeid will have a detrimental effect on Al Bidda and Wakra, from which places it will draw some of their residents. Odeid possesses one of the most secure harbours for native craft on this side of the Persian Gulf. It will become a centre for the pearl trade in that region much to the disadvantage of Al Bidda which now has a large share of the trade on account of its proximity to the central pearl banks. A new market will be opened for our enterprising British Indians who would probably share in the Katr pearl trade which is now exclusively in the hands of Sheikh Ahmed bin Thani and his nephews. The port is situated about thirty miles nearer to Bahrein than to Abu Dhabi for sailing vessels, so that possibly it will draw some of its supplies from Bahrein. And finally it will put an effectual stop to Turkish pretensions to it. The extra responsibility devolving upon His Majesty’s Government by the venture may be described as nominal only. After the severe check received by the Turks in their attempt on Bahrein in 1895 they will hardly lay themselves open again to any similar demoralizing rebuff by instigating the Katr Arabs to attack Odeid by sea and should they be so ill-advised as to do so, the Arabs of that region are not likely to listen to them after what they experienced on the occasion referred to. The only other danger is that it may be open to attack from the land side by raiding Bedouins. The nearest water-supply accessible to an hostile party is in the vicinity of Wajba about fifty miles away, so that an attempt would be attended with serious risks, the contingency is therefore remote in the extreme.

Sheikh Zayed wrote to the Political Resident, also in 1904, asking for permission to reoccupy Khor Al Adaid. He received a negative response from the British, according to a communique written by Assistant Secretary to the Government of India R. E. Holland which stated "that while the Government of India are prepared to prevent the place being occupied by anyone other than himself, they are not disposed under present conditions to assist him in reoccupying it."

==== Ottoman administrative reforms ====
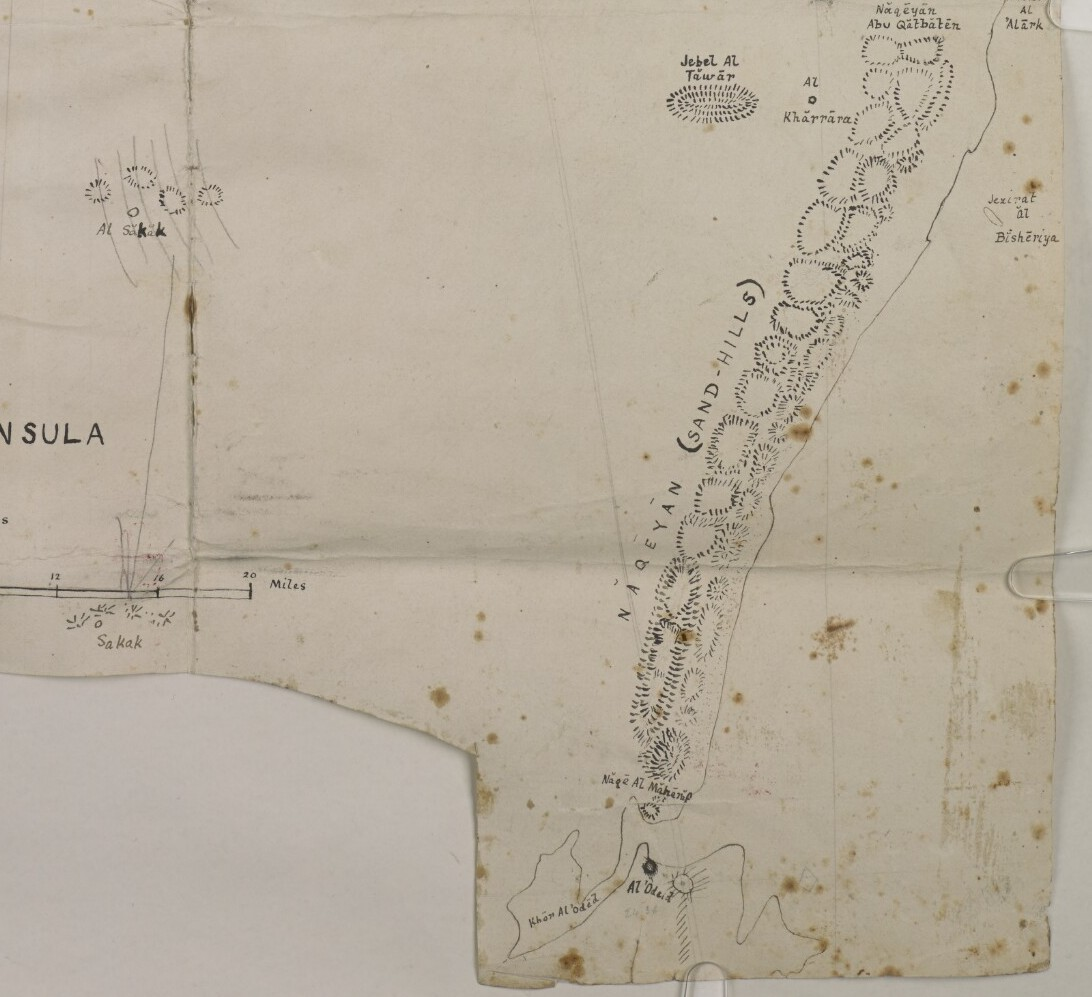
Rough depiction of the geography around Khor Al Adaid, including the Naqiyan hill range, circa. 1937.

More than thirty years after the Ottomans established a protectorate in the Qatari Peninsula, they designated four administrative districts (nehiye) on the peninsula in December 1902, with Khor Al Adaid (simply referred to as Adide by the Porte) being among them. Ottoman sources allege that this was in response to British disturbance of the nomadic tribespeople in Qatar by installing numerous poles in the peninsula, including five in Zubarah and Khor Al Adaid. The British officially protested and refused to recognize Ottoman jurisdiction over the peninsula, especially over Khor Al Adaid. They demanded that the Ottomans not station administrative officials in these districts, to which the Ottomans promised they would comply. However, by early 1903, the Ottomans had already appointed the first mudir – Yusuf Effendi in Al Wakrah.

Abdülkarim Vefik Efendi (known to British intelligence as Agha Abdul Karim bin Agha Hasan), a former tax official in Qatif, was the mudir-designate for Khor Al Adaid. In March 1903, British sources indicated that the mudir-designate was reassigned elsewhere. According to Lieutenant-Colonel C. A. Kemball, Abdülkarim Efendi requested a reassignment from the Mutasarrıf of al-Hasa after being made aware of the desolateness of Khor Al Adaid. Abdülkarim Efendi stated, according to Kemball, that a mudir of Kurdish origins had been assigned in his place and was awaiting orders in Basra. Amidst heavy pressure from the British to rescind their assignment of government officials in Qatar, the Porte abolished all its mudir posts on the peninsula in 1904.

It was reported that in August 1910, the Ottomans had again assigned a mudir in the peninsula, this time to the Khor Al Adaid district. British intelligence identified the mudir as Sulaiman Effendi. A British government official deemed this move "a determination to assert and extend Ottoman sovereignty over the neighbourhood of El Katr" and was instructed to hand in a written protest pointing out that "El Odeid is in the territory of one of the Trucial Chiefs who are under the protection of His Majesty’s Government”. However, when HMS Redbreast was sent to inspect Khor Al Adaid later that year, it found no evidence of an Ottoman mudir.

==== Later Ottoman period ====
A brief description of Khor Al Adaid is given in 1910 by W. Graham Greene:

Information about this locality is very meagre. Anchorage is reported to exist in from six to ten fathoms close to the shore of the northern entrance point of Khor al Odeid, which is described as a winding inlet five miles in length opening out into a lagoon about five miles long and three miles wide. Landing from boats would probably be easy on the shore of the inlet and lagoon, the depths of which vary considerably."

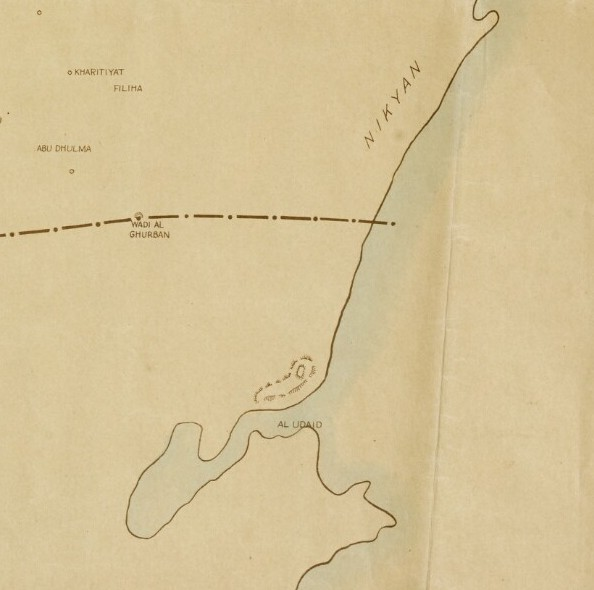
Sketch map dated 1933 depicting Khor Al Adaid and the Naqiyan hill range.

J. G. Lorimer's comprehensive Gazetteer of the Persian Gulf, published in 1908 and 1915 as a handbook for British political agents, offers a more complete account of Khor Al Adaid:

In English formerly known as "Khore Alladeid." An inlet or creek on the coast of the Abu Dhabi Principality at its extreme western end: it lies about 180 miles, almost due west, from the town of Abu Dhabi. The boundary of Qatar is either at, or a short distance to the north of, the inlet. [...] There are now no permanent inhabitants at 'Odaid, and it is not visited by Bedouins from the interior; but fishermen from Abu Dhabi spend some months here in winter, and fine mullet are caught by them. A village occupied by seceders from Abu Dhabi; of the Qubaisat section of the Bani Yas, has existed at Odaid at various times. The village was situated on the south side of the creek at a short distance from the entrance and consisted of about 100 houses: the inhabitants lived by fishing and obtained their drinking water from 4 wells which were less than a mile from the place and contained brackish water at 2 fathoms below the surface; they had no dates or cultivation. Prior to 1866 the defenses of this village consisted of a fort with two towers, of 7 other detached towers, and of blockhouses protecting the wells. The settlement was finally abandoned in 1880.

=== Later 20th century ===
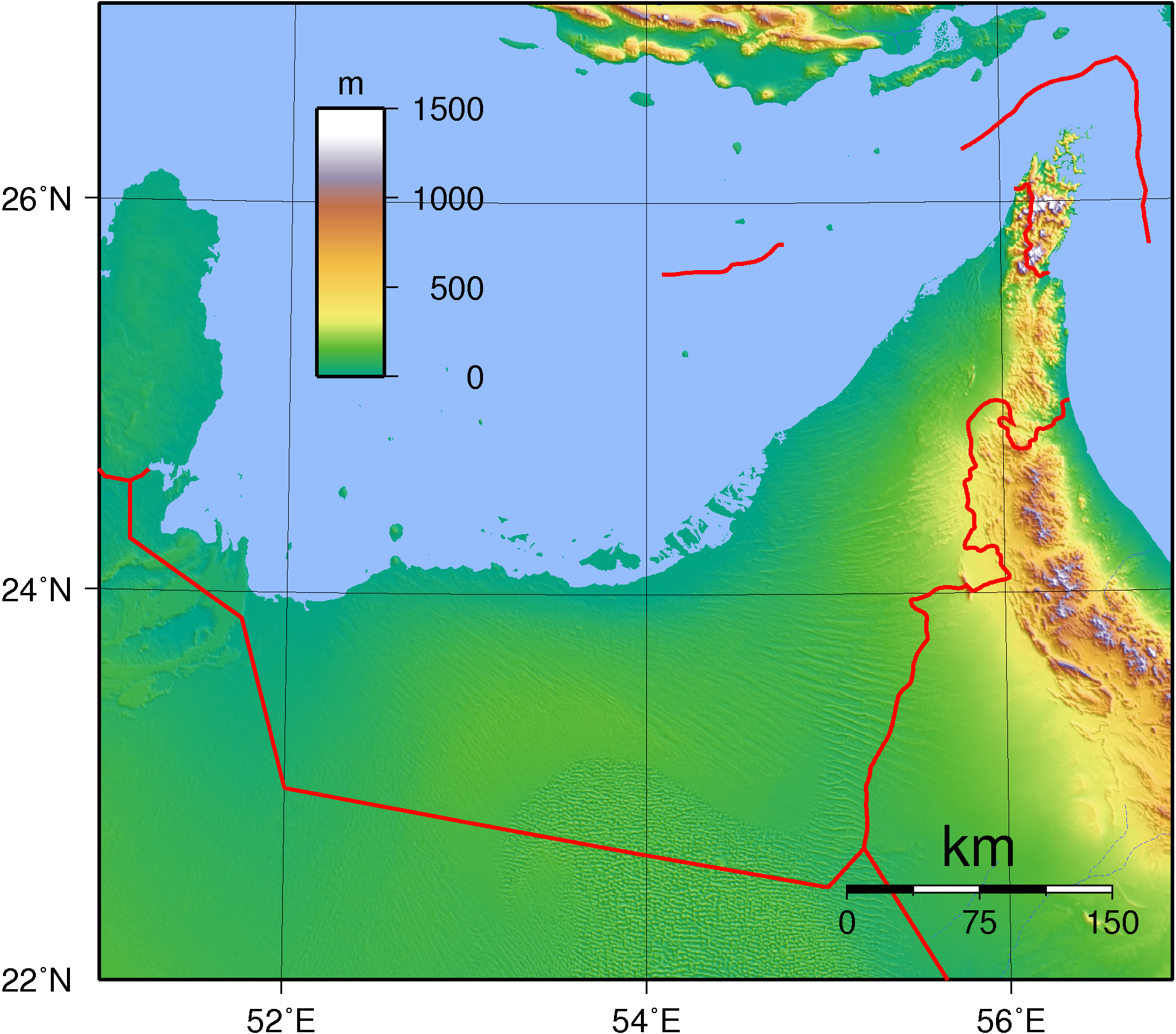
Topographic map of the United Arab Emirates; note that the boundary shown in this map touches Khor Al Adaid in Qatar, as it was before the 1974 agreements.

Throughout the 20th century, Khor Al Adaid was the focus of border disputes between Qatar, Saudi Arabia and the UAE. The UAE Emirate of Abu Dhabi desired to have a border with Qatar here, but it was agreed in 1974 that Khor Al Adaid should border Saudi Arabia instead. However, that did not stop the issue from continuing into the 21st century, with the UAE and Saudi Arabia holding another discussion regarding Khor Al Adaid and their borders in 2005.

=== 21st century ===
In November 2021, Saudi Arabia and Qatar demarcated the Qatar–Saudi Arabia border and Qatar was given access to the entirety of Khor Al Adaid by moving the border further south.

== Geography ==
Khor Al Adaid is located in the southwestern extremity of Qatar in Al Wakrah Municipality. It forms the southern boundary of the southern desert region, which occupies 34.7% of Qatar's total area. Of the four sub-regions of the southern desert, Khor Al Adaid is a part of the sand dunes sub-group. The area is characterized by uneven terrain and sand dunes reaching heights of 38 metres (125 ft) to 67 metres (220 ft).

In terms of regional geography, Khor Al Adaid makes up a part of the broader Trucial Coast region, characterized by shallow, evaporative environments where carbonate sediments actively form. The area's coastal landscape is diverse, featuring sabkhas and tidal flats along the shoreline, with land-attached beaches and southward-prograding spits. Moving seaward, the environment transitions to open-marine subtidal sediments rich in mollusc remains. The eastern Qatar coastline also hosts isolated coral reef banks and ooid deposits. Unlike much of the Trucial Coast, where onshore winds prevail, Khor Al Adaid experiences predominantly offshore winds. This wind pattern influences the local geography, allowing quartz-rich eolian dunes to move towards the shoreline. Consequently, the coastal deposits in the Khor Al Adaid area primarily comprise siliciclastic sand, with small amounts of carbonate shell material.

The khor (inlet) at Khor Al Adaid consists of a winding channel, 9.7 km (6 miles) long, which runs inland in a south-westerly direction; within it opens out into a lagoon 9.7 km (6 miles) long from north-north-east to south-south-west and 4.8 km (3 miles) wide. The lagoon contains soundings of as much as 6 fathoms; but ordinary vessels on account of reefs, cannot approach within 4.8 km (3 miles) of the entrance of the khor. A ridge of stony hills, 91 m (300 feet) high on the south side of the entrance, is called Jabal Al 'Odaid; and on the north side of the creek, overlooking it, are sand hills known as Niqa Al Maharaf. Niqa Al Maharaf forms the southern extremity of a narrow range of high white sand hills skirting the coast known as Naqiyan, with the northern extremity going by the name Naqiyan Abu Qasbatain.

In a 2010 survey of Khor Al Adaid's coastal waters conducted by the Qatar Statistics Authority, it was found that its average depth was 4 meters (13 ft) and its average pH was 7.93. The waters had a salinity of 57.09 psu, an average temperature of 26.13 °C (79 °F) and 6.02 mg/L of dissolved oxygen.

=== Nature reserve ===
The UNESCO-recognized Khor Al Adaid Reserve is Qatar's largest nature reserve. Also known by its English name Inland Sea, the area was declared a nature reserve in 2007 and occupies an area of approximately 1,833 km^{2} (708 sq mi). Historically, the area was used for camel grazing by nomads, and is still used for the same purpose to a lesser extent. Various flora and fauna are supported in its ecosystem, such as ospreys, dugongs and turtles. The appearance and the quick formation of its sabkhas is distinct from any other system of sabkhas, as is the continuous infilling of its lagoon.

== Tourism ==
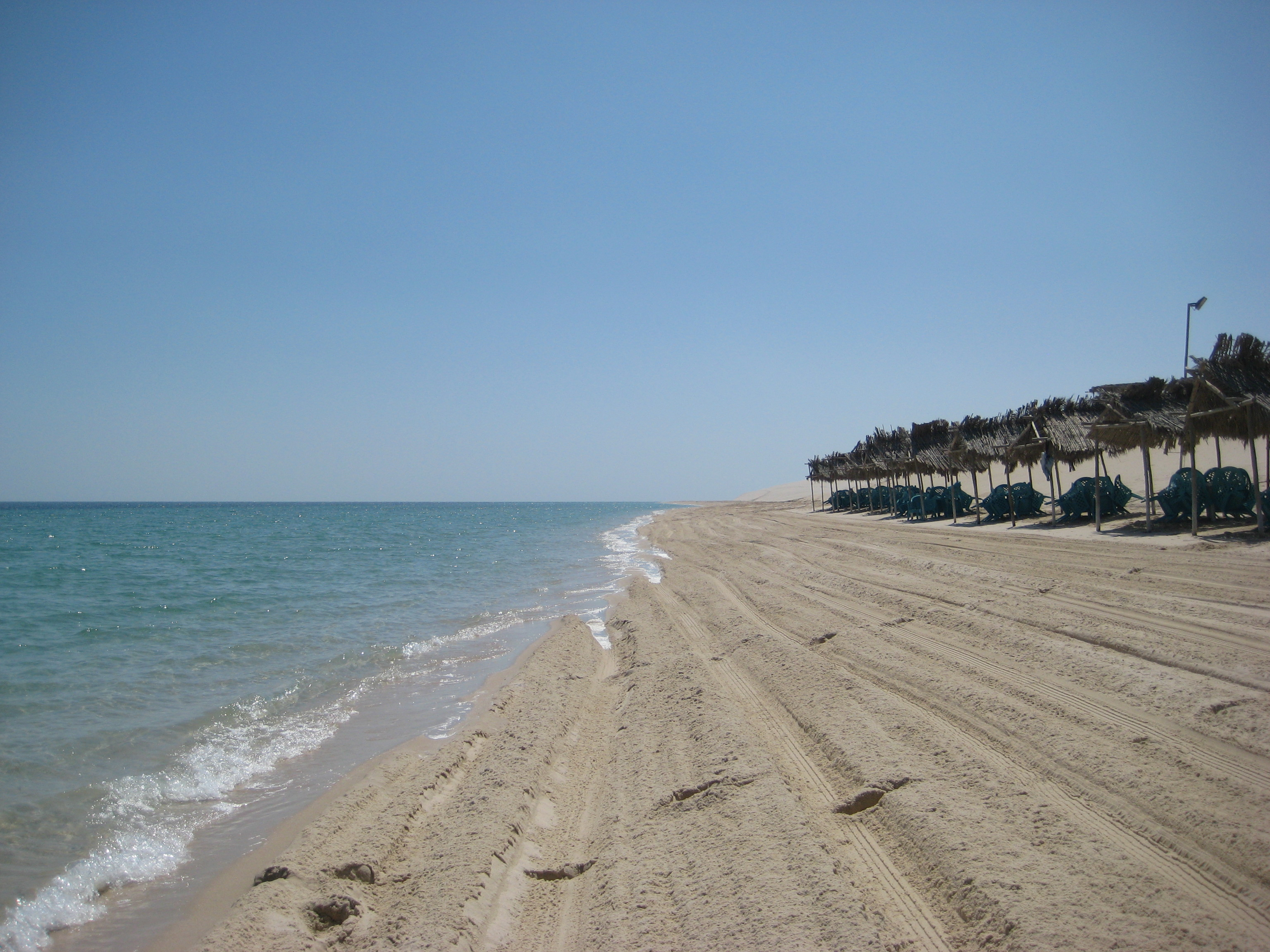
The beach in Khor Al Adaid.

Khor Al Adaid's beach is a popular tourist attraction in Qatar. The most common routes to the beach are via Mazrat Turaina and Mesaieed.

== Demographics ==
As of the 2010 census, the settlement comprised 14 housing units and 4 establishments. There were 42 people living in the settlement, of which all were male. Out of the 42 inhabitants, all were 20 years of age or older. The literacy rate stood at 64.3%.

Employed people made up the entire population.

Year	Population
2010	42
2015	7
