= Rawdat Abal Heeran =

Rawdat Abal Heeran روضة أبا الحيران
- District
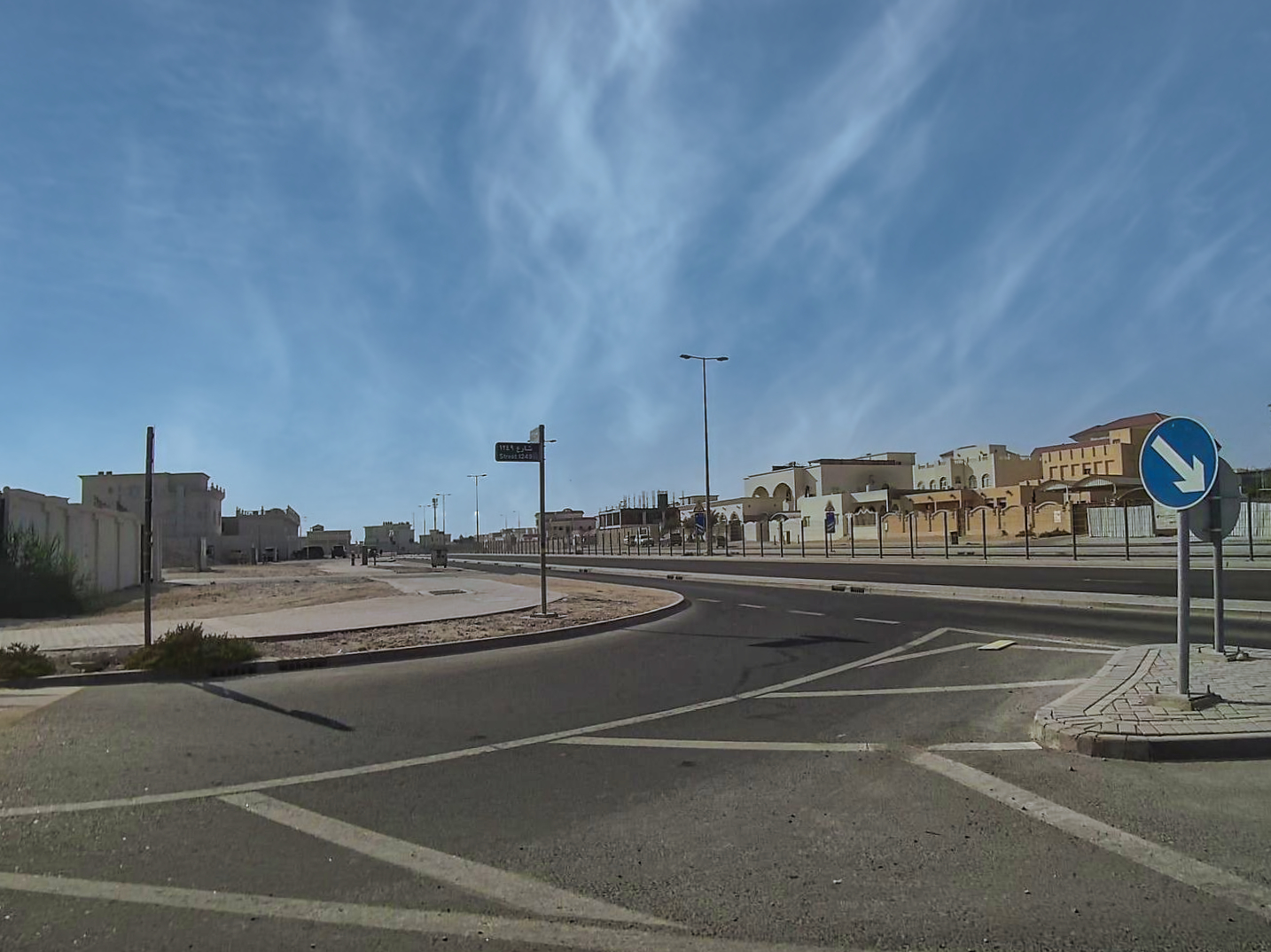
- Intersection of Street 1249 and Street 1260 in Rawdat Abal Heeran

- Location within Qatar
- Coordinates: 25.261043°N 51.3333°E
- Country: Qatar
- Municipality: Al Rayyan
- Zone: Zone 53
- District no.: 67

Area
  - Total: 8.0 km^{2} (3.1 sq mi)
- Elevation: 121 m (397 ft)

Rawdat Abal Heeran (Arabic: روضة أبا الحيران) is a rural district in Qatar, located in the municipality of Al Rayyan. It is situated in Zone 53, along with Al Wajbah, New Al Rayyan and Muaither.

== Etymology ==
The Arabic term rawda refers to depressions which act as reservoirs for surface runoff and thus are rich in plant life. Abal is derived from the Arabic abu, meaning "father of"; this is commonly used as a prefix for geographical features in Qatar. Finally, the term Arabic term heeran translates to "young camels". This name was given to the area on account of the numerous camels which historically grazed in the area.

== Development ==
The Public Works Authority (Ashghal) completed the Rawdat Abal Heeran Infrastructure Project in March 2018. The project, at a cost of QR 989 million, witnessed the construction of approximately 68 km of road and pedestrian paths as well as mosques and green spaces to serve about 2,622 residential plots.
