= Baghdad vilayet =

First-level administrative division of the Ottoman Empire

Coordinates: 33°21′0″N 44°25′0″E

Baghdad Vilayet Arabic: ولاية بغداد Ottoman Turkish: ولايت بغداد Vilâyet-i Bagdad
- Vilayet of Ottoman Empire
- 1864–1918
- Flag

- The Baghdad Vilayet in 1900
- Capital: Baghdad
- Demonym: Bagdadi
- Area
  - 1885: 141,160 km^{2} (54,500 sq mi)
- Population
  - 1885: 850,000
- History
  - Vilayet Law: 1864
  - Armistice of Mudros: 1918
Preceded by	Succeeded by
Baghdad Eyalet	Mandatory Iraq
- Today part of: Iraq

The Vilayet of Baghdad (Arabic: ولاية بغداد; Ottoman Turkish: ولايت بغداد, romanized: 'Vilâyet-i Bagdad; Modern Turkish: Bağdat Vilâyeti) was a first-level administrative division (vilayet) of the Ottoman Empire in Ottoman Iraq, corresponding largely to modern-day central Iraq. The capital was Baghdad.

At the beginning of the 20th century, it reportedly had an area of 54,503 square miles (141,160 km^{2}), while the preliminary results of the first Ottoman census of 1885 (published in 1908) gave the population as 850,000. The accuracy of the population figures ranges from "approximate" to "merely conjectural" depending on the region from which they were gathered.

== Demographics ==
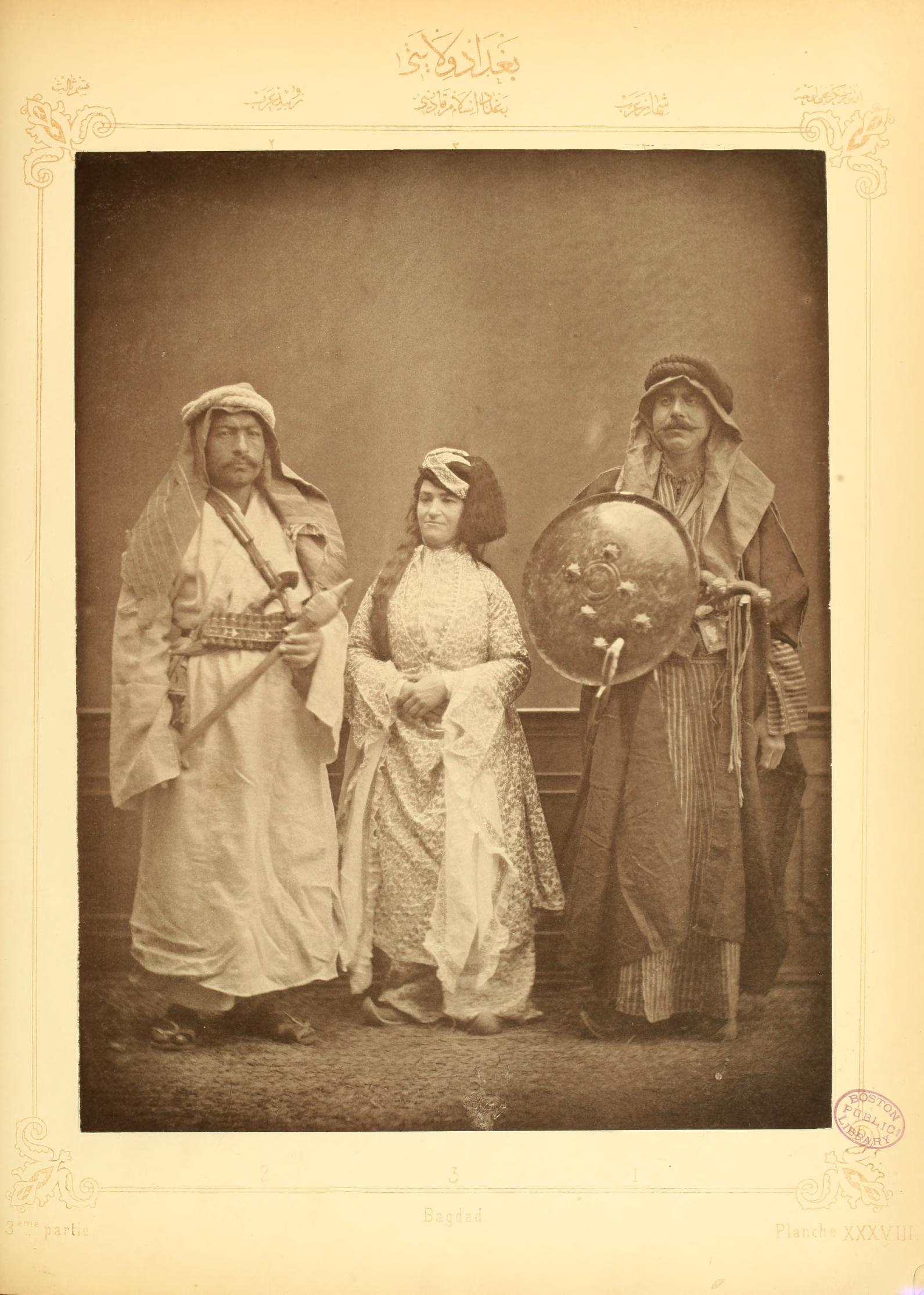
1. Arab man from Shammar Tribe; 2. Arab man from Zubaid tribe; 3. Muslim lady from Baghdad

Census of the Ottoman Empire (1906-1907).
Baghdad vilayet	Male	Female	Total
Muslims	159,129	3,814	162,943
Armenians	373		373
Armenian Catholics	723		723
Protestants	40		40
Latins	55	2	57
Syriacs	327		327
Jews	13,621	94	13,715
Total	174,268	3,910	178,178

The last Ottoman Census of 1917 stated that in Baghdad Sanjak out of the 202,000 population, 88,000 were Jews, 8,000 Kurd, 12,000 Christians, 800 Persian and rest Arab and other Muslims.

Population of Baghdad according to Ottoman Yearbook 1917						
Sanjak/Kaza	Jews	Kurd	Christians	Arab,Turks and other Muslims	Persian	Total
Baghdad Sanjak	88,000	8,000	12,000	101,400	800	202,000

== History ==
In 1869, Midhat Pasha was inaugurated as governor of Baghdad. He extended Ottoman jurisdiction as far as the town of al-Bida, after he had established his authority in Nejd. In January 1872, Qatar was designated as a kaza under the Sanjak of Nejd. However, relations with the Ottoman authorities became hostile in both al-Bida and Nejd, leading eventually to the Battle of Al Wajbah, at which Ottomans were defeated.

== Administrative divisions ==
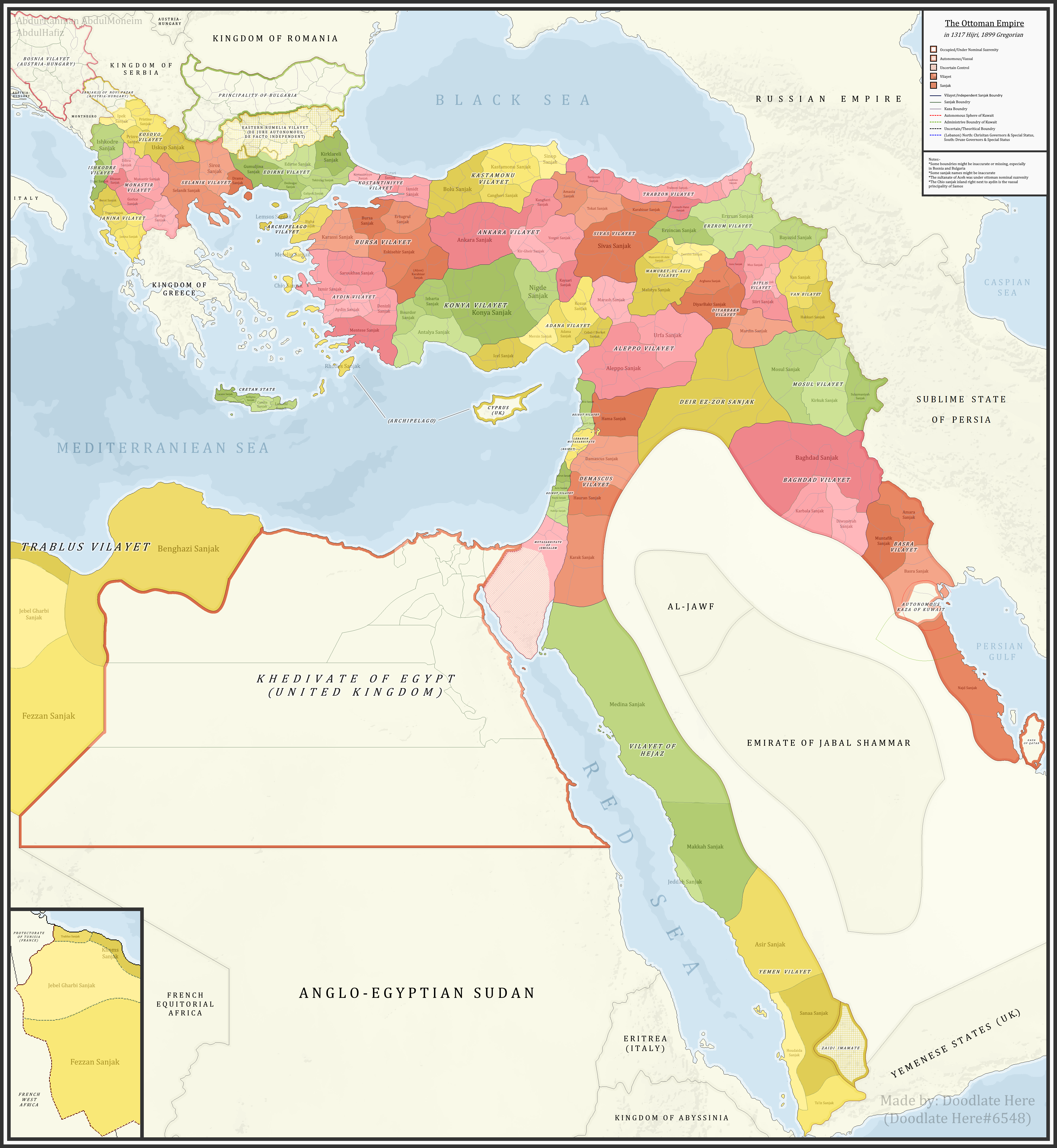
A map showing the administrative divisions of the Ottoman Empire in 1317 Hijri, 1899 Gregorian, Including the Vilayet of Baghdad and its sanjaks

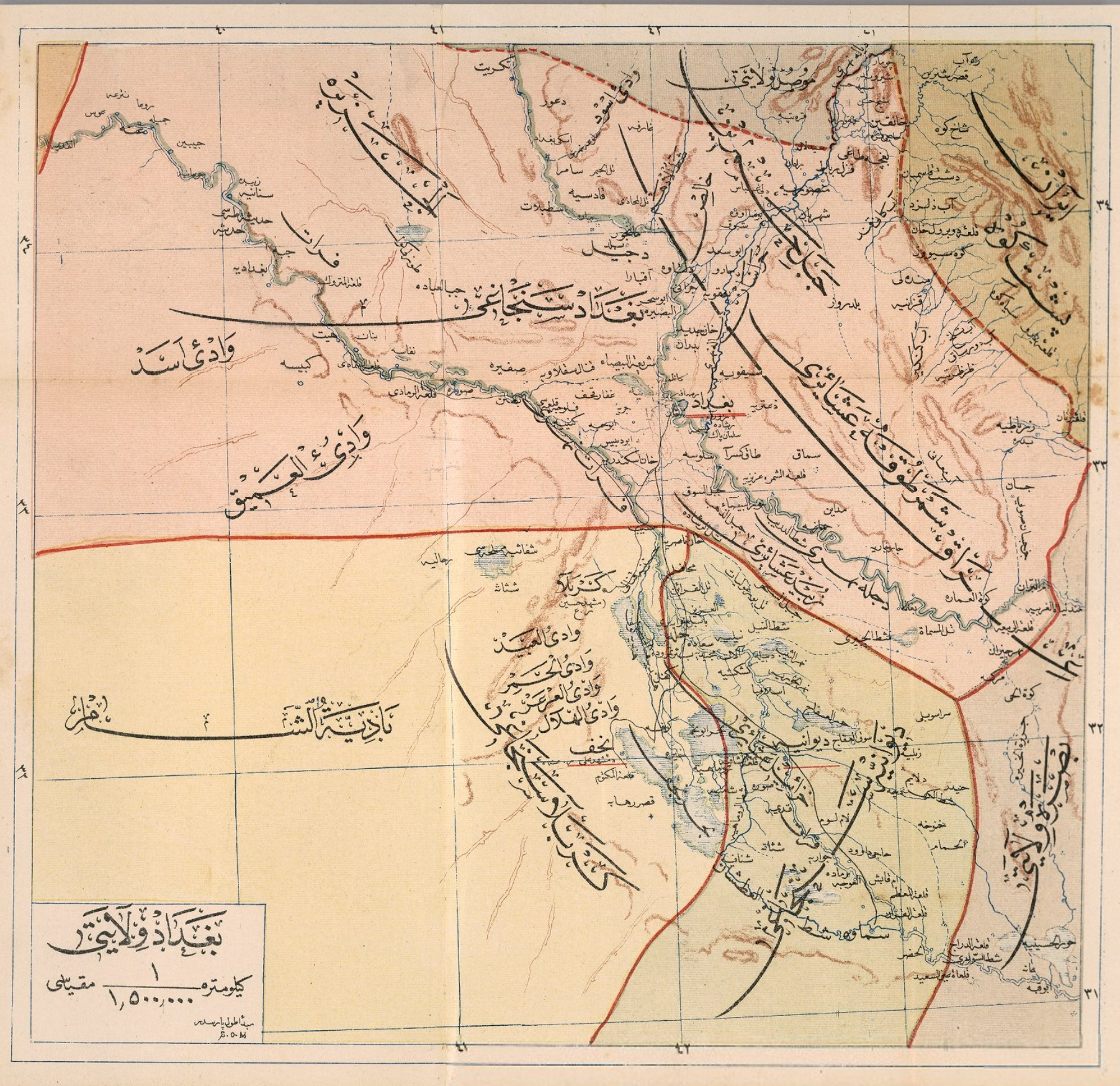
Map of subdivisions of Baghdad Vilayet in 1907

Sanjaks or Districts of the vilayet:

Sanjak of Bagdad, four zones
Sanjak	Currently
Baghdad Sanjak	Baghdad
Divaniye Sanjak	Al Diwaniyah
Kerbela Sanjak	Karbala
Najd Sanjak	June 1871 - 1875, then part of the Basra Vilayet)

== Governors ==
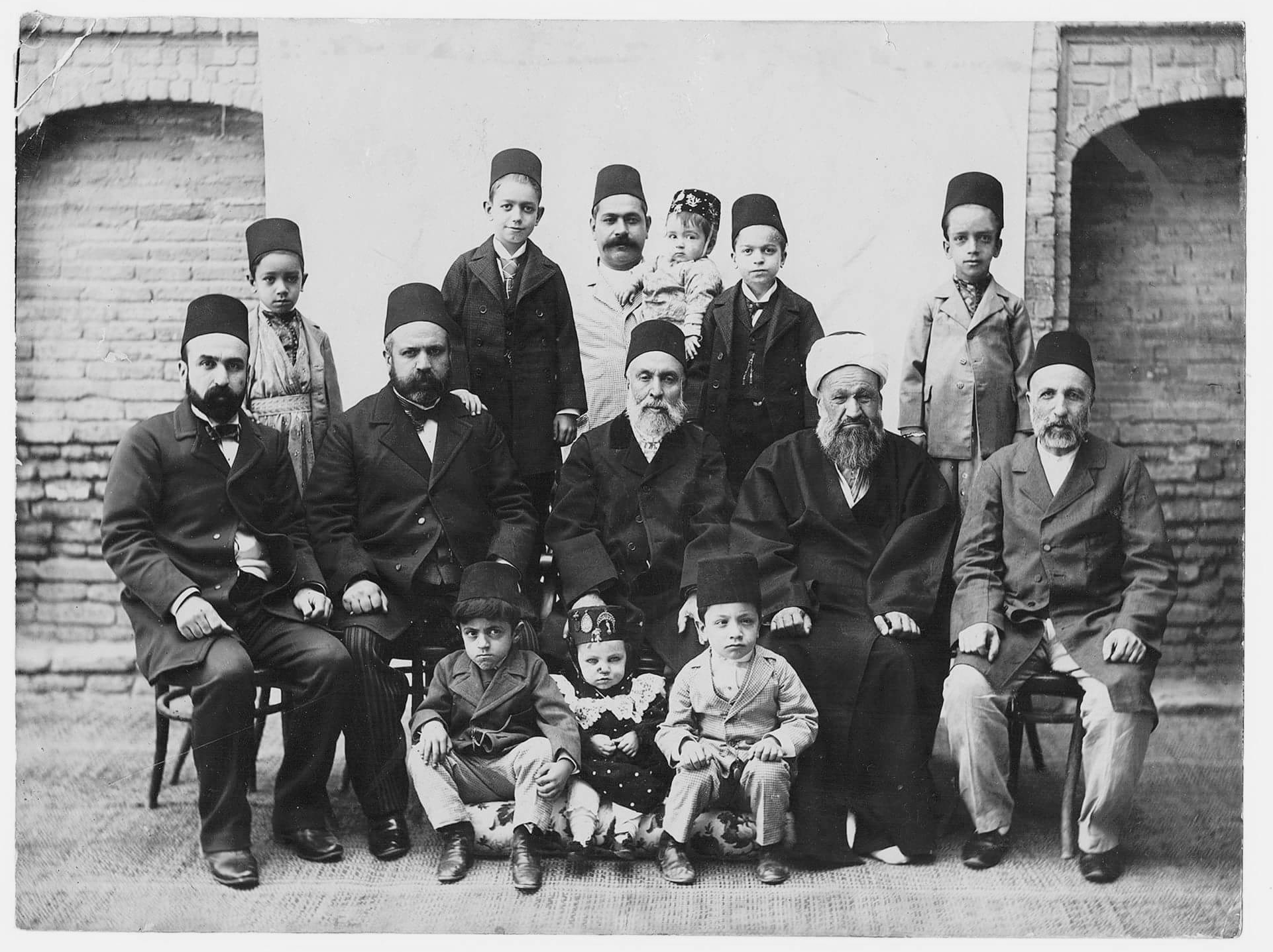
Governor Al-Shakir Effendi's family in Baghdad, 1901

Notable governors of the Vilayet:

- Hafiz Ahmed Midhat Shefik Pasha (March 1869 - November 1871)
- Giritli Sırrı Pasha

== See also ==
- List of Ottoman governors of Baghdad
