= Al Wajbah Fort =

Fort in Al Rayyan, Qatar

Coordinates: 25°18′6.16″N 51°23′38.59″E

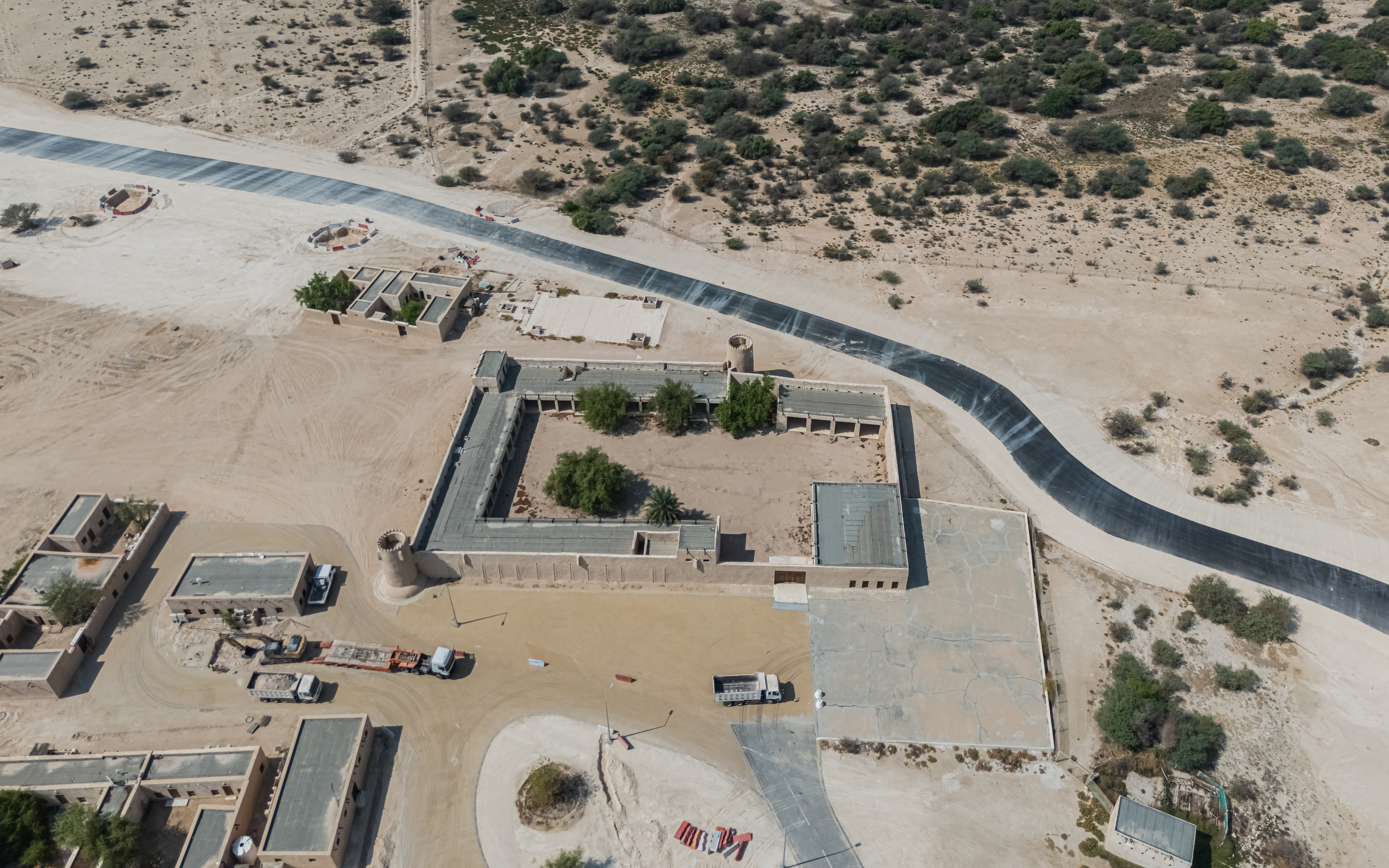
Aerial view of Al Wajbah Fort

Al Wajbah Fort is one of the oldest forts in Qatar. Located in the locality of Al Wajbah in Al Rayyan, it is situated 15 km (9.3 mi) west of Doha. The fort was built in the late 18th or 19th century and was the location of an important battle when the army of Sheikh Jassim bin Mohammed Al Thani subdued the Ottoman army in 1893 during the Battle of Al Wajbah. It was used as the residence of Hamad bin Abdullah Al Thani at various periods. The fort's most prominent features are its four watchtowers. It underwent restoration in the later 20th century.

== History ==
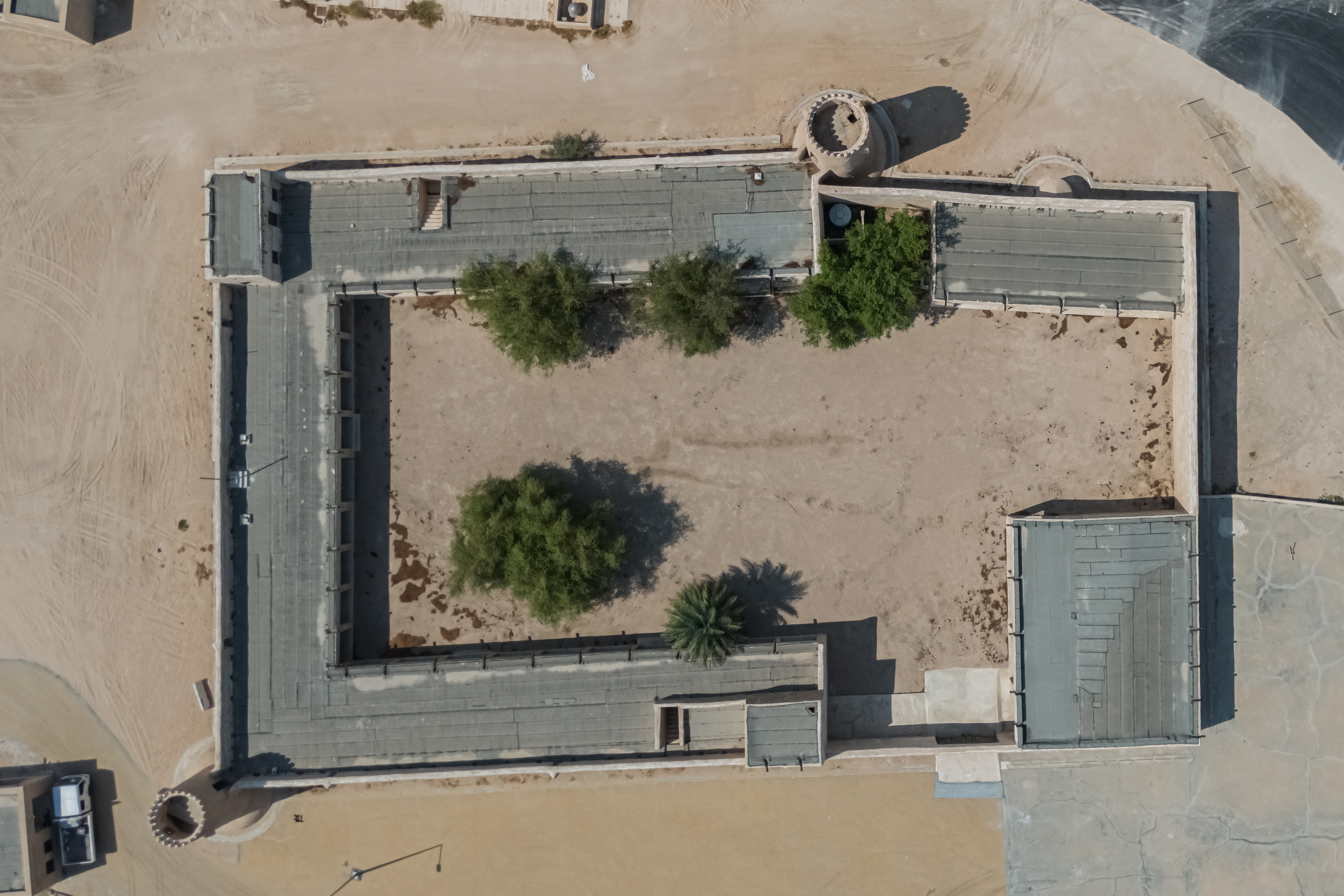
Overhead view of the fort in 2024

It is unknown exactly when Al Wajbah Fort was built, but it is thought to date back either to the late 18th century or the 19th century. At the time, Al Wajbah was a popular spot for the local Bedouins to graze their camels owing to its relative abundance of greenery compared to other nearby localities. In 1893, after sheikh Jassim bin Mohammed Al Thani stopped paying taxes to the Ottomans, they sent a contingent to confront him. This culminated in the Battle of Al Wajbah, in which the Ottoman soldiers were defeated and forced to retreat to Doha, about three hours away.

== Architecture ==
Rectangular in shape, the fortress measures 34 metres (112 ft) in length and 19 metres (62 ft) in width. The fort has four towers—two round and two rectangular. The round towers feature serrated upper platforms and shooting openings, whilst the rectangular ones lack such features. Drainage systems integrated into the fortress walls efficiently manage rainwater runoff.

Constructed primarily from hard limestone and clay, the fortress walls are plastered with gypsum. Inside, nineteen rooms on the lower level and upper chambers within the towers once served various purposes, including housing, worship, and assembly. Despite unauthorized modifications in the past, efforts in 1990 by the Museums and Archeology Department of the National Council for Culture, Arts and Heritage restored the fortress to its original state, removing alterations and reinforcing structural integrity.

== See also ==
- Battle of Al Wajbah
