= Anglo-Ottoman Convention of 1913 =

Agreement between the Ottoman Empire and the United Kingdom

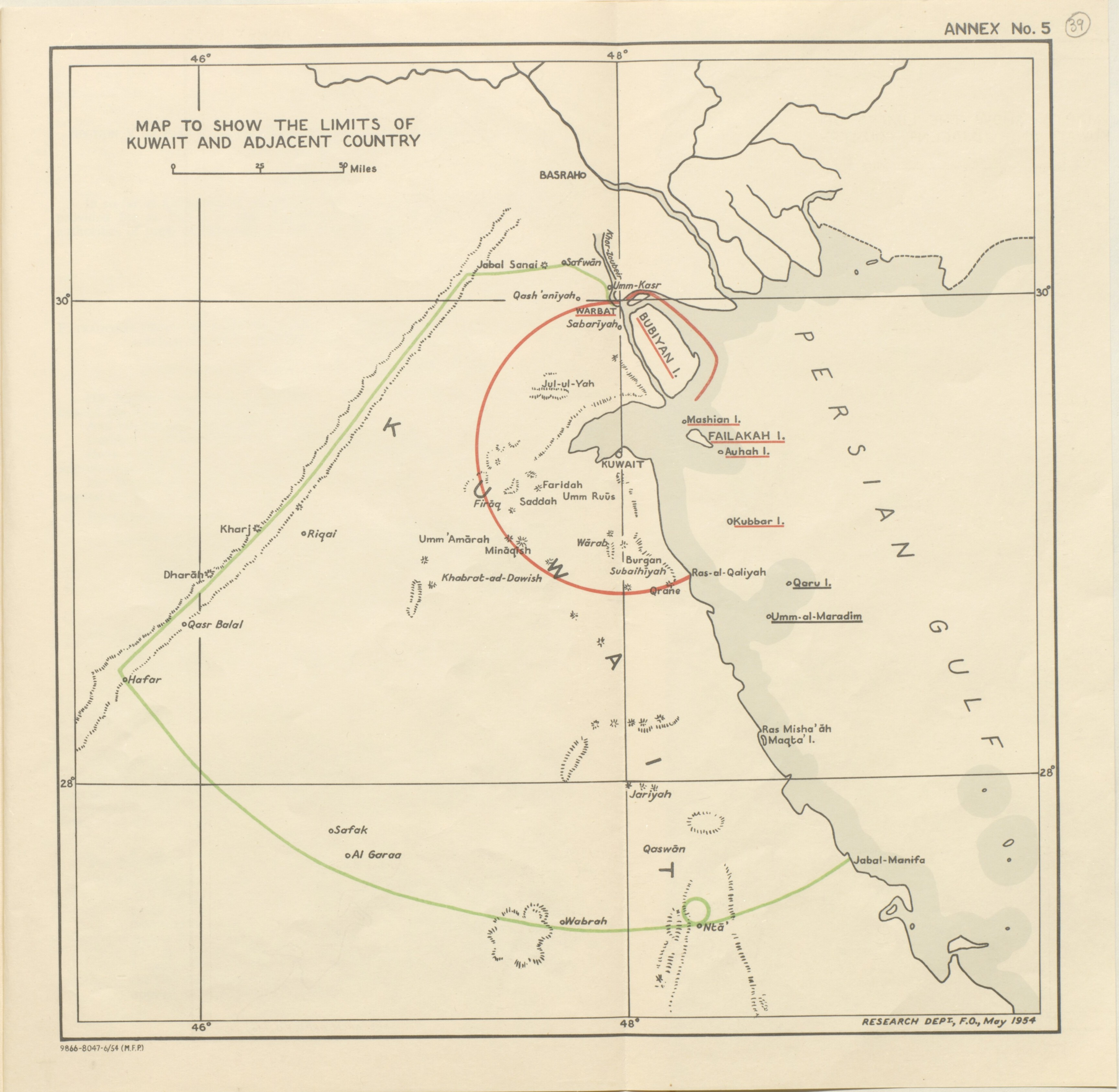
- Map with red circle and green circle boundaries according to the Anglo-Ottoman Convention of 1913
- Signed: 29 July 1913
- Parties: Ottoman Empire; United Kingdom
- Depositary: British government
- Language: English

The Anglo-Ottoman Convention of 1913, also known as the Blue Line, was an agreement between the Sublime Porte of the Ottoman Empire and the Government of the United Kingdom which defined the limits of Ottoman jurisdiction in the area of the Persian Gulf with respect to Kuwait, Qatar, Bahrain, and the Shatt al-Arab. It was signed on 29 July 1913, but never ratified. The long-lasting impact of the agreement was that of the status of Kuwait; the basis for both formal independence and the frontiers of modern Kuwait were established.

== Background ==
Informal negotiations began on 29 July 1911 in a British memorandum sent to the Ottoman Government. By this time, it seemed likely that the terminus for the German funded and engineered Baghdad Railway would be situated in Kuwait. Kuwait had been under Ottoman administration since 1871 and in 1875 was included in the Basra Vilayet. Although the sheikhdom now fell under the Empire’s jurisdiction, no Ottoman official was stationed in Kuwait. Influence over Kuwait was crucial to British foreign policy in the Persian Gulf with regard to commerce and strategic interests concerning India.

To the British, further extension of the railway line meant further expansion of Ottoman influence, and the current administration—already emboldened by the “Young Turk” regime—desired to reestablish effective control over its empire south of Kuwait. Even worse was the possible encroachment of other European powers. In the proposed memorandum, the British therefore sought to regularize the 1901 Status Quo agreement, with the added refinement of a clear definition of Kuwait's boundaries to Britain's advantage.

Although at times deadlocked, negotiations communicated via memorandums continued on a quid pro quo basis in which the British had the advantage; if the Ottomans were to accept Kuwait's autonomous status and proposed boundaries, the British would have to accept Ottoman suzerainty, and in return, the northern islands of Warbah and Bubiyan must be allocated to Kuwait, and so forth. The waning influence of Istanbul in the Gulf forced it to make concessions without much to gain in return. The Ottoman Empire had faced a number of setbacks in the last few decades—a few of its provinces achieved independence, some were annexed by other countries, or many lost in conflict—and for internal political reasons it may have seemed important to maintain Kuwait as part of the empire, even if only symbolically. The Ottomans also felt that making this agreement would ensure British support on other more pressing issues, such as dealing with invasion by other European powers and conflicts in other parts of the Ottoman Empire. Furthermore, British pressures led the Ottomans to abandon the proposed extension of the railway line to Kuwait and instead opt for a Basra terminus. Plans for a Basra terminus created a new series of demands on behalf of the British, including the Ottoman renunciation of Qatar, and delineating its role in the wider Persian Gulf waters. Britain had wanted to conclude agreements with Sheikh of Qatar Jasim al-Thani about illicit arms traffic and maritime peace, and also sought to formally establish its dominance in the Gulf. By 6 May 1913 Britain and the Ottoman Empire initialed the compromise and the Anglo-Ottoman Convention was signed on 29 July 1913, exactly two years after the first memorandum.

=== Non-ratification ===
The Anglo-Ottoman Convention was only part of a wider bargaining process and the complexities of the competing European commercial interests in the region prevented its ratification. Russia, France, and Germany (and later Italy) also had been pressing the Ottoman government for railway concessions. Ratification was further complicated by the fact that most of the Powers themselves were engaged in bilateral negotiations with the Ottoman Empire, just as the British had done with this Convention. Also, attempts to obtain oil concessions from the Ottoman government added to the complexity of commercial arrangements. Finally, the Ottomans and British emerged as enemies within months of the Anglo-Ottoman Convention of 1913, as the outbreak of World War I diminished any hope left for ratification.

Prior to the outbreak of hostilities a companion agreement covering the rest of the Arabian Peninsula, the Violet Line, was also negotiated.

== Terms ==
=== I. Kuwait ===
Section I of the convention comprised ten articles concerning the status of Kuwait, and its territorial boundaries. It included contradictory provisions in that the British acknowledged Kuwait as an autonomous provincial sub-district (kaza) of the Ottoman Empire within the drawn green-zone and pledged to not establish a protectorate, while the Ottoman Empire recognized the validity of agreements that had made Kuwait a British protectorate except by name and recognized Kuwait as an independent entity within the drawn red-zone.

According to the agreement, Kuwait constituted “an autonomous kaza of the Ottoman Empire,” thereby recognizing Sheikh Mubarak al-Sabah as ruler of Kuwait as well as kaymakam (Ottoman district governor) (Article 1). Kuwait was listed as such because the Ottomans and British interpretations of “sovereignty” and “suzerainty” differed in their counter-drafts and so both terms were omitted in the final draft.

As it was an “autonomous” kaza, the Ottoman government agreed to refrain from interfering in the affairs of Kuwait, “including the question of succession, and from any administrative as well as any occupation or military act.” It also allowed for the use of the Ottoman flag with the option to inscribe the word “Kuwait” on it (Article 2).

The agreement also identified the territories of Kuwait as two different regions, demarcated in red and green on a map annexed to the convention. The red line, as it is commonly referred to, demarcated the region in which the sheikh was to have “complete administrative autonomy.” This region was formed by “a semicircle with the town of Kuwayt in the center, the Khawr al-Zubayr at the northern extremity and al-Qurrayin at the southern extremity” (Article 5). This also included the surrounding islands of Warba and Bubiyan, which were major bargaining points for the British who viewed the Ottoman military posts on the islands as a threat.

The green line defined the region in which the Sheikh of Kuwait would exercise the administrative rights of an Ottoman kaymakam. The tribes situated in that area were “recognized within the dependence of the Shaykh of Kuwait,” and as kaymakam he was required to collect tribute (Article 6). The importance of the green line is that it set out for the first time the basis for the established frontiers of modern Kuwait:

The demarcation line begins on the coast at the mouth of Khor al-Zubair in the northwest and crosses immediately south of Umm-Qasr, Safwan, and Jabla Sanam, in such a way as to leave to the vilayet of Basrah these locations and their wells; arriving at the al-Batin, it follows it toward the southwest until Hafr-al-Batin which it leaves on the same side as Kuwayt; from that point on the line in question goes southeast leaving to the wells of al-Safah, al-Garaa, al-Haba, al-Warbah, and Antaa, reaching the sea near Jabal Munifa (Article 7).

Another major provision, and one which the Ottomans required, was that of the British declaration that no protectorate would be established over Kuwait (Article 4). Yet, the Ottoman government recognized the validity of the Anglo-Kuwaiti Agreement of 1899, and the 1900 and 1904 agreements in which Kuwait had undertaken not to engage in arms trade or allow another power to establish a post office, as well as land concessions made by the Sheikh to the British government (Article 3).

Smaller provisions were also added at the convention, which included the Sheikh's right to his private property in the vilayet of Basra (Article 9) and extradition (Article 10).

=== II. Qatar & III. Bahrain ===
Section II and III constitute provisions for Qatar and Bahrain, respectively. Central to the negotiations was the status of Qatar and Bahrain, and the British pressured the Ottoman government that it should renounce its claims to both. If the Ottoman government retained sovereignty over Qatar and Bahrain that would enable it the right to still intervene in matters of the Gulf, of which the British desired to retain a monopoly.

The Ottomans were willing to drop all claims to Bahrain, in which they had never been able to maintain anything but a symbolic role, but not Qatar. As a question of sovereignty, the Ottomans argued that the empire had always exercised effective sovereignty over the peninsula and could not justify the abandonment of territory which it had never formally renounced. Yet under considerable pressure it renounced claims to both (Articles 11 & 13) and a blue line was established to define the territorial limits of Ottoman jurisdiction. This line separated the Ottoman sanjak of Najd from Qatar. The blue line began a few miles to the south of Zaknuniya (which was included in the sanjak), directly south up to the Rub' al-Khali (Article 11). The agreement did not mention that Zaknuniya would be part of the Najd sanjak in return for an Ottoman consideration of £1,000 paid to the Sheikh of Bahrain via the British government.

With regard to Bahrain, the Ottomans renounced all claims to it so long as the British declared no intention of annexing it (Article 13) and did not claim capitulation rights for subjects of the Sheikh of Bahrain (protected by the Britannic Majesty's Consuls) living in the Ottoman Empire (Article 15).

=== IV. The Persian Gulf ===
The final step in ensuring its dominance over the Persian Gulf was formalizing British policing of the Gulf. Therefore, “for the Protection of its special interests…in the free water of the Persian Gulf and on the borders belonging to the independent Shaykhs from the south of al-Qatar up to the Indian Ocean,” the British were able to continue exercising, as in the past, the following measures (Article 16):

(a) Soundings, lighting of lighthouses, placement of buoys, piloting
(b) Maritime police
(c) Quarantine measures

== Sources ==
- Anscombe, Frederick F. The Ottoman Gulf: the creation of Kuwait, Saudi Arabia, and Qatar New York: Columbia University Press, 1997.
- Kelly, J. B. Eastern Arabian Frontiers New York: Frederick A Praeger, 1964.
- Kelly, J. B. Sovereignty and Jurisdiction in Eastern Arabia International Affairs (Royal Institute of International Affairs) 34.4 (1958): 16–24.
- Hurewitz, J. C., ed. The Middle East and North Africa in World Politics: A Documentary Record, 2nd edn. Vol. 1: European Expansion, 1535–1914. New Haven: Yale University Press, 1975, pp. 567–570.
- Schofield, Richard. Kuwait and Iraq: Historical and Territorial Disputes. London: Chatham House, 1991.
- Slot, B. J. Mubarak al-Sabah: Founder of Modern Kuwait 1896-1915. Arabian Publishing Ltd, 2005.
