= Basra vilayet =

First-level administrative division of the Ottoman Empire

Vilayet of Basra Arabic: ولاية البصرة Ottoman Turkish: ولايت بصره Vilâyet-i Basra
- 1875–1880; 1884–1918
- Flag Coat of arms

- The Basra Vilayet in 1900
- Capital: Basra
- Governor
  - 1875-1877: Nasir Pasha
  - 1916-1918: Khalil Pasha
- History
  - Established: 1884
  - Armistice of Mudros: 1918

Area
- 1900: 42,690 km^{2} (16,480 sq mi)

Population
  - 1900: 500,000
| Preceded by | Succeeded by |
| Baghdad Vilayet | Mandatory Iraq |
- Today part of: Iraq; Kuwait; Qatar; Saudi Arabia

The Basra Vilayet (Arabic: ولاية البصرة, Ottoman Turkish: ولايت بصره, romanized: Vilâyet-i Basra) was a first-level administrative division (vilayet) of the Ottoman Empire. It historically covered an area stretching from Nasiriyah and Amarah in the north to Kuwait in the south. To the south and the west, there was theoretically no border at all, yet no areas beyond Qatar in the south and the Najd Sanjak in the west were later on included in the administrative system.

At the beginning of the 20th century, it reportedly had an area of 16,482 square miles (42,690 km^{2}), while the preliminary results of the first Ottoman census of 1885 (published in 1908) gave the population as 200,000. The accuracy of the population figures ranges from "approximate" to "merely conjectural" depending on the region from which they were gathered.

The capital of the vilayet, Basra, was an important military centre, with a permanent garrison of 400 to 500 men, and was home to the Ottoman Navy in the Persian Gulf.

== History ==
It was a vilayet from 1875 to 1880, and again after 1884, when it was recreated from the southern sanjaks of the Baghdad Vilayet.

After 1884, the vilayet was briefly expanded down the littoral of the Gulf to incorporate Najd and al-Hasa, including Hofuf, Qatar, and Qatif, the incorporation of Najd only lasted until 1913 before the end of the Basra Vilayet.

In 1899, Shaikh Mubarak concluded a treaty with Britain, stipulating that Britain would protect Kuwait against any external aggression, de facto turning it into a British protectorate. Despite the Kuwaiti government's desire to either be independent or under British rule, the British concurred with the Ottoman Empire in defining Kuwait as an autonomous caza of the Ottoman Empire. This would last until World War I.

Basra fell to the British on 22 November 1914, and the Mesopotamian Expeditionary Force had occupied almost the whole of the vilayet by July 1915.

== Administrative divisions ==
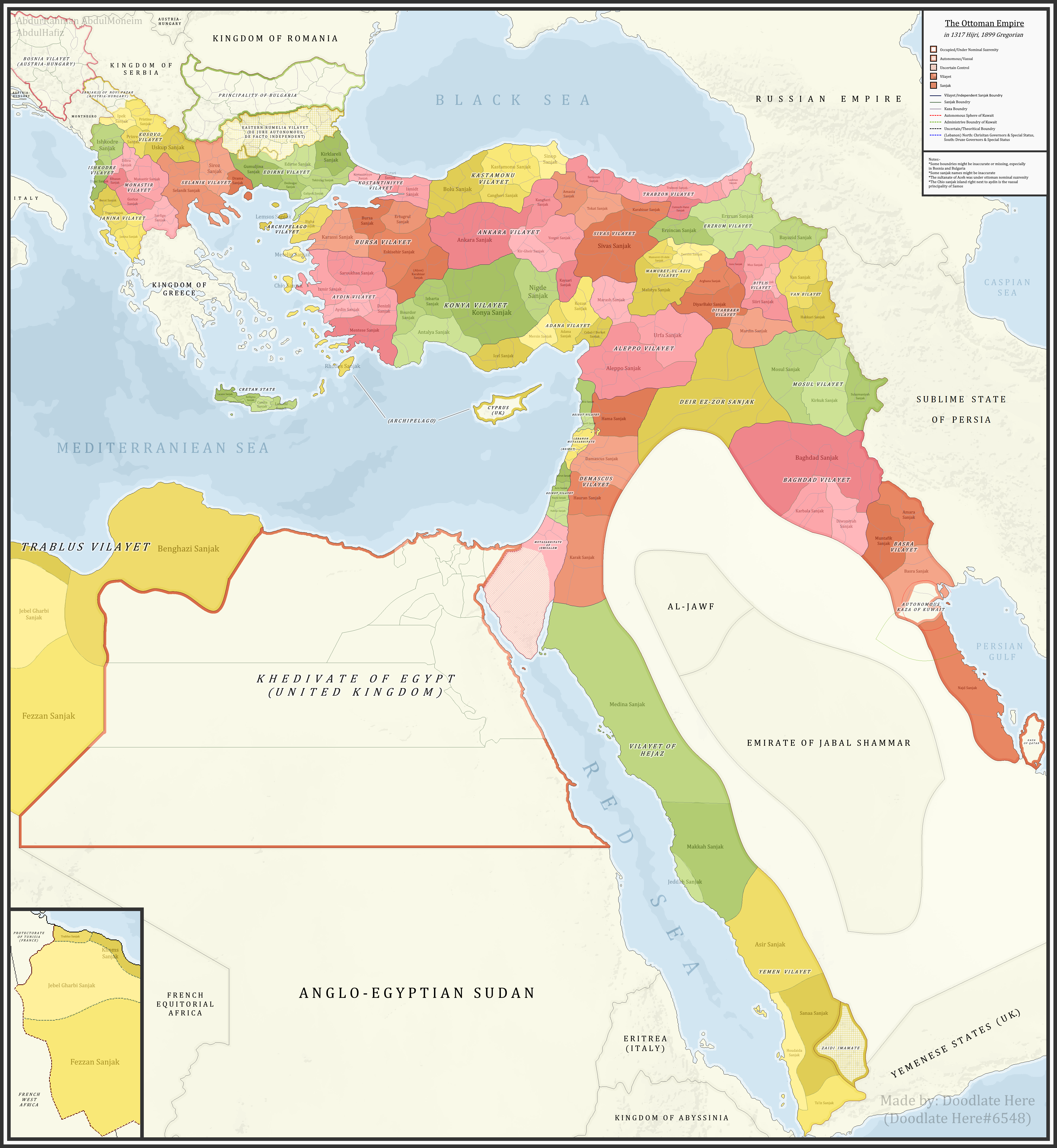
A map showing the administrative divisions of the Ottoman Empire in 1317 Hijri, 1899 Gregorian, Including the Vilayet of Basra and its sanjaks

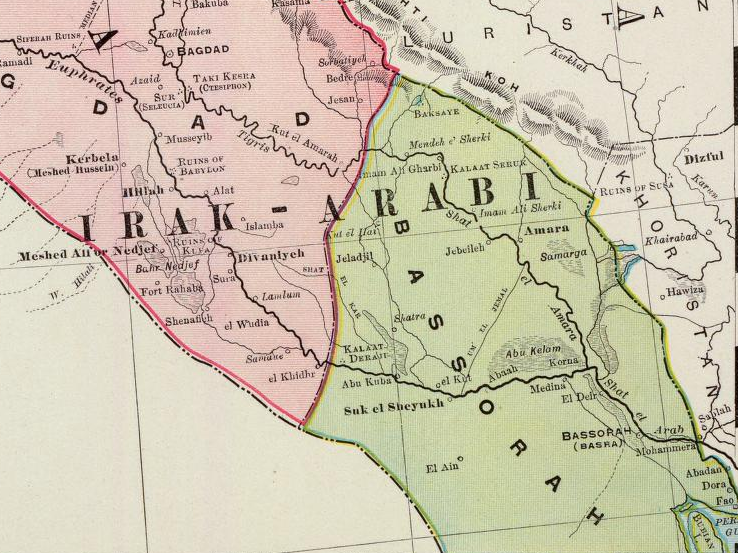
Map of Basra Province in 1897

Sanjaks of the vilayet:

1. Amara Sanjak
2. Basra Sanjak
3. Diwanniyya Sanjak
4. Muntafiq Sanjak
5. Najd Sanjak; from 1875, conquered by the Saudis in 1913.
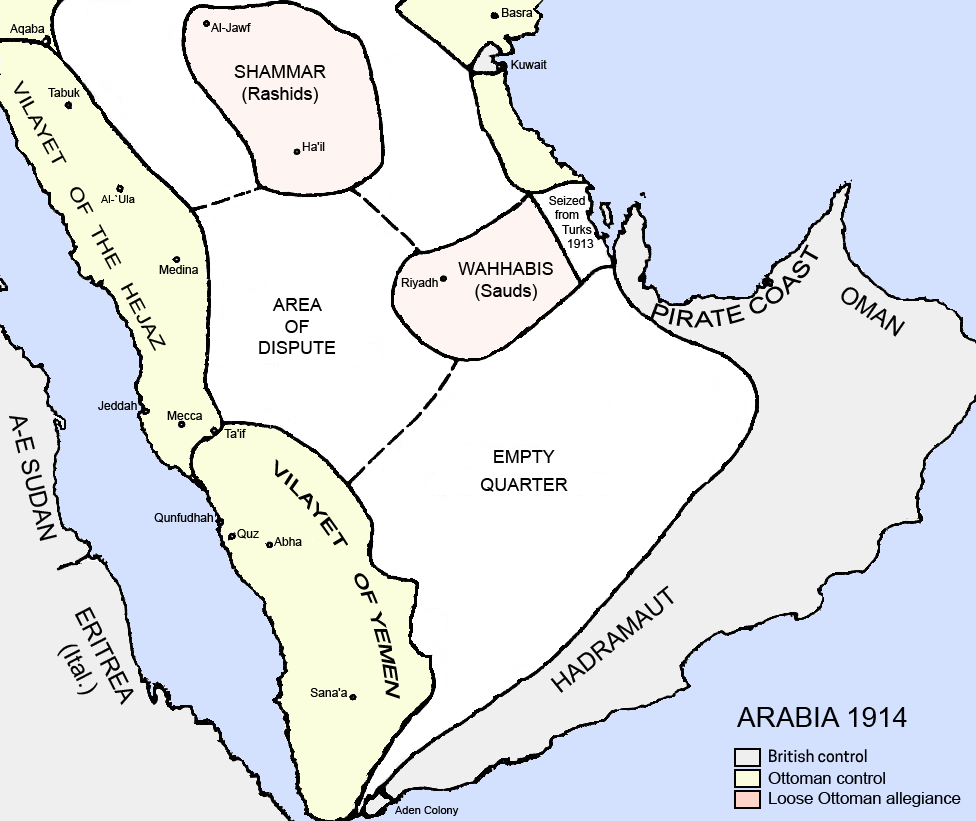
  Arabia before World War I 1914

== Governors ==
Governors of the Basra Vilayet:

- Nasir Pasha (1875–1877)
- Vekili Ferik Mehmed Münir Pasha (1877–1879)
- Ferik Sabit Pasha (1879–1880)
- Mazhar Pasha (1880–1882)
- Yahya Pasha (1882–1884)
- Ali Riza Pasha (1884–1886)
- Izzet Pasha (1886–1888)
- Ferik Shaban Pasha (1888)
- Hidayat Pasha (1888–1891)
- Mehmed Hafiz Pasha (1891–1892)
- Bahriye Komutani Emin Pasha (1892)
- Ferik Mahmut Hamdi Pasha (1892–1893)
- Mehmed Hafiz Pasha (1893)
- Hamdi Pasha (1st time) (1893–1896)
- Arif Pasha (December 1896 – February 1898)
- Mehmed Enis Pasha (March 1898 – April 1899)
- Hamdi Pasha (2nd time) (April 1899 – January 1900)
- Mehmed Muhsin Pasha (January 1900 – September 1902)
- Mustafa Nuri Pasha (September 1902 – September 1906)
- Abdurrahman Hasan Bey (September 1906 – August 1908)
- Muharram Efendi (August 1908 – February 1908)
- Marchdine Mehmed Arif Bey (February 1909 – September 1909)
- Süleyman Nazif Bey (September 1909 – November 1910)
- Kavurzade Huseyin Celal Bey (December 1910 – July 1911)
- Bagdali Hasan Riza Pasha (July 1911 – December 1912)
- Malik Efendi (December 1912 – February 1913)
- Ali Riza Pasha (Feb 1913 – March 1913)
- Alaeddin Bey Altaz (March 1913 – July 1913)
- Izzet Pasha (July 1913 – December 1913)
- Süleyman Şefik Pasha (December 1913 – July 1914)
- Subhi Bey (July 1914 – November 1914)
- Süleyman Askerî Pasha (November 1914 – 1916)
- Halil Pasha (1916 – 11 March 1917)

== See also ==
- Anglo-Ottoman Convention of 1913
