= Jasim bin Jabir =

Persian Gulf pirate

Jasim bin Jabir (Arabic: جاسم بن جابر), also known as Raqraqi, was a 19th-century pirate active in the Persian Gulf.

Bin Jabir had his base at Khor Al Adaid and attacked British ships in the Persian Gulf, with caravans carrying the booty inland. Khalifa bin Shakhbout, the ruler of Abu Dhabi, having received permission from the resident British authorities, attacked Khor Al Adaid in May 1836, killing 50 men and destroying its houses and fort. In the aftermath of the attack, bin Jabir took refuge in Doha in September 1836. The chief of Doha was warned not to harbor bin Jabir, but he refused to heed the warning. In the aftermath of bin Jabir's seizure of a British vessel off of Ras al-Khaimah in February 1841, the city of Doha was bombarded by British forces as punishment for continuing to provide him with a safehaven.

== See also ==
Piracy in the Persian Gulf
