= Najd Sanjak =

Sanjak of the Ottoman Empire (1871–1915)

Najd Sanjak Necid Sancağı (Turkish) لواء نجد (Arabic)
- Sanjak of the Ottoman Empire
- 1871–1915
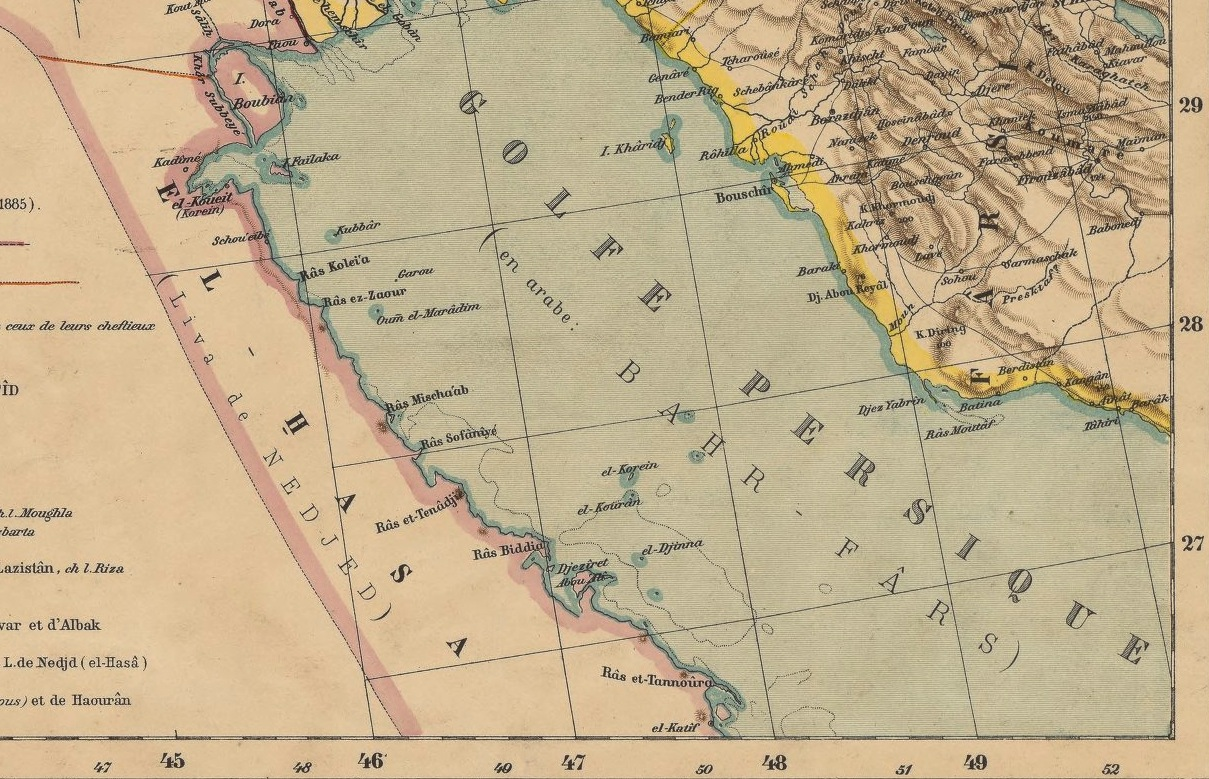
- 1886 map showing part of the sanjak of Nejd (Liva de Nedjed)
- Capital: Hofuf
- Demonym: Najdi
- Population
  - 1896: 82,900
- History
  - Established: 1871
  - Disestablished: 1915
Preceded by	Succeeded by
Second Saudi state	Emirate of Nejd and Hasa; Emirate of Kuwait
- Today part of: Saudi Arabia; Qatar; Kuwait

The Sanjak of Najd (Arabic: لواء نجد) was a sanjak (second-level province) of the Ottoman Empire. The name is considered misleading, as it covered the al-Hasa region, rather than the much larger Najd region. It was part of the Baghdad vilayet from June 1871 to 1875, when it became part of the Basra Vilayet.

The mutasarrif was located in Hofuf, which was garrisoned by up to 600 men, the largest Ottoman force in the area.

== History ==
The opening of the Suez Canal in 1869 gave a new strategic importance to this region, stoking Ottoman interests in establishing effective control as a result of the revival of trade. In 1871, Midhat Pasha invaded al-Hasa and restored Ottoman control. When he incorporated this desert region into the Ottoman realm, Midhat Pasha had granted the local notables complete exemptions from taxation, except for the zakat.

In 1872, Qatar was designated a kaza under the Sanjak of the Najd. In March 1893, at the Battle of Al Wajbah (16 km (9.9 mi) west of Doha), Shaikh Jassim bin Mohammed Al Thani defeated the Ottomans. Although Qatar did not gain full independence, the result of the battle forced a treaty that would later form the basis of Qatar emerging as an autonomous separate country within the empire.

The Sultan recognized Abdullah II Al-Sabah as the kaymakam of Kuwait as a subprovince of al-Ahsa, formally acknowledging that Kuwait was a part of the Ottoman Empire and that it was ruled by the Sabah family.

In 1899, Shaikh Mubarak concluded a treaty with Britain, stipulating that Britain would protect Kuwait against any external aggression, de facto turning it into a British protectorate. Despite the Kuwaiti government's desire to either be independent or under British rule, the British concurred with the Ottoman Empire in defining Kuwait as an autonomous caza of the Ottoman Empire. This would last until World War I.

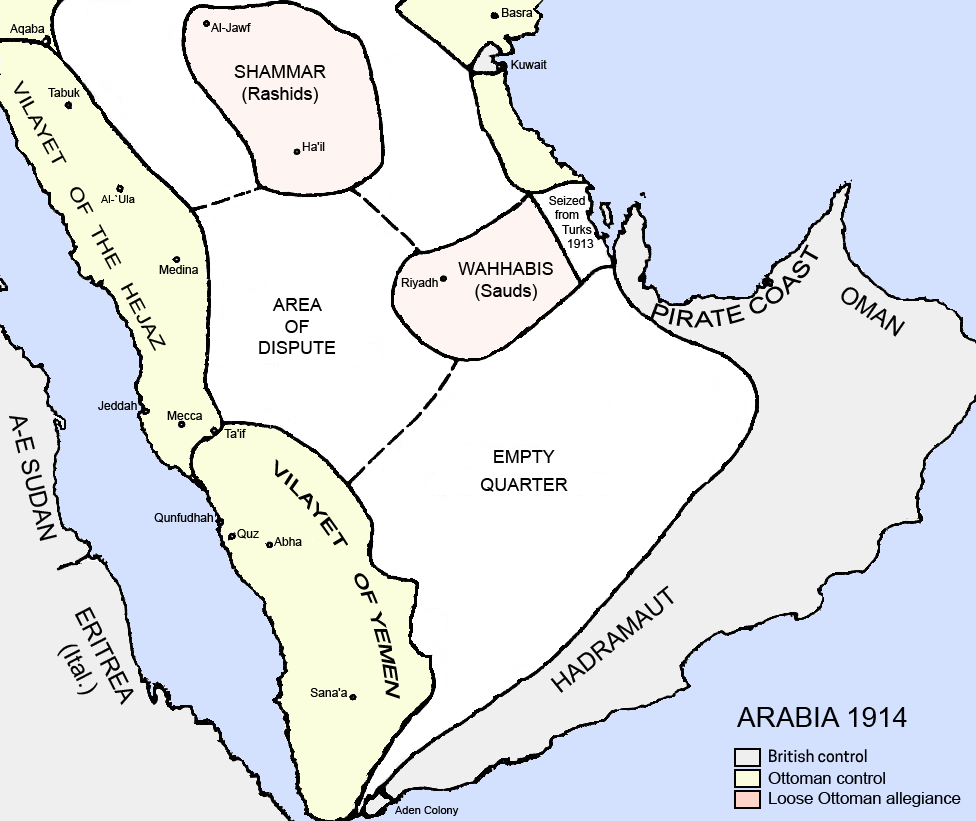
Arabia before World War I 1914

In 1913, Ibn Saud launched an attack on Hofuf, where 1,200 Turkish troops had been stationed since the province's annexation in 1871. The Ottoman garrison was expelled from Hasa, and the territory fell to the Al Saud. Even after the conquest of Hasa, Britain considered Ibn Saud to be an Ottoman vassal, and the Anglo-Ottoman Convention of 1913 defined the boundaries of the sanjak of Najd, neither objecting to nor recognising Ibn Saud's conquest.

In 1914, Ibn Saud signed a treaty with the Ottomans where he was awarded the title of pasha, and named wali of the newly created Vilayet Najd. In return, he pledged loyalty to the Ottomans, to pay an annual tribute to them, to allow a symbolic Ottoman military presence in his vilayet, to fly the Ottoman flag on all government buildings, and to avoid all contact with foreign powers. The treaty was signed by Pasha Ibn Saud, Wali of Najd Wilayet, and Commander of its Army, and Suleiman Shafik Bin Ali Kamali, Wali of Basrah Wilayet, and Commander of its Forces. In July 1914, the Ottoman Sultan issued an Imperial "firman" decree, officially declaring Ibn Saud as the Wali of Najd.

This situation was dramatically changed by the outbreak of World War I, and on 26 December 1915 Britain recognised Najd, Hasa, Qatif and Jubail as Saudi possessions, as part of the Anglo-Saudi Treaty.

== Administrative divisions ==
Kazas of the sanjak in 1896:

- Hofuf
- Qatif
- Qatar

== Governors ==
- Sayyid Talib al-Naqib (1902–1904)
