= Battle of Al Wajbah =

Armed conflict in Qatar

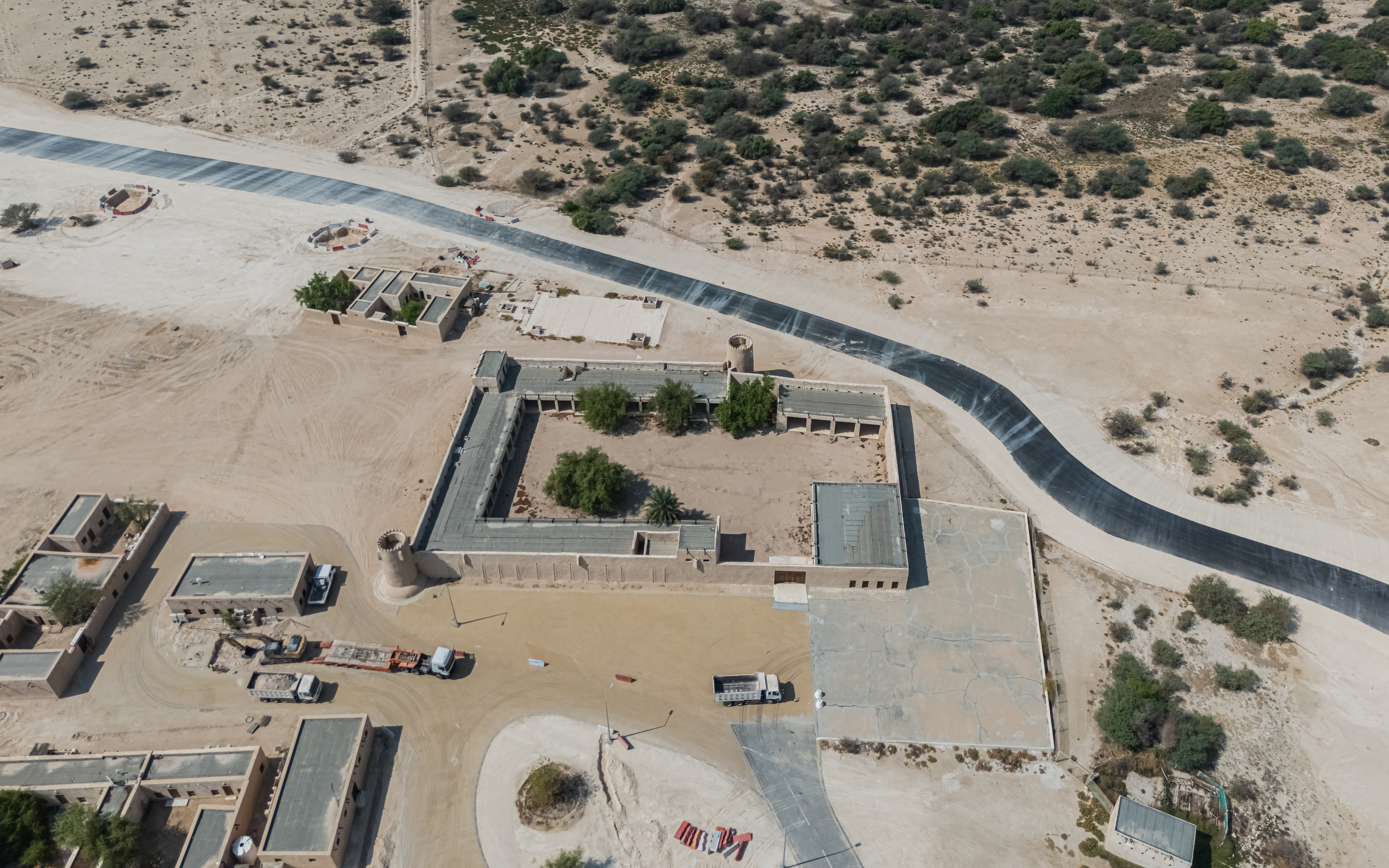
- Aerial view of Al Wajbah Fort, 2024
Date	March 1893
Location	Al Wajbah Fort
Result	Qatari victory: Relinquishment of Qatari captives; Deposal of Mehmed Hafiz Pasha as governor of Basra; Qatar granted self-governance by the Ottoman Empire

Belligerents
Qatar	Ottoman Empire

Commanders and leaders
Jassim bin Mohammed Al Thani	Mehmed Hafiz Pasha; Yusuf Effendi

Strength
Between 3,000 and 4,000	Between 200 and 300

Casualties and losses
400 killed (including civilians)	Between 11 and 117 killed

The Battle of Al Wajbah took place in March 1893 in Qatar, a province of the Ottoman Empire's Najd sanjak at that time. The conflict was initiated after Ottoman officials imprisoned 16 Qatari tribal leaders and ordered a column of troops to march toward the Al Thani stronghold in the village of Al Wajbah in response to kaymakam Jassim Al Thani's refusal to submit to Ottoman authority.

The main battle took place in Al Wajbah Fort. After the Ottomans' unsuccessful attempt at seizing the fort, they retreated to their fort in Al Bidda. Shortly after, Al Thani's troop besieged the fortress and cut off the water supply of the neighborhood, resulting in the concession of defeat by the Ottomans. An agreement followed to relinquish the Qatari captives in return for the safe passage of Mehmed Pasha's cavalry to Hofuf by land.

Although Qatar did not gain full independence from the Ottoman Empire, the result of the battle is seen by Qatar as a defining moment in the establishment of Qatar as a modern state.

== Background ==
In 1871, Jassim bin Mohammed Al Thani, who had recently assumed power from his father, authorized the Ottomans to send 100 troops and equipment to Al Bidda. By January 1872, the Ottomans had incorporated Qatar into their dominion. It was designated a province in Najd under the control of the sanjak of Najd. Al Thani was appointed as the kaymakam (sub-governor) of the district, and most other Qataris were allowed to keep their positions in the new government.

Despite the disapproval of local tribes, Al Thani continued supporting Ottoman rule. However, Qatari–Ottoman relations soon stagnated, and in 1882 they suffered further setbacks when the Ottomans refused to render significant aid to Al Thani in his expedition of Abu Dhabi-occupied Khor Al Adaid during the Qatari–Abu Dhabi War. Al Thani fell out of favour with the Ottomans after they received complaints from Qataris regarding his oppressions from 1885 to 1886. In a further blow to bilateral relations, the Ottomans supported the Ottoman subject Muhammad bin Abdul Wahhab Al Faihani who attempted to supplant Al Thani as kaymakam of Qatar in 1888.

In 1890, the Ottomans attempted to further consolidate their influence over Qatar by imposing numerous administrative reforms, increasing taxes and stationing additional troops in their garrison at Al Bidda. This eventually led Al Thani to rebel against the Ottomans, who he believed were seeking to usurp control of the peninsula. He resigned as kaymakam and stopped paying taxes in August 1892.

== Chronology ==
=== Negotiations ===
In October 1892, an Ottoman army comprising approximately 200 men led by the governor of Basra, Mehmed Hafiz Pasha, was sent to Qatar in response to Al Thani's transgressions. They arrived in February 1893, with further reinforcements en route from Kuwait. Al Thani, fearing that he would face death or imprisonment, fled first to Al Daayen, and then to Al Wajbah Fort (16 km (10 mi) west of Doha) where he was accompanied by several Qatari tribes.

Mehmed sent a letter to Al Thani demanding that he disband his troops and pledge loyalty to the Ottomans. Al Thani remained adamant in his refusal to comply with Ottoman authority and refused to meet with Mehmed himself on the basis of ill health. Instead, he appointed his brother, Ahmed bin Mohammed Al Thani, as his emissary. In March, after a month of back-and-forth parleying, Mehmed lost patience and imprisoned Al Thani's brother and between 13 and 16 prominent Qatari tribal leaders on the Ottoman corvette Merrikh. He also blockaded the village of Al Wajbah.

Al Thani offered to pay a fee of ten thousand liras in return for the captives' release, but Mehmed declined his offer.

=== Battle ===
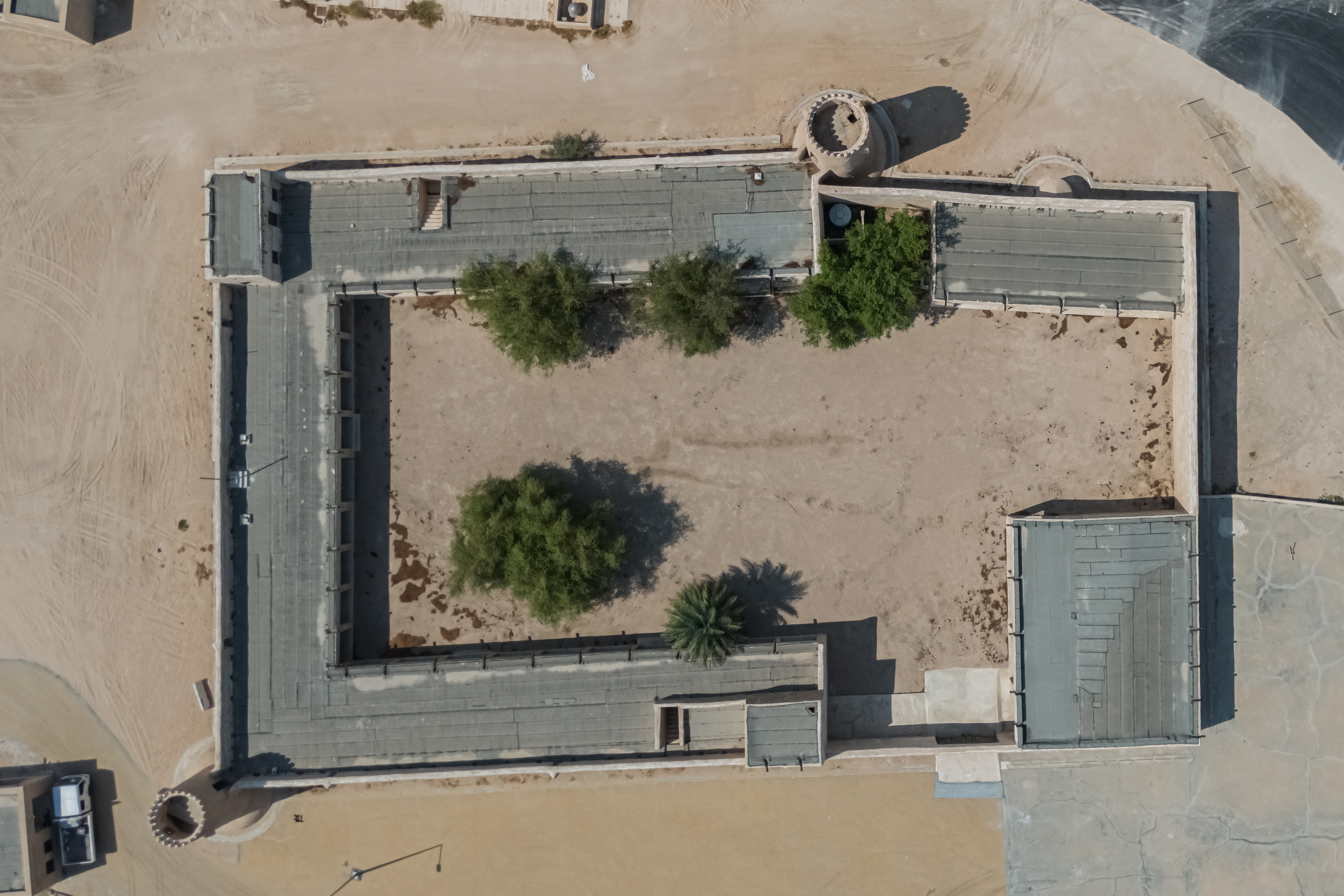
Overhead view of Al Wajbah Fort in 2024

After declining Sheikh Jassim Al Thani's offer, Mehmed ordered a column of troops to advance towards Al Wajbah Fort under the command of general Yusuf Effendi. Shortly after Effendi's troops arrived at Al Wajbah, they came under heavy gunfire from Qatari infantry and cavalry troops, which totalled 3,000 to 4,000 men. After seven hours of exchanging gunfire, the Ottomans retreated to Al Shaqab fortress, where they sustained further casualties from a Qatari incursion. The Ottomans also lost contact with their incoming reinforcements from Kuwait, as their messages had been intercepted by Qatari Bedouins.

The Ottoman troops retreated for a third time, to their fortress in Al Bidda, where their corvette was stationed. They proceeded to fire indiscriminately at the townspeople, killing a number of civilians. Shortly after, Al Thani's advancing column besieged the fortress and cut off the water supply of the neighbourhood. Without water and lacking in supplies, the Ottomans conceded defeat and agreed to relinquish the Qatari captives in return for the safe passage of Mehmed's cavalry to Hofuf by land.

A report by the British government published one year after the battle states the following:

"The total Arab loss, including women and children, who, being driven out into the desert, perished from exposure, has been stated at 420, which is probably an outside estimate. On the Turkish side the loss has been set down at 40 to 100; and as both parties may be supposed, though from different motives, to be inclined to reduce the number, the higher figure is perhaps not very wide of the mark, excluding some of the wounded sent to Basra."

=== Aftermath ===
Out of fear of further rebellion, the Ottoman government granted Al Thani a full pardon. Furthermore, the Ottoman sultan, Abdul Hamid II, deposed Mehmet Hafiz Pasha as governor of Basra. Although Qatar did not gain full independence from the Ottoman Empire until 1915, the result of the battle further consolidated Al Thani-rule over the country. It is also seen by Qataris as a defining moment in the establishment of Qatar as a modern state.

== Bibliography ==
- Althani, Mohamed (2013). Jassim the Leader: Founder of Qatar. Profile Books. ISBN 978-1781250709.
- Anscombe, Frederick F. (1997). The Ottoman Gulf: The Creation of Kuwait, Saudi Arabia, and Qatar. Columbia University Press. ISBN 978-0231108393.
- Casey, Paula; Vine, Peter (1991). The heritage of Qatar (print ed.). Immel Publishing. ISBN 978-0907151500.
- Fromherz, Allen (13 April 2012). Qatar: A Modern History. Georgetown University Press. ISBN 978-1-58901-910-2.
- Rahman, Habibur (2006). The Emergence Of Qatar. Routledge. ISBN 978-0710312136.
- Zahlan, Rosemarie Said (1979). The creation of Qatar (print ed.). Barnes & Noble Books. ISBN 978-0064979658.
