= Al Wajbah =

Al Wajbah الوجبة
- District
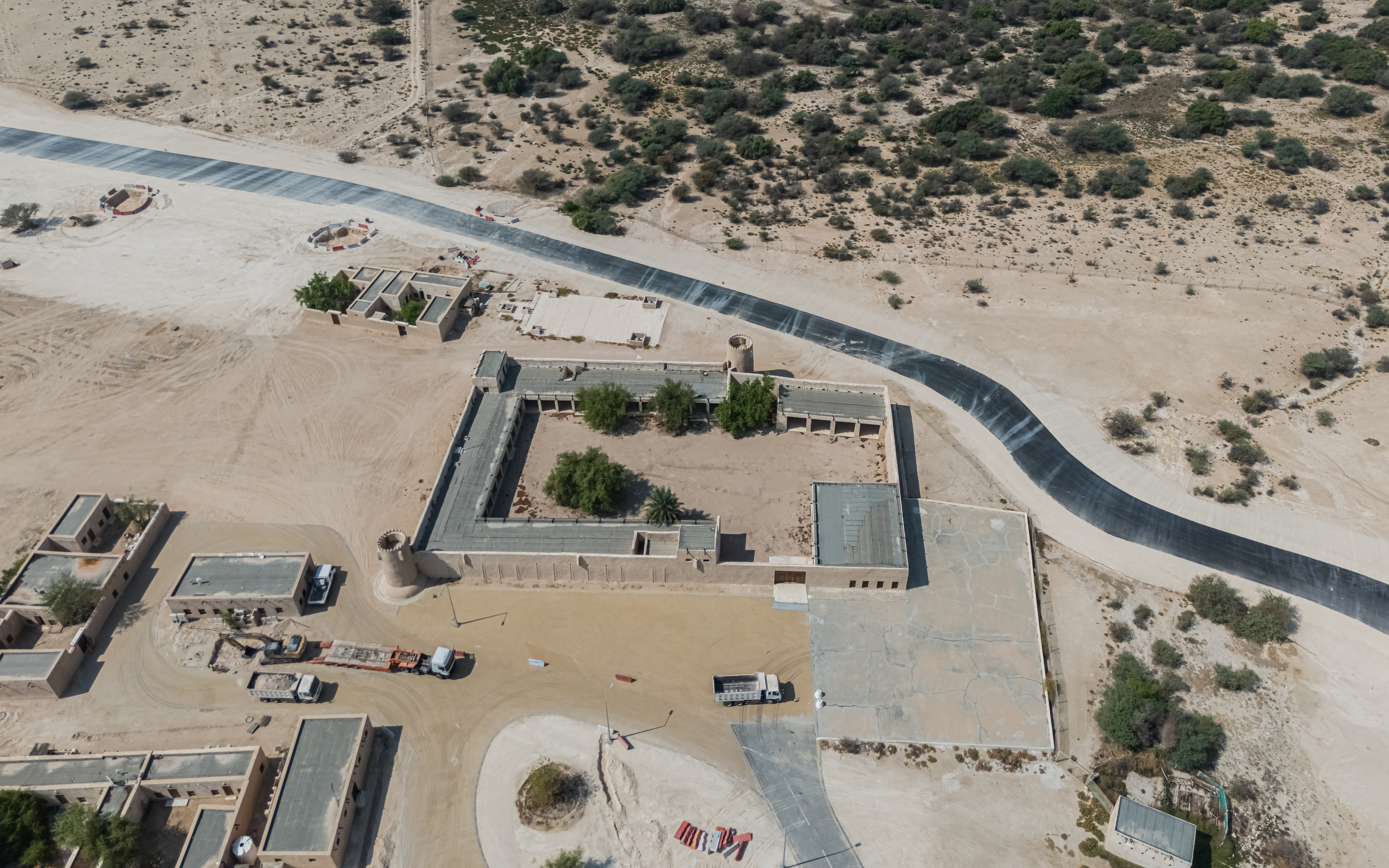
- Aerial view of Al Wajbah Fort

- Location within Qatar
- Country: Qatar
- Municipality: Al Rayyan
- Zone: Zone 53
- District no.: 66

Area
  - Total: 24.2 km^{2} (9.3 sq mi)
- Elevation: 35 m (115 ft)

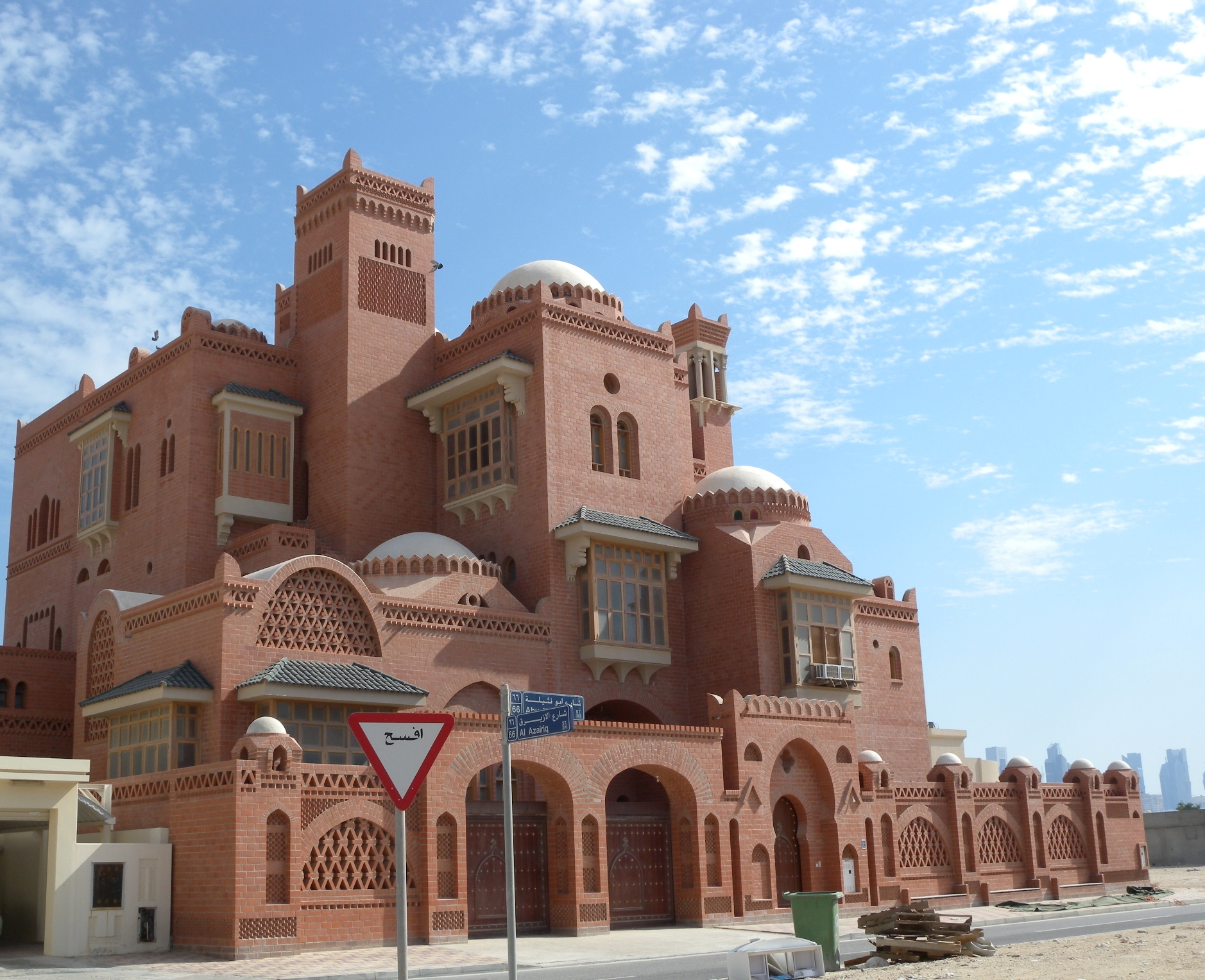
Al Azairiq Street in Al Wajbah

Al Wajbah (Arabic: الوجبة) is a district in Qatar in the municipality of Al Rayyan. It lies 10 miles (16 km) west of the capital Doha. The village was the site of the Battle of Al Wajbah, an armed conflict between the Ottomans and the Qatari tribes in 1893. It was blockaded by the Ottomans in March 1893. The main encounter took place later that month in the village's Al Wajbah Fort.

== Etymology ==
Wajbah is the local pronunciation of the Arabic word waqb, which means "hole". Since the area is built on a depression, the sunken surface resembles a large hole.

== History ==
In J. G. Lorimer's Gazetteer of the Persian Gulf, the town was stated to have accommodated a walled garden with a fort and a mosque in 1908, all of which were owned by a member of the ruling family. It was also described as a Bedouin encampment site which contained three 40 feet (12 m) deep masonry wells yielding good water. The area was historically a popular grazing spot for Bedouins due to its relative greenery compared to neighboring localities.

== Landmarks ==
=== Al Wajbah Fort ===
It is unknown exactly when Al Wajbah Fort was built, but it is thought to date back either to the late 18th century or the 19th century. It was the site of the Battle of Al Wajbah between Sheikh Jassim bin Mohammed Al Thani and the Ottoman Empire.

Rectangular in shape, the fortress measures 34 metres (112 ft) in length and 19 metres (62 ft) in width. The fort has four towers—two round and two rectangular. While the round towers feature serrated upper platforms and shooting openings, the rectangular ones lack such features. Drainage systems integrated into the fortress walls efficiently manage rainwater runoff.

Constructed primarily from hard limestone and clay, the fortress walls are plastered with gypsum. Inside, nineteen rooms on the lower level and upper chambers within the towers once served various purposes, including housing, worship, and assembly. Despite unauthorized modifications in the past, efforts in 1990 by the Department of Museums and Archaeology restored the fortress to its original state, removing alterations and reinforcing structural integrity.

== Healthcare ==
The Al Wajbah Medical Centre opened its doors in May 2018. Residents of Al Shagub, Umm Al Jawashin, Al Rayyan Al Jadeed, Muaither, Rawdat Al-Nasser, Maqroon, Muraikh, and Fereej Al Zaeem are eligible to register. Clinics found in the centre include a psychological support clinic, a dermatology clinic, a dental health clinic and a physical therapy clinic. The centre also contains ultrasound machines, a pharmacy and a laboratory. Aside from medical services, the centre has a gym, a swimming pool and a sauna.

== Education ==
Name of School	Curriculum	Grade	Genders	Official Website	Ref
Al Wajba Preparatory Girls School	Qatari	Secondary	Female-only	N/A	
Doha College - Al Wajbah	British	Kindergarten – Secondary	Both	Official website	
