= Qatari–Abu Dhabi War =

Armed conflict betwewen Qatar and the Emirate of Abu Dhabi

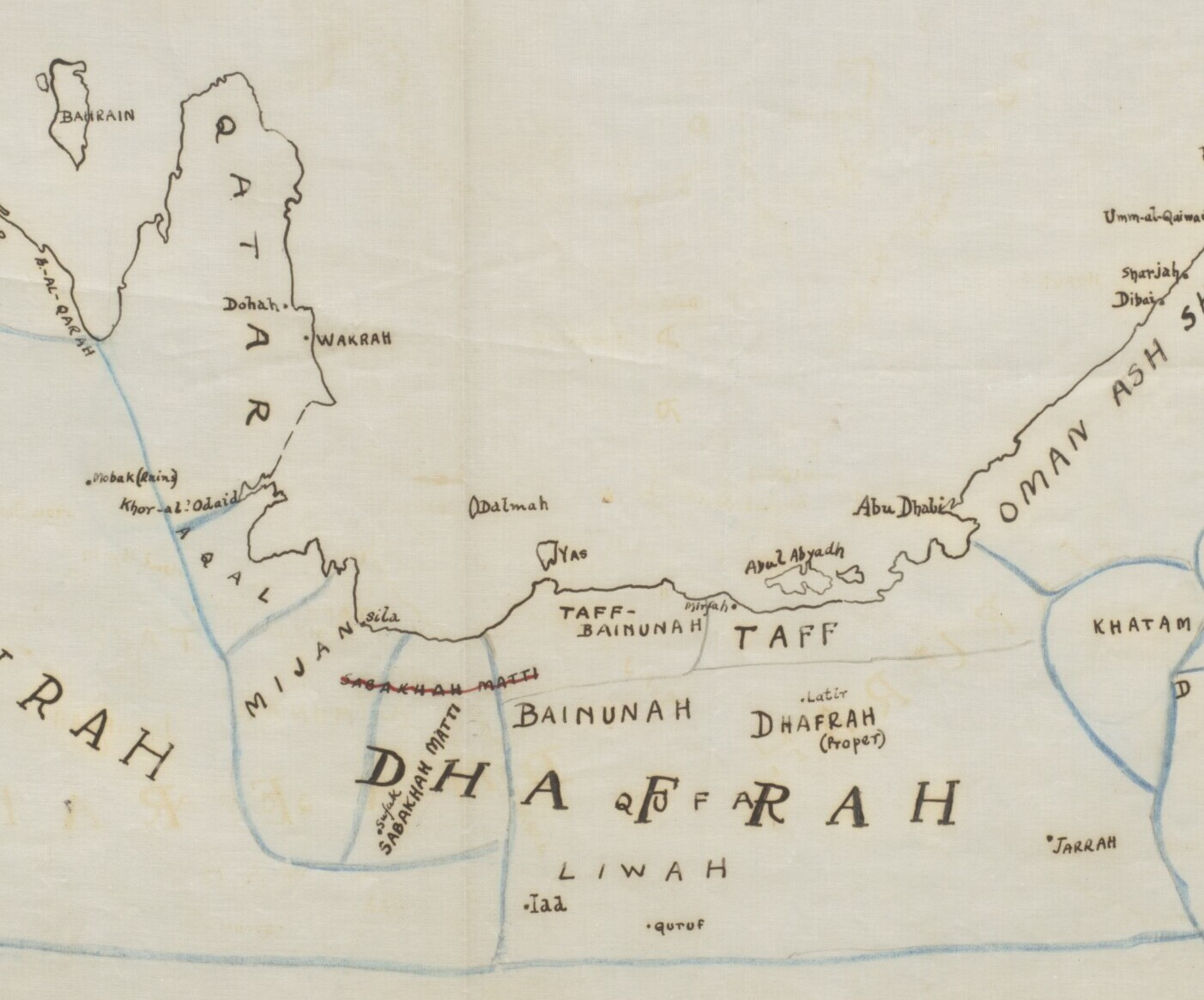
- Rudimentary sketch map depicting Qatar and Abu Dhabi produced by the British government in 1926
Date	1881–1893
Location	Eastern Arabia
Result	Inconclusive: No territorial changes; British-mediated peace agreement in 1893

Belligerents
Qatar; Supported by: Ottoman Empire	Abu Dhabi; Supported by: United Kingdom

Commanders and leaders
Jassim bin Mohammed Al Thani; Ahmed bin Muhammed Al Thani	Zayed bin Khalifa Al Nahyan; Khalifa bin Zayed bin Khalifa Al Nahyan

The Qatari–Abu Dhabi War was a series of territorial disputes and military conflicts between Qatar, led by Sheikh Jassim bin Mohammed Al Thani, and the Emirate of Abu Dhabi, under Sheikh Zayed bin Khalifa Al Nahyan. From 1881 to 1893, tensions were escalated through a series of raids and counter-raids between the two emirates. The first conflicts between the two occurred in 1881, during the battles of Baynunah, Suwaihan and Al-Marsaf.

The Battle of Khannour, which occurred on Abu Dhabi territory from January to February 1889, saw the climax of the war, with hundreds of reported casualties. The conflict ended in 1893 following British mediation.

== Background ==
In the late 19th century, the Persian Gulf was undergoing significant political and economic changes. This period was characterized by shifting power dynamics, emerging state structures, and the influence of imperial powers in the region. During this time, both Qatar and Abu Dhabi were in the process of consolidating their political structures. Qatar was under the leadership of Sheikh Jassim bin Mohammed Al Thani, who had been gradually asserting Qatar's independence since 1868. Sheikh Jassim officially took control of Qatar in 1878, following the death of his father. Meanwhile, Abu Dhabi was ruled by Sheikh Zayed bin Khalifa Al Nahyan, who had assumed power in 1855. Under his leadership, Abu Dhabi had become one of the most important emirates in the region.

Qatar had aligned itself more closely with the Ottoman Empire. In 1871, Qatar came under Ottoman protection, with Jassim accepting the position of Ottoman kaymakam (district governor). In contrast, Abu Dhabi, along with other Gulf emirates, had signed maritime peace treaties with Britain, which gave the British significant influence in the region.

Economic factors also played a role in shaping the conflict. The traditional pearl fishing economies of the Gulf were in decline during this period, leading to shifts in economic power and increased competition for resources. This economic pressure exacerbated existing tensions between the two emirates.

The conflict was further fueled by longstanding territorial disputes between Qatar and Abu Dhabi. The two emirates shared a border region that was poorly defined, leading to frequent disputes. Control over grazing lands, fishing grounds, and pearl banks was crucial for both emirates. These ill-defined borders and competing claims over resources were a constant source of friction between Qatar and Abu Dhabi.

== Causes ==
=== Qubaisat secession and territorial dispute ===
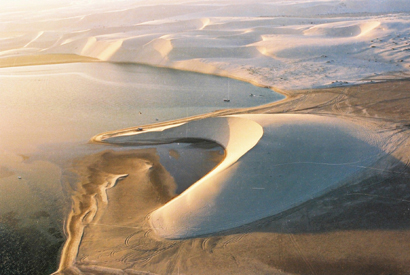
Khor Al Adaid, site of territorial dispute between Qatar and Abu Dhabi

In 1869, the Qubaisat, a subordinate branch of the Bani Yas tribe of Abu Dhabi, seceded under Sheikh Butay bin Khadim. They settled in Khor Al Adaid, an inlet on the southeast Qatari Peninsula disputed between Qatar and Abu Dhabi. This move occurred at the end of the pearl-fishing season, leaving many debts unsettled in Abu Dhabi. The Qubaisat's settlement at Khor Al Adaid was seen as a direct challenge to Zayed's authority, as they renounced their allegiance to their hereditary chief.

British authorities attempted to mediate between Zayed and the Qubaisat. However, these efforts were undermined by Qatar's leaders. Sheikh Mohammed bin Saeed Bukawarah protested against the mediation attempts and claimed that the Qubaisat owed him 70,000 krohns. Jassim, similarly, opposed mediation and claimed 4,000 krohns against the Qubaisat. He also obtained an Ottoman flag for the Al Adaid settlers, attempting to transfer their allegiance to the Ottoman Empire.

Khor Al Adaid quickly became a focal point of contention. Zayed wanted to attack Khor Al Adaid to reassert his authority, but was constrained by the maritime truce enforced by the British. He appealed to the British Political Resident in the Persian Gulf for permission to proceed by sea against Khor Al Adaid, arguing that the settlement was detrimental to Abu Dhabi's prosperity and provided refuge for debtors fleeing their creditors.

In 1878, the British Government of India granted Zayed permission to assert his authority over Khor Al Adaid. A British warship, HMS Teazer, was dispatched to oversee the operation. However, the Qubaisat fled to Al Bidda before Zayed's arrival, where they were welcomed by Qatar's sheikhs.

In May 1881, Sheikh Jassim wrote to the Political Resident requesting permission to occupy Khor Al Adaid, claiming it as part of Qatar. This claim was rejected by British authorities, who ruled that Khor Al Adaid was under Abu Dhabi's jurisdiction.

=== Alleged piracy ===
According to the British, the area around Khor Al Adaid had become a haven for piracy. Bedouin tribes, including the Bani Hajer and Al Murrah, extended their operations southward from Qatar. The Qubaisat settlers also became implicated in irregular maritime activities.

A significant incident occurred in 1876 when a baghlah (a type of boat) belonging to an Abu Dhabi subject was attacked near Jassim's residence in Al Bidda. The attack resulted in two deaths, one injury, and the theft of property valued at 529 dollars, as well as an African slave valued at 120 dollars. In response, Zayed demanded compensation of 2,679 dollars for the stolen property and blood money for the casualties.

Other select instances of piracy, particularly at Khor Al Adaid, are given by historical British accounts during the summer of 1876:

- "In the month of August a rumour reached the Officiating Resident, to the effect that another party of the Beni Hajir had seized a boat belonging to the Oman pearl divers at Odeid."
- "In the same month the Chief of Aboothabee complained that two of his boats, which had anchored in the Bay of Odeid, had been attacked from the shore, one man being wounded, and one killed."
- "Again in August a section of the Beni Hajir, residing at Odeid, under the rule of Sheikh Salim bin Shafee, embarked from that port, and made an attack upon a boat belonging to Guttur, from which property to the value of 400 was plundered."

=== External intervention ===
The conflict was exacerbated by broader regional dynamics. Jassim sought Ottoman support, while Zayed relied on British mediation. This reflected the emerging imperial rivalries in the Gulf region. British attempts at imposing themselves in the conflict were primarily directed at limiting the growing influence of the Ottomans.

== Timeline ==
=== 1881 ===
The first fighting between the two occurred in 1881, during the battles of Baynunah, Suwaihan and Al-Marsaf.

In December 1881, a significant incident occurred that further exacerbated tensions between Abu Dhabi and Qatar. Members of the Bani Hajer and other Bedouin tribes from the vicinity of Qatar conducted a raid in the territory of Abu Dhabi, resulting in the theft of several camels. These stolen animals were subsequently sold in Al Bidda, Qatar. This event prompted Sheikh Zayed of Abu Dhabi to consider retaliatory action. In response, Sheikh Jassim of Qatar mobilized support from the Arabs of Al Bidda and Al Wakrah. However, diplomatic efforts were not entirely abandoned. Jassim dispatched Muhammad bin Abdul Wahab to Zayed in an attempt to negotiate. Diplomacy ultimately proved successful, as the two leaders reached an understanding, temporarily averting further hostilities.

=== 1885 ===
In June 1885, the tensions between Qatar and Abu Dhabi resurfaced through diplomatic channels. Jassim addressed a formal communication to the Political Resident, reiterating his longstanding grievances against Zayed. This correspondence not only revisited previous points of contention but also revived Sheikh Jassim's proposal to occupy and repopulate Khor Al Adaid, a territory of strategic importance in the region. The British authorities, represented by the Political Resident, responded to Jassim's overture with a clear reiteration of the established governmental position regarding Khor Al Adaid. The Sheikh was explicitly requested to abandon his intentions concerning this territory.

Regarding Jassim's claims against Abu Dhabi, the Political Resident adopted a procedural approach. Jassim was invited to submit detailed particulars of his grievances, with the assurance that these would be subject to a thorough investigation to assess their merits. However, Jassim did not follow through with this request, failing to provide the requested specifics.

In the summer of 1885, a series of incidents further escalated tensions between the domains of Zayed and Jassim. The Al Bu Shaar branch of the Manasir tribe, affiliated with Zayed, conducted a raid on Bedouin encampments loyal to Jassim at Nuaija, a watering place in proximity to Al Bidda. This incursion resulted in the abduction of three female slaves.

In response to this transgression, Sheikh Jassim authorized retaliatory action, specifically instructing the Bani Hajer tribe to target Zayed's subjects, with particular emphasis on the Al Bu Shaar tribe. Subsequently, the Bani Hajer, in coalition with the Al Murrah tribe, executed a counter-raid into Bani Yas territory, taking six camels. One of these camels was the property of Zayed himself, while the others belonged to Sheikh Hasher bin Maktoum of Dubai. The stolen camels were transported to Al Bidda, where Jassim, in a diplomatic maneuver, presented two of them to the Sheikh of Bahrain, receiving a mare in reciprocation.

Zayed demanded the return of the camels from Jassim, citing the raiders' sanctuary in Al Bidda as justification. Jassim, countered with an allegation that the previous year, Mahomed bin Jeair of the Manasir tribe had similarly sought refuge in Bani Yas territory after plundering Qatari subjects. The situation deteriorated into a series of hostile exchanges and military preparations. However, diplomatic channels remained open, with Nasir bin Mubarak traveling to Abu Dhabi at Jassim's behest to negotiate a settlement. The resulting arrangement stipulated that Jassim would assume responsibility for any transgressions committed by his tribesmen against Zayed's subjects. Nevertheless, this agreement proved ineffective. When Zayed attempted to invoke its terms, Jassim responded by presenting a list of longstanding grievances against the Qubaisat tribe, effectively nullifying the arrangement. Consequently, hostilities persisted between the two sheikhs.

=== 1866 ===
In July 1886, Zayed formally lodged a complaint with the British Political Resident, alleging that Jassim had been engaging in a campaign to undermine Abu Dhabi's economic interests. Specifically, Zayed accused his counterpart of corresponding with inhabitants of islands under Abu Dhabi's jurisdiction who were indebted due to pearl fishing activities. The alleged objective of this communication was to encourage these debtors to repudiate their financial obligations, potentially destabilizing Abu Dhabi's economic structure.

Concurrently, Zayed brought a letter he had received from Jassim to the Political Resident's attention. This correspondence enclosed a communication from the commander of the Turkish steamer Zuhâf and conveyed Jassim's assertion that he had received authorization from Ottoman authorities to reconstruct Al Adaid. In his communication to the Political Resident, Zayed expressed strong opposition to Jassim's actions in general and specifically objected to the plans regarding Al Adaid.

The British response to these developments was swift and aimed at maintaining the status quo. Zayed was instructed to refrain from responding to these communications, while Jassim received another admonition against any interference with Al Adaid. When approached on the matter, the Ottoman authorities in Basra disavowed and censured the actions of the Zuhâf's commander in corresponding directly with the Chief of Abu Dhabi.

=== 1887 ===
In 1887, Jassim bin Mohammed, accompanied by Ottoman troops, led an expedition into Khor Al Adaid in southern Qatar to assert his claim over the territory. This action elicited strong British diplomatic protests to the Ottoman Porte, with the British Political Resident, Edward Ross, going so far as to threaten military intervention.

In August 1887, Zayed bin Khalifa lodged a formal complaint regarding a maritime incident involving Qatari vessels. According to Zayed's account, a baghlah (a type of traditional sailing vessel) originating from Al Wakrah, Qatar, allegedly engaged in acts of piracy. The vessel was reported to have first plundered a Bahraini boat in the vicinity of Ashat Island. Subsequently, the same vessel approached a baghla crewed by members of the Qubaisi tribe, who were engaged in pearl diving activities.

The report states that the Qubaisi divers, unaware of the impending threat, were caught off guard. The aggressors opened fire on the Qubaisi vessel, resulting in the death of a crew member identified as Ashkan. Zayed attributed this act of aggression to the instigation of Jassim, and Ali bin Rashid of Al Wakrah.

=== 1888 ===
Hostilities intensified markedly in 1888. Early in the year, a member of the Manasir tribe, nominally under Abu Dhabi's suzerainty, absconded with several camels and sought asylum in Qatar. This prompted Zayed to dispatch an envoy, Mohammed Saif Al Mazrouei, to Qatar to negotiate the return of the fugitive. Upon Jassim's refusal, Zayed ordered punitive raids against Qatar. In February 1888, approximately 400 men of the Al Bu Shaar branch of the Manasir, mounted on 200 camels, arrived at Nuaija, an area of Doha which held the town's main well. During their raid, they captured 40 slaves, while another raid outside the confines of Al Bidda saw the capture of a few more slaves. Jassim's forces attempted to apprehend the Manasir but to no avail.

In March 1888, Jassim launched a substantial retaliatory offensive against Abu Dhabi territory, mobilizing a coalition of allied tribes and securing limited Ottoman support. This included the utilization of a Turkish supply vessel to deliver provisions and armaments to the strategic coastal location of As Sila. The Qatari forces conducted extensive incursions into Abu Dhabi territory, targeting settlements in the Baynunah and Al Dhafra regions. The offensive resulted in significant material losses for Abu Dhabi, including the burning of 20 villages and numerous nomadic encampments and the reported capture of 400 camels and 22 local inhabitants. Qatari forces advanced as far as the Liwa area. In response to this incursion, Zayed lodged a formal protest with British authorities, asserting that the attack constituted a violation of existing maritime peace treaties.

The conflict escalated dramatically in August 1888 when Abu Dhabi forces, led by Zayed's son Khalifa, launched an attack on the Rawdat Al Khail region of Doha with approximately 5,000 cavalry and infantry troops, though the exact number is disputed. British accounts offer far lower estimates, at around 250 camel riders. This assault, sometimes referred to as the Third Destruction of Doha, resulted in significant damages and Qatari casualties, including the death of Jassim's second son, Ali bin Jassim (known as Jo'aan). At least 38 deaths, 40 wounded and 70 prisoners were recorded in British accounts, though according to Jassim, the Qatari casualties amounted to 50 dead and 50 taken prisoner. The attack was particularly effective as it occurred in the month of Ramadan during dawn prayer at a time when Jassim was 64 km (40 mi) away in Al Daayen, leaving Doha vulnerable.

In retaliation for this attack, Jassim prepared for a counterattack on Abu Dhabi. Planning an invasion, Jassim embarked on a comprehensive campaign to build alliances and undermine Abu Dhabi's support base. He reached out to three key powers; the Rashidi dynasty in Ha'il, the Ottoman Empire, and the Qawasim and other Ghafiri tribes in the Trucial Coast. These efforts were aimed at isolating Abu Dhabi and creating a coalition against Zayed. Jassim secured limited Ottoman support, including using a Turkish supply ship for logistical assistance.

Concurrently, Zayed sought to consolidate his own alliances. He intensified communications with regional powers such as Rashid bin Maktoum of Dubai and Faisal bin Turki Al Busaidi of Muscat and Oman, coordinating strategies for the anticipated Qatari assault. Zayed also appealed to his allies in the Trucial Coast emirates, although the response was mixed. While most Hinawi tribes pledged support, the ruler of Dubai provided only limited assistance in the form of a few guards. Zayed successfully exploited the enmity between Jassim and the ruler of Bahrain, Isa bin Ali Al Khalifa, to form an alliance with the latter.

=== 1889 ===
The conflict reached its climax with the Battle of Khannour from January to February 1889. Jassim, supported by limited Ottoman assistance, mobilized a diverse coalition of tribal forces, numbering over 1,000 men according to some sources. Razing several villages on the way, Qatari forces captured the fort of Khannour in Abu Dhabi territory after 20 days of siege. Following this victory, Qatari forces conducted extensive raids across Abu Dhabi territory, reaching as far as Al Ain and Al Buraimi.

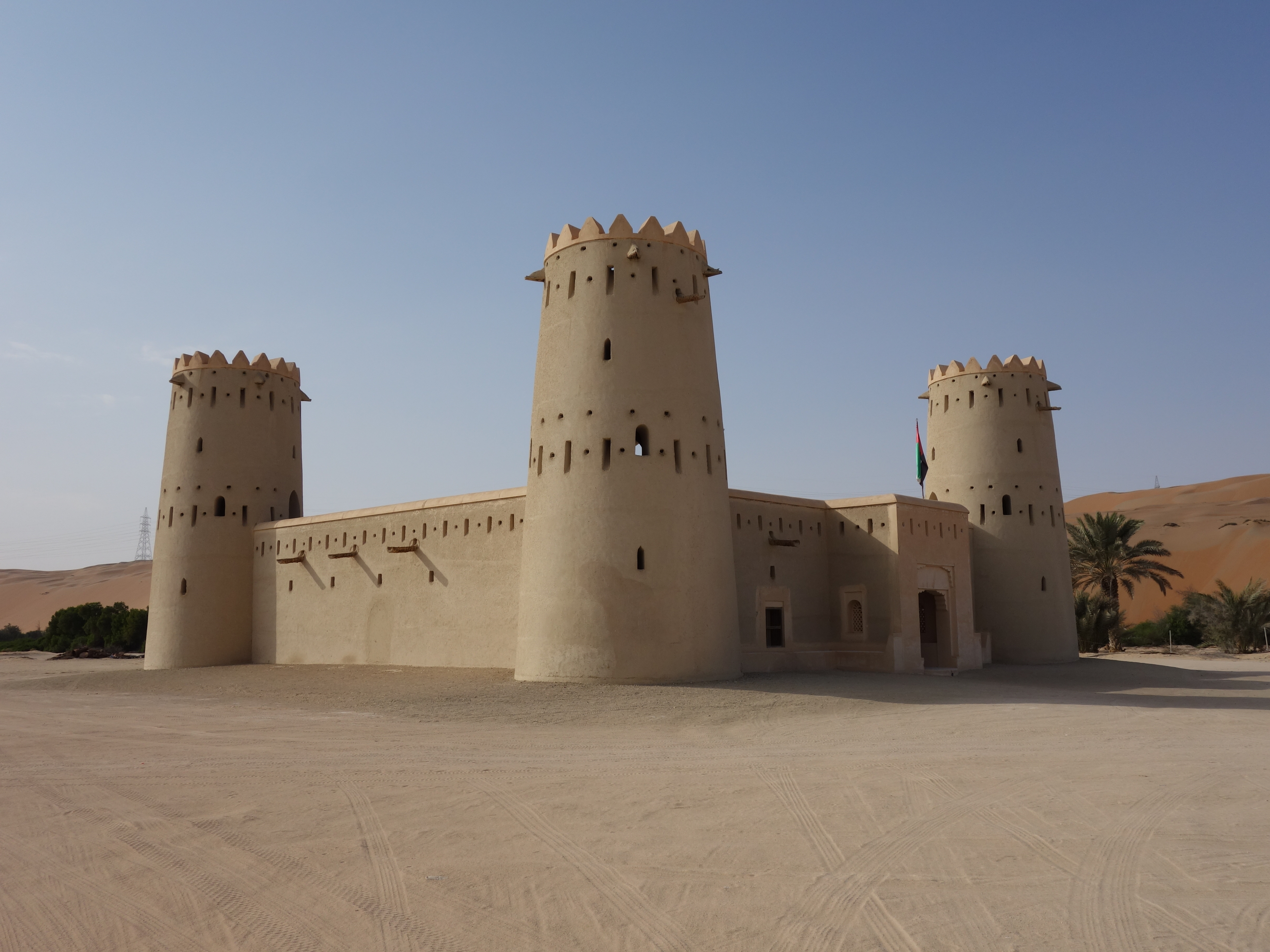
Al Jabbana Fort, one of the strategic locations sacked by Qatari forces in 1889

Although exact casualty figures are disputed, reports suggest that over 500 men from Abu Dhabi's forces were killed. Following the capture of the fort, Jassim split his forces into five sections and assigned his brother Ahmed to carry out further raids in Abu Dhabi territory. The intensity and frequency of these raids prompted concern among other regional powers, with sources mentioning that the Sultan of Oman requested the Sheikh of Ras Al Khaimah to block mountain passes to impede the advance of Qatari forces. Al Jabbana Fort was one of the important locations razed by Qatari forces. Jassim's forces withdrew in February 1889.

Jassim's motivations for this invasion were largely driven by a desire for retribution, particularly in response to the death of his son and the perceived humiliation of his people. This sentiment is evident in Jassim's correspondence with the British Resident on 17 February, 1889, where he justified his actions as a response to the oppression of his people and the loss of his son.

Although Jassim was successful in besieging Khannour Fort, his ambitions for a large-scale invasion were not fully realized due to several factors, including limited support from Ibn Rashid and conflicting interests among potential allies. However, Jassim's campaign successfully instilled fear in the other rulers of the Trucial Coast, serving as a deterrent to any future military incursions.

Following the battle was a period of diplomatic maneuvering and further skirmishes between the two emirates, culminating in a retaliatory offensive campaign along the Qatari Peninsula and Al-Ahsa in April 1889 by Zayed, who the rulers of Dubai and Muscat and Oman assisted. Zayed withdrew after being warned by the Ottoman representative in Qatar. In May 1889, Zayed, along with some Bani Yas tribesmen, attempted to garner support from the rulers of the Trucial Coast for a renewed attack, but failed to gain any significant support. As a result, he launched only a minimal incursion into Khor Al Adaid, taking punitive measures against certain tribes there.

The British Political Resident in the Persian Gulf, perceiving the conflict as a threat to regional stability, attempted to mediate between the two parties in October 1889, though these initial efforts were unsuccessful. However, in 1893, an agreement jointly brokered by the British and Ottomans resolved the long-standing conflict.

== Aftermath ==
The conflict resulted in a shift in the balance of power in the eastern Arabian Peninsula. Qatar, under Jassim, emerged as a significant military and political force. Conversely, Abu Dhabi's position was weakened, leading to a realignment of tribal allegiances in the region. In the years following the war, the relationship between Qatar and Abu Dhabi entered a new phase. While open hostilities ceased, tensions persisted. The conflict transitioned from military engagements to a more diplomatic form of confrontation, with both sides engaging in exchanges of accusations and protests through official channels.

In the immediate aftermath of the Battle of Khannour, diplomatic efforts intensified. British authorities, concerned about the potential for further escalation and Ottoman intervention, increased their involvement in mediating between Gulf rulers. This marked a shift in British policy towards more active engagement in inter-emirate disputes.

The conflict also had implications for the broader imperial rivalry between Britain and the Ottoman Empire in the Gulf. While the Ottoman Empire had provided some support to Qatar during the conflict, this was limited by British diplomatic pressure. Thus, the war served to reinforce British dominance in the region.

== See also ==
- History of Abu Dhabi
- History of Qatar
- Ottoman Arabia
