= Suwayd =

Suwayd or Suwaidi may refer to:

- Al Suwaidi an Arabic given name meaning "dark-coloured, black" (from أسود "black") and the singular of the Emirati tribal name Sudan.
  - one of the ansar (followers of Muhammad) mentioned by Al-Waqidi
  - a follower of Muhammad whose name is reported as "Tariq ibn Suwayd or Suwayd ibn Tariq" who received the injunction against alcohol in Sunan Abu Dawood (28.3864)
  - "Abu Suwayd and the Pretty Old Woman", a story in vol. 5 of 1001 Nights, see List of stories within One Thousand and One Nights
- the Arabic name of Sweden

== See also ==
- Al-Suwaidi (disambiguation)
- As-Suwayda
