= Al Bu Muhair =

Bedouin tribe of the United Arab Emirates

- Arab tribe
- Ethnicity: Arab
- Location: United Arab Emirates
- Language: Arabic
- Religion: Islam

The Al Bu Muhair (singular Al Muhairi or Al Mheiri or Al Mehairi) are a tribe of the United Arab Emirates (UAE), closely associated with the Bani Yas of Abu Dhabi but settled throughout the western coastal areas of the Emirates.

Some 500 members of the Al Bu Muhair left Dubai in 1841, dissatisfied with the rule of Maktoum bin Butti, who had led the Al Bu Falasah from Abu Dhabi to establish Dubai in 1833, and settled in Sharjah. That movement, combined with the impact of an outbreak of plague in Dubai, led to the temporary settlement of Deira and the virtual abandonment of Dubai, which was subsequently sacked by a force from Abu Dhabi under Khalifa bin Shakhbut Al Nahyan. A further contingent of the tribe left Dubai for Sharjah in 1852.

At the turn of the 20th century, the Al Bu Muhair were mostly settled, with a minority of some 20 households in Abu Dhabi still following a Bedouin lifestyle. At the time, some 500 Muhair were settled in Abu Dhabi, with another 500 members of the tribe living in Al Bateen. The Bateen settlement and its associated creek, Khor Al Bateen, were south of Al Maqta and consisted of some 130 areesh houses made of barasti, or date branches. Of these, 30 houses, some 150 people, were members of the Sudan tribe and another 100 Muhair.

Elsewhere on the coast, the Al Bu Muhair were found in Dubai (400 houses); Al Khan (60 houses); Sharjah (60 houses); Ajman (80 houses); Umm Al Quwain (30 houses) and 120 houses in Ras Al Khaimah. Walker, in 1901, disagrees with Lorimer's 1906 estimate and puts the number of Al Bu Muhair in Ras Al Khaimah as 200 houses, divided equally between areesh and stone/gypsum construction. The Al Bu Muhair first settled in Ras Al Khaimah from Abu Dhabi with the establishment of Al Qawasim rule in the 1750s.

== Notable members ==
Notable members of the Al Bu Muhair in the Emirates today include Mariam Almheiri, Head of International Affairs Office at the Presidential Court of the United Arab Emirates and former Minister for Environment and Climate Change, and paralympian Ahmed Saif Zaal Abu Muhair.
