= House of Al Falahi =

Tribal clan

The House of Al Falahi is a tribal Emirati clan that belongs to the Bani Yas tribal confederation. The ruling family of Al Nahyan of the Emirate of Abu Dhabi, of which the president of the United Arab Emirates, Mohammed bin Zayed Al Nahyan, is a part, comes from this house and tribe. It is also blood-related to the House of Al Falasi, and Al Maktoum, the ruling family of the Emirate of Dubai, is a branch of it.

== Bani Yas ==
The Al Bu Falah have historically constituted a small subsection of the Bani Yas, numbering, according to J. G. Lorimer, approximately 15 to 20 households. The group is also known as the Al Nahyan and has traditionally supplied the paramount shaykh of the Bani Yas, who served as the ruler of Abu Dhabi.

The Al Bu Falah owned date gardens and residences in seven villages in the Liwa region, although most members did not reside there permanently. During the winter months, they lived in the desert with their camels, while in the summer many participated in pearling expeditions aboard vessels owned by other sections of the Bani Yas.

The Al Bu Falah were the first among the Bani Yas to acquire property in the Buraimi Oasis, a practice that has been systematically continued by members of the ruling family. As a result, much of the land formerly associated with the Al Bu Falah village of Muwaiji is now held by the heirs of Muhammad bin Khalifah (d. 1979), with additional holdings belonging to Shaikha Latifah bint Zayid (d. 1979) and other members of the ruling family.

Muhammad bin Khalifah also owned the majority of the date gardens in Masudi, as well as holdings in Hili, Al Ain, Qattarah, and Mutirid. The sons of Sultan bin Zayid—Khalid, Hazza, and Zayid, the latter later serving as ruler—subsequently inherited and acquired date gardens in Jimi, Al Ain, Qattarah, and Jahili. In more recent years, Shaikh Zayid and other members of the ruling family established new agricultural holdings outside the traditional villages, including in areas such as Mazyad.

== Notable people ==
- Mohammed Ateeq Al-Falahi

== See also ==
- Royal families of the United Arab Emirates
