= Battle of Khannour =

Armed conflict in the United Arab Emirates

- Part of Qatari–Abu Dhabi War
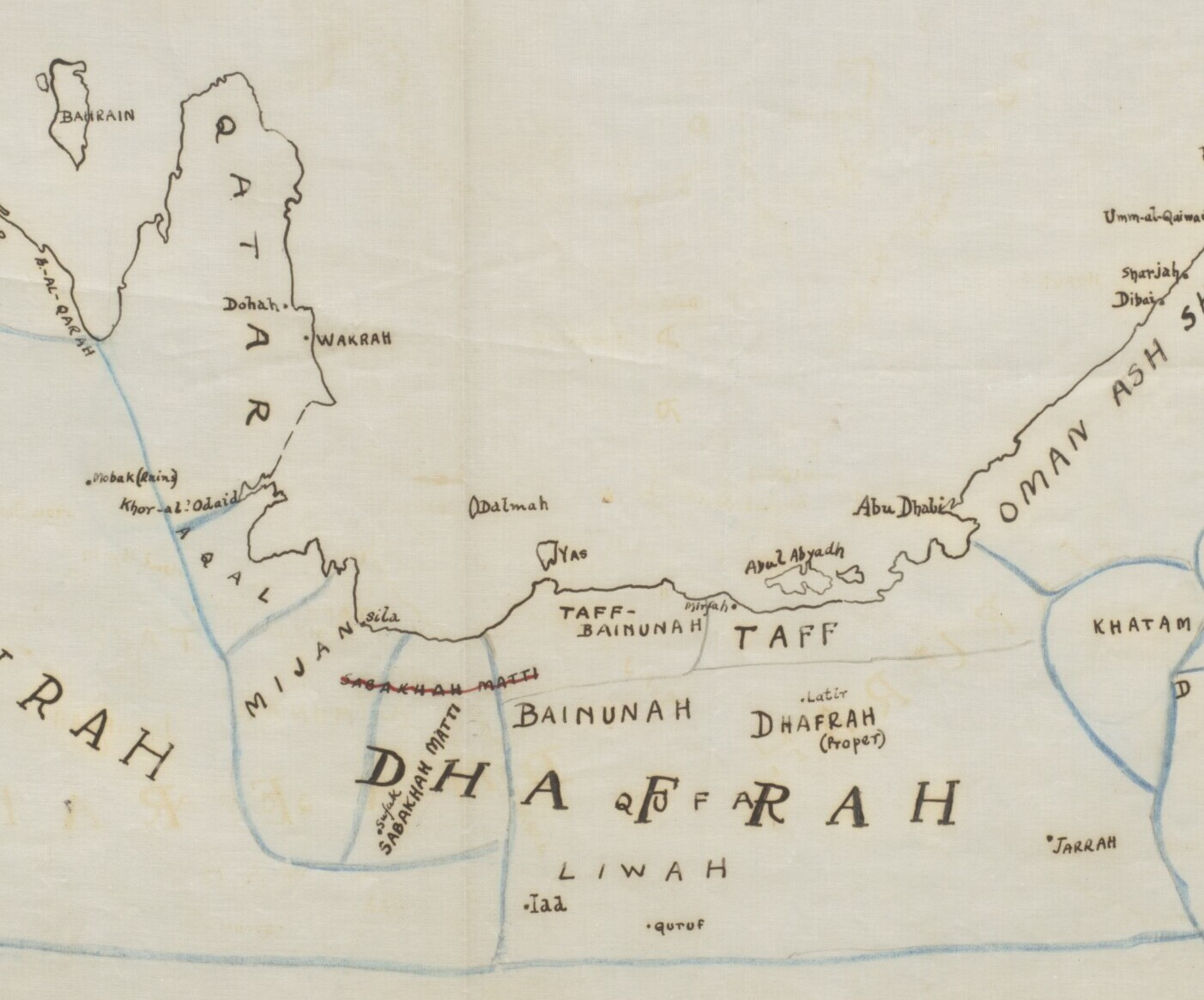
- Rudimentary sketch map depicting Qatar and Abu Dhabi produced by the British government in 1926
Date	January–February 1889
Location	Emirate of Abu Dhabi, Trucial States
Result	Qatari victory

Belligerents
Abu Dhabi	Qatar; Supported by: Ottoman Empire

Commanders and leaders
Zayed bin Khalifa Al Nahyan; Khalifa bin Zayed bin Khalifa Al Nahyan	Jassim bin Mohammed Al Thani; Ahmed bin Muhammed Al Thani

Strength
50 men	1,000+ men 1 Ottoman merchant ship

Casualties and losses
45 killed	Unknown

The Battle of Khannour (Arabic: وقعة خنور) was a series of military engagements between the forces of Abu Dhabi led by Zayed bin Khalifa Al Nahyan and Qatar under Jassim bin Mohammed Al Thani that took place in the Emirate of Abu Dhabi, Trucial States from January to February 1889. The conflict centered around the eponymous fortress of Khannour in Abu Dhabi and extended to several regions within the Emirate, including Liwa, Al Dhafra and Al Ain.

Resulting from long-standing territorial disputes and tribal rivalries which evolved into a full blown war, the battle marked a crucial turning point in Gulf politics of the late 19th century. Qatari forces, numbering between 500 and 1,000 men and supported by limited Ottoman assistance, achieved a decisive victory, capturing Khannour Fort and advancing deep into Abu Dhabi territory.

The conflict ended after Jassim withdrew his forces from the Emirate, partially due to British diplomatic intervention, though skirmishes continued intermittently until 1892. The battle is considered a pivotal event in Qatar's emergence as a distinct political entity and had lasting implications for the geopolitical landscape of the Persian Gulf, significantly altering the balance of power in the region and accelerating the decline of traditional tribal structures while increasing both British and Ottoman involvement in Gulf affairs.

== Background ==
The campaign was the culmination of long-standing tensions between Qatar and Abu Dhabi, rooted in territorial disputes and tribal allegiances along their shared border. These conflicts were exacerbated by the complex interplay of Ottoman and British imperial interests in the Gulf region during the late 19th century.

Sheikh Zayed bin Khalifa Al Nahyan ascended to power in Abu Dhabi in 1855, while Sheikh Jassim bin Mohammed Al Thani became the ruler of Qatar in 1878. Both leaders sought to consolidate their power and expand their influence in the region. Qatar, under Jassim, had aligned itself with the Ottoman Empire, while Abu Dhabi maintained closer ties with Britain, creating a backdrop of conflicting imperial interests.

Throughout the 1880s, tensions were escalated through a series of raids and counter-raids between the two emirates. The first fighting between the two occurred in 1881, during the battles of Baynunah, Suwaihan and Al-Marsaf. In 1887, Jassim bin Mohammed, accompanied by Ottoman troops, led an expedition into Khor Al Adaid in southern Qatar to assert his claim over the territory, which was disputed with Zayed bin Khalifa. This action elicited strong British diplomatic protests to the Ottoman Porte, with the British Political Resident, Edward Ross, going so far as to threaten military intervention.

Hostilities intensified markedly in 1888. Early in the year, a member of the Manasir tribe, nominally under Abu Dhabi's suzerainty, absconded with several camels and sought asylum in Qatar. This prompted Zayed to dispatch an envoy, Mohammed Saif Al Mazrouei, to Qatar to negotiate the return of the fugitive. Upon Jassim's refusal, Zayed ordered punitive raids against Qatar. In February 1888, approximately 400 men of the Al Bu Shaar branch of the Manasir, mounted on 200 camels, arrived at Nuaija, an area of Doha which held the town's main well. During their raid, they captured 40 slaves, while another raid outside the confines of Al Bidda saw the capture of a few more slaves. Jassim's forces attempted to apprehend the Manasir but to no avail.

In March 1888, Jassim launched a substantial retaliatory offensive against Abu Dhabi territory, mobilizing a coalition of allied tribes and securing limited Ottoman support. This operation involved intricate logistical coordination, including the utilization of a Turkish supply vessel to deliver provisions and armaments to the strategic coastal location of As Sila. The Qatari forces conducted extensive incursions into Abu Dhabi territory, targeting settlements in the Baynunah and Al Dhafra regions. The offensive resulted in significant material losses for Abu Dhabi, including the burning of 20 villages and numerous nomadic encampments and the reported capture of 400 camels and 22 local inhabitants. Qatari forces demonstrated considerable operational reach, penetrating as far as the Liwa area. In response to this incursion, Zayed lodged a formal protest with British authorities, asserting that the attack constituted a violation of existing maritime peace treaties.

The conflict escalated dramatically in August 1888 when Abu Dhabi forces, led by Zayed's son Khalifa, launched an attack on the Rawdat Al Khail region of Doha with approximately 5,000 cavalry and infantry troops, though the exact number is disputed in different accounts. British accounts offer far lower estimates, at around 250 camel riders. This assault, sometimes referred to as the Third Destruction of Doha, resulted in significant damages and Qatari casualties, including the death of Jassim's son, Ali bin Jassim (known as Jo'aan). At least 38 deaths, 40 wounded and 70 prisoners were recorded in British accounts, though according to Jassim, the Qatari casualties amounted to 50 dead and 50 taken prisoner. The attack was particularly effective as it occurred in the month of Ramadan during dawn prayer at a time when Jassim was 64 km (40 mi) away in Al Daayen, leaving Doha vulnerable.

In retaliation, Jassim mobilized a substantial force, including various allied tribes and secured Ottoman support in the form of a supply ship. He prepared for a counterattack against Abu Dhabi, which would ultimately lead to the Battle of Khannour in early 1889. Jassim sought to justify his planned actions to the British authorities, framing them as a response to the attack on Doha and emphasizing the death of his son. Meanwhile, Zayed appealed to the British for support against potential Qatari aggression.

== Chronology ==
=== Prelude ===
Preceding the invasion, Sheikh Jassim of Qatar embarked on a campaign to build alliances and undermine Abu Dhabi's support base. He reached out to three key powers; the Rashidi dynasty in Ha'il, the Ottoman Empire, and the Qawasim and other Ghafiri tribes in the Trucial Coast. These efforts were aimed at isolating Abu Dhabi and creating a coalition against Zayed. Jassim secured limited Ottoman support, including use of a Turkish supply ship for logistical assistance.

Concurrently, Sheikh Zayed of Abu Dhabi sought to consolidate his own alliances. He intensified communications with regional powers such as Rashid bin Maktoum of Dubai and Faisal bin Turki Al Busaidi of Muscat and Oman, coordinating strategies for the anticipated Qatari assault. Zayed also appealed to his allies in the Trucial Coast emirates, although the response was mixed. While most Hinawi tribes pledged support, the ruler of Dubai provided only limited assistance in the form of a few guards. Zayed successfully exploited the enmity between Jassim and the ruler of Bahrain, Isa bin Ali Al Khalifa, to form an alliance with the latter.

The British authorities, wary of the conflict escalating into a broader confrontation involving Ottoman interests, engaged in active diplomacy. The Political Resident, Edward Ross, sent a series of letters to both Jassim and Zayed, attempting to mediate and contain the conflict. Ross even visited Doha to assess the situation personally and gauge Jassim's intentions and capabilities.

=== Beginning of invasion ===
In preparation for the conflict, Jassim assembled a substantial force comprising various tribal contingents. According to Qatari sources, his army included 50 cavalry from the Na'im and Maadeed tribes, 20 cavalry from the Al Murrah tribe, 25 camel riders from the Buainain tribe, 7 camel riders from the Bu Kuwara tribe, 70 cavalry from the Manasir tribe, about 100 camel riders from the Al Muhanda tribe, and approximately 1,000 camel riders from other allied tribes, including several contingents from Ha'il tribes. However, British diplomats at the time wrote that Qatar's force did not exceed 500 fighting men.

Anticipating the attack, Zayed positioned his forces near the island of Abu Dhabi to compel the Qatari army to traverse a long desert route, potentially weakening them before engagement. Although Zayed had received scant reinforcements from his allies, his force was still far smaller in size than Jassim's.

The Qatari forces, led by Jassim, initiated their attack on Abu Dhabi territory from January to February 1889. They advanced towards the Khannour Fort, a strategic stronghold in the Emirate built by the Bani Yas early in Shakhbut bin Dhiyab Al Nahyan's reign. According to British records, the fort was described as being made of brick, with two watch towers, rising to a height of 6 or 7 feet (1.8 or 2.1 m).

As the Qatari forces approached, they encountered resistance from defenders. The initial assault was particularly fierce, compelling many of the local inhabitants, including members of the Manasir and Bani Yas tribes, to abandon their homes and seek refuge in the fort or flee towards the coast. The Qatari army's advance resulted in the destruction of numerous palm groves and settlements in their path.

=== Battle ===
As the majority of Abu Dhabi's forces retreated to the fortress, a contingent primarily composed of Manasir tribesmen attempted a strategic deception. They sought to exploit tribal kinship by appealing to their relatives within Jassim's army, ostensibly to negotiate a truce. Initially, this ploy appeared successful, with the Manasir in Jassim's forces interceding on behalf of their kinsmen. However, upon exiting the fortress, the Abu Dhabi-aligned Manasir attempted to secure reinforcements to counter Jassim's forces.

When Jassim became aware of this, he considered withdrawing from the fortress to preempt the arrival of reinforcements for Zayed's forces. However, Jassim's brother, Ahmed and other advisors advocated for an immediate assault on the fortress.

The siege of Khannour Fort lasted approximately twenty days. During this period, Jassim and Ahmed led the Qatari forces in a concerted effort to breach the fort's defenses. Eventually, under the cover of night, Jassim's forces managed to penetrate the fort's defenses, breaking down its gates and capturing it by dawn.

Throughout the battle, there were reports of intense close-quarters combat and significant casualties on both sides. While some accounts suggest that women were among the casualties, other sources indicate that Jassim ordered the safe evacuation of women from the fort after its capture.

=== Subsequent raids and skirmishes ===
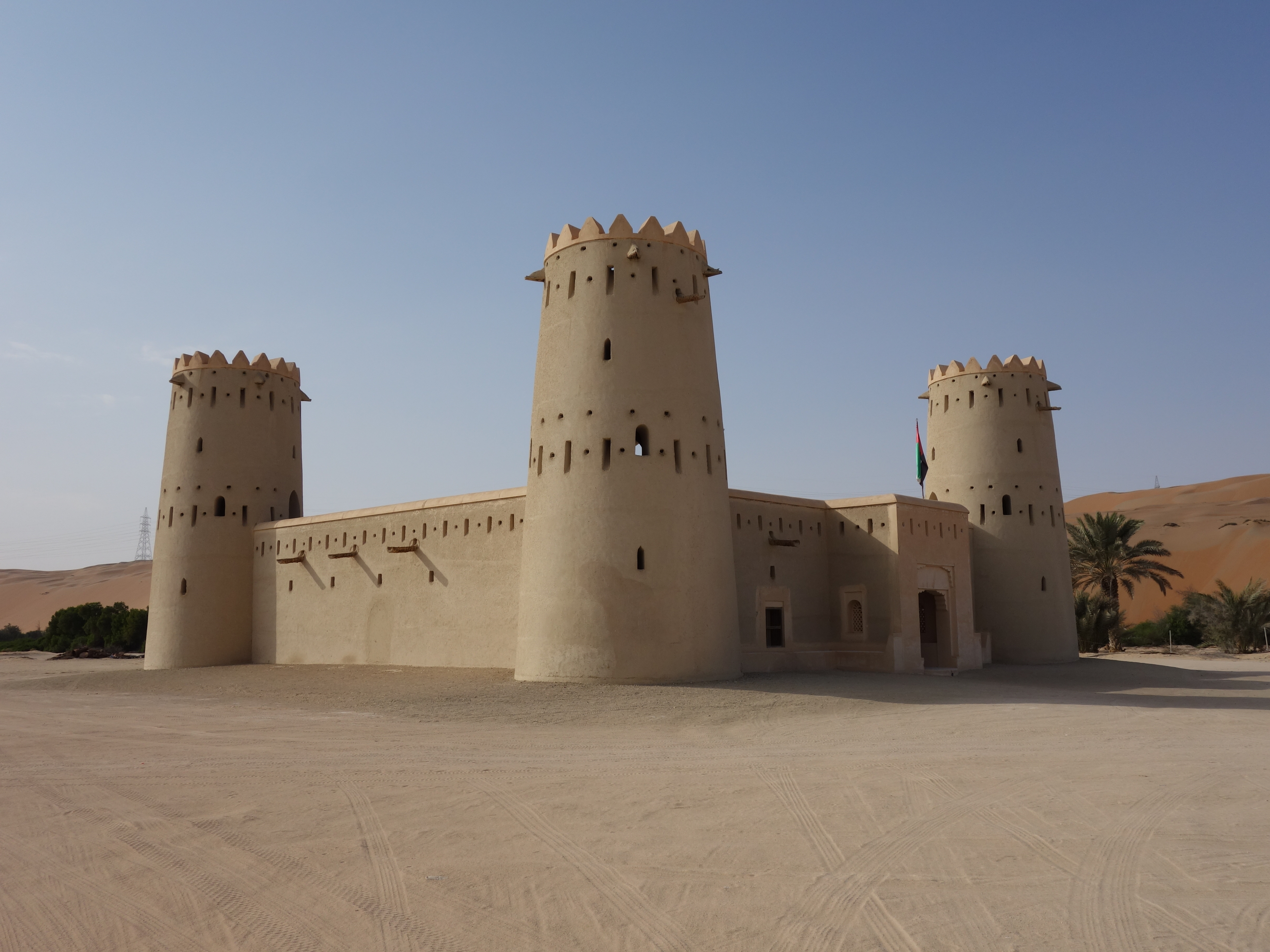
Al Jabbana Fort

Following the capture of Khannour Fort, Jassim capitalized on his strategic advantage to expand Qatar's military operations across Abu Dhabi territory. He divided his forces into five sections, orchestrating a series of raids and incursions that extended the conflict beyond the immediate vicinity of Khannour. Qatari forces penetrated deep into the Emirate, reaching as far as Al Ain and Al Buraimi. The raids were not confined to military targets but also impacted civilian areas and economic resources.

Jassim's brother, Ahmed, played a significant role in leading some of these operations while Jassim maintained his command center at Khannour Fort. Under Ahmed's command, Qatari forces raided various settlements, captured livestock, and sought to assert control over strategically important locations. Al Jabbana Fort was one of the important locations razed by Qatari forces. The intensity and frequency of these raids prompted concern among other regional powers, with sources mentioning that the Sultan of Oman requested the Sheikh of Ras Al Khaimah to block mountain passes to impede the advance of Qatari forces. Jassim's forces withdrew in February 1889.

=== Casualties and aftermath ===
The campaign resulted in significant casualties on both sides, though exact figures are disputed. Reports suggest that over 500 men from Abu Dhabi's forces were killed, while Qatari losses are less clearly documented. Jassim's motivations were largely driven by a desire for retribution, particularly in response to the death of his son and the perceived humiliation of his people. This sentiment is evident in Jassim's correspondence with the British Resident on 17 February, 1889, where he attempted to frame his actions as a response to the oppression of his people.

Although Jassim was successful in besieging Khannour Fort and subsequent raids, a large-scale invasion was not fully realized due to several factors, including limited support from Ibn Rashid and conflicting interests among potential allies. However, Jassim's campaign successfully instilled fear in the other rulers of the Trucial Coast, serving as a deterrent to future military incursions.

The battle's aftermath led to a period of diplomatic maneuvering and further skirmishes between the two emirates, culminating in a retaliatory offensive campaign along the Qatari Peninsula and Al-Ahsa in April 1889 by Zayed, who was assisted by the rulers of Dubai and Muscat and Oman. Zayed withdrew after being warned by the Ottoman representative in Qatar. In May 1889, Zayed, along with some Bani Yas tribesmen, attempted to garner support from the rulers of the Trucial Coast for a renewed attack, but failed to gain any significant support. As a result, he launched only a minimal incursion into Khor Al Adaid, taking punitive measures against certain tribes there.

The capture of Khannour Fort by Qatari forces prompted concern among other Persian Gulf rulers and drew the attention of British authorities in the region. The British Political Resident in the Persian Gulf, perceiving the conflict as a threat to regional stability, attempted to mediate between the two parties in October 1889, though these initial efforts were unsuccessful. However, in 1893, an agreement jointly brokered by the British and Ottomans resolved the long-standing conflict.
