= Rawdat Al Khail =

Rawdat Al Khail روضة الخيل
- District
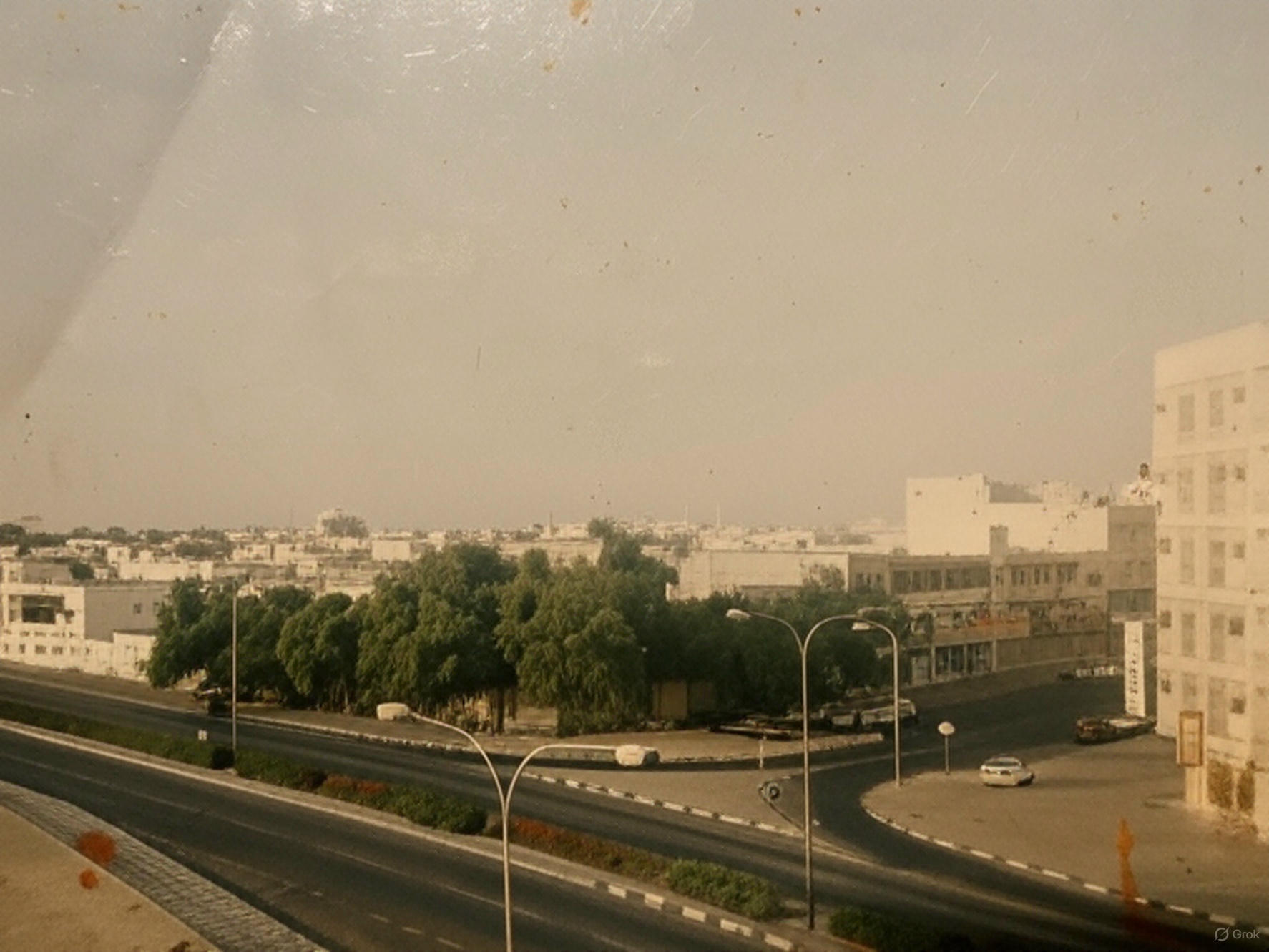
- Rawdat Al Khail Street in 2001

- Location within Doha Location within Qatar
- Coordinates: 25°16′15″N 51°31′10″E
- Country: Qatar
- Municipality: Doha
- Zone: Zone 24
- District no.: 20

Area
  - Total: 1.7 km^{2} (0.66 sq mi)

Population
  - Total: 17,219
  - Density: 10,000/km^{2} (26,000/sq mi)

Rawdat Al Khail (Arabic: روضة الخيل, romanized: Rawḑat al Khayl; also known as Al Muntazah) is a Qatari district in the municipality of Doha. It lies just outside the boundary of downtown Doha to the east. As part of the district's master plan, major mixed use developments are being carried along the arterial roads of C Ring Road and Salwa Road.

== History ==
In early 1888, Doha (then Al Bidda) was raided in a surprise attack by approximately 250 Bedouins from Abu Dhabi during the Qatari–Abu Dhabi War. According to local tradition, Ali bin Jassim Al Thani (known as Joaan), the second son of Jassim bin Mohammed Al Thani, had been praying in the Old Amiri Palace at the time he learned of this invasion. Once he finished praying, he recruited several fighters and traveled to Rawdat Al Khail for a last stand with the invaders despite having substantially fewer men. Sheikh Joaan was killed in the ensuing battle. In retaliation, the next year, Jassim launched a campaign penetrating deep into Abu Dhabi territory, culminating in the Battle of Khannour.

Rawdat Al Khail was the site of the first stage of a nationwide government housing program in the late 1960s. Completed in June 1969, this stage delivered 86 residential units of varying sizes, along with supporting infrastructure such as roads, electricity, and water. The project was part of early efforts to provide modern housing for low-income citizens.

== Central Municipal Council ==
Although free elections of the Central Municipal Council were first instated in Qatar in 1999, Rawdat Al Khail has only served as the seat of one of the 29 municipal constituencies since the fifth municipal elections in 2015. In the fifth session, Rawdat Al Khail was the seat of constituency no. 7 which also included Fereej Abdul Aziz and As Salatah al Jadidah. Abdullah Saeed Al Sulaiti was elected as the constituency representative.

== Transport ==
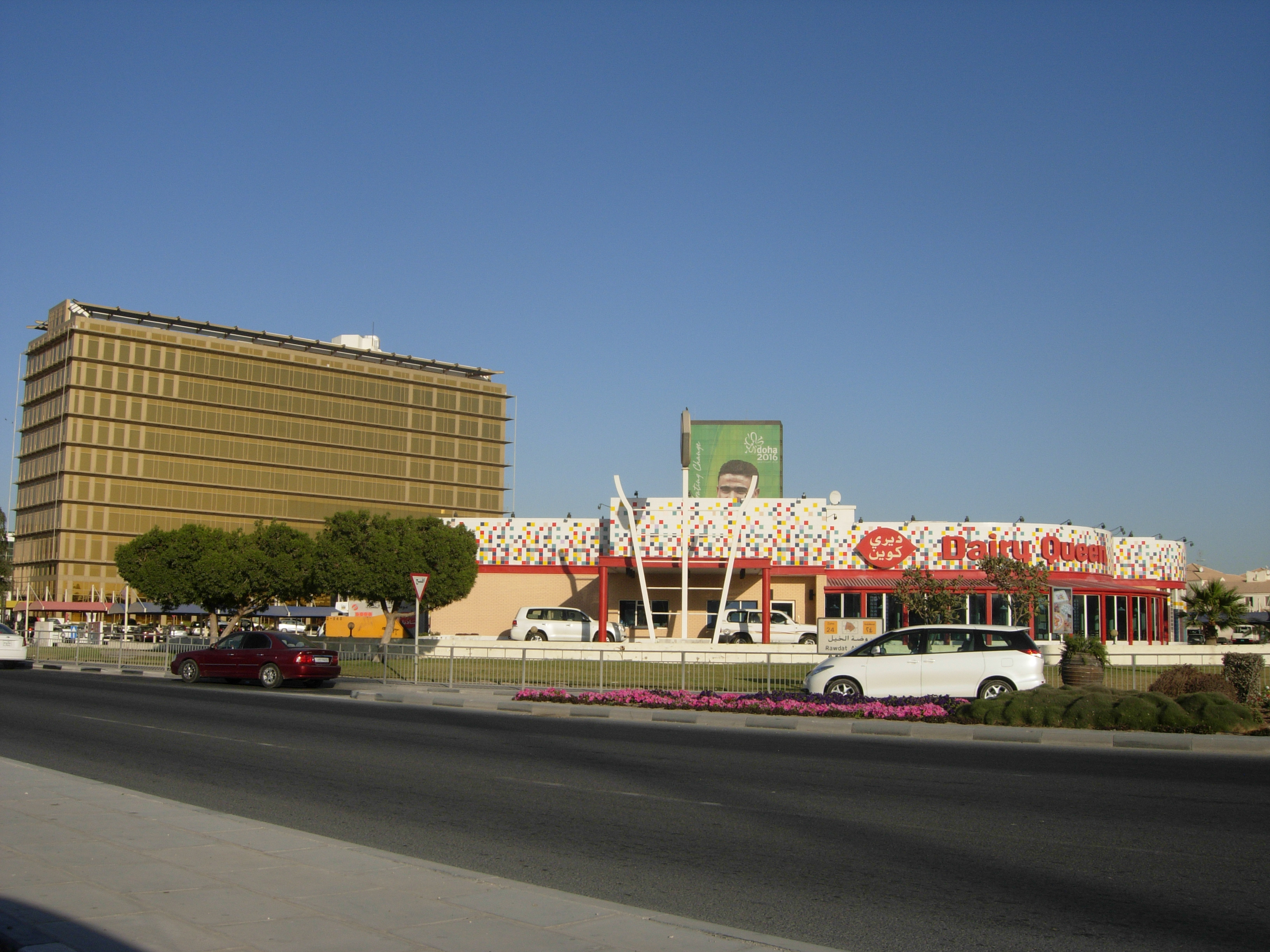
Businesses on Salwa Road in Rawdat Al Khail

Major roads that run through Rawdat Al Khail include B Ring Road, C Ring Road, Salwa Road and Rawdat Al Khail Street. Currently, the underground Al Muntazah Metro Station is under construction, having been launched during Phase 2B. Once completed, it will be part of Doha Metro's Blue Line.

== Visitor attractions ==
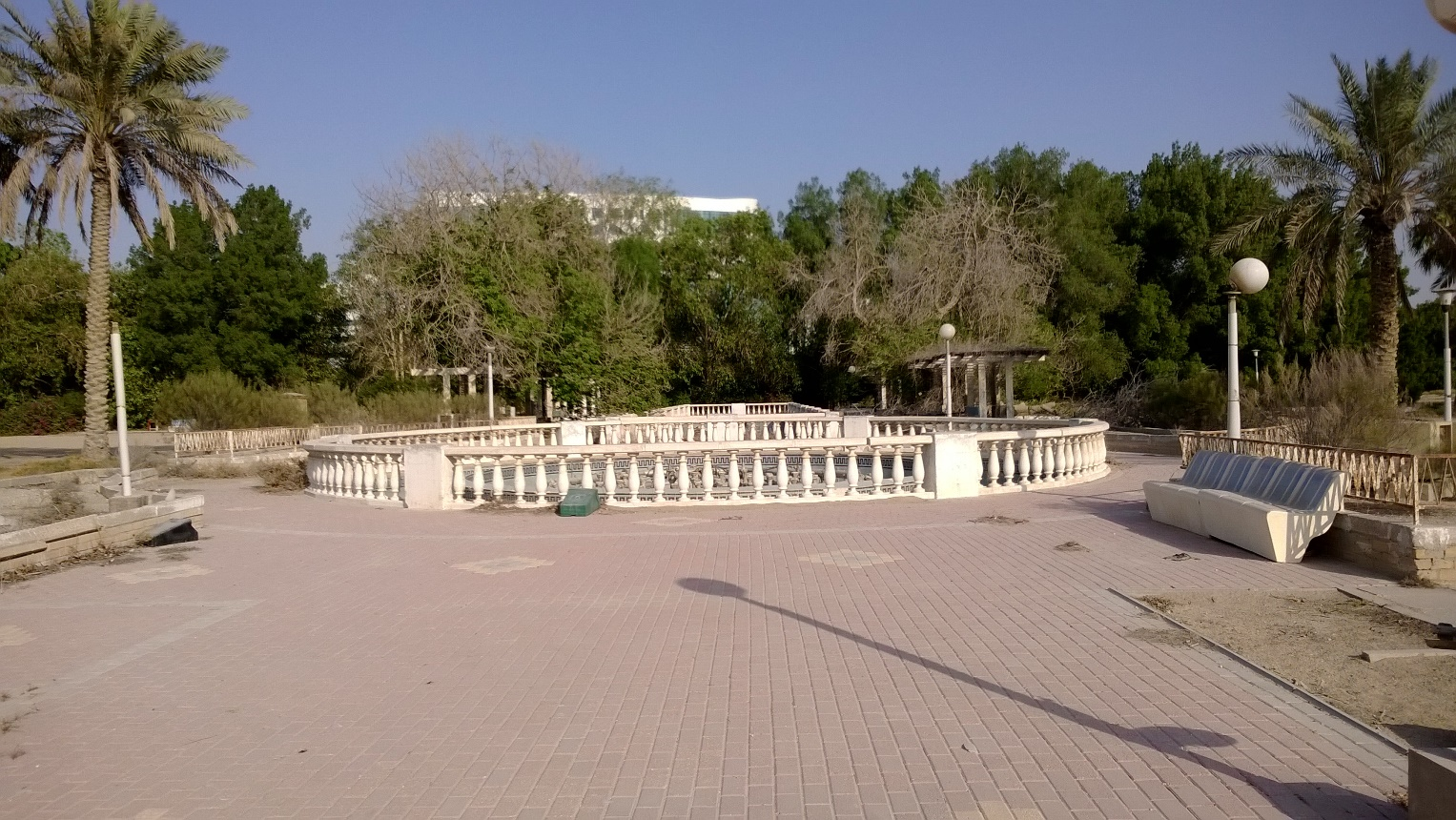
Rawdat Al Khail Park in 2013

Rawdat Al Khail Park, also known as Al Muntazah Park, represents one of the earliest constructed public parks within Doha. It is also among the largest parks in Qatar, at 140,000 square metres (1,500,000 sq ft). The second phase of park construction, which included footpaths and visitor facilities, was completed in 1980. The park is found at the crossing of Al Muntazah Street and C Ring Road. In 2013, UK-based LDA Design was selected to renovate the park to include modern amenities, such as sporting facilities, a café, and a children's playground.

In April 2022, the park was refurbished and inaugurated by the Minister of Municipality, Abdullah bin Abdulaziz bin Turki Al Subaie, in a ceremony attended by the Mayor of Wilmington, Delaware, Mike Purzycki, along with other officials. A tree symbolising friendship between Doha and Wilmington was planted during the event.

Facilities within the park include 1,183 metres (3,881 ft) of pedestrian walkways, a 1,119 metres (3,671 ft) jogging track, a 1,118 metres (3,668 ft) cycle path, children's play areas divided by age groups, as well as fitness zones with exercise equipment. The grounds also feature 98,000 square metres (1,050,000 sq ft) of landscaped green space and 1,600 trees.

== Qatar National Master Plan ==
The Qatar National Master Plan (QNMP) is described as a "spatial representation of the Qatar National Vision 2030". As part of the QNMP's Urban Centre plan, which aims to implement development strategies in 28 central hubs that will serve their surrounding communities, Rawdat Al Khail has been designated a District Centre, which is the lowest designation.

The District Centre is situated to the east of an already-existing commercial hub at the crossing C Ring Road and Salwa Road. This decision was made allow greater pedestrian accessibility within the District Centre, nonetheless, improving the lack of pedestrian-friendly infrastructure of the existing commercial area is also a stated objective of the centre plan. Metro stations can be found at both the eastern and western extremities of the District Centre. Current buildings in the District Centre include the Raddison Blue Hotel, a mall, residential villas and government organizations. Future construction will follow an orthogonal grid plan.

== Demographics ==
As of the 2010 census, the district comprised 4,897 housing units and 757 establishments. There were 17,219 people living in the district, of which 66% were male and 34% were female. Out of the 17,219 inhabitants, 77% were 20 years of age or older and 23% were under the age of 20. The literacy rate stood at 98.7%.

Employed persons made up 65% of the total population. Females accounted for 17% of the working population, while males accounted for 83% of the working population.

Year	Population
1986	8,035
1997	8,649
2004	10,391
2010	17,219

== Education ==
The following schools are located in Rawdat Al Khail:

Name of School	Curriculum	Grade	Genders	Official Website	Ref
Abu Bakr Assedeeq Preparatory Independent Boys	Independent	Secondary	Male-only	N/A	
Al Huda Kindergarten	Independent	Kindergarten	Both	N/A	

== Gallery ==
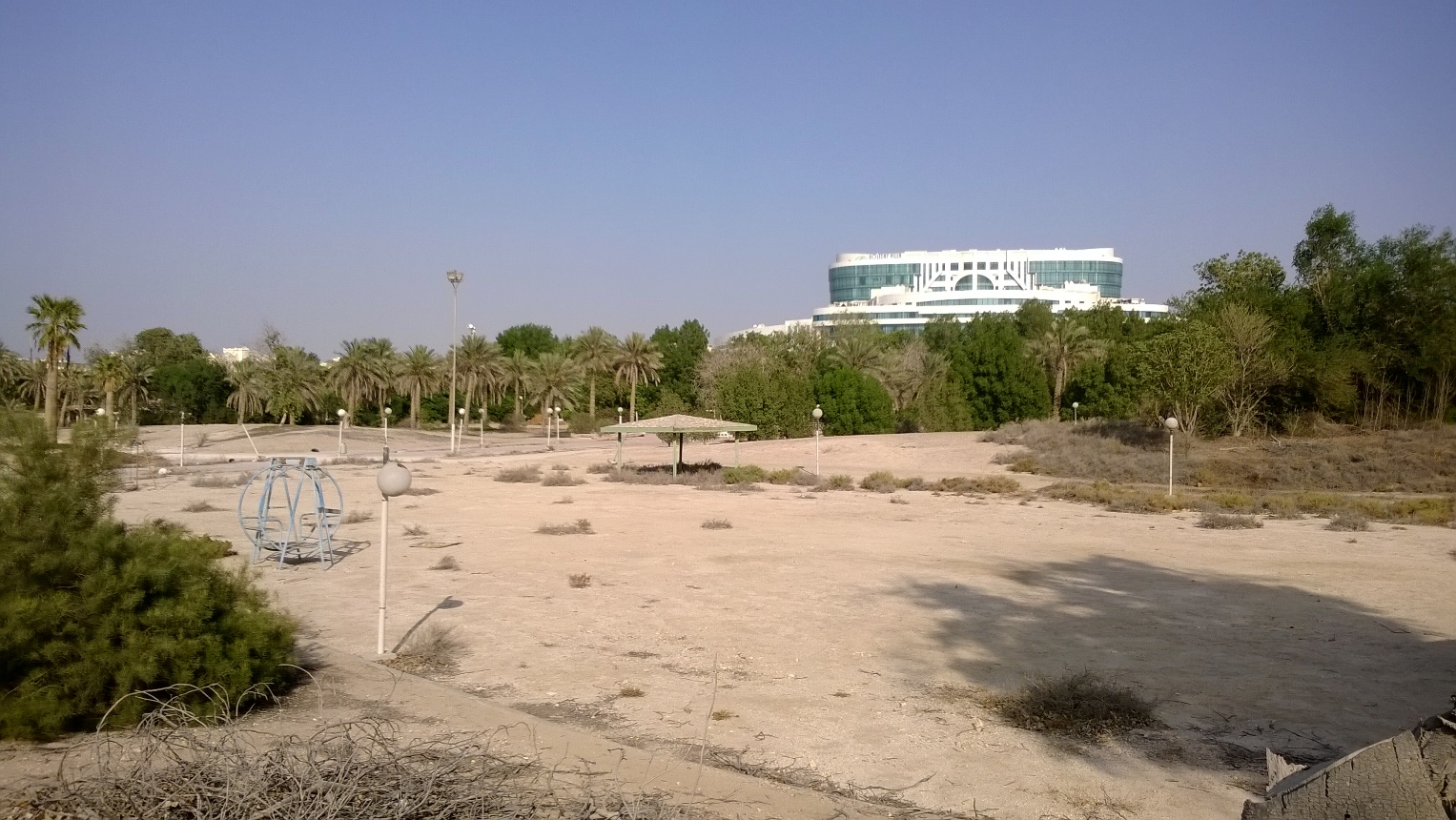
Rawdat Al Khail Park, also known as Al Muntazah Park, in Rawdat Al Khail
