= House of Al Falasi =

Bedouin tribe of the United Arab Emirates

House of Al Falasi آل بو فلاسة
- Royal house
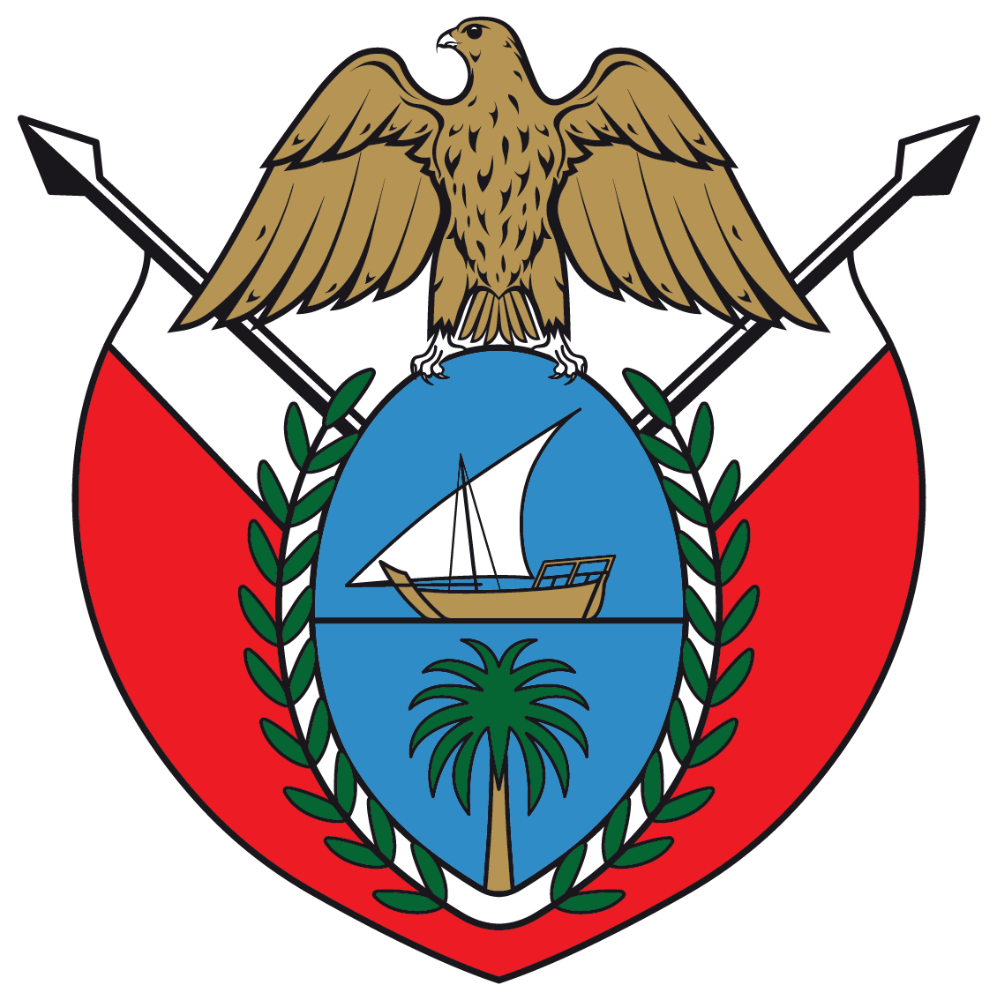
- Coat of arms of Dubai
- Parent family: Bani Yas
- Country: United Arab Emirates (Dubai) – major; Qatar, Bahrain, Saudi Arabia – minor
- Founded: 9 July 1833; 193 years ago
- Founder: Maktoum bin Butti Al Maktoum
- Current head: Mohammed bin Rashid Al Maktoum
- Titles: Vice President of the United Arab Emirates; Prime Minister of the United Arab Emirates; Deputy Prime Minister of the United Arab Emirates; Ruler of Dubai; Crown Prince of Dubai; Ruler of Dubai
- Style: His Highness Sheikh
- Connected families: House of Nahyan
- Estates: Zabeel Palace; Nad Al Sheba Palace
- Cadet branches: Al Maktoum

The House of Al Falasi (Arabic: قبيلة البوفلاسة) is both a name of a tribe and a name of its Al Maktoum branch (ruling family of Dubai).

== History ==
The Al Maktoum family descends from the Al Bu Falasah (now known as Al Falasi) section of the Bani Yas, a tribal federation that has been the dominant power throughout most of what is now the United Arab Emirates. In 1833, a large group of the Al Bu Falasah section of the Bani Yas seceded to Dubai during the pearling season, under the leadership of Maktoum bin Butti bin Sohal, escaping the violence of Sheikh Khalifah of Abu Dhabi. Dubai was readily given up to them by its wali. The following autumn, the bulk of their relatives joined them and virtually all of the Al Bu Falasah were domiciled in Dubai from then on.

Sheikh Maktoum bin Hasher Al Maktoum (Ruler from 1894 to 1906) convinced merchants from Lingeh in Iran to stay in the city by assuring zero taxation. A more modern cosmopolitan city as well as a business friendly orientation was later established, which is what Dubai is now known for. By the 1930s, the population of Dubai had nearly reached 20,000, a quarter of whom were expatriates.

In the 1950s, the Dubai Creek began to silt up. The late Ruler of Dubai, Sheikh Rashid bin Saeed Al Maktoum, commissioned the dredging of the waterway; resulting in an increased volume of cargo handling in Dubai, reinforcing Dubai's position as a re-export and trading hub.

== Timeline of Rulers of Dubai ==
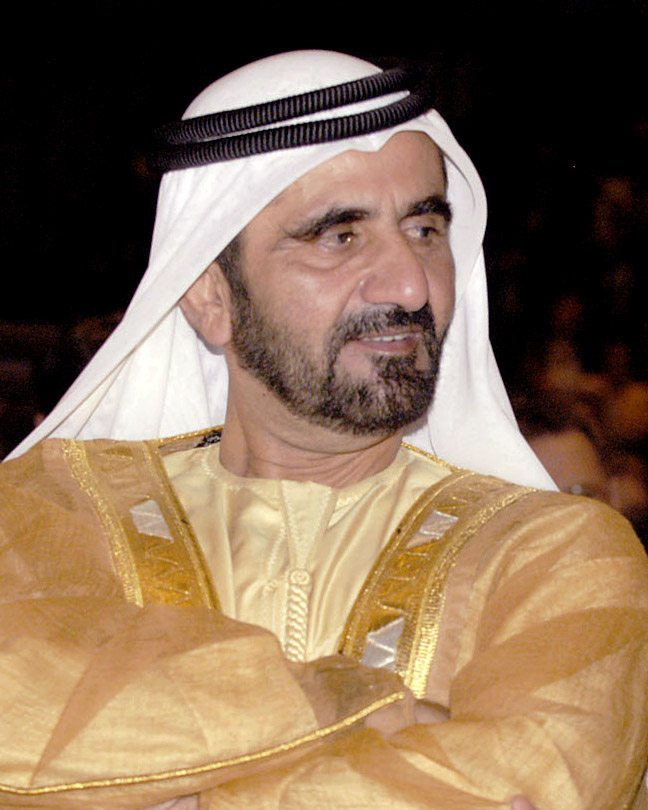
Sheikh Mohammed, Current Ruler of Dubai

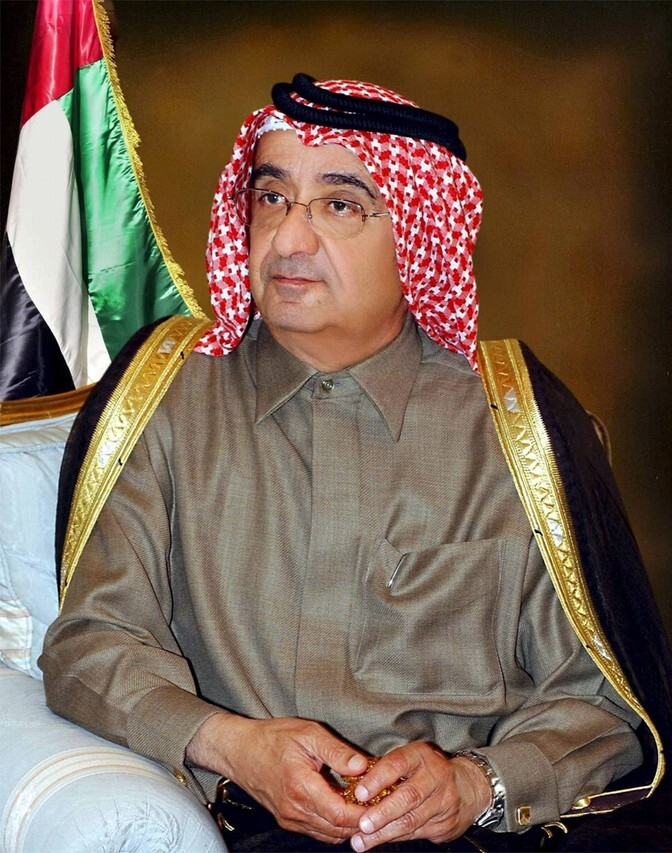
Sheikh Maktoum bin Rashid

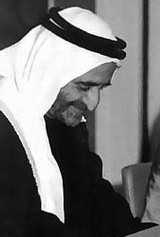
Sheikh Rashid bin Saeed

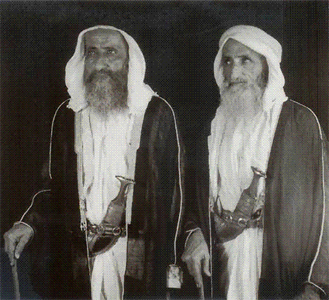
Sheikh Saeed bin Maktoum with his brother Sheikh Juma

== Members of Al Falasi ==
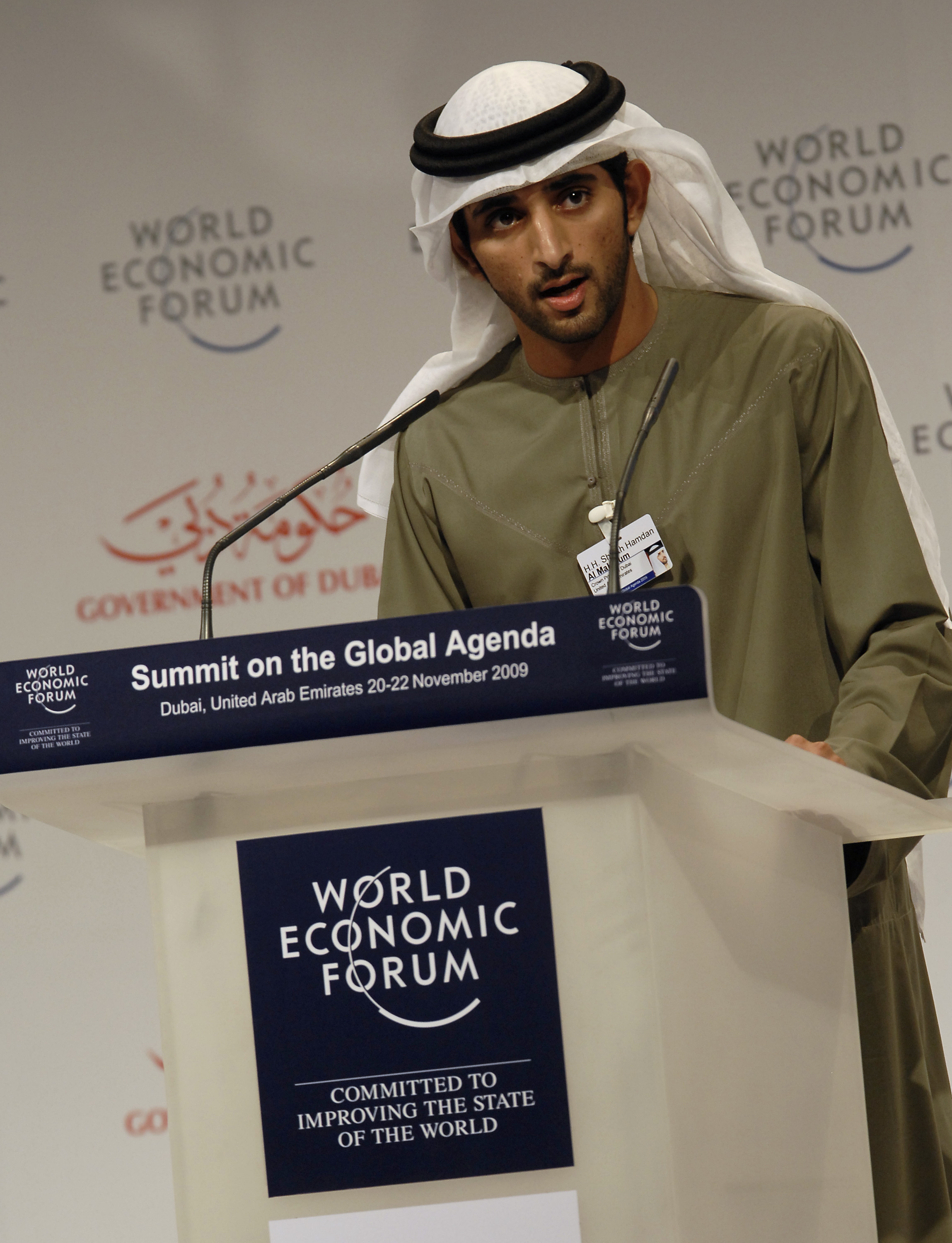
Crown Prince of Dubai, Sheikh Hamdan

- Mohammed bin Rashid Al Maktoum - Ruler of Dubai and leader of the tribe
- Hind bint Maktoum bin Juma Al Maktoum
- Hamdan bin Mohammed Al Maktoum - Crown Prince of Dubai
- Haya bint Hussein (by marriage) - Princess of Jordan
- Rashid bin Mohammed Al Maktoum - (1981-2015) (Previous Crown Prince - title was removed)
- Maktoum bin Mohammed Al Maktoum - Deputy Ruler of Dubai
- Saeed bin Butti - Ruler of Dubai (1852-1859)
- Hasher bin Maktoum- Ruler of Dubai (1859-1886)
- Rashid bin Maktoum - Ruler of Dubai (1886-1894)
- Rashid bin Saeed Al Maktoum - Ruler of Dubai (1958-1990)
- Maktoum bin Rashid Al Maktoum - Ruler of Dubai, and Vice President of the UAE (1990-2006)
- Butti bin Suhail Al Maktoum - Ruler of Dubai (1906-1912)
- Saeed bin Maktoum bin Hasher Al Maktoum - Ruler of Dubai (1912-1958)
- Maktoum bin Butti bin Suhail - Ruler of Dubai (1833-1852)
- Ahmed bin Saeed Al Maktoum - president of the Department of Civil Aviation, CEO and chairman of The Emirates Group and Chairman of Dubai World
- Lahej Saif Saeed Al Falasi - Chairman of Academy of Technical Training
- Ahmed bin Rashid Al Maktoum - Major General
- Ahmad Belhoul Al Falasi - Minister of State for Entrepreneurship and SMEs
- Sultan bin Ahmed bin Sulayem - XChairman, Dubai World
- Mohammad Ali Bin Zayed Al Falasi - Deputy Governor of the UAE Central Bank
- Abdulla Ali Bin Zayed Al Falasi - Director General of Dubai Government Human Resources Department
- Maitha bint Mohammed Al Maktoum - Olympic Athlete in Karate and Taekwondo
- Manal bint Mohammed Al Maktoum - Emirati politician
- Latifa bint Mohammed Al Maktoum (II)
- Majid bin Mohammed Al Maktoum - Philanthropist
- Mohammad bin Abdallah Al Gaz - Former Chairman of the UAE Central Bank (1930-2016)
- Jamal Mohammed Al Hai - Executive Senior Vice President of Dubai International Airport, UAE parliament member.
- Saeed bin Maktoum bin Rashid Al Maktoum - Olympic Athlete
- Mahra bint Mohammed Al Maktoum
- Mohamed Albuflasa - Bahraini poet, writer, former independent candidate for the Bahraini Parliament in the 2010 Parliamentary elections and a member of the Bahraini youth parliament

== Coat of arms ==
The coats of arms of the House of Al Falasi is simply described as إمارة دبي, i.e., Emirate of Dubai which is represented by a Falcon (The National bird of the UAE).
