= Al Bu Hamir =

Bedouin tribe of the United Arab Emirates

- Arab tribe
- Ethnicity: Arab
- Location: United Arab Emirates
- Language: Arabic
- Religion: Maliki Sunni

The Al Bu Hamir (Arabic: آل بو حمير) (singular Arabic: الحميري Al-Hamiri, also spelled Al-Humairi or Al-Hemeiri) is a tribe in the United Arab Emirates (UAE). Originating in Al Ain Region of the emirate of Abu Dhabi, they are a small section of the Bani Yas tribal confederation. Under the Bani Yas, they were considered a subsection of the Manasir. They were Maliki Sunni in religion and partisans of the Hinawi faction in politics and, around the turn of the 20th century, comprised some 60 houses in Abu Dhabi, where they appear to have settled. The members of the tribe have usually enjoyed close relationships with the Al Nahyan ruling family. Several of its members held important positions in Sheikh Zayed Bin Sultan Al Nahyan's administration and Royal court.
