= Mohamed Albuflasa =

Bahraini poet, writer, former independent candidate for Parliament

Mohamed Yousif Rashid Albuflasa (Arabic: محمد يوسف راشد البوفلاسة; born 1 January 1977) is a Bahraini poet, writer, former independent candidate for the Bahraini Parliament in the 2010 Parliamentary elections and a member of the Bahraini youth parliament. He belongs to the Albuflasa Bedouin clan. Formerly a Bahrain Defence Force officer, he is now employed at the court of Crown Prince Salman bin Hamad bin Isa Al Khalifa.

As a result of a speech he made to the Pearl Roundabout protests, Albuflasa became the first political prisoner in the Bahraini uprising. Albuflasa's speech was significant as a Salafi addressing protesters who were mostly Shia or Sunni Muslims.

== 2010 Parliamentary Elections ==
During the October 2010 Bahraini parliamentary election, Albuflasa stood as an independent candidate calling for change. He publicly criticised the Bahraini parliament's neglect of its role as a monitoring and legislative body in favour of political conflicts between different political parties.

He subsequently withdrew in favor of the Al-Menbar Islamic Society's candidate, now MP, Mohamed Al-Emadi, saying that he considered Al-Emadi likely to make a better MP. Although military personnel are not allowed to stand for election, Albuflasa has not been subjected to disciplinary action as a result.

== Involvement in the Bahraini uprising ==
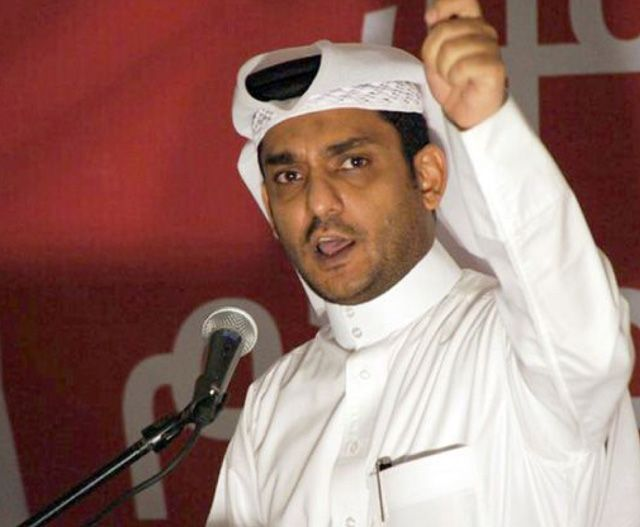
Mohamed Albuflasa giving a speech during the 2010 Bahraini parliamentary elections campaign

=== Speech ===
External videos
- Mohamed Albuflasa speech in Pearl Roundabout on 15 February on YouTube

On 15 February, the second day of Bahrain Arab Spring protests, Albuflasa addressed the crowd of protestors assembled at Pearl Roundabout. In what was described as a balanced speech Albuflasa, wearing a traditional Arab thawb, pointed to the need for genuine political reform and expressed support for protestors' demands including calls for an end to sectarian discrimination against the Shia majority and the "political naturalization of Sunnis". He made no mention of being a retired military officer.

=== Significance ===
Albuflasa's speech was noteworthy because he is a religiously conservative Sunni while the protesters were mostly Shia or secular Sunnis. According to his brother Rashed, Mohamed's speech was intended to calm the flames of anger caused by efforts to create disagreement between Shiites and Sunnis. He wanted to show there was no difference between them and that both were Bahraini. While the government was surprised and regarded the speech as an attack on them, for which Mohamed was paying the consequences, he was not against the royal family and government.

=== Arrest and detention ===
After leaving the assembly that evening, Albuflasa disappeared. Three weeks later, the government acknowledged that he had been arrested by security forces, was in custody, and would stand trial for "breaching the Bahrain Defense Force law."

Albuflasa alleged that he was mistreated while in detention. He was reportedly subjected to humiliation, deprived of sunlight and adequate ventilation, and refused the health care he requested for his depression. On Albuflasa's blog, his family described his solitary confinement in a cell 1 meter by 1 meter and signs of exhaustion as a result of torture and a hunger strike.

=== Trial and sentence ===
Albuflasa was tried, without legal representation or any access to witnesses, by a military court on his own in secret on 27 February. In mid-March, he was sentenced to a two-month prison term.

Although he had completed his sentence by 15 April, Albuflasa's detention was extended for 45 days by a military prosecutor. On 1 June, Albuflasa began a hunger strike in protest against his continued detention without charge.

=== Local and international responses ===
- Parliament of Bahrain: On 22 February, the lower Chamber of the Bahrain parliament passed an emergency motion calling on the government to release Albuflasa. Four MPs urged his inclusion in a proposed royal pardon for all political prisoners and dissidents.
- Local political parties: On 23 February, the six local political parties Al Wefaq, Islamic Action Society, National Democratic Action Society, Nationalist Democratic Rally Society, Progressive Democratic Tribune and Al-Ekha National Society called for Albuflasa's immediate release and welcomed his "national stand".

On 28 February, former Al Wefaq MP Hussain Jassim called for Albuflasa's immediate release, declaring that it was unacceptable for any citizen, civilian or military, to be arrested for expressing his political opinion. "Keeping Albuflasa in jail damaged Bahrain's reputation," Jassim said.

- Bahrain Centre for Human Rights expressed concern for Albuflasa's safety, demanded his immediate release as a political prisoner and prisoner of conscience and called for family visits to be allowed particularly in view of his attempted suicide. His torture allegations should be investigated and compensation granted for the psychological and physical abuse he had received.
- Human Rights Watch called on the Bahrain Defense Force to make the reason for Mohamed Albuflasa's detention public immediately. Joe Stork, deputy Middle East director at HRW suggested that the Bahraini authorities' "long silence" about Albuflasa's whereabouts and their failure to explain his detention might be due solely to their dislike of what he had said at the Pearl Roundabout.
- Amnesty International expressed concern that the only reason for Mohamed Albuflasa's continuing detention was due for having voiced political concerns in public, making him a prisoner of conscience. Hassiba Hadj Sahraoui, AI's Deputy Director for the Middle East and North Africa, called on the Bahraini authorities either to release Mohamed Albuflasa or to give their reasons for holding him and charge him with a recognizable offence. Sahraoui accused the authorities of having jailed Albuflasa merely for expressing political concerns in public and refusing to release him as retaliation aimed at silencing his criticism.”

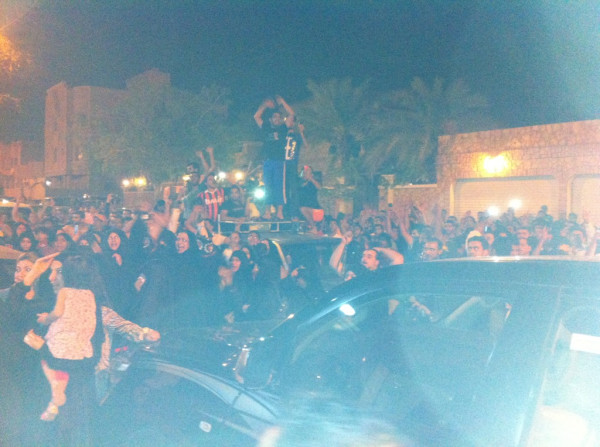
Hundreds of people welcoming Mohamed Albuflasa after being released nearby his house in Hamad town on 24 July 2011

=== Release ===
Mohamed Albuflasa was released on July 24. Greeted by a crowd of hundreds of Sunna and Shia chanting "Brothers Sunna and Shia" on his return home, he gave a brief speech warning against the threat to prospects of political reform posed by sectarianism and reminded Sunna and Shia of their common demands. The crowd was dispersed by riot police using tear gas.

=== Role in reducing sectarian conflicts ===
Mohamed Albuflasa played an important role in reducing sectarian conflict as a Bahraini Salafist Sunni supporting the mainly Shia-led calls for political reform and advocating equality and unity between Shia and Sunna. Nabeel Rajab, the president of Bahrain Centre for Human Rights described him as a symbol for unity and tolerance.

== See also ==
- Bahraini uprising (2011–present)
- Politics of Bahrain
