= As-Suwaidi =

As-Suwaidi (as-Suwaydi, al-Suwaidi, etc.; السويدي) is an Arabic nisbat derived from suwayd (an Arabic name derived from a root s-w-d "black", or from the Arabic name of Sweden).

== People ==
- As-Suwaydi (physician), a medieval physician (d. 1292)
- Muhammad Sa'id al-Suwaidi (1728 – 1808), Iraqi Muslim polymath
- Tawfiq al-Suwaidi (1892 – 1968), Iraqi politician
- Naji al-Suwaidi (1882 – 1942), Iraqi politician
- Khalid Habash al-Suwaidi (born 1984), a Qatari athlete
- a nisba referencing the Syrian as-Suwayda Governorate
- a nisba meaning "from Sweden" used as nom de guerre (kunya) by a number of Islamic terrorists from or based in Sweden, see Islam in Sweden

== Places ==
- As-Suwaidi (Riyadh), a district of Riyadh Province, Saudi Arabia.
- Bayt As Suwaydi, Yemen

== See also ==
- Suwayd (disambiguation)
