= Qubaisi =

Al Qubaisi
- Arab tribe
- Ethnicity: Arab
- Location: United Arab Emirates
- Language: Arabic
- Religion: Sunni Islam

Al Qubaisi (Al Qubaisiat) (Arabic: القبيسي (القبيسات)) are a sub-tribe of Bani Yas, of Abu Dhabi, closely associated with the Bani Yas of Abu Dhabi. The Al Qubaisi family share close relations with the leading royal family of the United Arab Emirates through Salama bint Butti Al Qubaisi mother of Sheikh Zayed bin Sultan Al Nahyan the founder of the UAE.

The Al Qubaisi family is part of the Bani Yas tribe, one of the largest and most influential tribes in the United Arab Emirates (UAE). The Bani Yas tribe historically held significant importance in the region, particularly in the formation and development of what is now the UAE. The Bani Yas tribe played a crucial role in the establishment of Abu Dhabi as a prominent emirate. They are known for their leadership, influence, and contributions to the history and culture of the region. Many of the ruling families in the UAE, including the Al Nahyan ruling family of Abu Dhabi, are part of the Bani Yas tribe.

As a subset of the Bani Yas tribe, the Al Qubaisi family has been influential in various aspects of Emirati society, including politics, business, and community affairs. They have played roles in the development and progress of the UAE, contributing to various sectors and institutions within the country. The connection to the Bani Yas tribe is significant in the context of Emirati culture and heritage, as tribal affiliations historically held importance in the social structure and governance of the region.
