= Academy of Technical Training =

Aviation training institution in Dubai

- أكاديمية التدريب الفني
- Type: Private academy
- Established: 2004
- Chairman: Lahej Saif Saeed Al Falasi
- Location: Dubai, United Arab Emirates
- Website: www.attdubai.com

The Academy of Technical Training (Arabic: أكاديمية التدريب الفني) is a privately owned institution which provides training programs in aviation security and safety, air traffic control, and management of aircraft accidents. The curriculum and courses are accredited and certified by the General Civil Aviation Authority.

== Profile ==
The academy provides professional training for military and civilian students, ranging from basic to advanced as well as recurrent levels. All courses are taught in accordance with international quality standards. The academy was founded in 2004. By the end of 2011, it had trained 4800 students.

The academy is located in Dubai Knowledge Village. Students that complete each course and reach a satisfactory standard are awarded a certificate of completion that also indicates their level of achievement.

All courses are taught in English but the academy has the ability to instruct courses in Arabic, if required.
