= Sudan (tribe) =

Bedouin tribe of the United Arab Emirates

Sudan Arabic: السودان
- Qahtanite Arab tribe
- Ethnicity: Arab
- Nisba: al-Suwaidi
- Location: Arabian Peninsula; United Arab Emirates
- Language: Arabic
- Religion: Islam

The Sudan (Arabic: السودان) (singular Al Suwaidi Arabic: السويدي) is an Arab tribe of in the United Arab Emirates (UAE), Qatar and other Gulf states, traditionally close associates of the Bani Yas of Abu Dhabi.

At the turn of the 20th century settled Sudan numbered some 405 houses in Abu Dhabi and Batin, 250 houses in Dubai, 300 in Sharjah and 12 in Ajman. The family also settled the islands of the Persian Gulf, with some 20 houses on Abu Musa and 40 families living on Sirri Island. Some 5,000 strong, the tribe was mostly settled in the coastal areas of the Trucial States. The Sudan mostly subsisted on fishing and pearling and did not own date gardens in the inland oases.

== Association with Bani Yas ==
The tribe was embroiled in conflict in 1824, when members of a dissident faction of Sudan in Sharjah built a tower in Deira, then a part of Sharjah, encouraged by Tahnun bin Shakhbut Al Nahyan. Tahnun was himself jostling with Sultan bin Saqr Al Qasimi for control over Buraimi and Sultan had built two towers there. An attempt to arbitrate in the dispute by the British Residency agent in 1824 failed when Sultan sent a force against the Deira fort, expelling the Sudan. The move led to the failure of either Abu Dhabi or Sharjah to send boats to the pearling in 1825, a grave economic shock to both.

However, in 1829, the area of Deira, on the opposite side to the creek to Dubai, was settled by some 400 Sudan who had left Sharjah in 1826 following an argument with the ruler, Sheikh Sultan bin Saqr Al Qasimi.

Sheikh Zayed bin Khalifa Al Nahyan's mother was a Suwaidi. He married the daughter of the Sheikh of the Sudan, Sultan bin Nasir Al Suwaidi. It was with the Sudan that Zayed conceived the idea of establishing a fort at Al Zorah in Ajman in 1895, to consolidate and build a bridgehead into the northern emirates. In 1897, a section of the Sudan under Sultan bin Nasser requested permission to settle Al Zorah with the support of Zayed, which was granted by the British Resident.

Alarmed by the scheme, the Ruler of Ajman built a fort at one of the waterways connecting Al Zorah with the mainland (it an island at the time). In 1890 and the Ruler of Sharjah, Sheikh Saqr bin Khalid Al Qasimi appealed to the Resident to prevent the establishment of a non-Al Qasimi stronghold in the midst of his territory. This being upheld, to the annoyance of Zayed who had seen Al Zorah as an extension of his claim to the northern coast, the scheme was abandoned and the decision to block it was subsequently upheld after a visit to Al Zorah by Major Percy Cox, the British Political Resident.

In 1927, the Marar and Sudan tribes in Sharjah were in conflict, the Marar having left Dubai in 1891 to settle in the outlying Sharjah town (now a suburb of the city) of Layyah. In January 1927, 150 members of the Marar tribe left to settle in Deira where the area of Marar still bears their name. The support of both the Marar and Sudan of Deira would be crucial to Sheikh Saeed Al Maktoum during the settlement of the Majlis affair of 1939.

The Sudan often played a key role in Abu Dhabi political affairs, with Sheikh Ahmad bin Khalifah Al Suwaidi in 1928 leading the opposition to Shakhbut bin Sultan as ruler, when this was proposed to the family and leading notables, supporting Hazza bin Sultan instead.

== The Sudan in Qatar ==
Members of the Sudan from Abu Dhabi settled Bida’a on Qatar's eastern coast in 1766. In 1801 the British representative in Muscat, David Seton, suspected the tribe of being involved in piracy and sailed with the Sultan of Muscat in order to bombard Bida’a, but the waters were too shallow to allow his gunboat to come within range.

In February 1841, after the Sudan were suspected of harbouring the pirate Jasim bin Jabir (known as Raqraqi) in Bida'a, a British squadron arrived to punish the headman, Salimayn bin Nasir al-Suwaidi. Upon the British firing a few shots at the town, Salimayn paid a fine in cash and jewellery, and handed over Raqraqi's ship, which was set on fire. In May 1843 Isa bin Tarif, head of the Al Bin Ali tribe and former sheikh of Huwailah, moved to Bida'a and forced the near-bankrupt Sudan to leave Bida'a and settle in Lingah.

== See also ==
- As-Suwaidi (disambiguation)
