= Bani Yas =

Bedouin tribe of the United Arab Emirates

The Bani Yas (Arabic: بَنُو ياس) Singular Al Yasi (Arabic: الياسي) is a tribal confederation of Najdi origin in the United Arab Emirates. The tribal confederation, consisting of around 20 tribes from Abu Dhabi, to Dubai to Khor Al Adaid in southeast Qatar, was called the Bani Yas Coalition (Arabic: حلف قبيلة بني ياس). The Al Nahyan, a branch of the Al Bu Falah, leads the tribe and is the ruling family of Abu Dhabi. The Al Maktoum, a branch of the Al Bu Falasah, is also a member and is the ruling family of Dubai. Al Nahyan and Al Maktoum are the most influential in the UAE federal government. The ruler of Abu Dhabi is customarily elected as the president of the UAE, and the ruler of Dubai is traditionally elected as the vice president and prime minister of the UAE.

== Abu Dhabi ==
The Emirate of Abu Dhabi largely corresponds, as it did in the early twentieth century, to the traditional territory of the Bani Yas tribe. According to J. C. Lorimer's Gazetteer of the Persian Gulf, Oman and Central Arabia (1908–1915), the total population of the Trucial Coast at that time was estimated at 80,000, comprising about 72,000 settled inhabitants and 8,000 Bedouin. Although the Gazetteer is frequently cited, it is not regarded as an infallible source; rather, it represents the most comprehensive body of information available to the British Government of India during the first decade of the twentieth century. Its data are best understood as indicative of relative proportions and social structures rather than as precise statistical measurements.

Among the indigenous tribal population of what is now the United Arab Emirates, the Bani Yas constituted the largest single tribe, although their numbers declined steadily over the course of the twentieth century. Lorimer estimated their population at around 12,000, including approximately 2,000 nomadic members who generally remained within Abu Dhabi territory throughout the year. Of the roughly 10,000 settled Bani Yas, about half resided in the Liwa Oasis, 2,800 lived in Abu Dhabi town, around 2,000 in Dubai, and the remainder were distributed among the Buraimi Oasis, offshore islands, and smaller coastal and inland settlements.

By the early 1950s, the Bani Yas population on the Trucial Coast had fallen to approximately 8,000, including about 1,700 Bedouin. The first population census conducted in Abu Dhabi in 1968 recorded 5,884 members of the Bani Yas within the shaikhdom, of whom 1,287 belonged to the Mazari subsection; the remaining 4,597 were classified under other branches of the tribe. This decline was largely attributed to emigration during the late 1950s, when many families moved to Qatar, Kuwait, and Saudi Arabia in search of employment, particularly in the oil and construction sectors. As oil exploration in Abu Dhabi became increasingly mechanized, local labour demand declined. Large-scale return migration occurred only after the emirate's development accelerated following the accession of Sheikh Zayed bin Sultan Al Nahyan. Subsequent censuses conducted in 1971 and 1975–1976 did not record tribal affiliation.

As a tribal confederation, the Bani Yas have been described inconsistently by different observers with regard to both the number of constituent sections and the inclusion of allied tribes. In 1907, J. C. Lorimer identified 15 sections within the confederation, while J. B. Kelly later distinguished 14 major and 6 minor sections. Variations in these accounts reflect shifting political relationships, as associated tribes at times sought full integration into the Bani Yas under the authority of the Ruler of Abu Dhabi, while changing regional power dynamics on other occasions encouraged assertions of autonomy.

Contemporary leading members of the Bani Yas in Abu Dhabi identify more than 20 sections as forming part of the confederation. Nineteenth- and early twentieth-century sources list differing components and, in some cases, note distinct tribal origins prior to incorporation. For example, the Hawamil were reported to have been part of the Al Ali, while the Maharibah were considered to have originated from the Na'im.

Several sections recorded by Lorimer were not subsequently mentioned by Kelly or in the United Kingdom Memorial on the Buraimi dispute, including the Al Falah, Al Bu Hamir, Qanaisat, Qasal, Bani Shikir, and Al Sultan. Conversely, some groups, such as the Marar, Rawashid, and Sudan, were listed separately by Lorimer, while the Nuwasir appeared only in the UK Memorial. Other groups identified by Lorimer as distinct—namely the Al Bu Amim, Dahailat, Halalmah, and Thamairat—were already in the process of integration and are now generally regarded as minor subsections of the Bani Yas. The Bedouin group referred to as the Jabais in the UK Memorial is generally identified with the Sabais.

== History ==
The Bani Yas tribe originated in the Najd region of Central Arabia, descending, along with the Awamir, from Yas ibn Amer ibn Sa'sa'a. The House of Al Bu Falah, which held the most power in the confederation at the time, settled with the Bani Yas clans together in the Liwa oasis, around 1700 in present-day Abu Dhabi. The Bani Yas also later settled in and around Al Ain and Buraimi when the Al Bu Falah (Al Falahi) clan acquired property and land in the Buraimi Oasis.

In 1793, the Al Bu Falah migrated to the island of Abu Dhabi due to the discovery of fresh water, in 1795, the Al Bu Falah settle on the island and establish the town of Abu Dhabi, which throughout the years grew in trade and influence and quickly became prominent and was established as the seat of the Emirate of Abu Dhabi with the construction of Qasr al-Hosn.

The Bani Yas had close relations with the Dhawahir tribe, which was traditionally at odds with the Na'im and the Bani Ka’ab in Buraimi Oasis.

In 1822, the House of Al Maktoum took over Dubai, a coastal trade city and established themselves as their own Emirate of Dubai.

In 1835, members of the Bani Yas settled Khor Al Adaid in southeastern Qatar.

== Branches ==
The Bani Yas confederation consisted, at one time or another, of a number of branches, which are:

1. Al Falahi/Al Bu Falah (آل بو فلاح/الفلاحي) of which the House of Al Nahyan is a subsection of.
2. Al Falasi/Al Bu Falasah (آل بو فلاسة/الفلاسي) of which the House of Al Maktoum is a subsection of.
3. Al Qubaisi/Qubaisat (القبيسات/القبيسي)
4. Al Qemzi/Qumzan (القمزان/القمزي)
5. Al Hemairi/Al Bu Hemair (آل بو حمير/الحميري)
6. Al Mehairbi/Maharibah (المحاربة/المحيربي)
7. Al Remeithi/Rumaithat (الرميثات/الرميثي)
8. Al Mashghouni/Mishagin (المشاغين/المشغوني)
9. Al Hameli/Hawamil (الهوامل/الهاملي)
10. Al Mehairi/Al Bu Muhair (آل بو مهير/المهيري)
11. Al Suwaidi/Sudan (السودان/السويدي)
12. Al Mazrouei/Mazari (المزاريع/المزروعي)
13. Al Subousi/Sabais (السبايس/السبوسي)
14. Al Marri/Marar (المرر/المري)
15. Al Halami/Halalmah (الحلالمة/الحلامي)

== See also ==
- Royal families of the United Arab Emirates
- Banu Amir
- Hawazin
