= Emirate of Dubai =

Emirate, one of the constituents of the United Arab Emirates

Emirate of Dubai إمارة دبيّ ʾImārat Dubayy
- Emirate
- Flag Coat of arms

- Interactive map of Emirate of Dubai
- Coordinates: 24.9°N 55.4°E
- Country: United Arab Emirates
- Independence from the UK: 2 December 1971
- Seat: Dubai
- Subdivisions: 9 numbered sectors or districts: Bur Dubai; Deira; Jumeirah; Jebel Ali; Al Awir; Ras Al Khor; Mushraif; Al Qudra; Hatta

Government
  - Type: Islamic absolute monarchy within a federation
  - Ruler: Mohammed bin Rashid Al Maktoum
  - Crown Prince: Hamdan bin Mohammed Al Maktoum

Area
  - Total: 4,114 km^{2} (1,588 sq mi)
  - Rank: 2nd

Population (2021)
  - Total: 3,478,300
  - Rank: 2nd
  - Density: 1,015/km^{2} (2,630/sq mi)
- Demonym: Dubaian

GDP
  - Total: US$ 138.1 billion (2023)
  - Per capita: US$ 44,600 (2023)
- Time zone: UTC+4 (UAE standard time)
  - Summer (DST): UTC+4
- ISO 3166 code: AE-DU
- Religion: Islam (the official state religion of the UAE)

The Emirate of Dubai (Note: Arabic: إمارة دبيّ, romanized: ʾImārat Dubayy) is one of the seven emirates of the United Arab Emirates. It is the most populous emirate of the UAE. The capital of the emirate is the eponymous city, Dubai.

== Governance ==
Dubai is governed as an absolute monarchy by the Al Maktoum family, who have ruled since 1833. It operates within the federal structure of the UAE, with the Ruler of Dubai also serving as the Vice President and Prime Minister of the UAE.

== Geography ==
The city of Dubai is located on the coast of the Persian Gulf, while the Emirate stretches inland and is bordered to the south by the emirate of Abu Dhabi and to the northeast by the emirate of Sharjah. The emirate also includes the exclave Hatta further east in the Hajar Mountains. Hatta borders Oman to the east and the south, the Ajman exclave of Masfout to the west, and the emirate of Ras Al Khaimah to the north.

== Subdivisions ==
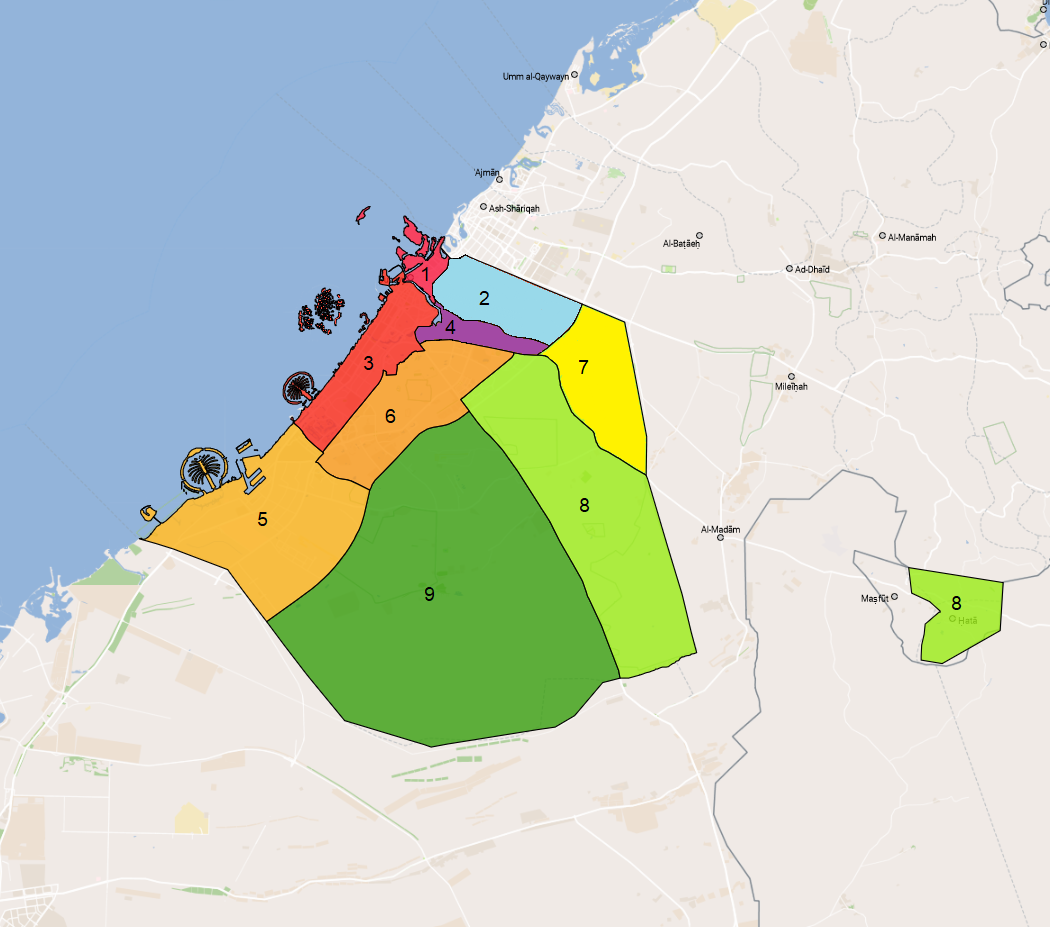
Sectors of Dubai

The emirate and the coterminous city is subdivided into nine numbered sectors.

Dubai is divided into 9 sectors of which 1 to 6 are urban and 7 to 9 are rural. In numbers of 2007: 1.511.423 urban, 18.369 rural, 1.529.792 total. The sectors are subdivided into 224 communities. In other sources, the sectors and communities are called districts and subdistricts. The exclave of Hatta is a community in Sector 8.

== History ==
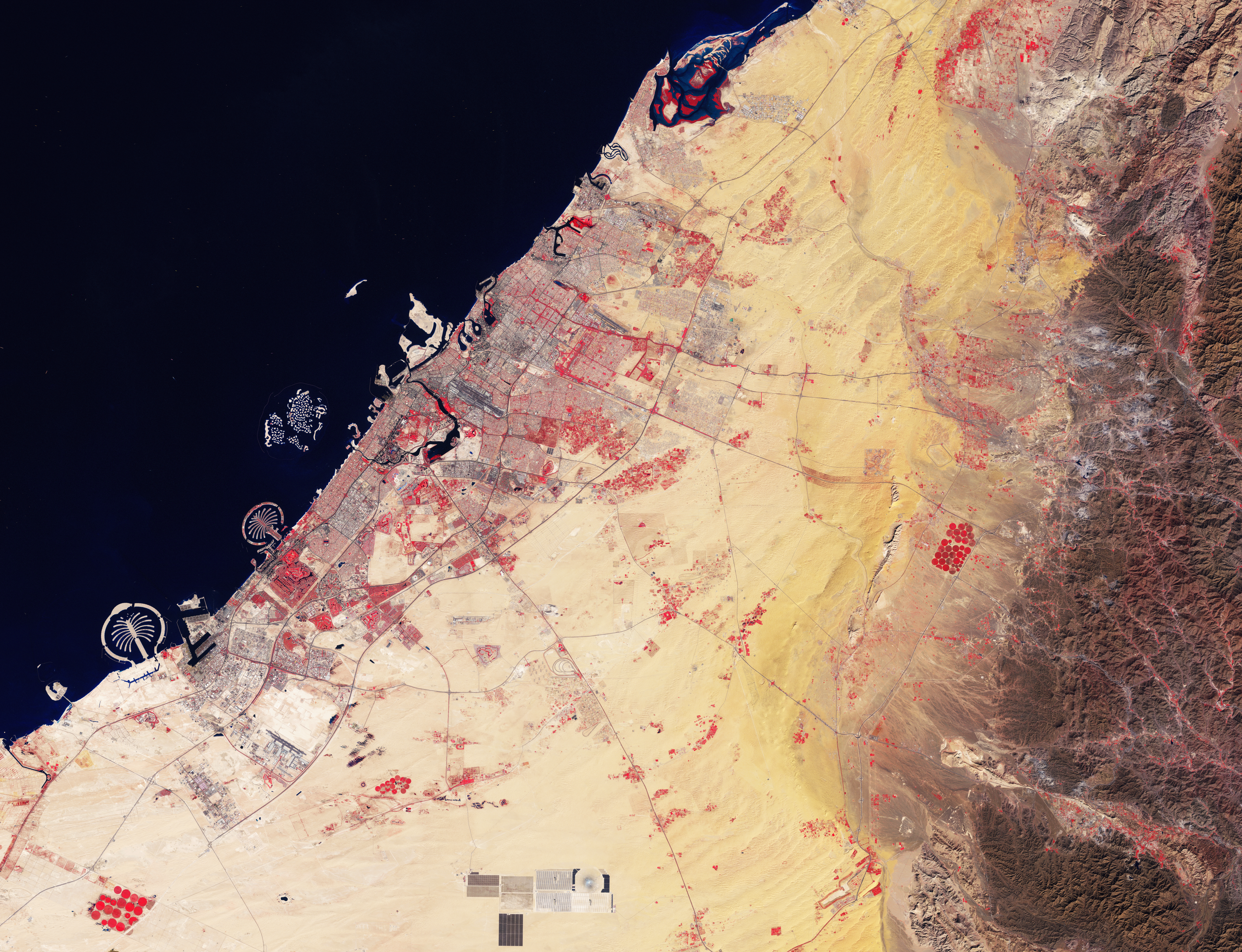
Dubai by Copernicus Sentinel-2 satellite in false-colour in 2024

In the early 19th century, the coastal township of Dubai was located within the territorial lands of the Bani Yas tribe, however Dubai was also on the borderlands near the control of the powerful Al Qasimi clan. This caused both groups to assert authority over the town.

In the 19th century, pearls were the main commodity of the region, with buyers from Mumbai, commerce peaked in 1897.

In 1901, Maktoum bin Hasher Al Maktoum established Dubai as a free port with no taxation on imports or exports and also gave merchants parcels of land and guarantees of protection and tolerance. These policies saw a movement of merchants not only directly from Lingeh, but also those who had settled in Ras Al Khaimah and Sharjah (which had historical links with Lingeh through the Al Qawasim tribe) to Dubai. An indicator of the growing importance of Dubai can be gained from the movements of the steamer of the Bombay and Persia Steam Navigation Company, which from 1899 to 1901 paid five visits annually to Dubai. In 1902, the company's vessels made 21 visits to Dubai and from 1904 on, the steamers called fortnightly – in 1906, trading 70,000 tonnes of cargo. The frequency of these vessels helped to accelerate Dubai's role as an emerging port and trading hub of preference. British historian John Lorimer noted the transfer of merchants from Lingeh "bids fair to become complete and permanent", and also that the town had by 1906 supplanted Lingeh as the chief entrepôt of the Trucial States. By 1908, Dubai was home to a population of some 10,000 people.

By the 1930s and 1940s, the pearl business crashed due to cultured pearls from Japan. The economy crashed which triggered a famine. Hopes were reignited when in 1937, an oil exploration contract was signed which guaranteed royalty rights for Dubai and concessionary payments to Sheikh Saeed bin Maktoum. However, due to World War II, oil would not be struck until 1966 at the Fateh oil field.

In December 1971, the emirates united to form the United Arab Emirates, thus ending their status as British protectorates.

The ruler of the emirate is Sheikh Mohammed bin Rashid Al Maktoum. The emirate is made up of various other communities. The inland exclave of Hatta is located about 134 km east of the city of Dubai. The exclave is bordered by Oman to the east and south, the villages of Sayh Mudayrah and Masfout in Ajman to the west, and Ras Al Khaimah to the north.

== Rulers ==
- 9 July 1833 – 1836: Sheikh Obeid bin Said bin Rashid (d. 1836)
- 9 July 1836 – 1852: Sheikh Maktoum bin Butti bin Suhail (d. 1852)
- 1852 – 1859: Sheikh Saeed bin Butti (d. 1859)
- 1859 – 22 November 1886: Sheikh Hasher bin Maktoum (d. 1886)
- 22 November 1886 – 7 April 1894: Sheikh Rashid bin Maktoum (d. 1894)
- 7 April 1894 – 16 February 1906: Sheikh Maktoum bin Hasher Al Maktoum (d. 1906)
- 16 February 1906 – November 1912: Sheikh Butti bin Suhail Al Maktoum (d. 1912)
- November 1912 – September 1958: Sheikh Saeed bin Maktoum bin Hasher Al Maktoum (d. 1958)
- September 1958 – 7 October 1990: Sheikh Rashid bin Saeed Al Maktoum (d. 1990)
- 7 October 1990 – 4 January 2006: Sheikh Maktoum bin Rashid Al Maktoum (d. 2006)
- 4 January 2006: Sheikh Mohammed bin Rashid Al Maktoum (b. 1949)

== Law enforcement and crime ==
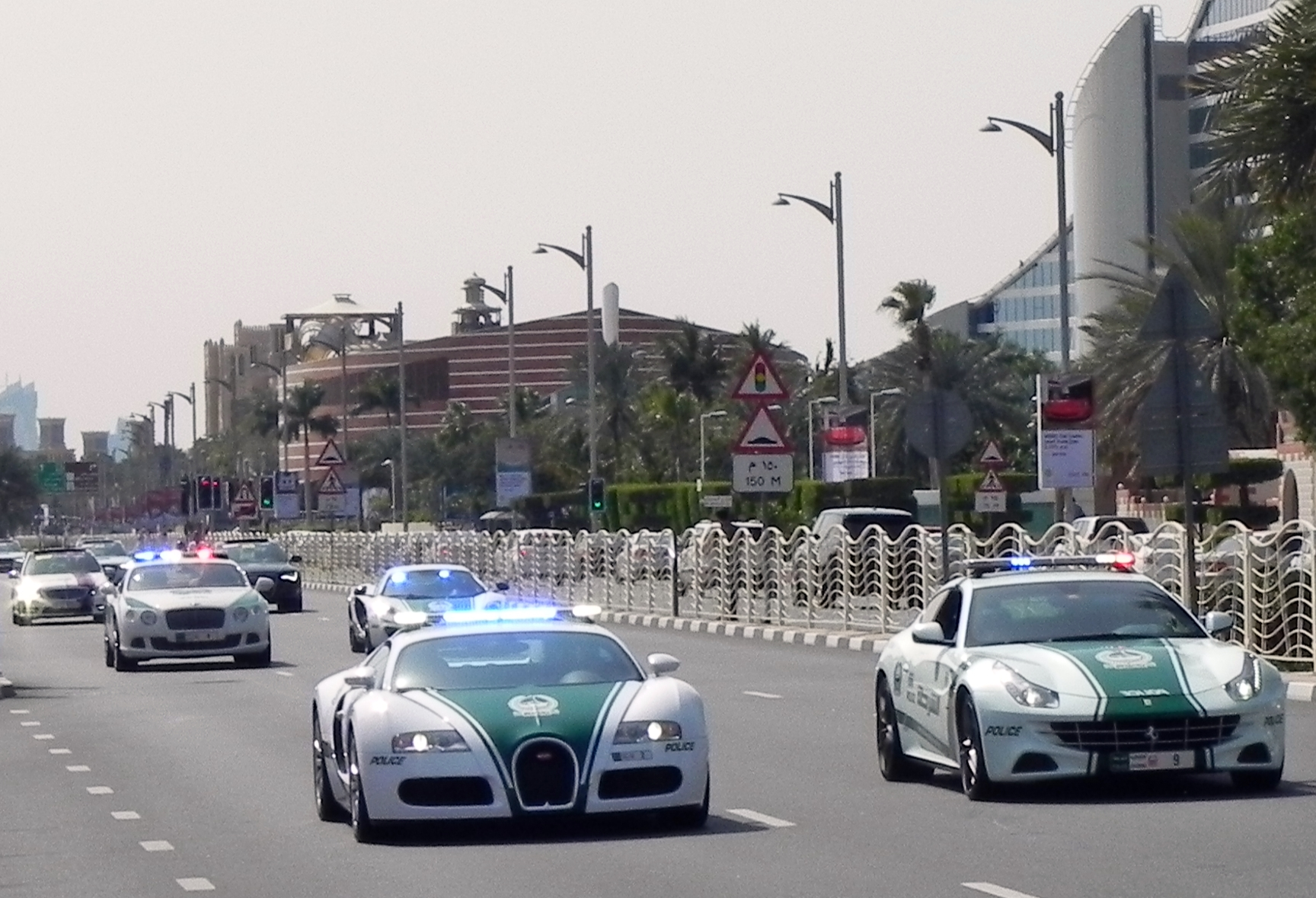
Dubai Police operates a fleet of exotic cars in addition to the standard vehicles.

The Dubai Police Force, founded in 1956 in the Naif area, has law-enforcement jurisdiction over the emirate. The force is under the direct command of Mohammed bin Rashid al Maktoum. Dubai and Ras al Khaimah are the only emirates that do not conform to the federal judicial system of the United Arab Emirates. The emirate's judicial courts comprise the Court of First Instance, the Court of Appeal, and the Court of Cassation. The Court of First Instance consists of the Civil Court, which hears all civil claims; the Criminal Court, which hears claims originating from police complaints; and the Sharia Court, which is responsible for matters between Muslims. Non-Muslims do not appear before the Sharia Court. The Court of Cassation is the supreme court of the emirate and hears only disputes of law. Alcohol sale and consumption, though legal, is regulated. Adult non-Muslims are allowed to consume alcohol in licensed venues, typically within hotels or at home with the possession of an alcohol license. Places other than hotels, clubs, and specially designated areas generally are not permitted to sell alcohol. In 2024, Dubai authorities charged an Irish woman for consuming alcohol.

As in other parts of the world, drinking and driving is illegal, with 21 being the legal drinking age in the Emirate of Dubai.

=== International crime hub and criminal haven ===
Dubai is a global centre and sanctuary for money launderers, drug lords, corrupt political figures, and sanctioned business people. This includes money laundering by major crime syndicates.

A complex range of factors has enabled this state of affairs: the lack of extradition treaties with many countries, banking secrecy, liberal visa policies, low taxes, a large expatriate community in which shady figures are easily absorbed and welcomed, a non-transparent real estate market that readily enables money laundering, and not least, the monarchical dictatorship of the Maktoum family which facilitates it through deliberately lax legislation and policy.

Examples include Amit Gupta, who bribed Nauru politicians in an attempt to stage a coup that would give him control of that island's mining rights and Ahmed Al Hamza, a transnational crime figure and one of Melbourne's most powerful gangsters.

Dubai's Role in Facilitating Corruption and Global Illicit Financial Flows, a 2020 report by the Carnegie Endowment for International Peace, stated: "Part of what underpins Dubai's prosperity is a steady stream of illicit proceeds borne from corruption and crime...Meanwhile, both Emirati leaders and the international community continue to turn a blind eye to the problematic behaviours, administrative loopholes, and weak enforcement practices that make Dubai a globally attractive destination for dirty money."

Dubai is an investment base for the international drug trade by Balkan criminal groups, while Belgian criminals are notably active in its real estate market on behalf of Russian oligarchs and politicians, who seek to launder their ill-gotten gains. In 2022, a data leak obtained by the U.S. Center for Advanced Defense Studies (C4ADS) exposed some of this activity. Dubai is under observation by the Financial Action Task Force (FATF), which is likely to bring greater international scrutiny and pressure on its government.

Ireland's Kinahan Cartel had been operating from Dubai, which was becoming a haven for organised crime gangs. The founder of the cartel is Christy Kinahan, and his sons are Daniel and Christopher Kinahan. Although they are regular visitors to Dubai, their exact whereabouts remain unknown. The crime group maintains connections with powerful Emirati families and the regime. Using their Emirati partners, the Kinahan family has established multiple companies in the Emirates to trade in clothing, textiles, and food, along with management in aviation consultancies in free zones. With Dubai becoming a refuge for criminals, the Kinahan cartel held regular meetings with their criminal associates in the city. The US, UK, and Europol targeted the organised crime group and imposed sanctions on the Kinahan family and seven of their associates. On 11 October 2024, Interpol issued a red notice against a cartel member, Sean McGovern, who was arrested by Dubai police. The Kinahan cartel was planning an escape from the Emirates, in case of an extradition request from Ireland. The group had a detailed plan to move to Russia. On 21 October, an extradition treaty was signed between Ireland and the UAE.

=== Human rights ===
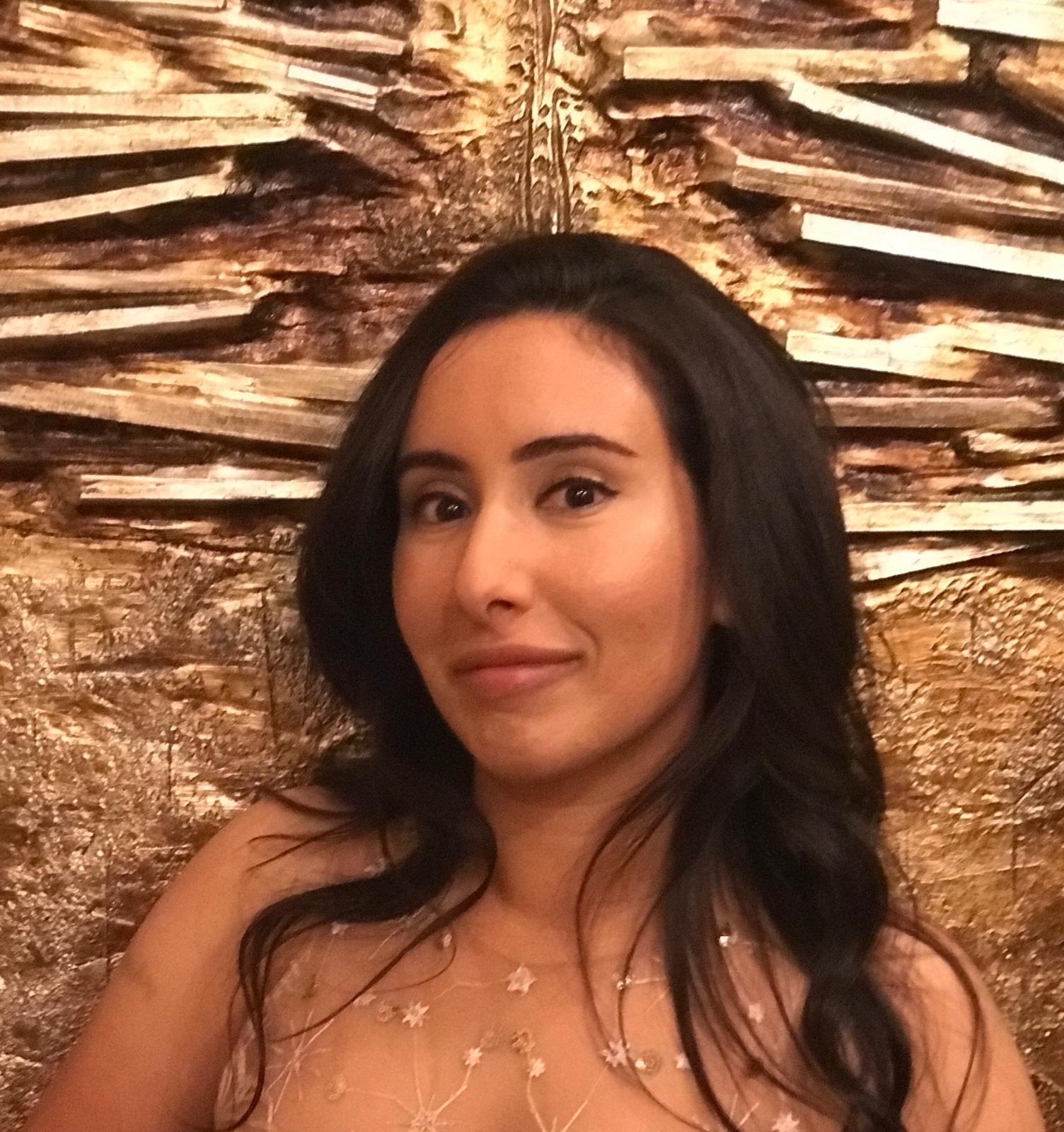
Latifa, daughter of Dubai's ruler, escaped Dubai in February 2018 but was captured in the Indian Ocean.

Companies in Dubai have been criticised in the past for human rights violations against labourers. Some of the 250,000 foreign labourers in the city have been alleged to live in conditions Human Rights Watch has called "less than humane". The mistreatment of foreign workers is a subject of the 2009 documentary Slaves in Dubai. The Dubai government has denied labour injustices and said that Human Rights Watch's accusations are "misguided". The filmmaker explained in interviews how it was necessary to go undercover to avoid discovery by the authorities, who impose high fines on reporters attempting to document human rights abuses, including the conditions of construction workers.

In March 2006, the government announced steps to allow construction unions. UAE labour minister Ali al-Kaabi said, "Labourers will be allowed to form unions." As of 2020, the federal public prosecution has clarified that "it is an offense when at least three public employees collectively leave work or one of the duties to achieve an unlawful purpose. Each employee will be punished with not less than 6 months in prison and not more than a year, as the imprisonment will be for leaving the job or duties that affect the health or the security of the people or affect other public services of public benefit." Any act of spreading discord among employees is punishable by imprisonment, and in all cases, foreigners will be deported.

Homosexual acts are illegal under UAE law. Freedom of speech in Dubai is limited, with both residents and citizens facing severe sanctions for criticizing the royal family or local laws and culture. Some of the labourers lured by the higher pay available in Dubai are victims of human trafficking or forced labour and some women are forced into the growing sex trade in Dubai, a centre of human trafficking and prostitution.

Defamation on social media is a punishable offence in Dubai with fines of up to half a million dirhams and a jail term of up to 2 years. In 2020, three Sri Lankan expats were fined 500,000 dirhams (US$136,000) each for posting defamatory Islamophobic Facebook posts.

A victim of domestic violence, Tori Towey faced abuse since getting married in March 2024. She lived in Dubai and was working as a flight attendant for the airline Emirates. When she first sought help in Dubai, Towey was mocked by an Emirati police officer. The authorities charged her with attempting suicide and illegal consumption of alcohol and banned her from leaving Dubai. Towey was assisted by Radha Sterling, who questioned Ireland's travel advice, claiming it is "insufficient" to help visitors, particularly women, understand how to approach officials in the UAE. Sterling said it is difficult to explain to foreign travellers how they can stay safe in the Emirates.

== Demographics ==
View source data.

The population of the Emirate of Dubai reached approximately 4.58 million at the end of 2025, an increase of about 332,000 people, or 7.5%, compared with the end of 2024. The figures were published by Digital Dubai through the Dubai Data and Statistics Establishment and are based on administrative records, digital systems and continuously updated population data. Dubai has a highly international population, reflecting migration associated with employment, business and other opportunities. Arabic is the official language of Dubai and the UAE, while English is widely used in business and public life. Islam is the official religion, and residents of other faiths practise their religions within the UAE's framework for religious coexistence.

== See also ==
- Outline of Dubai
- Emirates of the United Arab Emirates
