= Butti =

Butti is a male Arabic first and surname. Notable people with the name include:

== Surname ==
- Alessandro Butti (1893–1959), Italian designer
- Carlo Butti (1891–1971), Italian decathlete
- Dina Butti, Egyptian/Canadian TV presenter, writer, and artist
- Enrico Butti (1847–1932), Italian sculptor
- Maktoum bin Butti bin Sohal, 19th-century Emir of Dubai
- Saeed bin Butti, 19th-century Emir of Dubai

== First name ==
- Butti bin Suhail Al Maktoum (1850/1851–1912), 20th century Ruler of Dubai
