= Zabeel Palace =

Royal residence of the Al Maktoum family in Dubai

- قصر زعبيل (Arabic)
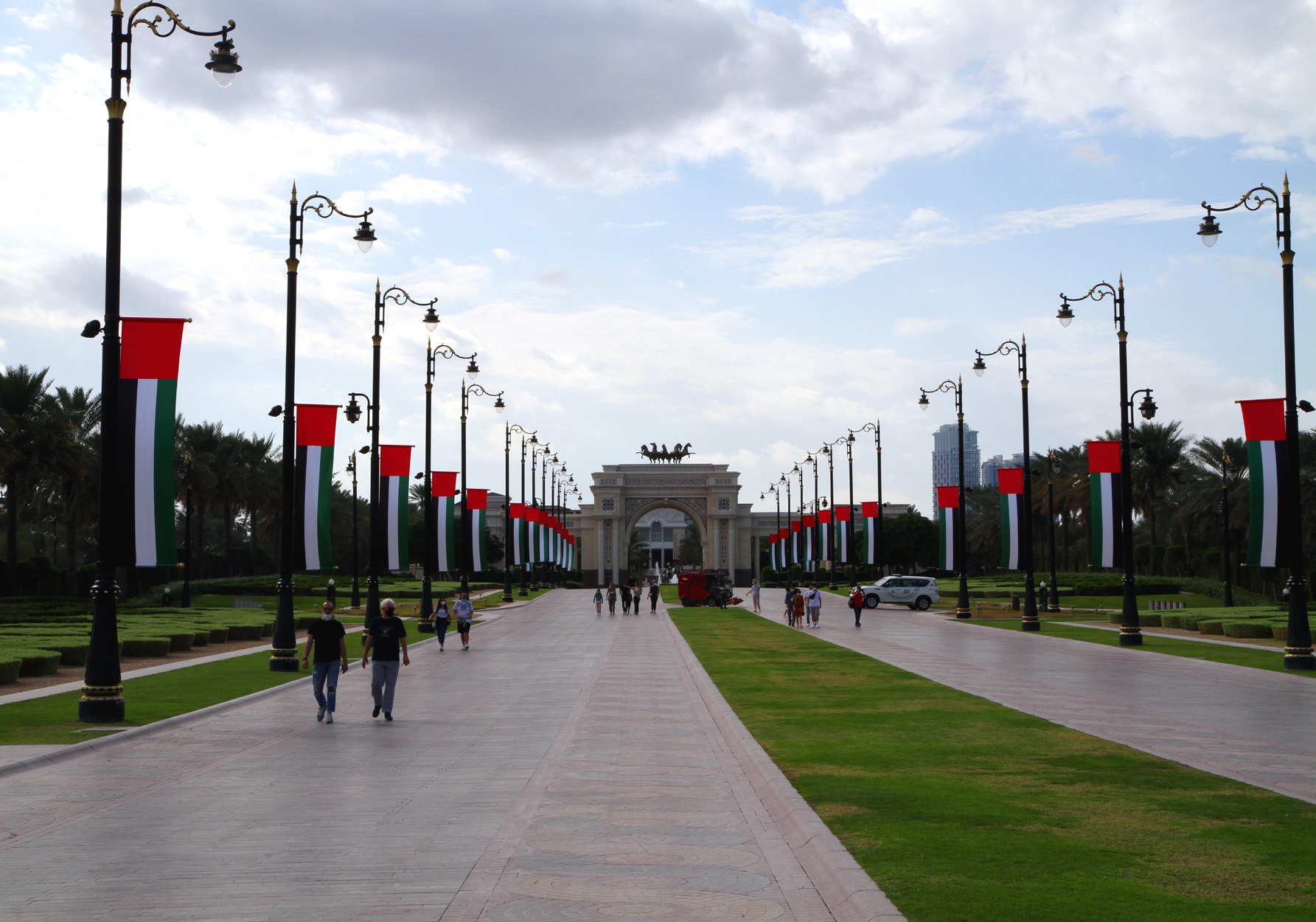
- The approach to the Zabeel Palace in Dubai, United Arab Emirates
- Interactive map of the Zabeel Palace area

General information
- Type: Royal residence
- Location: Zabeel, Dubai, United Arab Emirates
- Coordinates: 25.2113°N 55.3020°E
- Construction started: Late 1950s — first palace 1963 — second palace
- Completed: 1965
- Owner: Al Maktoum family

Design and construction
- Architect: Otto Bulart

Zabeel Palace (Arabic: قصر زعبيل), sometimes referred to as Za'abeel Palace, is the official residence of the ruling Al Maktoum family in Dubai, United Arab Emirates. Situated in the Zabeel district, the palace serves as both the home and administrative headquarters for the family, notably for Sheikh Mohammed bin Rashid Al Maktoum, who is the current ruler of Dubai, and serves as the vice president and prime minister of the UAE.

== History ==
The original Zabeel Palace was constructed in the late 1950s, consisting of three small buildings.

In the early 1960s, Sheikh Rashid bin Saeed Al Maktoum commissioned a new palace to accommodate the growing needs of the ruling family. The construction, led by architect Otto Bulart of Overseas AST, began in 1963 and was completed in 1965. The design integrated the existing structures into a single complex, reflecting a blend of traditional Arabic and modern architectural styles. Sheikh Rashid resided in the palace until his death in 1990.

== Function and significance ==
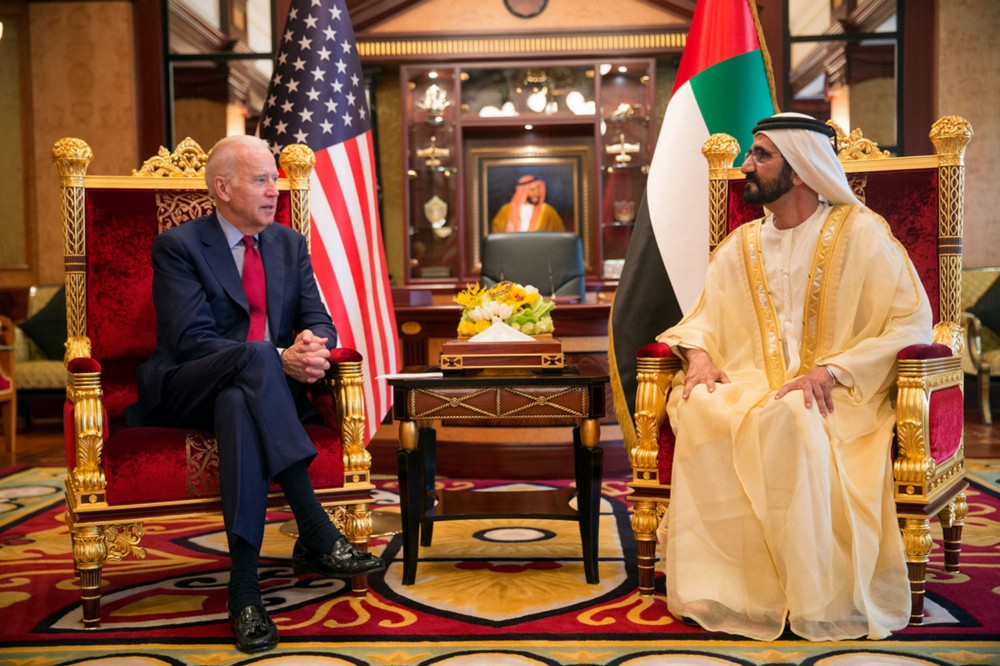
Vice President Joe Biden (left) meets with Sheikh Mohammed bin Rashid Al Maktoum, at Zabeel Palace on 8 March, 2016.

As the official residence of the Ruler of Dubai, Zabeel Palace is a central hub for governance, state affairs, and high-level interactions within the emirate of Dubai. The palace serves as the venue for official meetings, diplomatic receptions, and ceremonial events. It is an important setting for receiving international dignitaries, heads of state, and prominent visitors. For example, the palace hosted bilateral meetings between Sheikh Mohammed bin Rashid Al Maktoum and then-Vice President of the United States Joe Biden in March 2016.

Zabeel Palace plays a significant role in local governance and the administration of Dubai's judicial and business sectors with Sheikh Mohammed frequently using the palace to hold majlis meetings with local dignitaries, investors, businessmen and senior government officials. The palace is also the site of formal state ceremonies, such as the swearing-in of judges and other government officials.

Zabeel Palace also serves as the venue for cultural and religious occasions. Each year, Sheikh Mohammed receives dignitaries, ministers, senior figures, heads of department and government authorities, citizens, tribal representatives, and officials from Arab, Islamic and foreign countries at the palace during celebrations such as Eid al-Fitr and Eid al-Adha.

The surrounding Zabeel district further underscores the palace's importance, as it was historically the residence of Sheikh Rashid bin Saeed Al Maktoum, the former ruler of Dubai, who laid the foundations for the emirate’s transformation into a global city.

== Public access ==
Being a royal residence, Zabeel Palace itself is not opened to the public. It is regarded as one of the most guarded areas in Dubai with strict security measures in place to ensure the privacy and safety of the ruling family, and visitors are advised to respect these protocols during their visit, who can view its impressive facade and the surrounding gardens from a distance. Peacocks are often found in the garden.

The palace is located at a distance of 6 km from the Dubai Frame, 14 km from the Dubai International Airport, and 5 km from the Burj Khalifa.

== See also ==
- Al Maktoum family
- Sheikh Mohammed bin Rashid Al Maktoum
