= Saeed Al Maktoum =

Saeed Al Maktoum may refer to any person with Saeed given name in Al Maktoum family, the royal house of Dubai:

- Saeed bin Maktoum bin Hasher Al Maktoum (1878–1958), ruler of Dubai as Saeed II
- Saeed bin Maktoum bin Rashid Al Maktoum, (born 1976) participate at 2004 Summer Olympics Shooting, Saeed II great-grand son
