= Al Amardhi =

Wadi Al Amardi وادي العمردي
- Community
- Country: United Arab Emirates
- Emirate: Dubai
- City: Dubai

Al Amardhi (Arabic: وادي العمردي), aka Wadi Alamardi, is a locality on the outskirts of Dubai, United Arab Emirates (UAE).
