= Saeed bin Maktoum bin Hasher Al Maktoum =

- Sheikh
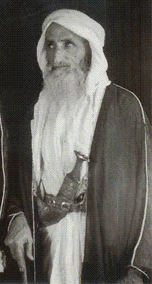
- Sheikh Saeed in 1950

Ruler of Dubai
- Reign: November 29, 1912 – September 9, 1958
- Predecessor: Butti bin Suhail Al Maktoum
- Successor: Rashid bin Saeed Al Maktoum
- Born: 1878; Dubai
- Died: 9 September 1958 (aged 80); Dubai
- Spouse: Hessa bint Al Mur Al Falasi; Fatima bint Ahmed bin Suliman
- Issue: Rashid; Khalifa; Shaikha; Moza; Ahmed
Names
- Sheikh Saeed bin Maktoum bin Hasher bin Maktoum bin Butti bin Suhail Al Maktoum
- House: Al Maktoum
- Father: Maktoum bin Hasher Al Maktoum

Sheikh Saeed bin Maktoum bin Hasher Al Maktoum (1878 – 9 September 1958) (Arabic: سعيد بن مكتوم آل مكتوم) was the longest-serving Ruler of Dubai, from 1912 until his death in 1958. He presided over Dubai during the end of the pearling boom and through the long and difficult recession that followed the collapse of the pearling market, transforming Dubai into an active trading hub which developed new markets and economic opportunities.

Despite continuing a long tradition of liberal, trade-minded rulers, he faced pressure from a number of leading figures in Dubai to reform the governance of the town and was eventually forced to quell what became an active rebellion against his rule.

In later life he ceded many of the responsibilities for driving Dubai's economic growth to his son, Rashid.

== Background ==
Saeed bin Maktoum was the son of Maktoum bin Hasher, who ruled Dubai from 1894 to 1906. Following Maktoum's death, his cousin Butti bin Suhail Al Maktoum ruled for six years, before his own death in 1912.

Suffering from a stroke on 15 October 1912 that paralysed his left hand, Butti bin Suhail died on 29 November at the end of the pearling season. His cousin, Saeed bin Maktoum's smooth accession was guaranteed by Sheikh Butti bin Rashid Al Maktoum, the son of the former Ruler Rashid bin Maktoum, who managed the transition. However, Saeed's rule commenced at a difficult time, with an outbreak of plague on the coast. Saeed moved out of the town to the interior, as did many of the wealthier families of Dubai. Empty houses left as a consequence were looted: some twenty people were dying daily and mortality in Dubai during the first quarter of 1913 was estimated at 1,300. The plague ravaged the entire coast and, in August, Sheikh Butti bin Rashid Al Maktoum, contracted the disease and died of it.

Aged 34 at his accession, Sheikh Saeed inherited a small but thriving trading port and a pearling centre which employed some 7,000 men in the seasonal trade. A simple man, Saeed travelled to hunt in the desert and was respected for his staunch Islamic values.

Relations with neighbouring sheikhs were stable, as was Saeed's relationship with the British. The pearling industry was still lucrative, although facing clear signs of over-fishing and difficult market demand, and trade was based on a lively re-export market, particularly to surrounding Arab sheikhdoms and Persia.

Following the movement of merchants from Lingeh to Dubai in the early years of the 20th century, another migration took place with increasingly restrictive conditions for trade being experienced in Southern Persia. Many more merchants from the areas of Bastak and Lingeh moved to Dubai, where they were welcomed. A number had established businesses in Dubai but hadn't moved their families and, in the 1920s, many of these made the move to Dubai permanent. There had long been a trading relationship between Dubai and Bastak, with the latter being a major source of firewood for the coastal communities of the Persian Gulf.

=== The collapse of the pearl trade ===
As this new influx of trading families took place, storm clouds were brewing over the pearling market. The accepted narrative is that the Gulf pearling industry was decimated by a double blow, the invention of the cultured pearl by the Japanese entrepreneur Kokichi Mikimoto and the Great Depression of 1929. Between them, these two events caused the decline of the pearl fisheries, plunging the economies of the Trucial Coast into penury and extreme hardship. According to contemporary research, this narrative is disputed and was derived from two entries in the 1929 and 1930 British Residency Monthly Report by Hugh Biscoe, a newly arrived administrator with a lifetime of experience in India and none in the Gulf. Over-fishing, regional and world wars, poor weather and problems with mounting debt had sent the industry into decline some 20 years before Biscoe's memo, with reports of consistently poor harvests and depressed markets since 1910. By the time of Biscoe's reports, the failing industry was already beyond recovery and the Great Depression and cultured pearl had played no role in its decline.

However, this slow collapse took place during the opening years of Saeed's rule, following on from the plague along the coast. The complex system of financing that underpinned the pearling industry, the relationship between owners, pearl merchants, nakhudas (captains) and divers and pullers fell apart and left an increasingly large number of working men in the town facing destitution.

A record number of slaves approached the British Agent seeking manumission, a reflection of the parlous state of the pearling fleet and its owners.

By 1926, the very existence of the pearling industry was in question across the Trucial Coast and indebtedness ran throughout the whole pearling ecosystem to the point where merchants could not provide advances or supplies to divers and haulers. The Trucial rulers, first Sultan bin Saqr Al Qasimi of Sharjah and then Saeed bin Maktoum as well as the Rulers of Ajman and Umm Al Quwain, settled the advances on divers at 100 rupees and two bags of rice and seventy rupees and one bag of rice on haulers. This was quarter of the normal sum advanced to the pearlers. The boats started out for the banks late and the season was once again bad and earnings for the average boat dropped 40 per cent on the previous year. In November 1926, so desperate was the situation, that fourteen boats set out from Dubai to try for a late season around Socotra in Yemen and even, with Italian permission, Eritrea.

=== New markets ===
In 1934, Sheikh Rashid concluded an agreement with Imperial Airways for flights to take place through Dubai, with flights commencing in 1937. The agreement brought welcome revenue. He also signed a preliminary agreement for an oil concession (with British company Petroleum Concessions Ltd) on 22 May 1937, stipulating that local labour would have to be used in an effort to create employment for the people of Dubai. Alongside these efforts, Dubai's traders found new markets in Persia, trading sugar, tea, cloth, hides and even cement into the Persian mainland. Their increasing prosperity came a time when Dubai's traditional wealthy class, the pearl merchants and boat owners, faced penury. This led to growing tensions and rising discontent among some of the more influential families of the town, particularly those based in Deira, which was becoming increasingly lawless - including a rise in gambling and prostitution.

In 1930, Sheikh Saeed banished prostitutes from Dubai but the lawlessless of Deira persisted and so on 19 January 1936, Saeed bin Maktoum appointed his cousin Sheikh Saeed bin Butti bin Suhail as Wali over Deira, telling him to take whatever measures were necessary to clean up the area and restore the rule of law. Saeed bin Butti acted decisively, imposing a 4pm curfew (enforced with a beating and a night in the city jail) and clamped down on gambling and theft. The move was highly unpopular with Saeed's cousins in Deira but they climbed down faced by his censure.

== Majlis ==
The Majlis movement of 1938 was a reflection of the discontent felt by a number of leading figures in Dubai, including members of the Maktoum family itself. In October 1938 the situation had deteriorated to the point where Dubai was split into two armed camps by its creek: Deira was held by the discontented members of the Al Bu Falasah and Bur Dubai by Sheikh Saeed and his followers. Following mediation by other Rulers and the British Political Agent, who travelled from Bahrain, on 20 October an agreement was signed establishing the Majlis, a consultative council of fifteen leading community members to be headed by Sheikh Saeed.

Dubai’s fledgling taxi service was operated as a side-line by the Ruler Saeed Al Maktoum’s 26 year old son, Rashid bin Saeed. When a rival service was started up by Rashid's cousin, Maktoum bin Rashid of Deira, the driver of Maktoum bin Rashid’s taxi was assaulted. The Al Bu Falasah of Deira, Saeed Al Maktoum’s cousins and other extended family, rose up and started to hold meetings to discuss their discontentment with affairs in general.

A list of demands were sent to Saeed, including the establishment of a ‘civil list’, reforms of education, sanitation, peace and order, the removal of corruption and, tellingly, the ‘Grant of justice and freedom of the inhabitants in trade and other crafts’. On 18 June 1938, the group made their intentions clear - if their demands were not met, they would use force. On 19 June 1938, the watchtowers of Deira were occupied by the rebels and an incensed Saeed bin Maktoum was convinced by the British Residency Agent to hold back his force of 400 armed Bedouin.

Saeed bin Maktoum formed a ‘conciliation committee’ to be led by his brother, Juma, to negotiate with the Al Bu Falasah. Juma agreed to most of the points raised by the dissident faction, led by Sheikh Mana bin Rashid and Hasher bin Rashid Al Maktoum. On 9 October 1938, the Awlad Rashid (sons of Rashid Bin Maktoum), as the group of dissidents had become known, took over the Burj Nahar – Nahar Tower – in Deira. Two days later, they seized the Deira Customs House.

Backed into a corner, Saeed bin Maktoum agreed to the foundation of the Majlis, an assembly which would meet under his presidency or, if he were not present, the presidency of one of the members of the Majlis. The assembly proposed would effectively run the affairs of the town and the Ruler would have to consult it before taking any decisions. The agreement was signed by Saeed bin Maktoum as Ruler and Mana bin Rashid ‘on behalf of the Al Bu Falasah’.

The Majlis set up a number of Municipal bodies, including a Municipal Council and a Council of Merchants, as well as the post of Director of Education, taken by Mana Al Maktoum. The Majlis wasn't only concerned with practical matters, however, but also sought to limit the Ruler's financial standing and call for political reform.

Sheikh Saeed quickly became discontented with the Majlis process and recused himself from the meetings of the council. The reforms quickly unravelled and law and order broke down as the Awlad Rashid appointed cronies and oppressed the merchants in the souk.

== Wedding party ==
The wife of Hamdan bin Zayed, the Ruler of Abu Dhabi who had been killed in 1922, had fled to Dubai and taken refuge with her family, the Marar tribe, who lived in the area of Deira by the same name. Her daughter, Latifa caught Rashid Bin Saeed’s eye and a wedding was agreed. Fifteen days of celebrations in Dubai were to be followed by fifteen days of celebrations in Deira. After fifteen days of traditional Bedouin celebrations in Dubai, on 22 March 1939 the celebrations moved to the Marar family side of the creek – Deira.

The Majlis group was increasingly concerned at the wild celebrants crossing the creek from Dubai to Deira on the numerous abras or water taxes. As the number of armed bedouin arriving in Deira rose, they panicked and broke the treaty by occupying the towers of Deira. At 4pm on the 29th March, a gunshot rang out and Rashid bin Saeed's men fell on the Awlad Rashid, took the towers and therefore control of Deira. Some 500 men under Rashid included the Marar, Sudan and the men of the Al Ras area of Deira - the main souk. Fierce fighting led to ten of the Majlis' force being killed. By morning, the Majlis was over, its ringleader had fled to Sharjah disguised as a woman and something like twenty six people were dead.

== Economic growth ==
In the aftermath of the Majlis, Saeed Al Maktoum established two assemblies – one, the Advisory Majlis represented tribal leaders. The second, the Majlis Al Tujarah was appointed on 6 April 1939 and represented the merchants and traders of the town.

Although he was to rule for a further 20 years, Saeed increasingly avoided political life and ceded the administration of Dubai to Sheikh Rashid, his son. Rashid implemented a far-sighted program of sweeping reform that encompassed many of the intended reforms the Majlis had claimed to want but also added his own impetus to the drive to develop and reform Dubai, transforming the small trading port into a modern city-state within a generation. Rashid was to act as de facto ruler of Dubai from the period following World War II onwards.

By 1950, the British Residency was clearly at a loss to explain the source of Dubai's wealth, which had by now grown to be considerable:

Dubai, in contrast with the moribund Sharjah eleven miles away, is a flourishing town... there is already a business-like air around the place, thanks to the Post Office, the bank, a branch of Messrs Gray Mackenzie and the offices of Petroleum Development (Trucial Coast) Limited... to judge by the prosperous appearance of the bazaar and by the lively atmosphere of the whole town, its income, for a miniature port of perhaps eight to ten thousand inhabitants must even today be considerable. The Sheikh and the merchants give one the impression they are not dissatisfied with present blessings and that they view the future hopefully.

In 1954 Dubai established a municipality.

The increasing activities of Petroleum Development (Trucial Coast), which had secured a number of exploratory concessions in the area, meant increased economic activity and Dubai acted to accommodate the infrastructure required to take the opportunity. In 1954, Sir William Halcrow and Partners were brought in to survey the Creek and then the Overseas Ast Company carried out the dredging operation. Loans, the issue of 'Creek Bonds' and reselling the land reclaimed by the dredging operations all helped to pay for the operation, which took place through the end of 1958 and into 1959. By now Sheikh Saeed was elderly and infirm and the British were urging Sheikh Rashid to take over from his father, which he refused to do.

== Family ==
Saeed married Sheikha Hessa bint Al Murr, the mother of all his children except his youngest child, Ahmed. Saeed married a second time to Sheikha Fatima bint Ahmed bin Suliman.

== Death ==
Sheikh Saeed died early in the morning of 10 September 1958 at the age of 80 and was succeeded by his eldest son, Sheikh Rashid bin Saeed Al Maktoum. Two months after Saeed's death, his second wife bore a son, Sheikh Ahmed bin Saeed Al Maktoum, on 1 December of that year. Sheikh Ahmed today serves as chairman and CEO of the airline Emirates.

== See also ==
- House of Maktoum

Preceded by Butti bin Suhail Al Maktoum	Ruler of Dubai; 1912–1958	Succeeded by Rashid bin Saeed Al Maktoum
