= Fateh Oil Field =

Oil production area in the United Arab Emirates

- Location within United Arab Emirates
- Country: Dubai, United Arab Emirates
- Region: Persian Gulf
- Offshore/onshore: offshore
- Coordinates: 25.5833°N 54.4167°E

Field history
- Discovery: 1966
- Start of production: 1969

The Fateh Oil Field (Arabic: حقل فتح) is an area of offshore oil production approximately 60 miles (97 km) from Dubai and within emirate of Dubai territorial waters in the Persian Gulf. The oil field is managed by Dubai Petroleum.

== History ==
The oil field was discovered in 1966. In 1968, Continental Oil Company announced plans to construct a 500,000 barrels (79,000 m^{3}) underwater oil storage facility to hold petroleum extracted from the field. The underwater storage was a world first, as before that time, offshore oil production had been channeled to onshore storage and tanker loading facilities. The first of these underwater holding tanks, called "Khazzan", was completed in 1969, the date the first barrel of oil was shipped from the field to world markets on September 22, 1969.

In 2014, significant volumes of gas were discovered in deep gas exploration well at the Fateh oil field.
