= Maktoum bin Hasher Al Maktoum =

- Sheikh

Ruler of Dubai
- Reign: April 7, 1894 – February 16, 1906
- Predecessor: Rashid bin Maktoum Al Maktoum
- Successor: Butti bin Suhail Al Maktoum
- Died: 16 February 1906
- Issue: Saeed bin Maktoum Al Maktoum; Juma bin Maktoum Al Maktoum
Names
- Sheikh Maktoum bin Hasher bin Maktoum bin Butti bin Suhail Al Maktoum
- House: Al Maktoum
- Father: Hasher bin Maktoum Al Maktoum
- Religion: Islam

Sheikh Maktoum bin Hasher Al Maktoum was the Ruler of Dubai from April 7, 1894 to February 16, 1906. The fifth Maktoum Ruler since the establishment of the dynasty in 1833. Maktoum's short but 'liberal and enlightened' reign was to transform the coastal port. He was responsible for the establishment of the trading community of Dubai, encouraging disaffected merchants from Lingeh to bring their businesses to Dubai after the Persian government had introduced unpopular taxes.

== Accession ==
Maktoum bin Hasher came to power following the death of his uncle, Sheikh Rashid bin Maktoum, who had entered into the 1892 Exclusive Agreement with the British. The latest in a number of treaties signed since the General Maritime Treaty of 1820, which bound the Trucial Sheikhs to maintain peace at sea, the Exclusive Agreement bound Dubai and its other signatories to protectorate status, including an undertaking not to "cede, sell, mortgage or otherwise give for occupation any part territory, except to the British Government".

His rule was briefly contested by Sheikh Rashid's sons, Buti and Saeed, who were arrested and imprisoned in Dubai's Al Fahidi Fort. Following a period of intense campaigning from the friends of the two, Maktoum accepted an offer made by the Ruler of Sharjah, Sheikh Saqr bin Khalid Al Qassimi, to take them as exiles and, after five months' imprisonment, they were freed and lived in Sharjah for the remainder of Maktoum's reign returning only on his death and the accession of Sheikh Butti bin Suhail Al Maktoum in 1906.

While his predecessor was involved in a number of conflicts along the coast and was an active participant in the tribal politics of the interior (Rashid married into the Na’im tribe of Buraimi and was party to Zayed’s subjugation of the oasis), Maktoum focused purely on the development of his port and harbour and its role as a thriving regional entrepôt.

== Rule ==
In 1896, fire broke out in Dubai, a disastrous occurrence in a town where many family homes were still constructed from barasti - palm fronds. The conflagration consumed half the houses of Bur Dubai, while the district of Deira was said to have been totally destroyed. The following year, more fires broke out. A female slave was caught in the act of starting one such blaze and was subsequently put to death.

Despite these setbacks for the community, Maktoum's rule saw the fast expansion of the pearling industry as well as the opening of new businesses along Dubai's increasingly busy creekside wharfage. Dubai's population at the time was estimated by J. G. Lorimer at some 10,000 people, with 250 houses established at Shindagha, the traditional area settled by the Al Bu Falasah.

Dubai in 1900 was a thriving mercantile hub, becoming recognised as the principal port in the region. In 1901, Maktoum established Dubai as a free port with no taxation on imports or exports and also gave merchants parcels of land and guarantees of protection and tolerance. These policies saw a movement of merchants not only directly from Lingeh, but also those who had settled in Ras Al Khaimah and Sharjah (which had historical links with Lingeh through the Al Qawasim) to Dubai. An indicator of the growing importance of the port of Dubai under Maktoum can be gained from the movements of the steamer of the Bombay and Persia Steam Navigation Company, which from 1899 to 1901 paid five visits annually to Dubai. In 1902 the company's vessels made 21 visits to Dubai and from 1904 on, the steamers called fortnightly – in 1906, trading seventy thousand tonnes of cargo. The frequency of these vessels only helped to accelerate Dubai's role as an emerging port and trading hub of preference. Lorimer noted the transfer from Lingeh 'bids fair to become complete and permanent.'

Maktoum was instrumental in convening the first formal meeting of the Sheikhs of the Trucial Coast in April 1905. That meeting was effectively presided over by Sheikh Zayed 'the Great' of Abu Dhabi, Sheikh Saqr bin Khalid Al Qasimi of Sharjah, Sheikh Rashid bin Ahmad Al Mualla of Umm Al Quwain, and Sheikh Abdulaziz bin Humaid Al Nuaimi of Ajman. The meeting was called as the result of a dispute which had arisen between Masfout and Hajarain (today known as Hatta) in the Wadi Hatta, in which the Bani Qitab tribe had built a fort in the wadi and were stopping caravans passing to and from Oman. Masfout at the time was linked to the Na'im of Buraimi, while Hajarain had been previously ceded to Sheikh Hasher bin Maktoum by the Omani Sultan, Turki bin Said.

Maktoum also entered into a further treaty with the British in 1902, committing to abolishing arms trading.

== The Fath Al Khair incident ==
In Autumn 1903, the Fath Al Khair, an Omani vessel flying a French flag, foundered off Dubai and there were accusations that it had been subsequently plundered. The vessel was regarded by the French Vice-Consul in Muscat as being under his protection and he applied directly to Maktoum bin Hasher for reparations, intending to despatch a cruiser to Dubai to enforce his message. At this point, the Government in India advised the British resident in the Persian Gulf to inform the French of the existence of the Exclusive Agreement and its terms. It was agreed in 1904 that the British would take over the French case. It was heard in the Sharia court in Dubai and compensation was awarded to the owner of the vessel, which had sunk as the consequence of a collision. This incident was the first test of the Exclusive Agreement, which in this instance benefited Dubai.

== Death ==
Maktoum died of heart disease in Dubai on 16 February 1906, leaving behind him a unified Dubai with a thriving port and a pearl trade directly employing some 7,000 men. He was succeeded by Sheikh Butti bin Suhail Al Maktoum.

Preceded by Rashid bin Maktoum	Ruler of Dubai; 1894–1906	Succeeded by Butti bin Suhail Al Maktoum
