= Obeid bin Said bin Rashid =

First ruler of Dubai

- Ruler

Ruler of Dubai
- Joint: July 9, 1833–1836
- Successor: Maktoum bin Butti Al Maktoum
- Co-Ruler: Maktoum bin Butti Al Maktoum
- Died: 1836; Dubai

Obeid bin Said bin Rashid was the first Ruler of Dubai (today one of the United Arab Emirates), jointly leading a migration of the tribe from Abu Dhabi alongside Maktoum bin Butti bin Suhail. He ruled for three years prior to his death in 1836.

== Migration ==
Dubai is thought to have first been established as a fishing village on the Trucial Coast in the early 18th century. It was then a tributary to the Bani Yas tribe of Abu Dhabi.

By 1820, the town was ruled on Abu Dhabi Sheikh Tahnun bin Shakhbut Al Nahyan's behalf by a regent, when the General Maritime Treaty of 1820 was signed between the sheikhs of the South Eastern Persian Gulf coast and the British. The regent, Saeed bin Saif bin Zaal, signed the treaty on behalf of his nephew, Sheikh Mohammed bin Hazza bin Zaal, who was at the time in his minority.

By 1822, Dubai had grown to be a town of some 700–800 residents.

Mohammed bin Hazza remained head man of Dubai until the arrival of the Al Bu Falasah in 1833. At that point, aged 23, Mohammed stepped aside and allowed the Al Bu Falasah to make Dubai their home.

The migration of some 800 members of the Al Bu Falasah was triggered by a coup which removed Sheikh Tahnun as Ruler of Abu Dhabi and the Bani Yas tribe. A subsection of the Bani Yas, the Al Bu Falasah disagreed with the actions of the new Ruler, Sheikh Khalifa bin Shakhbut Al Nahyan and moved north to Dubai, which at the time consisted of a settlement of some 250 houses at Shindagha and the Al Fahidi Fort on the other side of the Ghubaiba inlet. The migration would have been an arduous undertaking, and took place over some time throughout and following the pearling season of that year (typically May to November).

The move to establish the rule of Obeid and Maktoum was unwelcome to Sultan bin Saqr Al Qasimi of Sharjah, who had arranged a dynastic marriage with the sister of former headman Mohammed bin Hazza bin Zaal. The Sultan of Muscat had also made it clear he had designs on the town.

Obeid bin Said bin Rashid died of old age and was succeeded by Maktoum, the founder of the Maktoum dynasty that rules Dubai today.

== See also ==
- Al Maktoum
- History of the United Arab Emirates

Preceded by Mohammed bin Hazza Al Zaal	Ruler of Dubai; 1833–1836	Succeeded by Maktoum bin Butti bin Suhail
