= Maktoum bin Butti Al Maktoum =

Emirati ruler

Maktoum bin Butti bin Suhail
- Sheikh

Ruler of Dubai
- Reign: 9 July 1833 – 1852
- Predecessor: Obeid bin Said bin Rashid
- Successor: Saeed bin Butti Al Maktoum
- Died: 1852
- Issue: Hasher bin Maktoum Al Maktoum; Rashid bin Maktoum Al Maktoum; Suhail bin Maktoum Al Maktoum
Names
- Sheikh Maktoum bin Butti bin Suhail Al Maktoum
- House: Al Maktoum
- Father: Butti bin Suhail Al Maktoum

Sheikh Maktoum bin Butti bin Suhail Al Maktoum (Arabic: مكتوم بن بطي) was the joint founder and first ruler of Dubai, today one of the United Arab Emirates, alongside Obeid bin Said bin Rashid, with whom he led a migration of the Al Bu Falasah from Abu Dhabi, seceding from the Bani Yas. Maktoum was the founder of the Al Maktoum dynasty.

He was a signatory to the 1843 Maritime Truce, the precursor to the Perpetual Maritime Truce of 1853, as well as the 1847 treaty to abolish the slave trade.

== Migration ==
Dubai is thought to have first been established as a fishing village on the Trucial Coast in the early 18th century. It was then a tributary to the Bani Yas tribe of Abu Dhabi.

By 1820, the town was ruled on Abu Dhabi Sheikh Tahnun bin Shakhbut Al Nahyan's behalf by a regent, when the General Maritime Treaty of 1820 was signed between the sheikhs of the South Eastern Persian Gulf coast and the British. The regent, Saeed bin Saif bin Zaal, signed the treaty on behalf of his nephew, Sheikh Mohammed bin Hazza bin Zaal, who was at the time in his minority.

By 1822, Dubai had grown to be a town of some 700–800 residents.

Mohammed bin Hazza remained head man of Dubai until the arrival of the Al Bu Falasah in 1833. At that point, aged 23, Mohammed stepped aside and allowed the Al Bu Falasah to make Dubai their home.

The migration of some 800 members of the Al Bu Falasah was triggered by a coup which removed Sheikh Tahnun as Ruler of Abu Dhabi and the Bani Yas tribe. A subsection of the Bani Yas, the Al Bu Falasah disagreed with the actions of the new Ruler, Sheikh Khalifa bin Shakhbut Al Nahyan and moved north to Dubai, which at the time consisted of a settlement of some 250 houses at Shindagha and the Al Fahidi Fort on the other side of the Ghubaiba inlet. The migration would have been an arduous undertaking, and took place over some time throughout and following the pearling season of that year (typically May to November).

The move to establish the rule of Obeid and Maktoum was unwelcome to Sultan bin Saqr Al Qasimi of Sharjah, who had arranged a dynastic marriage with the sister of former headman Mohammed bin Hazza bin Zaal. The Sultan of Muscat had also made it clear he had designs on the town.

Obeid bin Said bin Rashid died of old age in 1836 and was succeeded by Maktoum, who was the founder of the Maktoum dynasty that rules Dubai today.

== Rule ==
Having established the Al Bu Falasah in Dubai, Maktoum proceeded to consolidate his position, taking over entirely when Obeid bin Said died of old age in 1836. The settlement expanded, with the natural port in the area near the Al Fahidi Fort providing a wharfage for trading vessels as well as pearling boats.

Khalifa bin Shakhbut of Abu Dhabi was in favour of punishing Dubai for the nature of the Maktoums' secession and in May 1838 led a raid against the town when its pearling fleet had departed for the season's fishing. The raiding party invested a watchtower in Dubai which was the scene of fierce fighting, eventually retaken by Dubai forces but completely destroyed in the process.

In 1840, Maktoum actively encouraged Saqr bin Sultan Al Qasimi, the Wali of Sharjah, to declare independence from his father Sultan bin Saqr Al Qasimi, the ruler of Ras Al Khaimah and head of the Qawasim federation. In this, his aim was the creation of a friendly buffer state between Dubai and the aggressive Sultan bin Saqr. Saqr bin Sultan was eventually deposed and taken to Ras Al Khaimah but escaped and sought refuge in Dubai.

Sultan bin Saqr, enraged by Saqr's escape to Dubai, agreed with Khalifa bin Shakhbut of Abu Dhabi on the destruction of Dubai. Sultan then invited Abdulla bin Rashid Al Mualla of Umm Al Quwain to join the coalition against the town. Faced with almost certain ruin, Maktoum offered Sultan bin Saqr his submission and 1,000 dollars and Sultan not only abandoned his plan, but reinstated Saqr bin Sultan as Wali of Sharjah.

A substantial majority of the Al Bu Muhair tribe became dissatisfied with Maktoum's rule, with some 500 removing themselves from Dubai to settle in Sharjah in 1841. Following their departure and that of the fleet for the pearling season, Dubai was hit with a violent outbreak of fever, which saw many of its people fleeing across the creek to settle temporarily in Deira, then under Sharjah's rule, with Saqr bin Sultan's blessing. The town of Bur Dubai itself being virtually abandoned, Khalifa bin Shakhbut fell on it with a force of some 150 men, plundering the town and destroying date plantations and food stores as well as firing any boats his men came across. Maktoum raised a force including 200 men from Sharjah but, following the occupation of Jumeirah, Khalifa's forces looted the Sharjah town of Al Khan and captured 15 slaves before his victorious army returned to Abu Dhabi.

Khalifa then raised another army to move northwards, aiming to take Dubai and Sharjah but they were met with a combined force and Khalifa's camel was shot out from under him. Beaten back, Khalifa sued for peace with Maktoum and the two reconciled. By 1843 the two rulers were close friends and allies. Perhaps encouraged by his new-found friend, Khalifa went to war with the tribes of the interior, particularly the Bani Qitab, Ghafalah and Na'im. Supporting Khalifa's successful raid and sack of the interior town of Dhaid, Maktoum led his forces against the Ghafalah and put them to flight, losing an eye in the process.

Khalifa had established primacy over the interior tribes by 1844, when he brought together a gathering of them at Buraimi in the summer. The Omani Walis of both Sohar and Shinas, as well as representatives of the interior tribes, presented themselves. Maktoum, invited to settle with the Ghafalah, sent Saeed bin Butti, his brother, to the negotiations - fearful of his own safety.

== Trucial relations ==
Although it was Obeid bin Said bin Rashid who acceded to the first of the annual maritime truces established by the British in 1835, Maktoum signed the following truces until, in 1843, Maktoum signed the ten-year Maritime Truce, which was to become the model for the Perpetual Maritime Truce of 4 May 1853. The perpetual truce effectively established a British protectorate on the Trucial Coast, but was signed by Maktoum's successor, Saeed bin Butti.

By 1844, Maktoum bin Butti was actively reinforcing the maritime truce, stepping in to punish the combatants when a fight broke out between Al Qasimi and Ka’abi pearling boats, forcing them to lodge a bond with the British Residency Agent in Sharjah against their good behaviour.

Maktoum also signed the 1847 Engagement to Prohibit Exportation of Slaves From Africa on board of Vessels Belonging to Bahrain and to the Trucial States and to Allow Right of Search of April–May 1847.

He died at sea of smallpox while travelling from Muscat to Qeshm in 1852.

== See also ==
- House of Maktoum
- Dubai
- History of the United Arab Emirates

Preceded by Obeid bin Said bin Rashid	Ruler of Dubai; 1833–1852	Succeeded by Saeed bin Butti
