= Marar (tribe) =

Bedouin tribe of the United Arab Emirates

The Marar (singular Al Marri) is a tribe of the United Arab Emirates (UAE), a subsection of the Bani Yas.

The Marar are traditionally Hinawi, Maliki Sunnis and formed part of the tribal confederation brought together by Zayed bin Khalifa Al Nahyan, 'Zayed the Great', of Abu Dhabi. In 1890, under Zayed, the Marar and Manasir tribes were involved in a series of raids on the coast between Abu Dhabi and Dubai, capturing 400 camels and 100 horses.

The Marar had also settled in Dubai and under Sheikh Rashid bin Maktoum of Dubai, in 1891, some 400 men of the Marar, considering themselves ill-treated by Rashid, ended the pearling season by sailing their boats to Sharjah and subsequently settling there. This action led to three years of bitter negotiations, arbitrated by the British Resident, settling financial claims and counter claims which led to a number of further conflicts on land.

By the turn of the 19th century, the Marar were to be found in Sharjah, Abu Dhabi and Dubai as well as Liwa, with 200 houses in the Layyah area of Sharjah (today home to Sharjah's main power station and desalination plant), 40 in Abu Dhabi and 30 in Dubai. The Bedouin Marar consisted of some 70 families in Liwa, closely related to the Mazari, while the Marar of the towns were traditionally pearl divers.

== Prominent figures ==
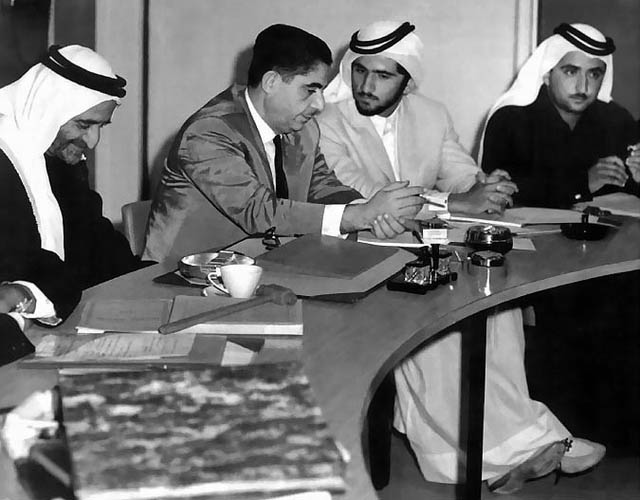
Left to right: Sheikh Rashid, an advisor, and Sheikh Rashid's sons Mohammed and Maktoum, both to become future rulers of Dubai, pictured in 1968.

Sheikh Rashid bin Saeed Al Maktoum's mother, Sheikha Hessa bint Al Mur bin Hureiz Al Falasi, was Marar, as was his wife, Sheikha Latifa bint Hamdan Al Nahyan, the daughter of the ruler of Abu Dhabi Sheikh Hamdan bin Zayed Al Nahyan. Latifa had fled to Dubai from Abu Dhabi with her mother when her father was killed. She is the mother of the current ruler of Dubai, Mohammed bin Rashid Al Maktoum. Hamdan's other daughter, Maryam, died in November 2020.

The area of Deira in Dubai that was traditionally settled by the Marar today bears their name, transliterated variously as Al Murar and also commonly Al Marar.
