= Hasher bin Maktoum Al Maktoum =

- Sheikh

Ruler of Dubai
- Reign: December 1859 – November 22, 1886
- Predecessor: Saeed bin Butti Al Maktoum
- Successor: Rashid bin Maktoum Al Maktoum
- Died: 22 November 1886
- Issue: Maktoum bin Hasher Al Maktoum
Names
- Sheikh Hasher bin Maktoum bin Butti bin Suhail Al Maktoum
- House: Al Maktoum
- Father: Maktoum bin Butti Al Maktoum

Sheikh Hasher bin Maktoum bin Butti Al Maktoum (Arabic: حشر بن مكتوم بن بطي آلمكتوم, romanized: Ḥashar bin Maktūm bin Buṭṭī al-Maktūm) acceded to become the Ruler of Dubai in 1859, following the unexpected death by natural causes of his uncle, Sheikh Saeed bin Butti.

== Rule ==
Still young at the time of his accession, Hasher ruled over a period of economic prosperity and growth for Dubai. The maritime truce made with the British created an environment where coastal trade could flourish. The diversity of that trade included a lively market for slaves from Africa and elsewhere, and the British, contrary to their original intentions in establishing treaty relations with the Trucial Rulers, found themselves becoming more involved with the activities of the coastal communities. In 1847, they promulgated a treaty for the suppression of the slave trade, which was signed by Hasher and the other Trucial Rulers in 1856.

Under Hasher's rule, the disparate economies of the districts around the core settlement of Dubai were brought together, particularly those of Bur Dubai, Deira, Hamriyah and Jumeirah, into a single community—although the settlements of Deira and Bur Dubai, on either side of the Dubai Creek, had their own head men.

=== Treaty and conflict ===
In 1864, Hasher and the other Trucial Rulers were signatory to the 'Additional Article to the Maritime Truce Providing for the Protection of the Telegraph Line and Stations, Dated 1864'. An agreement regarding the treatment of absconding debtors followed in June 1879.

Despite the growth of Dubai as a trading port, relationships with the tribes of the interior and other coastal Rulers were not always cordial. Lorimer notes in 1875 an expedition from Dubai of 200 men to Ras Al Khaimah, where 7 were killed in fighting, followed by skirmishes along the coast which culminated in a force from Abu Dhabi and Dubai 'ravaging the gardens of Fasht and Sharjah'. Fasht is the modern day Sharjah suburb of Al Fisht, contiguous with Al Heera. This conflict was followed by a year of peace, until in 1877 further fighting broke out with the tribes of the interior and in 1877 through 1878, numerous raids were carried out by the Duru, Bani Kitab and Awamir. Tired of the conflict, a peace was arranged between the tribes and townsmen. By this time, according to Lorimer, Dubai had become 'the principal port on the coast'. By 1882, Sheikh Hasher was at peace and had established good relations with both Sharjah and Abu Dhabi.

It was during Hasher's reign that the mountain village of Hajarain, today known as Hatta, became part of Dubai after the Omani Sultan Turki bin Said, transferred the territory after finding himself unable to defend it against the Na'im of Buraimi, who had settled neighbouring Masfout (today a part of the emirate of Ajman). Hasher backed Turki against the Imam Azzan bin Qais at the 1870 Battle of Dhank, which established Turki's primacy over Oman.

In relating an account of three British subjects (two Persians and an Indian) who made claims against Hasher's subjects in 1878, Lorimer characterised Hasher as being 'A man of quick and impetuous temper even for an Arab.'

After a period of stability in the years leading up to 1885, the Trucial Coast was once again pitched into a series of conflicts between Ajman and Umm Al Quwain. In November 1885, Hasher bin Maktoum contracted an alliance with Rashid bin Humaid of Ajman and the two towns fought across their respective borders with Sharjah. The skirmishes became more serious until, on 20 January 1886, a force of 1,000 men of Dubai, Ajman and Hamriyah attacked Sharjah town, killing forty men and wounding another twenty-five, triggering a period of chaotic conflicts and shifting alliances. The ruler of Sharjah, Saqr bin Khalid Al Qasimi, appealed to the British, who sealed a peace with Dubai conditional on his renunciation of his alliance with Umm Al Quwain. Backed by Ras Al Khaimah, Umm Al Quwain remained defiant, but Hasher encouraged the warlike Shihuh to raid Ras Al Khaimah.

He died on November 22, 1886.

== See also ==
- Al Maktoum

Preceded by Saeed bin Butti	Ruler of Dubai; 1859-1886	Succeeded by Rashid bin Maktoum
