= Butti bin Suhail Al Maktoum =

Ruler of Dubai from 1906 to 1912

- Sheikh

Ruler of Dubai
- Reign: February 16, 1906 – November 29, 1912
- Predecessor: Maktoum bin Hasher Al Maktoum
- Successor: Saeed bin Maktoum bin Hasher Al Maktoum
- Born: 1850 or 1851
- Died: 29 November 1912 (age 61–62)
Names
- Sheikh Butti bin Suhail bin Maktoum bin Butti bin Suhail Al Maktoum
- House: Al Maktoum
- Father: Suhail bin Maktoum Al Maktoum

Sheikh Butti bin Suhail Al Maktoum was the ruler of Dubai from 16 February 1906 until his death in 29 November 1912, following the death of his cousin, Sheikh Maktoum bin Hasher Al Maktoum, from heart disease. He continued the liberal policies of his predecessor, expanding Dubai's trading port.

== Rule ==
Early in his reign, Butti was called to intervene in the ongoing conflict between Abu Dhabi and the influential Bani Qitab tribe which had broken out the year before. With the sheikhs of Umm Al Quwain and Sharjah also involved, a general meeting of rulers was called at Khawaneej which resulted in a settlement of the dispute in April 1906. However, in the following year the dispute flared up again with Dubai and Abu Dhabi, together with Sharjah, pitted against Umm Al Qawain. This resulted in a final agreement in which Sheikh Butti represented both Dubai and Abu Dhabi.

Dubai continued to be a thriving and expanding port: by 1907, Lorimer notes that 335 pearling boats were operating from the town (compared to 183 from Sharjah and 25 from Al Heera). Only Abu Dhabi was a larger pearling port on the Trucial Coast, sending 410 boats to the pearl beds.

The 'great storm' of 1908 struck the pearling boats of Dubai and the coastal emirates towards the end of the pearling season that year, resulting in the loss of a dozen boats and over 100 men. The disaster was a major setback for Dubai, with many families losing their breadwinner and merchants facing financial ruin. These losses came at a time when the tribes of the interior were also experiencing poverty. In a letter to Sultan Faisal Bin Turki of Muscat in 1911, Butti laments, 'Misery and poverty are raging among them, with the result that they are struggling, looting and killing among themselves.'

=== HMS Hyacinth incident ===
In 1903, Butti had travelled with Sheikh Maktoum to Sharjah at the invitation of British Viceroy and Governor-General of India, George Curzon, to a Durbar, held on 21 November, at which Curzon delivered a speech reminding the assembled Sheikhs of the benefits of the 'Pax Britannica'. The memory would have struck Butti as ironic when, seven years later, British troops were involved in a vicious firefight in Dubai, killing 37 of his people.

A lively trade in arms had grown in the Trucial States and, at the turn of the century, Sharjah and Dubai became centres for the flourishing trade. By late 1902, Lorimer records that up to 200 guns a month were being traded, despite an agreement with the British that banned the import and re-export of arms. In an attempt to curb the trade, the British ship HMS Hyacinth patrolled the coast. In December 2010, its crew suspected a group of smugglers had docked at Shindaga under cover of darkness and, early the next morning, a 100-strong landing party was sent ashore. The presence of a large armed group in the town triggered an angry reaction from locals and a firefight followed in the narrow alleys of the souq. The British party retreated after four of their men were killed and nine wounded - however, they in turn had killed 37 local men.

Adding insult to injury, the British attempted to impose a number of reparations following the incident, including a fine of 50,000 Rupees, the surrender of 400 rifles and demands to establish a telegraph station and post office onshore. Both of the latter demands ran contrary to the nature of the relationship the British government had established with the Trucial Sheikhs and Butti had already, in 1906, made his opposition to the establishment of a British Indian post office in Dubai clear to the British. The additional demands were withdrawn following a petition to the British by an enraged Butti.

Already 'an elderly man' upon acceding, Sheikh Butti bin Suhail suffered a stroke on 15 October 1912, which paralysed his left hand, and subsequently died on 29 November.

== See also ==
- Al Maktoum

Preceded by Maktoum bin Hasher Al Maktoum	Ruler of Dubai; 1906–1912	Succeeded by Saeed bin Hasher Al Maktoum
