= Dubai Museum =

Main museum of Dubai

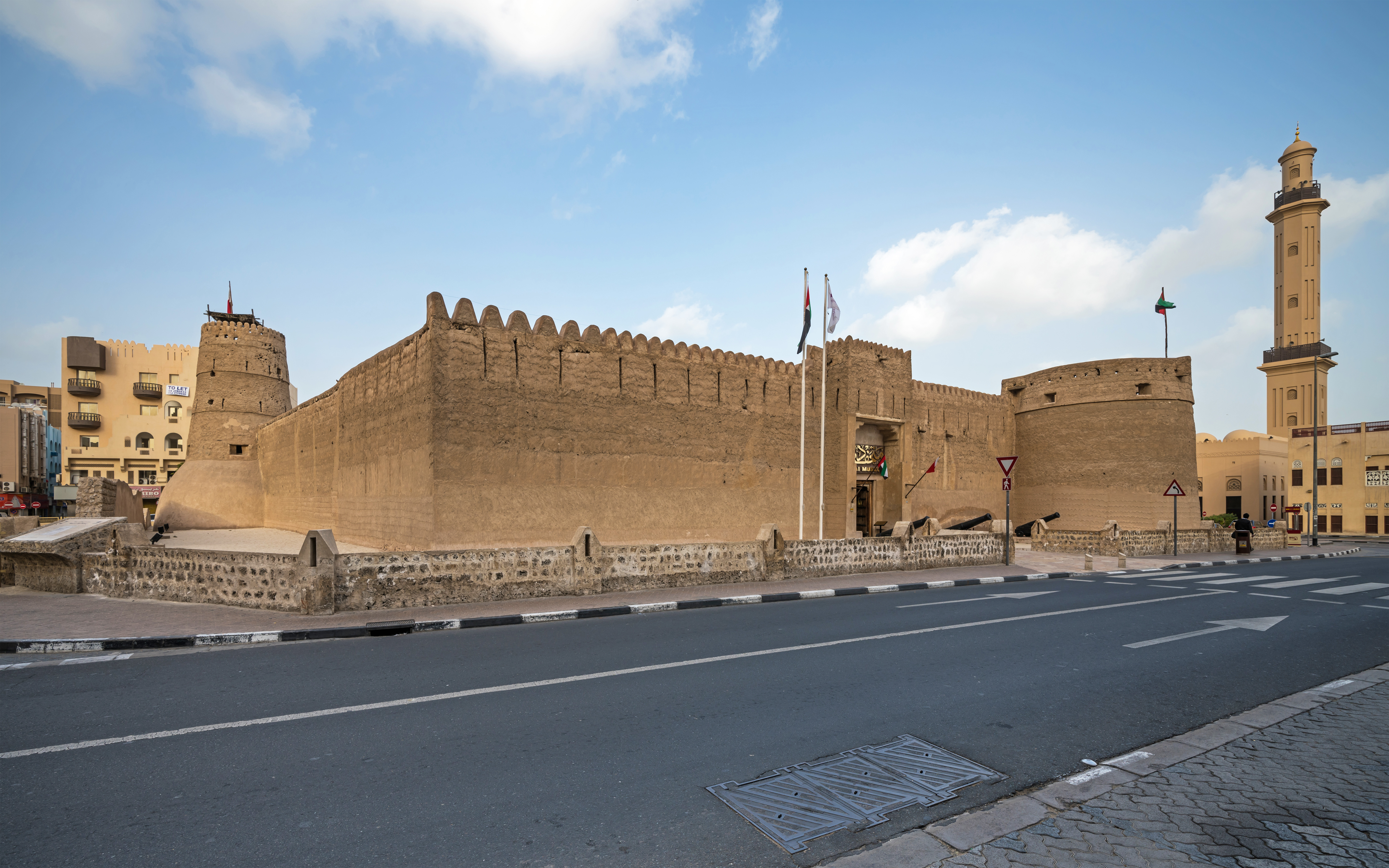

- Location within United Arab Emirates
- Established: 1971
- Location: Al Fahidi Fort, Dubai, UAE
- Coordinates: 25°15′47″N 55°17′50″E
- Type: Covers the archaeology and history of Dubai, and a historic site by itself
- Visitors: over 1 million (2013)
- Public transit access: Al Fahidi station, Dubai Metro

Dubai Museum (Arabic: متحف دبي) is the main museum in Dubai, United Arab Emirates. It is located in the Al Fahidi Fort (Arabic: حصن الفهيدي), built in 1787 and is the oldest existing building in Dubai.

The museum was opened by the Ruler of Dubai in 1971, with the aim of presenting the traditional way of life in the Emirate of Dubai. When entering, one can see the fort constructed and the various displays that go along with it. From the fort, there is a path to the galleries, which display the general culture of the land, especially in the 1800s. It includes local antiques as well as artifacts from African and Asian countries that traded with Dubai. It also includes several dioramas showing life in the emirate before the advent of oil, in addition to artifacts from recent discoveries as old as 3000 BC. The museum has displayed from pearl diving boats to swords and jewellery and a lovely close-to-life spice souk, which filled with real smells and actual spices. Besides the displays, the museum also includes hologram-like movies, and information stands that showcase lives and times of the Bedouin people from the third millennium B.C. till today.

In 2007, Dubai Museum received 1,800 visitors daily, with a yearly total of 611,840. In March 2008, the museum had 80,000 visitors. The most popular times are from August to April. The museum received over one million visitors in 2013. The total area of Dubai museum is 4,000 square meters.

== History ==
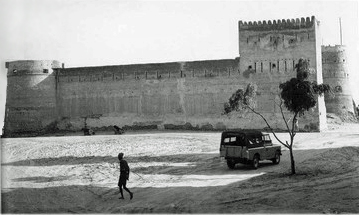
Al Fahidi Fort c. 1959

Al Fahidi Fort was constructed in several phases, beginning in 1787, to protect Dubai’s settlement along Dubai Creek from landward attack. The creek supported the town’s trading, fishing and pearling activities. The fort subsequently served as a residence for Dubai’s rulers, a seat of government, a prison and a weapons depot. It remained the seat of government until 1896 and later functioned as an administrative center and storehouse.

Preparations to convert the fort into a museum began in the late 1960s. In 1969, Dubai requested assistance from Kuwait in developing the museum. The fort opened as Dubai Museum in 1971 under the direction of Sheikh Rashid bin Saeed Al Maktoum.

=== Restoration and Reopening ===
A rehabilitation project for Al Fahidi Fort was launched in 2021 under Sheikh Hamdan bin Mohammed bin Rashid Al Maktoum. Overseen by Dubai Culture and Arts Authority, the project combined the conservation of the historic building with the redevelopment of its exhibitions and visitor facilities. On 26 February 2024, Sheikh Hamdan approved the project’s final design. The plans covered the museum’s content, architecture, exhibition design and branding, together with improvements to accessibility, surrounding public spaces, infrastructure and traffic management.

The restored museum reopened in November 2026. Partners in the project included the UAE Ministry of Defence, Dubai Municipality, the Roads and Transport Authority and Dubai’s Department of Economy and Tourism.

On 20 November 2026, Sheikh Mohammed bin Rashid Al Maktoum, Vice-President and Prime Minister of the United Arab Emirates and Ruler of Dubai, visited the restored museum with Sheikha Latifa bint Mohammed bin Rashid Al Maktoum, chairperson of Dubai Culture and Arts Authority. He toured the redeveloped galleries, including their archival and digital displays, and visited The Vault, an exhibition on the development of defense in Dubai and the United Arab Emirates.

== Fort ==
Al Fahidi Fort is square-shaped with towers occupying three of its corners. It was built of coral rock and mortar in several phases. Just off the southern wall lie a reconstruction of the old city walls. Next to them stands a tall dhow (traditional boat) in the middle of a large courtyard that covers the underground galleries. Two cannons guard the main gate to the fort on the eastern wall, adorned by flags of Dubai and the United Arab Emirates. The Fort served as the headquarters for the Ruler of the emirate and It was restored during the reign of the late Sheikh Rashid bin Saeed Al Maktoum.

Internal halls line three of the fort walls. One hall is at the main gate and houses the ticket office, while the others contain a collection of old weapons and arms from different historical periods along with a model of the city in 1820 AD. Traditional musical instruments are also displayed next to a video of folkloric music.

The halls surround a central courtyard. Here you will find a bronze cannon with cannonballs, a well, and various types of boats. In the corner stands a traditional summer house called Arish. The Arish is made entirely from weaved palm fronds. It comprises seating and sleeping areas as well as a kitchen, filled with household furnishings and objects used by the locals in past times. The Arish features the distinct wind tower design, used for air conditioning in the pre-electricity days.

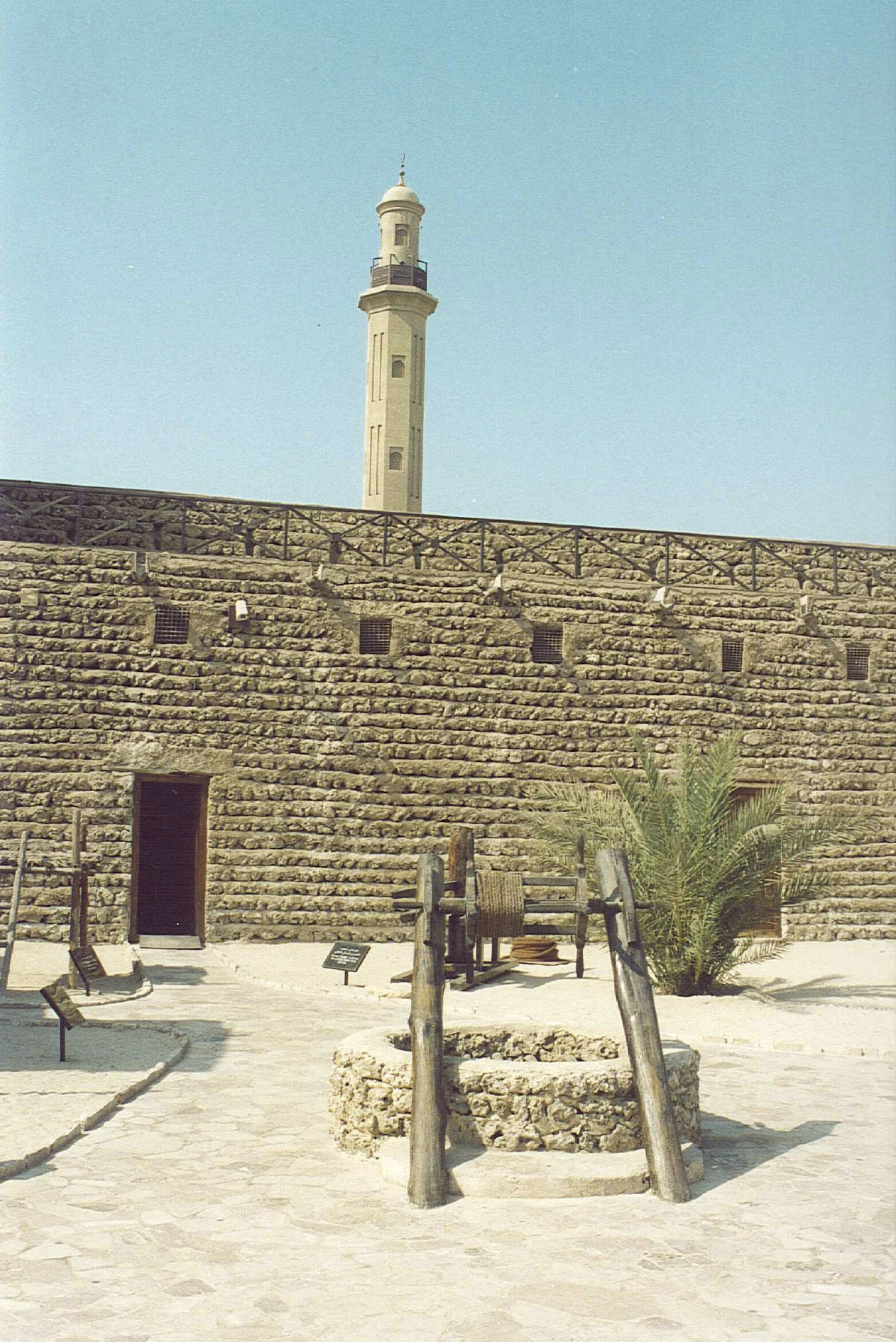
Courtyard of Al Fahidi Fort

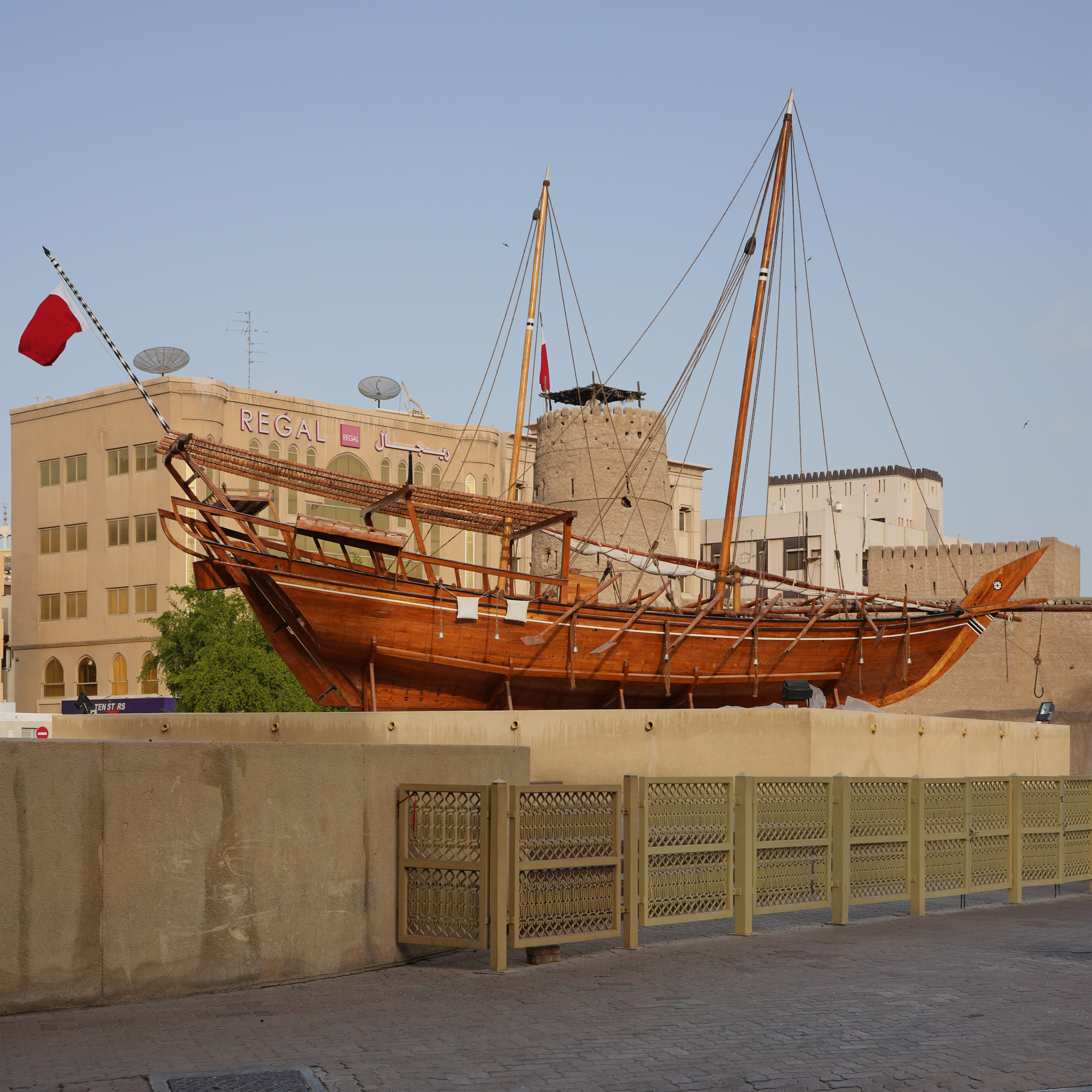
The dhow outside the museum

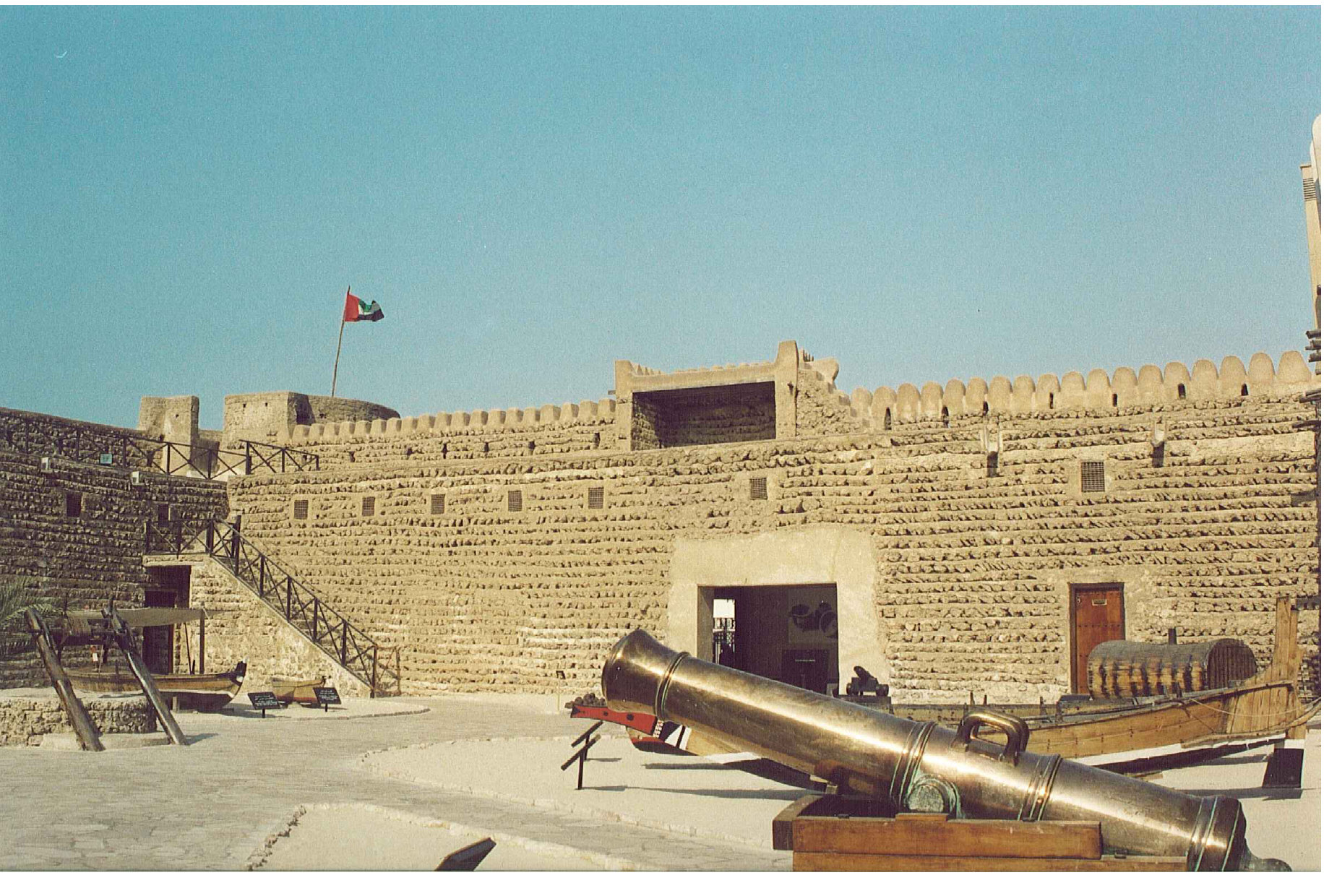
Courtyard of Al Fahidi Fort

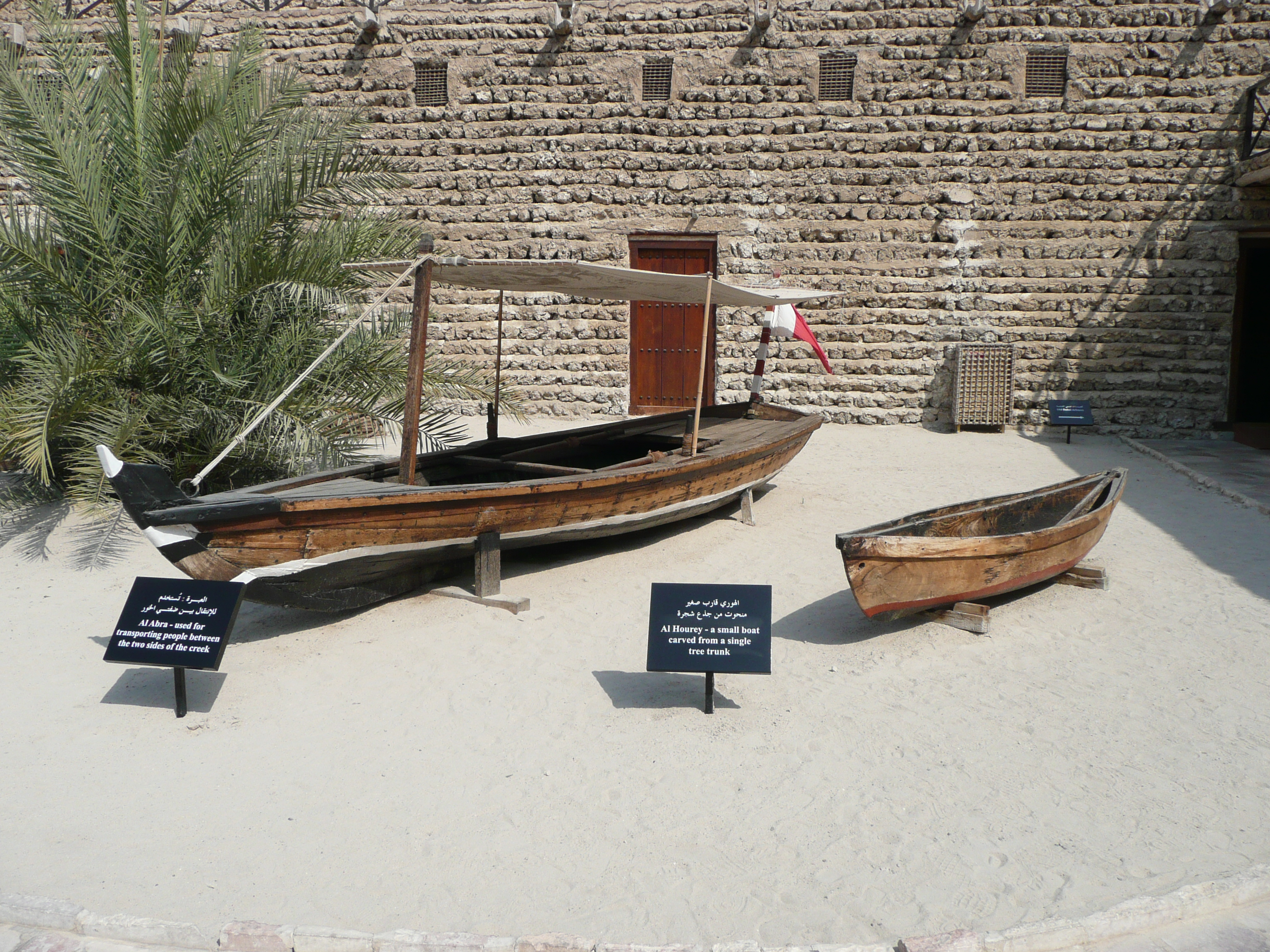
Al abra and al hourey exhibit at the Dubai Museum

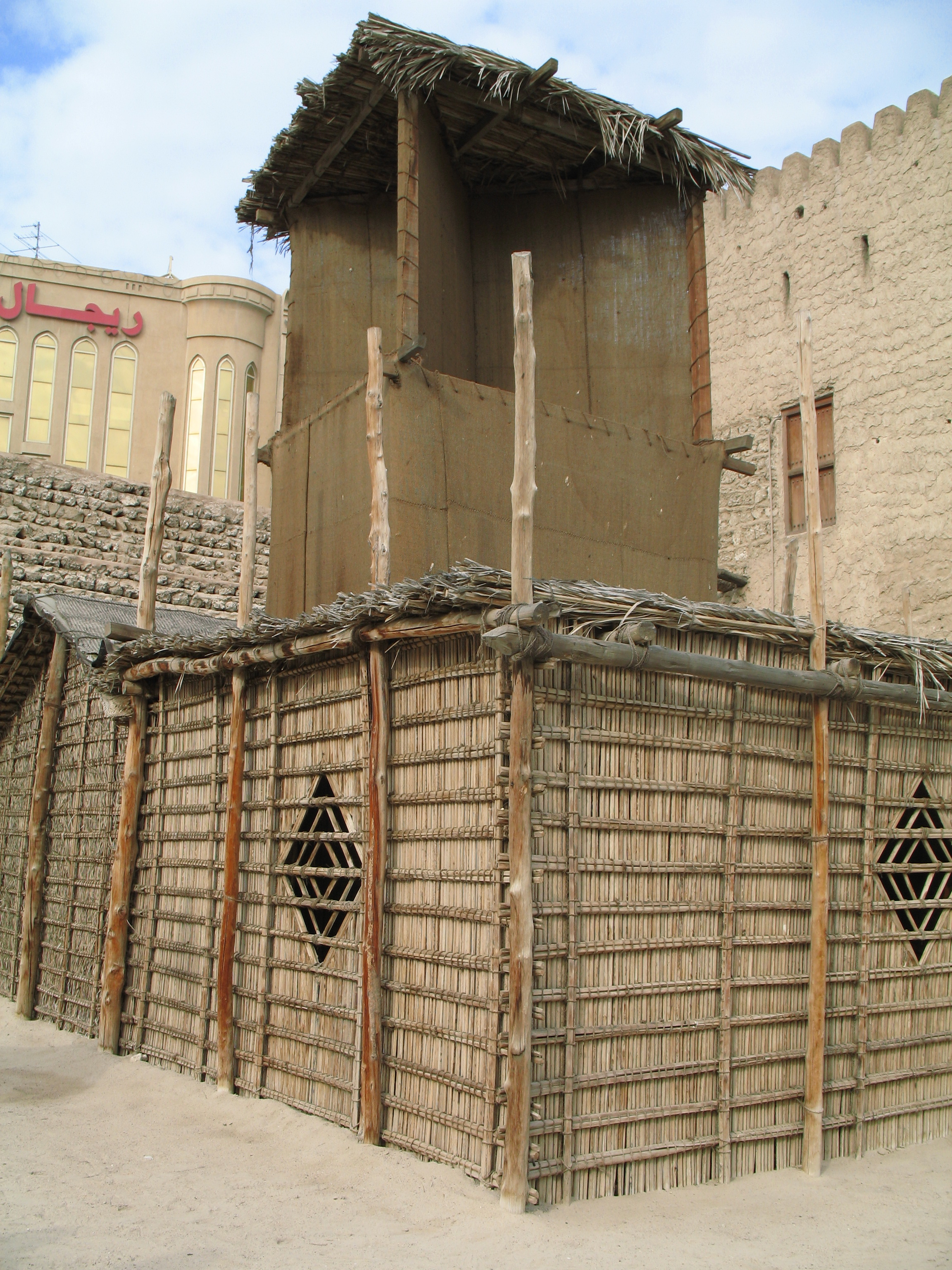
The arish with the wind tower

== Galleries ==
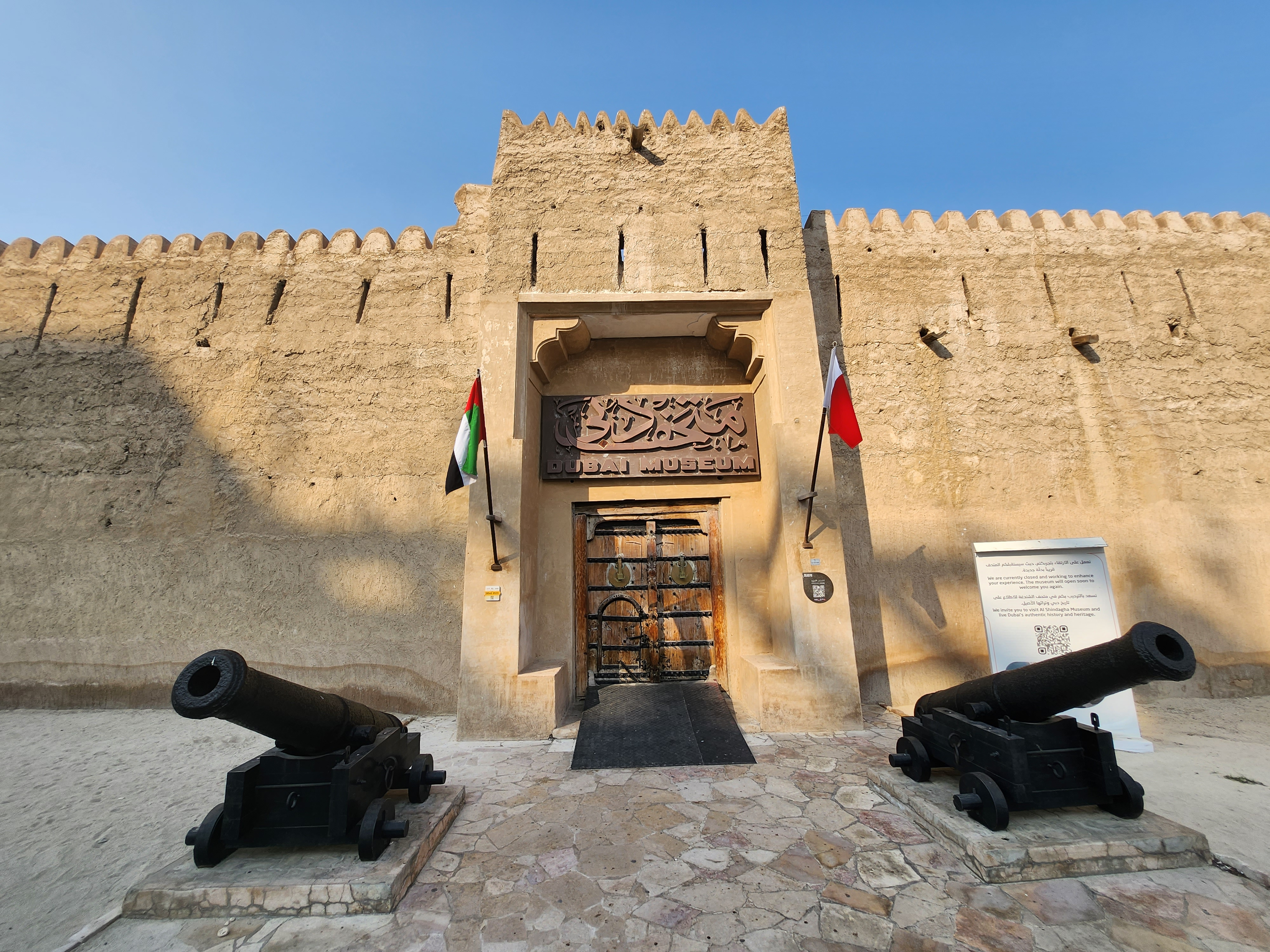
Dubai Museum entrance in 2023

Entrance to the galleries is located at the tower on the south-western corner of the fort. After descending the spiral stairs visitors enter the first gallery, where old maps of Dubai are displayed. Next is the video room, showing a video, updated in 2007, that depicts Dubai from before the discovery of oil in the 1960s to the current day. Below it there is a map that shows the urban scape of the city growing in sync with the timeline of the video.

Life-size dioramas of the pre-oil era await behind the next door. Once they enter, visitors will set foot on the deck of a dhow unloading at the model creek-side souq. Moving ahead they will see the shops filled with craftsmen, vendors and buyers. A tailor, a carpenter, an iron smith, a textile vendor and others line the street. Realistic sounds and life-size videos of craftsmen at work give the impression of a bustling souq.

The street leads to a model of a mosque, house and family, then turns to the right where it is surrounded by depictions of desert life with a date farm, a camel, wild animals, and a Bedouin tent filled with jewelry, trinkets and objects from the daily life of Bedouins. The walls tell about their knowledge of the stars and how they used it to guide their activities. Next is the largest diorama which is all about the sea, with a huge scene of the building of a dhow, scenes of marine life detailing local species, in addition to a collection of seafaring equipment. The last diorama features an archaeological site in Al Qusais area that goes back to 3000 BC. There are tombs, an excavated skeleton, and an archaeologist. All the way sounds, visual effects and electronic guides accompany the dioramas.

Cabinets filled with archaeological finds from Al Qusais site line the walls next to the excavation scene. Finally, the winding track leads to a gallery displaying finds from other sites and historical eras, like the Umayyad site at Jumeirah. The gift shop is the last stop before a spiral ramp takes you up to the museum's southern exit.

Replica food stall with vendor mannequin

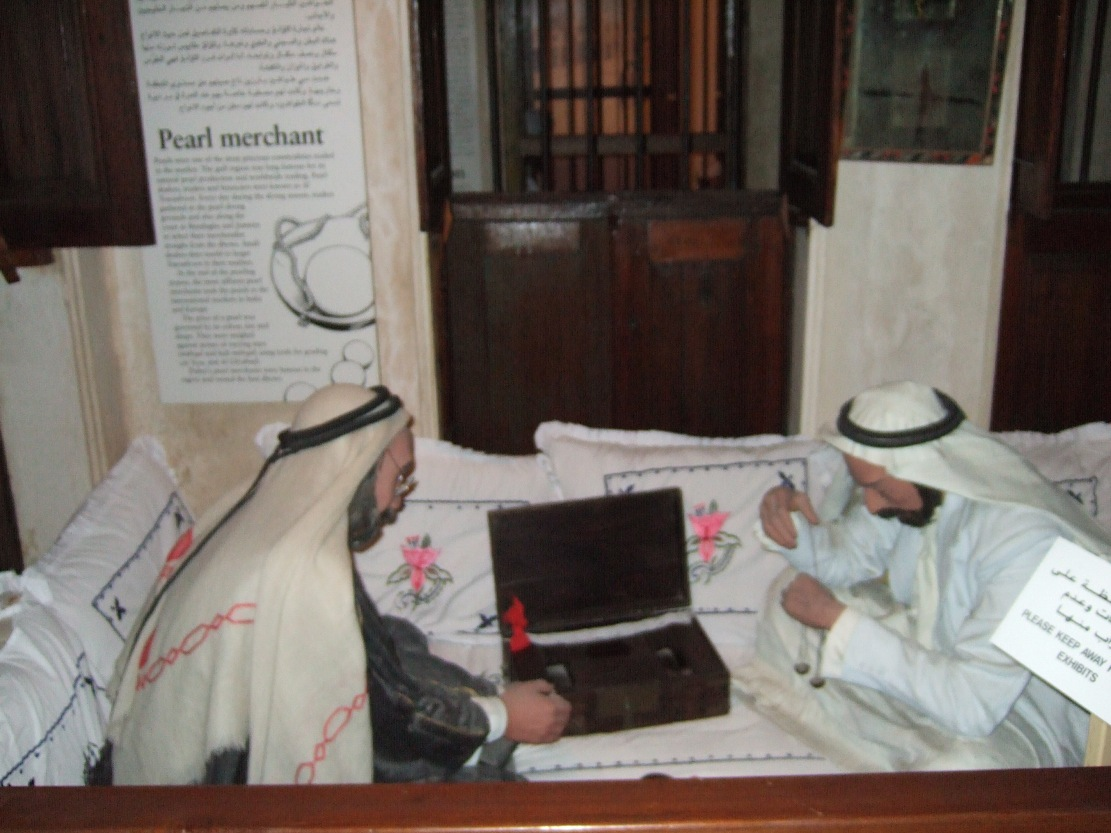
Pearl merchant mannequins

Gift shop at the Dubai Museum

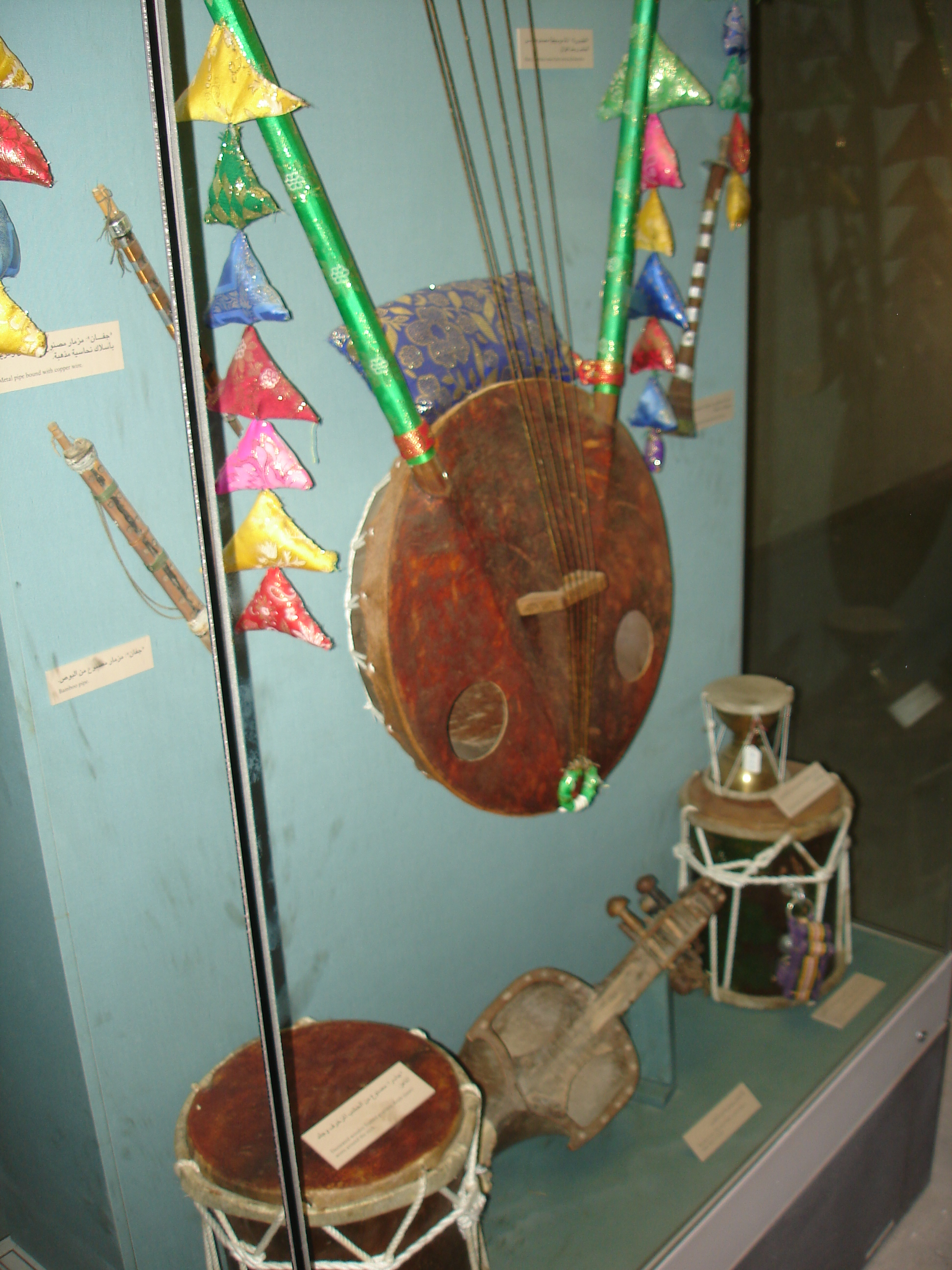
Musical instruments - double pipes, lyre, zurna, drums, gheychak, Dubai Museum

== Transport ==
Visitors can reach Dubai Museum by public buses through the Ghubaiba or Fahidi bus stations nearby or by metro station of the Ghubaiba or Fahidi which is also located nearby. Rented cars or tours operators also provide transportation services.

== Footnotes ==
Records
Unknown	Tallest building in Dubai; 1799 – 1973	Succeeded by Sheikh Rashid Building
