= Saeed bin Butti Al Maktoum =

- Sheikh

Ruler of Dubai
- Reign: 1852 – December 1859
- Predecessor: Maktoum bin Butti Al Maktoum
- Successor: Hasher bin Maktoum Al Maktoum
- Died: December 1859
Names
- Sheikh Saeed bin Butti bin Suhail Al Maktoum
- House: Al Maktoum
- Father: Butti bin Suhail Al Maktoum

Sheikh Saeed bin Butti Al Maktoum (Arabic: سعيد بن بطي) was the third Ruler of Dubai, succeeding Maktoum bin Butti Al Maktoum on his death in 1852. He was a signatory to the landmark treaty with the British, the Perpetual Maritime Truce of 1853.

== Accession ==
The brother of Maktoum, who died of natural causes, Saeed inherited a small but thriving coastal community. However, his rule was challenged by Maktoum bin Butti’s sons, Hasher and Suhail. When, in October 1852, Saeed travelled to Muscat to meet the Sultan, he left the town in the hands of his uncle, Saeed bin Rashid. The two young men took control of Dubai's Fahidi fort, capturing and imprisoning Saeed bin Rashid. However, Saeed bin Rashid not only escaped but was able to regain control of the town and the brothers fled to Sharjah, where they lived in exile.

Relations with both Sharjah and Ras Al Khaimah under Sultan bin Saqr Al Qasimi were fraught and Saeed bin Butti contracted alliances with Abu Dhabi and Umm Al Quwain against Sultan bin Saqr. Sultan bin Saqr had previously attacked the Omani town of Shinas, in March 1850, and been opposed by the Sultan of Muscat together with an army raised by Saeed bin Tahnun Al Nahyan of Abu Dhabi consisting of 400 Bani Yas and Manasir. Allied with Abu Dhabi in this conflict, Saeed bin Butti was able to recover Shinas and Sohar for Muscat, while Sultan bin Saqr Al Qasimi took Khor Fakkan and Kalba in the shamaliyah.

== Perpetual Maritime Truce ==
Dubai's burgeoning pearl fishing fleet competed with those of Abu Dhabi, Sharjah and the other coastal towns and annual treaties were made between the Rulers and the British to safeguard the various fleets during the pearling season. These treaties were signed between 1835 and 1843 and then superseded by a ten-year treaty signed in June 1843. This treaty, policed by the British, was generally agreed to have been successful and so the British political resident in Bushire, a Captain Kemball, proposed a permanent treaty.

In May 1853, Saeed was a signatory to this treaty, the "Perpetual Maritime Truce", which prohibited any act of aggression at sea by the subjects or dependants of the signatory Rulers. The truce was signed by Saeed Abdulla bin Rashid of Umm Al Quwain; Hamed bin Rashid of Ajman; Saeed bin Tahnoun ('Chief of the Beniyas') and Sultan bin Saqr ('Chief of the Joasmees'). The treaty effectively established a British protectorate on the Trucial Coast, the Rulers all agreeing to escalate any disputes or acts of aggression to the British Resident, who was resident in Sharjah, or the 'Commodore at Bassidore' and submit to their judgement.

A further engagement for the suppression of the slave trade was signed by Saeed and the other Trucial Rulers in 1856.

Despite agreeing treaties of maritime truce, the Trucial Rulers found relationships with the tribes of the interior often fractious and in 1857 men from the Sharjah dependency of Abu Hail attacked an encampment of Mazari (sing. Al Mazrouei) tribesmen at Khawaneej. In response to the raid, Saeed bin Butti, with the help of Abu Dhabi, defeated Sharjah and a peace was negotiated in March 1857 with the assistance of the British Resident Agent.

== Death ==
Saeed bin Butti died in December 1859 of smallpox, the disease which had killed his brother Maktoum and which also killed another brother and a nephew.

== See also ==
- Al Maktoum

Preceded by Maktoum bin Butti bin Suhail	Ruler of Dubai; 1852–1859	Succeeded by Hasher bin Maktoum
