= Rashid bin Maktoum Al Maktoum =

- Sheikh

Ruler of Dubai
- Reign: November 22, 1886 – April 7, 1894
- Predecessor: Hasher bin Maktoum Al Maktoum
- Successor: Maktoum bin Hasher Al Maktoum
- Died: 7 April 1894
- Issue: Buti bin Rashid Al Maktoum; Saeed bin Rashid Al Maktoum
Names
- Sheikh Rashid bin Maktoum bin Butti bin Suhail Al Maktoum
- House: Al Maktoum
- Father: Maktoum bin Butti Al Maktoum

Sheikh Rashid bin Maktoum Al Maktoum was the Ruler of Dubai from 1886 to 1894.

Hasher bin Maktoum died on 22 November 1886 without leaving a clear line of succession, causing a rift in the family with two contenders for the title being put forward: Sheikh Maktoum bin Hasher, Hasher's eldest son and Sheikh Rashid bin Maktoum, Hasher's brother.

Sheikh Rashid gained the support of the majority of the family and tribal leaders and acceded in 1886, continuing the policies of open trade and conciliation established by Hasher. He was an influential ruler and when he was approached by Sheikh Zayed of Abu Dhabi for assistance during a conflict over Buraimi in 1891, he was able to muster a considerable force of 300 camel riders and 30 horsemen in Zayed's support.

Rashid inherited the ongoing conflict with the Rulers of the emirates to the North and conflict was rarely absent from the coast, with raids and ruptures an almost constant occurrence, particularly in 1889 and 1890. In 1891, some 400 men of the Marar tribe, considering themselves ill-treated by Rashid, ended the pearling season by sailing their boats to Sharjah. This action led to three years of bitter negotiations, arbitrated by the British Resident, settling financial claims and counter claims which led to a number of conflicts on land.

== Exclusive Agreement ==
An odd approach to the Trucial Rulers was to result in the 1892 Exclusive Agreement, which formalised the British protectorate over the Trucial States and established the principle that the Trucial rulers would not enter into negotiations or relations with any other government than Britain. In 1887, Sartip Haji Ahmad Khan, the former deputy governor of Bushire, landed in Abu Dhabi in August wearing full dress uniform. Travelling from Abu Dhabi to Dubai, the Sartip held secret meetings with the Trucial rulers and it was Rashid bin Maktoum who eventually confided to Turki bin Said, the Sultan of Muscat, that Ahmad Khan had proposed an alliance with the Trucial rulers to eject the British.

The British Political Resident at Bushire, Edward Charles Ross, moved quickly on receipt of this information and in December 1887 secured agreement from the rulers of Abu Dhabi, Dubai, Sharjah, Ajman, Umm Al Quwain and Ras Al Khaimah that they would not have dealings with any other government than the British and not allow any other government’s agent to reside in their territories.

This was formalised in 1892, and Rashid was signatory to the 'Exclusive Agreement', which bound the Trucial Rulers not to enter into 'any agreement or correspondence with any Power other than the British Government' and that without British assent, they would not 'consent to the residence within my territory of the agent of any other government' and that they would not 'cede, sell, mortgage or otherwise give for occupation any part of my territory, save to the British Government.

Also in 1892, in March, a number of Dubai subjects ejected a number of Al Qasimi dependents from Sir Bu Nair Island - resulting in a censure from the British Agent, requiring the aggressors to withdraw and return the arms they captured, as well as Rashid having to undertake his subjects would not in future travel to Sir Bu Nair without permission from the Sheikh of Sharjah.

In September 1892, Rashid married into the Al Bu Shamis subsection of the Na'im tribe in Buraimi. He died on 7 April 1894 during a major cholera outbreak in Dubai, although the cause of his death was described as a 'paralytic seizure'.

== See also ==
- Al Maktoum

Preceded by Hasher bin Maktoum	Ruler of Dubai; 1886–1894	Succeeded by Maktoum bin Hasher Al Maktoum
