= House of Maktoum =

Royal family in the United Arab Emirates

House of Maktoum آل مكتوم
- Royal house
- Parent house: Bani Yas; House of Al Falasi
- Country: United Arab Emirates
- Founded: 9 July 1833; 193 years ago
- Founder: Maktoum bin Butti Al Maktoum
- Current head: Mohammed bin Rashid Al Maktoum
- Titles: Vice President of the United Arab Emirates; Prime Minister of the United Arab Emirates; Deputy Prime Minister of the United Arab Emirates; Emir of Dubai; Crown Prince of Dubai; Deputy Ruler of Dubai
- Style: His Highness Sheikh
- Connected families: House of Nahyan

The House of Maktoum (Arabic: آل مكتوم, romanized: Āl Maktūm) is the ruling royal family of the Emirate of Dubai, and one of the six ruling families of the United Arab Emirates. The family is a branch of the Bani Yas clan (a lineage the family shares with the Al Nahyan dynasty of Abu Dhabi), a tribal federation that was the dominant power through the region that now forms the United Arab Emirates.

== History ==
In 1833, about 800 members of the Bani Yas tribe, under the joint leadership of Sheikh Maktoum bin Butti and Obeid bin Said, took over the emirate of Dubai. After Obeid bin Said died of old age in 1836, Maktoum bin Butti took the reins as the sole ruler and established the Al Maktoum dynasty in the emirate.

The Al Maktoum dynasty has ruled Dubai since 1833. Within the federation of the United Arab Emirates, the Federal Supreme Council consists of the individual rulers of the seven emirates. The president and vice-president are elected by the Supreme Council every five years.

The presidency, although unofficial, is de facto hereditary to the Al Nahyan clan of Emirate of Abu Dhabi and the Prime Minister, Vice President and Minister of Defence post de facto is hereditary to the Al Maktoum clan of Dubai.

== Genealogy ==
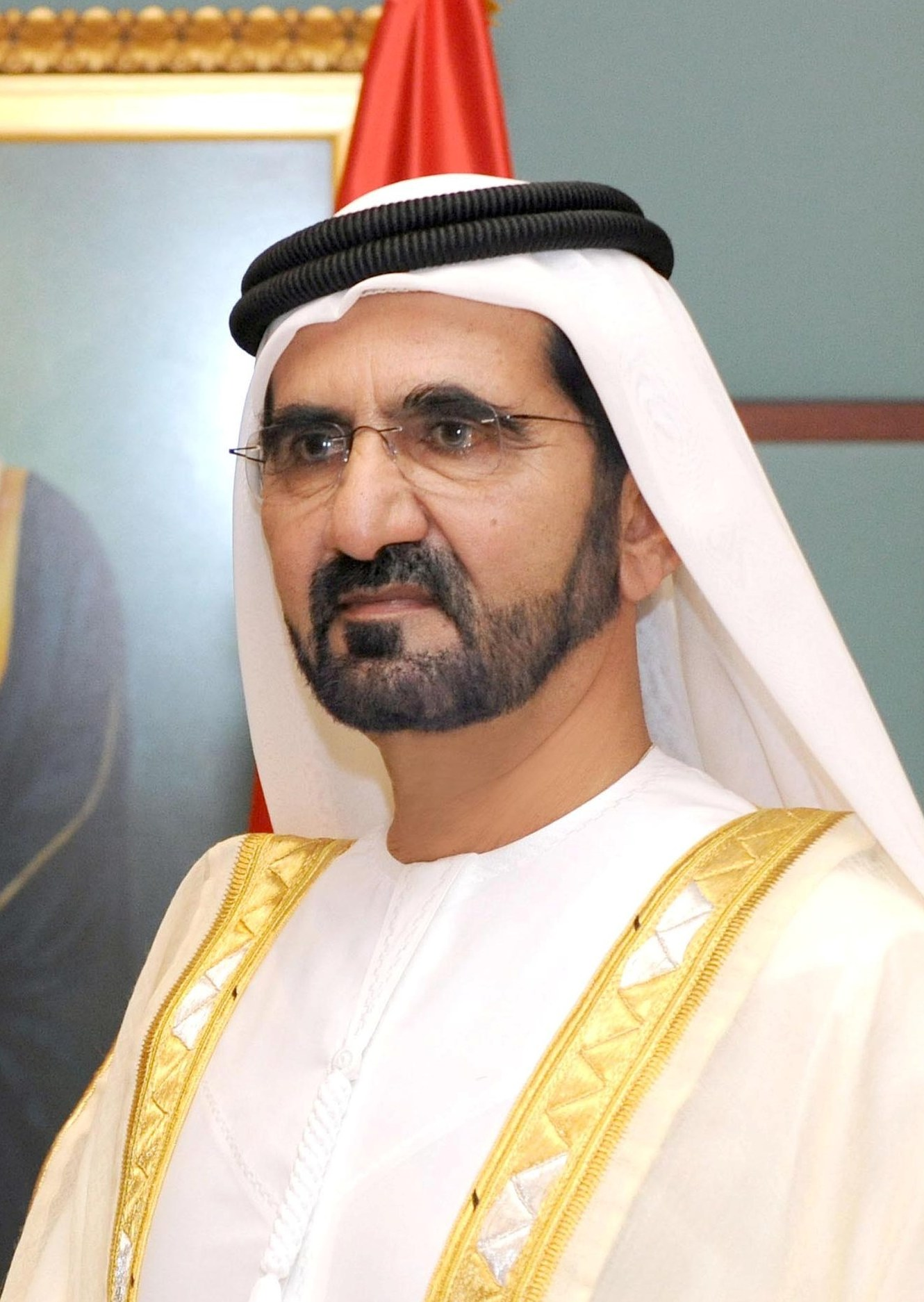
The current head of the family, Sheikh Mohammed bin Rashid Al Maktoum

Vice President
Prime Minister
Current Emir of Dubai
Previous Emir of Dubai

Butti bin Suhail; Al Maktoum
Maktoum bin Butti^{(1)} r. 1833–1852	Saeed bin Butti^{(2)} r. 1852–1859
Hasher bin Maktoum^{(3)} r. 1859–1886	Rashid bin Maktoum^{(4)} r. 1886–1894	Suhail bin Maktoum; Al Maktoum
Maktoum bin Hasher^{(5)} r. 1894–1906	Butti bin Suhail^{(6)} r. 1906–1912
Saeed bin Maktoum^{(7)} r. 1912–1958	Juma bin Maktoum; Al Maktoum
Rashid bin Saeed^{(8)} r. 1958–1990^{(1)} r. 1971–1990 r. 1979–1990	Maktoum bin Juma; Al Maktoum	Thani bin Juma; Al Maktoum
House of Sharqi
Maktoum bin Rashid^{(9)} r. 1990–2006^{(2)} r. 1990–2006 r. 1971–1979, 1990–2006	Mohammed bin Rashid^{(10)} r. 2006–present^{(3)} r. 2006–present r. 2006–present	Hind bint Maktoum; Al Maktoum	Fatima bint Thani; Al Maktoum	Hamad bin Mohammed; Fujairah^{(4)} r. 1974–present
Hamdan bin Mohammed; Al Maktoum

== Rulers ==
The following Al Maktoum family members have ruled Dubai:

Name	Lifespan	Reign start	Reign end	Notes	Family	Image
Maktoum bin Butti bin Suhail: مكتوم بن بطي	Unknown – 1852	9 July 1833	1852 (death by smallpox)	Joint founder of the Al Maktoum clan and first ruler of Dubai, alongside Obeid bin Said bin Rashid	House of Maktoum	
Saeed bin Butti: سعيد بن بطي	Unknown – December 1859	1852	December 1859 (death by smallpox)	Brother of Maktoum bin Butti bin Suhail	House of Maktoum	
Hasher bin Maktoum bin Butti Al Maktoum: حشر بن مكتوم بن بطي آل مكتوم	Unknown – 22 November 1886	December 1859	22 November 1886 (death by natural causes)	Nephew of Saeed bin Butti	House of Maktoum	
Rashid bin Maktoum: راشد بن مكتوم	Unknown – 7 April 1894	22 November 1886	7 April 1894 (death by paralytic seizure)	Brother of Hasher bin Maktoum bin Butti Al Maktoum	House of Maktoum	
Maktoum bin Hasher Al Maktoum: مكتوم بن حشر آل مكتوم	Unknown – 16 February 1906	7 April 1894	16 February 1906 (death by heart disease)	Nephew of Rashid bin Maktoum	House of Maktoum	
Butti bin Suhail Al Maktoum: ٱلشَّيْخ بُطِّي بِن سُهَيْل آل مَكْتُوْم	1850 – 29 November 1912	16 February 1906	29 November 1912 (death by natural causes)	Cousin of Maktoum bin Hasher Al Maktoum	House of Maktoum	
Saeed bin Maktoum bin Hasher Al Maktoum: سعيد بن مكتوم آل مكتوم	1878 – 9 September 1958	29 November 1912	9 September 1958 (death by natural causes)	Son of Maktoum bin Hasher Al Maktoum	House of Maktoum	
Rashid bin Saeed Al Maktoum: راشد بن سعيد آل مكتوم	11 June 1912 – 7 October 1990	9 September 1958	7 October 1990 (death by natural causes)	Son of Saeed bin Maktoum bin Hasher Al Maktoum and one of the founders of the United Arab Emirates in 1971	House of Maktoum	
Maktoum bin Rashid Al Maktoum: مكتوم بن راشد آل مكتوم	15 August 1943 – 4 January 2006	7 October 1990	4 January 2006 (death by heart attack)	Son of Rashid bin Saeed Al Maktoum	House of Maktoum	
Mohammed bin Rashid Al Maktoum: مُحَمَّد بن رَاشِد آل مَكتُوم	15 July 1949 – current	4 January 2006	Incumbent	Son of Rashid bin Saeed Al Maktoum. Current Ruler of Dubai, Vice President, Prime Minister and Minister of Defence of the United Arab Emirates	House of Maktoum	

== Assets ==
Among its other vast assets, the Al Maktoum family owns Godolphin, a private Thoroughbred horseracing stable.

== Controversy ==
In 2001, Sheikha Shamsa bint Mohammed Al Maktoum alleged that she was kidnapped off the streets of Cambridge by her father Sheikh Mohammed bin Rashid Al Maktoum’s men.

Sheikha Latifa bint Mohammed Al Maktoum also alleged that she was kidnapped off the coast of India on the orders of her father. She has stated that she was detained under police guard in Dubai. The actions taken against the princesses was allegedly motivated by a desire to protect the reputation of the Al Maktoum family.

On 29 June 2019, The Sun reported that the wife of Sheikh Mohammed, Princess Haya bint Al Hussein, had fled Dubai and was in Germany seeking political asylum along with her children son and daughter. The cause of the departure was unknown, despite a poem reportedly composed by Dubai’s ruler alluding to betrayal. On 30 July 2019 at the High Court, she filed for the sole custody of their two children, for a forced marriage protection order (FMPO), a non-molestation order, and non-repatriation to Dubai.

In December 2019, a UK family court ruled that on the balance of probabilities Sheikh Mohammed had orchestrated the abductions of Sheikha Latifa and Sheikha Shamsa and that he continued to maintain a regime whereby both were deprived of their liberty, and had subjected his former wife, Princess Haya, to a campaign of "intimidation"; the findings were published in March 2020.

== See also ==
- House of Nahyan
- House of Al Falasi
- Government of Dubai
