= Ruler of Dubai =

Head of the Emirate of Dubai

Ruler of the Emirate of Dubai
- حاكم دبي
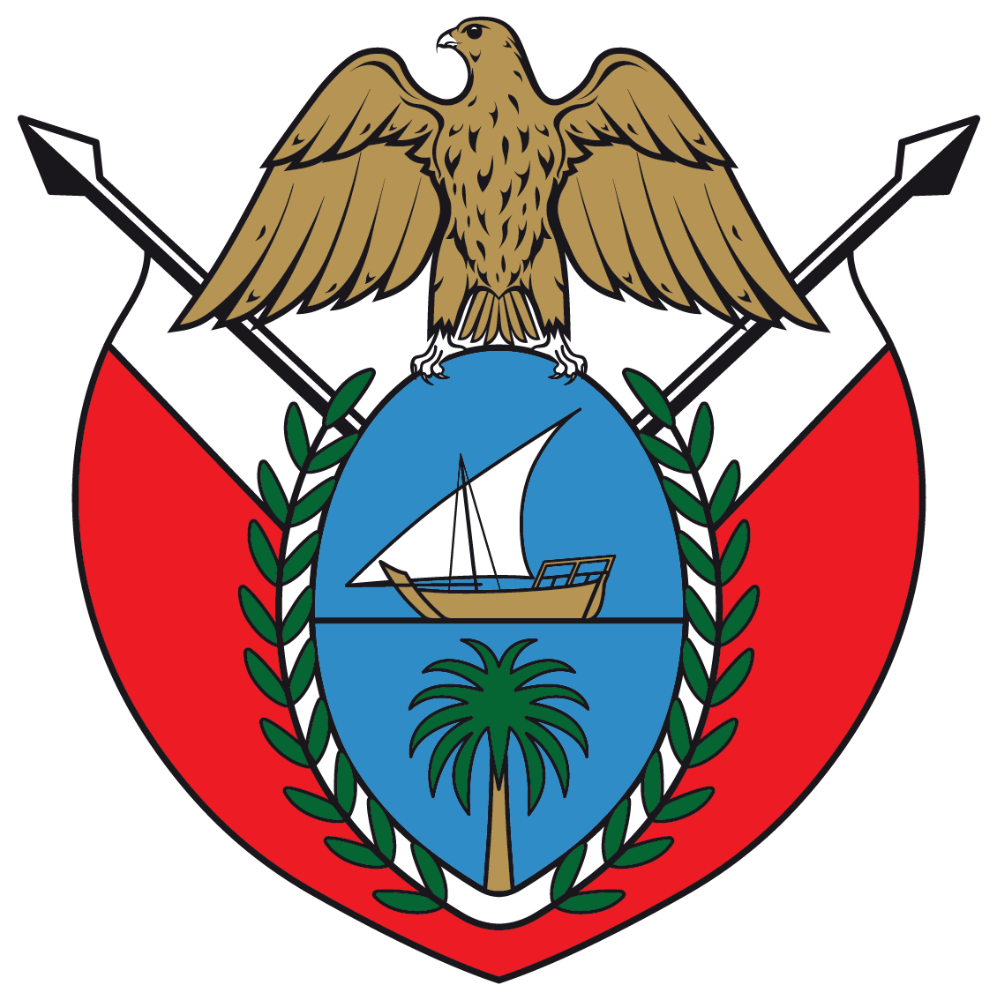
- Royal coats of arms

Incumbent
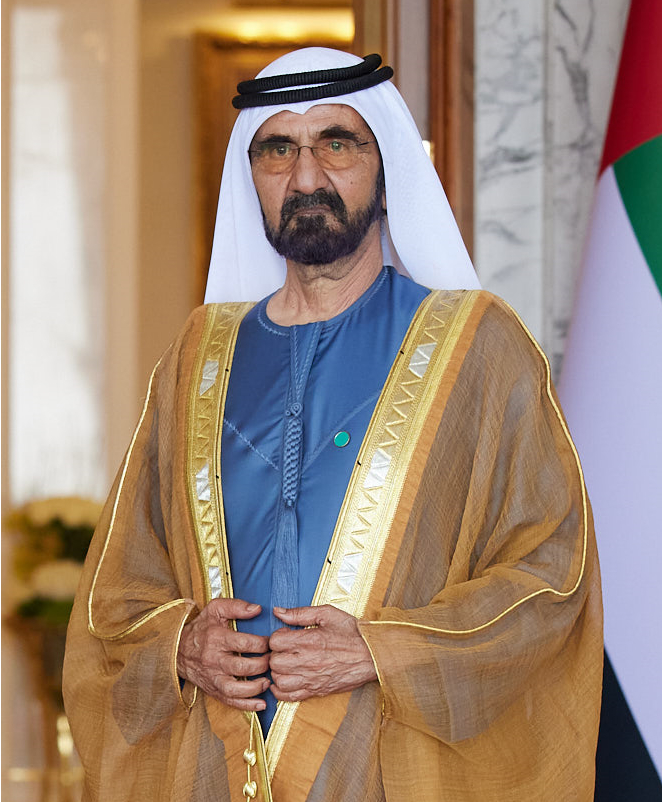
- Mohammed bin Rashid Al Maktoum since 4 January 2006

Details
- Style: His Highness
- Heir apparent: Hamdan bin Mohammed Al Maktoum
- First monarch: Maktoum bin Butti Al Maktoum
- Website: sheikhmohammed.ae

The ruler of Dubai (Arabic: حاكم دبي) is the position of the hereditary monarch and head of government of the Emirate of Dubai. The Ruler is also considered the head of the House of Maktoum, the royal family of Dubai and one of the six ruling families of the UAE. After the unification of the Emirate of Dubai within the United Arab Emirates, the Ruler of Dubai nominally assumes the position of Vice President and Prime Minister of the United Arab Emirates and sits at the seat reserved for Dubai at the Federal Supreme Council.

== History ==
In 1833, a migrating offshoot of the ruling Bani Yas tribe of Abu Dhabi settled to the small fishing village of Bur Dubai where Sheikh Maktoum bin Butti bin Suhail become the sole Ruler of Dubai by 1836, establishing the Al Maktoum dynasty. The relatively small Dubai relied on fishing, pearling, and foreign trade between the much larger Al Nahyan dynasty in Abu Dhabi and the Al Qasimi dynasty of Sharjah and establishing good relations with British forces which eventually culminated in the signing of an agreement with the British in 1892 to exclusively deal with the British Empire on all economic and foreign relation matters as part of the Trucial States. Following the withdrawal of the United Kingdom in 1971, then-Ruler of Dubai Sheikh Rashid bin Saeed Al Maktoum joined with other ruling families of the former Trucial States to form the United Arab Emirates, where the position of Ruler of Dubai has retained significant autonomy from the federal government of the UAE with control of the emirate's judiciary, executive and legislative.

== Functions and authority ==
The Ruler of Dubai is the head of the Emirate, and head of the executive in the form of the Government of Dubai, which also runs a judiciary independent from the federal judiciary of the UAE appointed and overseen by the Ruler. The Ruler of Dubai issues royal decrees to establish laws that do not contradict with the UAE Constitution, establish, merge, or dissolve Dubai Government departments, and appoint any key position across the Emirate of Dubai, including members of the Dubai judicial system and members of the Dubai Executive Council, the legislative arm of the Emirate of Dubai.

As part of the complex relationship between the ruling Al Maktoum family and private companies directly or indirectly controlled by the Dubai Government, or members of the ruling family, the Ruler of Dubai has extensive authority and influence over major companies in the Emirate.

== Rulers of Dubai (1833–present) ==
The rulers of the Emirates of Dubai:

Name	Lifespan	Reign start	Reign end	Notes	Family	Image
Obeid bin Said bin Rashid	Unknown – 1836	9 July 1833	1836 (death by natural causes)	Joint first ruler of Dubai, alongside Maktoum bin Butti bin Suhail		
Maktoum bin Butti bin Suhail: مكتوم بن بطي	Unknown – 1852	9 July 1833	1852 (death by smallpox)	Joint founder of the Al Maktoum clan and first ruler of Dubai, alongside Obeid bin Said bin Rashid	House of Maktoum	
Saeed bin Butti: سعيد بن بطي	Unknown – December 1859	1852	December 1859 (death by smallpox)	Brother of Maktoum bin Butti bin Suhail	House of Maktoum	
Hasher bin Maktoum bin Butti Al Maktoum: حشر بن مكتوم بن بطي آل مكتوم	Unknown – 22 November 1886	December 1859	22 November 1886 (death by natural causes)	Nephew of Saeed bin Butti	House of Maktoum	
Rashid bin Maktoum: راشد بن مكتوم	Unknown – 7 April 1894	22 November 1886	7 April 1894 (death by paralytic seizure)	Brother of Hasher bin Maktoum bin Butti Al Maktoum	House of Maktoum	
Maktoum bin Hasher Al Maktoum: مكتوم بن حشر آل مكتوم	Unknown – 16 February 1906	7 April 1894	16 February 1906 (death by heart disease)	Nephew of Rashid bin Maktoum	House of Maktoum	
Butti bin Suhail Al Maktoum: ٱلشَّيْخ بُطِّي بِن سُهَيْل آل مَكْتُوْم	1850 – 29 November 1912	16 February 1906	29 November 1912 (death by natural causes)	Cousin of Maktoum bin Hasher Al Maktoum	House of Maktoum	
Saeed bin Maktoum bin Hasher Al Maktoum: سعيد بن مكتوم آل مكتوم	1878 – 9 September 1958	29 November 1912	9 September 1958 (death by natural causes)	Son of Maktoum bin Hasher Al Maktoum	House of Maktoum	
Rashid bin Saeed Al Maktoum: راشد بن سعيد آل مكتوم	11 June 1912 – 7 October 1990	9 September 1958	7 October 1990 (death by natural causes)	Son of Saeed bin Maktoum bin Hasher Al Maktoum and one of the founders of the United Arab Emirates in 1971	House of Maktoum	
Maktoum bin Rashid Al Maktoum: مكتوم بن راشد آل مكتوم	15 August 1943 – 4 January 2006	7 October 1990	4 January 2006 (death by heart attack)	Son of Rashid bin Saeed Al Maktoum	House of Maktoum	
Mohammed bin Rashid Al Maktoum: مُحَمَّد بن رَاشِد آل مَكتُوم	15 July 1949 – current	4 January 2006	Incumbent	Son of Rashid bin Saeed Al Maktoum. Current Ruler of Dubai, Vice President, Prime Minister and Minister of Defence of the United Arab Emirates	House of Maktoum	

== Genealogy ==
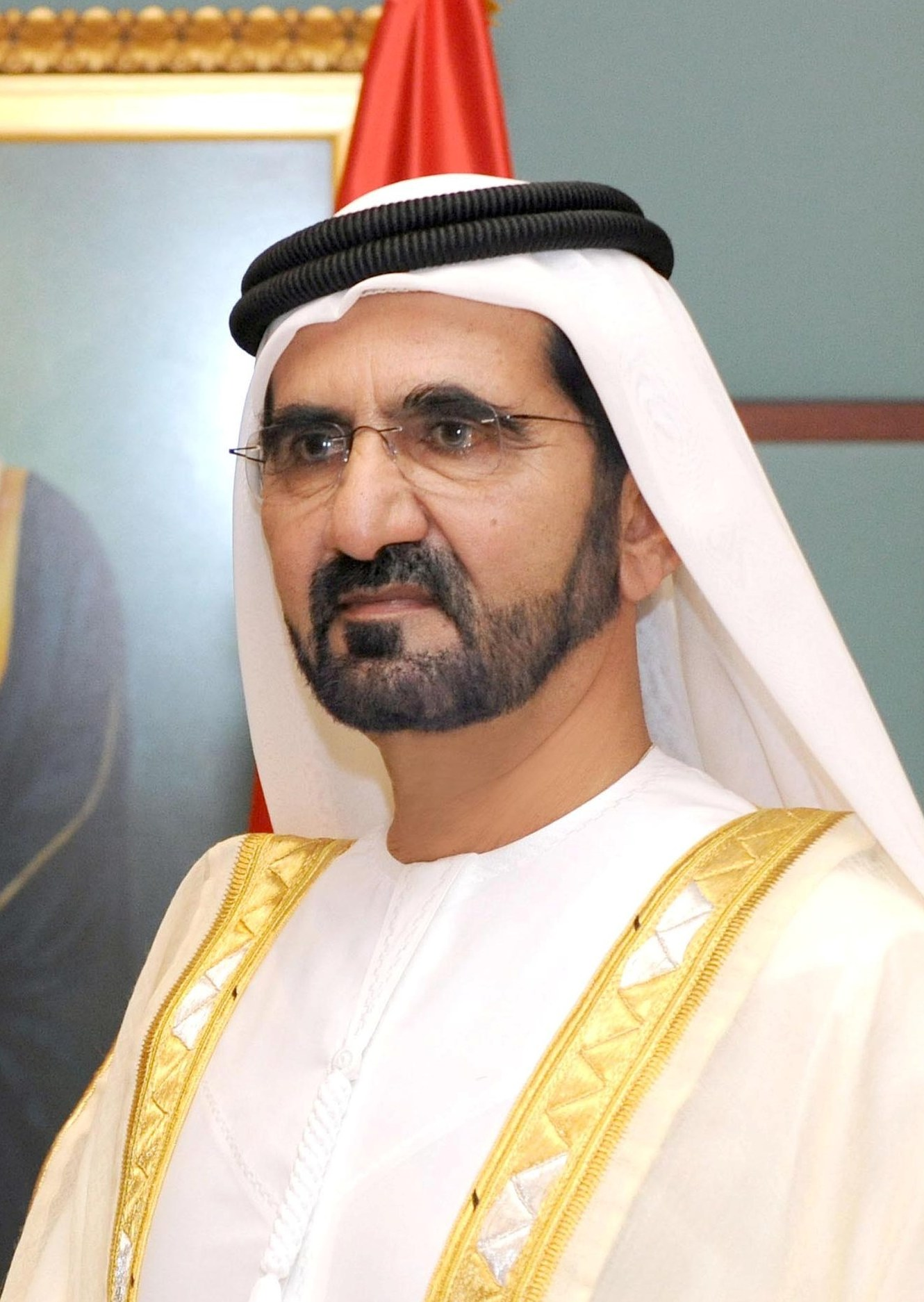
The current head of the family, Sheikh Mohammed bin Rashid Al Maktoum

Vice President
Prime Minister
Current Emir of Dubai
Previous Emir of Dubai

Butti bin Suhail; Al Maktoum
Maktoum bin Butti^{(1)} r. 1833–1852	Saeed bin Butti^{(2)} r. 1852–1859
Hasher bin Maktoum^{(3)} r. 1859–1886	Rashid bin Maktoum^{(4)} r. 1886–1894	Suhail bin Maktoum; Al Maktoum
Maktoum bin Hasher^{(5)} r. 1894–1906	Butti bin Suhail^{(6)} r. 1906–1912
Saeed bin Maktoum^{(7)} r. 1912–1958	Juma bin Maktoum; Al Maktoum
Rashid bin Saeed^{(8)} r. 1958–1990^{(1)} r. 1971–1990 r. 1979–1990	Maktoum bin Juma; Al Maktoum	Thani bin Juma; Al Maktoum
House of Sharqi
Maktoum bin Rashid^{(9)} r. 1990–2006^{(2)} r. 1990–2006 r. 1971–1979, 1990–2006	Mohammed bin Rashid^{(10)} r. 2006–present^{(3)} r. 2006–present r. 2006–present	Hind bint Maktoum; Al Maktoum	Fatima bint Thani; Al Maktoum	Hamad bin Mohammed; Fujairah^{(4)} r. 1974–present
Hamdan bin Mohammed; Al Maktoum

== See also ==
- House of Maktoum, the ruling family of Dubai
- Dubai Government
