= Emirate of Umm Al Quwain =

Emirate, one of the constituents of the United Arab Emirates

Umm Al Quwain إِمَارَة أُمّ ٱلْقَيْوين
- Emirate
- Flag Coat of arms

- Location of Umm Al Quwain in the UAE
- Interactive map of Umm Al Quwain
- Coordinates: 25°33′11″N 55°33′24″E
- Country: United Arab Emirates
- Seat: Umm Al Quwain

Government
  - Type: Islamic absolute monarchy within a federation
  - Ruler: Saud bin Rashid Al Mualla
  - Crown Prince: Rashid bin Saud bin Rashid Al Mualla

Area
  - Metro: 755 km^{2} (292 sq mi)
  - Rank: 6th

Population (2007)
  - Rank: 7th
  - Metro: 72,000

GDP
  - Total: US$ 0.7 billion (2023)
  - Per capita: US$ 7,700 (2023)
- Time zone: UTC+4 (UAE Standard Time)

The Emirate of Umm Al Quwain (UAQ; Arabic: أم القيوين; pronounced [ʔumː alqejˈwejn]) is one of the seven constituent emirates of the United Arab Emirates, located in the north of the country. It is the least populous and second smallest emirate in the UAE and borders the Persian Gulf. Umm Al Quwain lies between Ras Al Khaimah and Sharjah/Ajman on the west coast. It has a coastline stretching to 24 km (15 miles). It had 72,000 inhabitants in 2007 and has an area of 770 km^{2} (300 sq mi).

The Emirate of Umm Al Quwain was formed in 1775, when Sheikh Majid Al Mualla established it as an independent sheikhdom. The emirate is now ruled by Saud bin Rashid Al Mualla. The current crown prince is Rashid bin Saud bin Rashid Al Mualla, and the deputy ruler is H. H. Sheikh Ahmed bin Saud bin Rashid Al Mualla.

The emirate consists in the main of the coastal city of Umm Al Quwain and the inland oasis town of Falaj Al Mualla, some 30 km (19 miles) from the coast. The Population of the Emirate is 49,159 according to the census of December 2005. The city of Umm Al Quwain is the capital of the Emirate.

Unlike some of its neighbours, Umm Al Quwain has not made any significant find of oil or gas in its territory and depends on revenue from hotels, parks and tourism, fisheries and general trading activities as well as the Umm Al Quwain Free Zone (UAQFTZ) based at Port Ahmed Bin Rashid.

A number of government initiatives and strategies have been put in place to incentivise growth in trade and industrial activity in the emirate, including a 2018 move to reduce government fees to business and waive fines and violations levied against businesses which had not renewed their trade licenses.

== Etymology ==
Umm Al Quwain's name is derived from the Arabic for "mother of the two powers", those being the wealth of resources derived from the land and sea.

== History and prehistory ==
The Emirate of Umm Al Quwain holds significant archaeological interest, with major finds at both Tell Abraq and Ed-Dur pointing to significant ancient Near Eastern cities. Arrowheads and other polished flint tools have been unearthed in various sites across the UAE while pieces of Ubaid Age pottery have been unearthed along the shores of the emirate. All evidence obtained so far indicates that contact with Mesopotamia existed as early as the 5th millennium BC, as an indigenous ceramic industry did not emerge until the 3rd century BC.

Finds at both Tell Abraq and Ed-Dur show habitation in the area throughout the Bronze Age, from the Hafit period, through the Umm Al Nar period and the later Wadi Suq and Iron I, II and III ages. Finds also link Ed-Dur with the inland settlement of Mleiha, especially distinctive burials of animals with their heads turned back on their bodies. Significant trading links with both the western Sumerian culture and the eastern Indus Valley culture are displayed at these sites, with the semi-nomadic Magan people smelting bronze mined in the Hajar Mountains and then shipping the smelted ore.

Macedonian coinage unearthed at Ed-Dur dates back to Alexander the Great, while hundreds of coins have been found bearing the name of Abi'el. In March 2019, 15 tombs, bronze statues, settlement remains, jewellery and pottery, dating back to the 1st century CE, were unearthed here. It is thought Ed-Dur is the site of Omana, mentioned by both Pliny and Strabo as an important town in the Lower Persian Gulf.

During the Bronze Age, agriculture flourished, with dates being the prominent crop. Wheat, millet and other grains were also cultivated wherever there was enough water for irrigation. It is now widely believed that the climate during the period was more temperate than now.

In 2022 the remains of a 6th/7th Century Eastern Christian monastery were found on Umm Al Quwain's Siniyah Island and in 2023, extensive remains of what stands as the oldest pearl diving town in the Persian Gulf were found on the island.

The modern history of Umm Al Quwain began some 200 years ago when the Al Ali tribe moved their capital from Siniyah Island to its current location in the mid-18th century due to declining water resources. After that, in 1775, Umm Al Quwain was declared an independent Sheikhdom. Siniyah was eventually abandoned following bombardment by British forces during the Persian Gulf Campaign of 1819.

=== 20th century ===
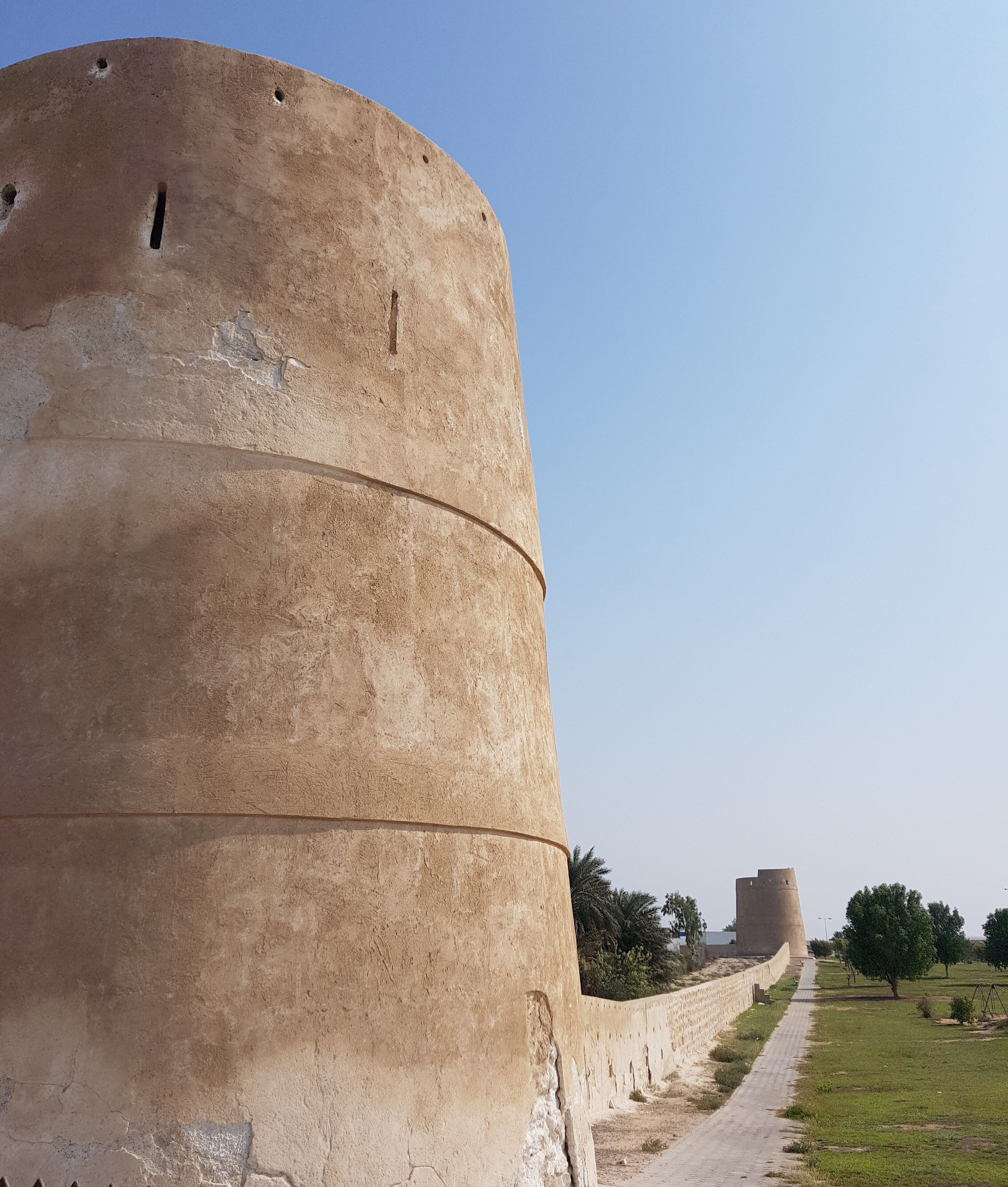
The protective wall and watchtowers guarding the old town of Umm Al Quwain

The Emirate of Umm Al Quwain was the site of a fort built in 1768 by the founder of the modern Al Mualla dynasty, Sheikh Rashid bin Majid of the Al Ali tribe. The fort was the site of two coups in one in 1923 and another in 1929. Sheikh Hamad Bin Ibrahim Al Mualla was assassinated by one of his blind uncle’s servants. The townsfolk, not liking the new leadership, rose and set fire to the fort, killing the usurpers, putting Ahmad bin Rashid Al Mualla in power. The fort has since been restored and now houses the Umm Al Quwain National Museum.

On 8 January 1820, Sheikh Abdullah bin Rashid signed the General Maritime Treaty with the United Kingdom, thus accepting a British protectorate in order to keep the Ottoman Turks out. Like Ajman, Dubai, Ras Al Khaimah and Sharjah, its position on the route to India made it important enough to be recognized as a salute state with a three gun salute.

By 1908, J. G. Lorimer's famous survey of the Trucial Coast, the Gazetteer of the Persian Gulf, Oman and Central Arabia, had Umm Al Quwain listed as a town of some 5,000 inhabitants and identified as the major boat-building centre on the coast, producing some 20 boats a year compared to 10 in Dubai and 5 in Sharjah.

On 2 December 1971, Sheikh Ahmad bin Rashid joined its neighbors Abu Dhabi, Dubai, Sharjah, Ajman and Fujairah in forming the United Arab Emirates, with Ras Al-Khaimah joining later in early 1972.

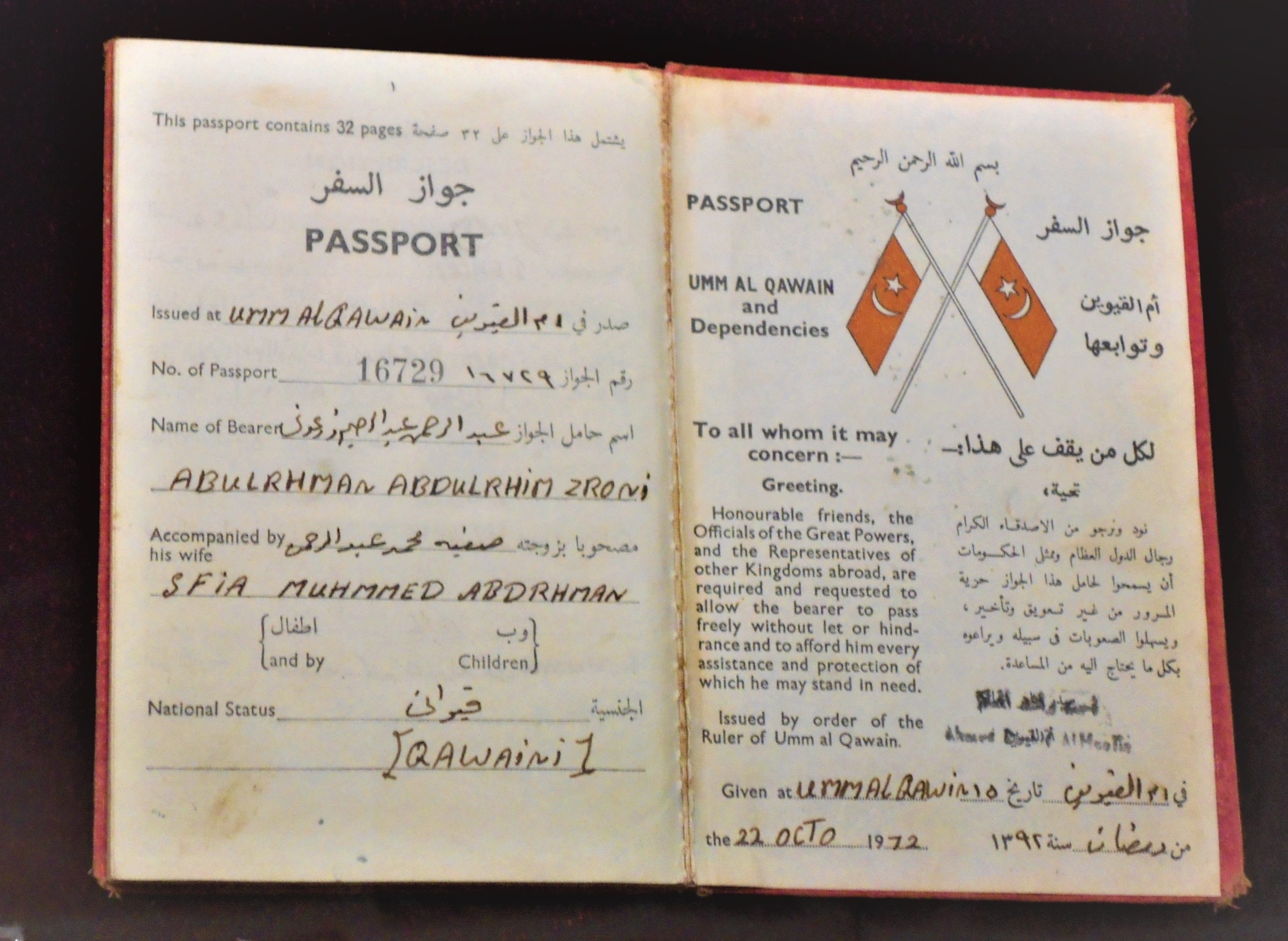
1972 Umm Al Qawain passport.

==== Petrochemicals ====
The American oil company Occidental acquired a concession to search for oil in Umm Al Quwain territorial waters on 19 November 1969. Occidental proposed drilling an exploratory well nine miles from the island of Abu Musa in the Persian Gulf in what it considered to be Umm Al Quwain waters. However, this conflicted with a 12-mile territorial limit claimed by Sharjah. On 15 May 1970, the British authorities referred the dispute to arbitration, but ruled that Occidental could continue to drill. On 20 May, Iran informed the British that it laid claim to Abu Musa and the two Tunbs' islands, and would intercede if Occidental continued to drill. The British proposed a three-month suspension of drilling pending the outcome of arbitration, a decision enforced by a British minesweeper, which intercepted Occidental's drilling platform and moved it out of the area.

The agreement between Sharjah and Iran over the island of Abu Musa, made on 29 November 1971 and the subsequent invasion of the islands on 30 November 1971 rendered the issue moot. Occidental would never find oil under its Umm Al Quwain concession. The issue was subsequently settled by an informal agreement, which granted Umm Al Quwain 15% share of the oil revenues from the area.

=== Rulers ===
The successive rulers of Umm Al Quwain were:

- 1768–1820: Sheikh Rashid bin Majid Al Mualla
- 1820–1853: Sheikh Abdullah bin Rashid Al Mualla (b.1794)
- 1853–1873: Sheikh Ali bin Abdullah Al Mualla (b.1824 – d.1873)
- 1873–1904: Sheikh Ahmad bin Abdullah Al Mualla (b. 1832 – d. 1904)
- 13 June 1904 – 1922: Sheikh Rashid bin Ahmad Al Mualla (b. 1876 – d. 1922)
- 1922 – October 1923: Sheikh Abdullah bin Rashid Al Mualla II
- October 1923 – 9 February 1929: Sheikh Hamad bin Ibrahim Al Mualla
- 9 February 1929 – 21 February 1981: Sheikh Ahmad bin Rashid Al Mualla (b. 1904 – d. 1981)
- 21 February 1981 – 2 January 2009: Sheikh Rashid bin Ahmad Al Mualla II (b. 1932 – d. 2009)
- 2 January 2009 – present: Sheikh Saud bin Rashid Al Mualla (b. 1952)

== Demographics ==
Historical population
Year	Pop.	±% p.a.
1980	12,426	—
1985	19,285	+9.19%
1995	35,361	+6.25%
2005	49,159	+3.35%
2010	59,000	+3.72%
Source: Citypopulation

== Economy and business ==
Umm Al Quwain was relying heavily on sources of revenue from hotels, parks, and tourism. In 2011, tourism and trade were given the top priority in the Umm Al Quwain's Government Strategy 2011-2013 to support small- and mid-sized business space and the fisheries sector to help make the emirate attractive to foreign investment.

=== Vision 2021 ===
In 2018, the government launched Umm Al Quwain Vision 2021 to implement comprehensive structural development through programs and initiatives and provide high-quality living standards for a cohesive society. The vision comprises five main pillars:

- A sustainable and diversified economy;
- Social solidarity
- Attractive tourism
- Excellent infrastructure, and
- Innovative government.

The government business initiatives and programs serve as a medium to support local businesses and industries to grow and boost partnerships with the private sector to build an economy based on knowledge, research, and development.

=== Free trade zone ===
The Free Trade Zone of Umm Al Quwain (UAQ FTZ) was established in 1987. It was previously known as Ahmed Bin Rashid Port and Free Zone. The UAQ Free Trade Zone has been awarded the winner of the Qadat Al Tagheer Award for the “Best Free Zone for Start-ups and SMEs” at the 5th UAE - India Economic Forum (UIEF) in 2019.

== Climate and environment ==
Umm al-Quwain

Climate chart (precipitation, max. and min. temperature)
J	F	M	A	M	J	J	A	S	O	N	D
6.9 24 13	1.3 26 14	2.6 29 17	2.6 34 20	0 38 24	0 40 27	0 41 29	0.1 41 29	0 39 26	0 35 23	6.8 30 19	9.6 26 15
- █ Average max. and min. temperatures in °C
- █ Precipitation totals in mm
Imperial conversion
J	F	M	A	M	J	J	A	S	O	N	D
0.3 75 56	0.1 79 58	0.1 84 62	0.1 92 69	0 101 76	0 103 80	0 106 85	0 106 85	0 102 79	0 96 73	0.3 87 66	0.4 79 59
- █ Average max. and min. temperatures in °F
- █ Precipitation totals in inches

During November to March, the average temperature is 27 °C (81 °F) by day and 15 °C (59 °F) at night, but it can rise to over 40 °C (104 °F) in the peak of the summer and when humidity levels are high. The rainfall is minimal and averages 42 mm (1.7 in) a year. The coastline experiences cooling sea breezes during the day.

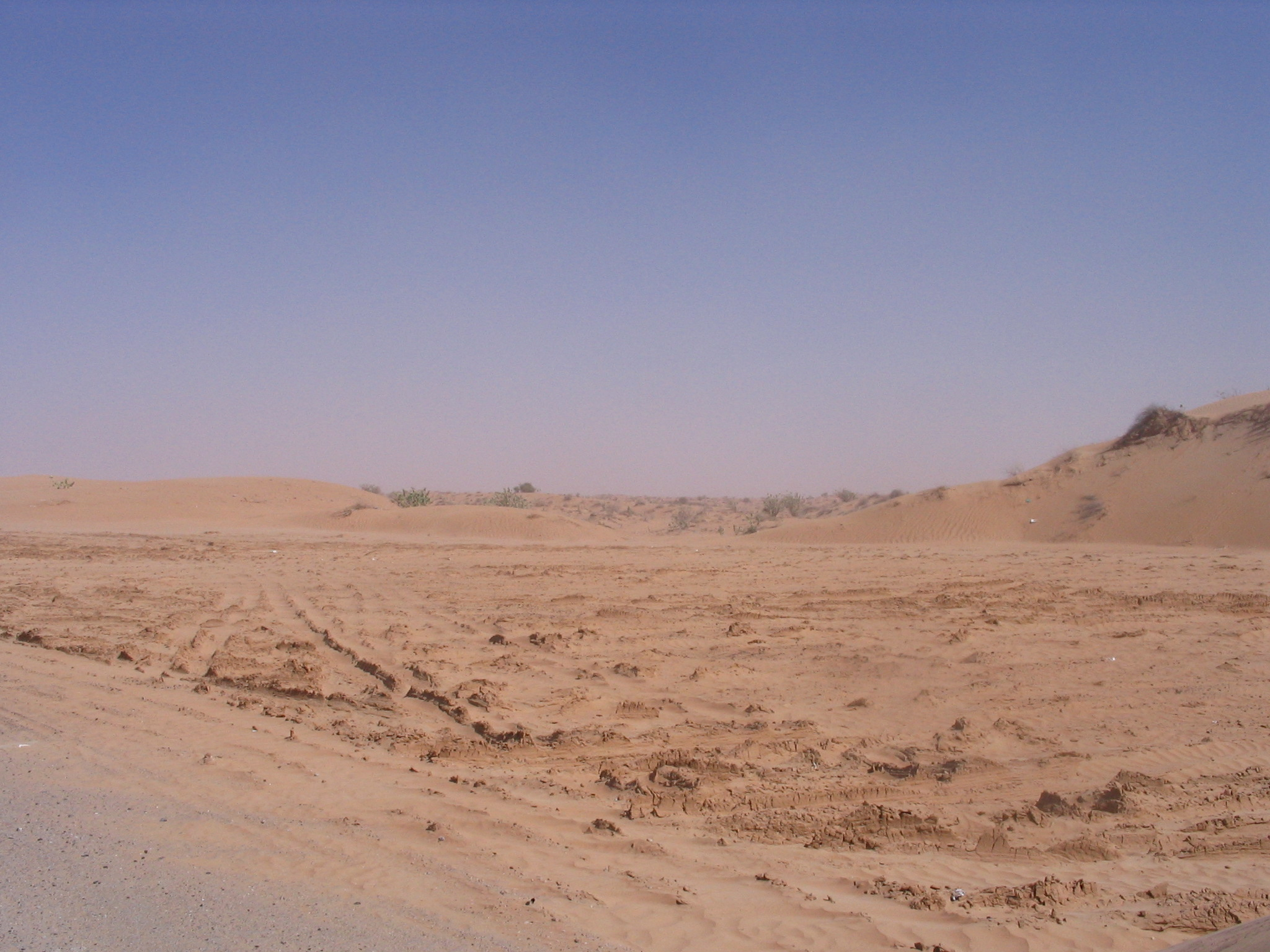
The desert landscape of Umm Al-Quwain

Al Sinniyah island, close to the city of Umm Al Quwain is home to the UAE's largest Socotra cormorant colony, with over 15,000 pairs making it the third largest colony in the world. Arabian gazelles have been introduced to Sinniyah and appear to be prospering. Marine life is remarkable for its abundance and diversity. Blacktip reef sharks patrol the outer shoreline, while green turtles are ubiquitous in the inner leads in particular. Between Al Sinniyah and the mainland is Khor Al Beidah, an expansive area of sand and mud flats of international importance for its waterfowl. Although not formally protected, the island of Sinaiyah, along with Khor Al Beidah, is one of the largest areas of undisturbed and varied coastal environment remaining anywhere in the UAE.

== Culture ==
The UAE culture mainly revolves around the religion of Islam and traditional Arab culture. The influence of Islamic and Arab culture on its architecture, music, attire, cuisine and lifestyle are very prominent as well. Five times every day, Muslims are called to prayer from the minarets of mosques which are scattered around the country. Since 2006, the weekend has been Friday-Saturday, as a compromise between Friday's holiness to Muslims and the Western weekend of Saturday-Sunday.

== Tourism ==
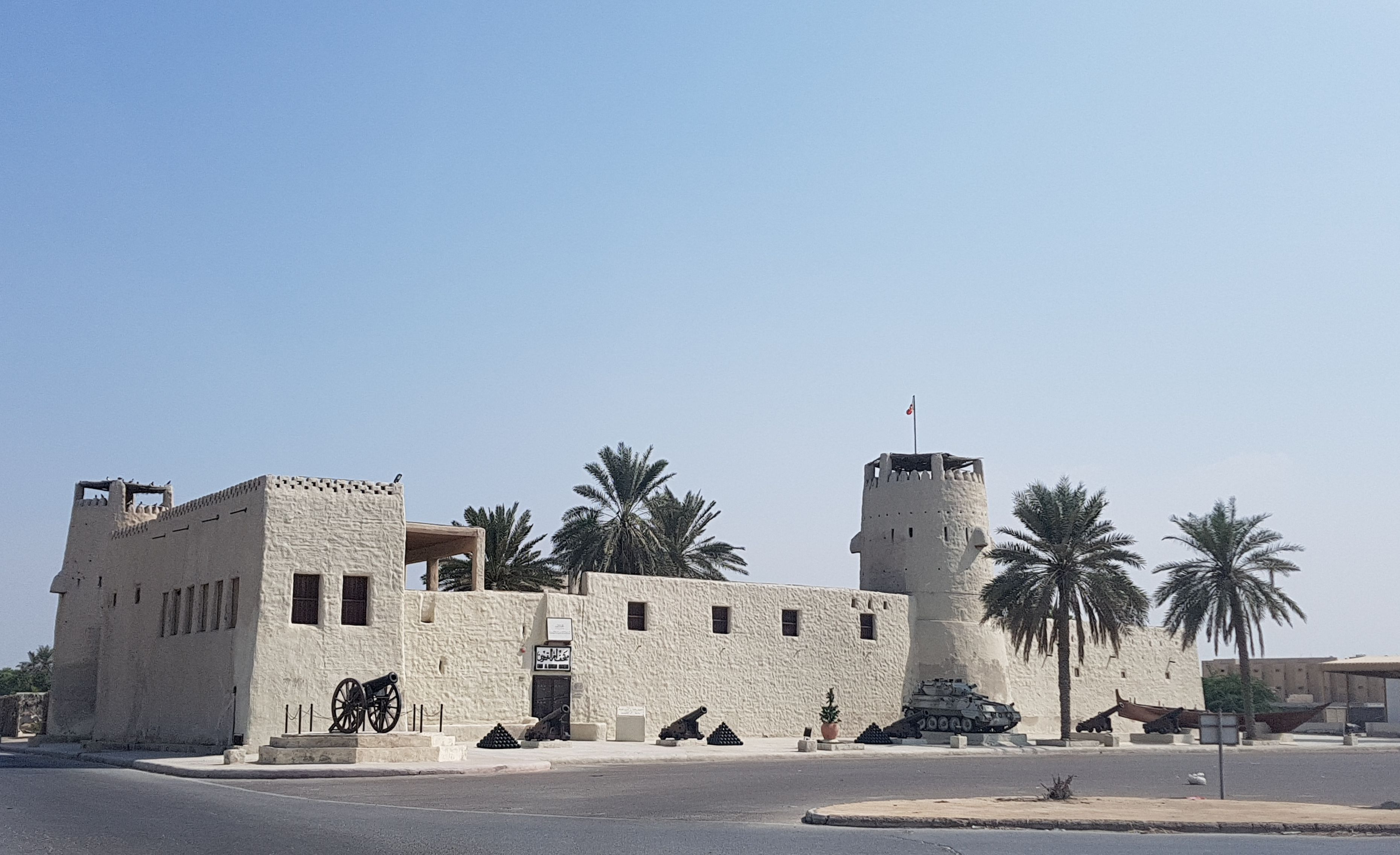
Umm Al Quwain Fort

Umm Al Quwain Fort: A fort which was once home to the emirate's ruler and guarded the entrance to the old town, overseeing the sea on one side and the creek on the other. It eventually became a police station then a museum. The museum now houses artifacts found at important nearby sites including Ed-Dur and houses a collection of weapons that were used through the emirate's history. It is located near a Masjid (Mosque) in Umm Al Quwain Bazaar.

Old Harbour: An old harbour located in the old town overlooking the traditional dhow building yard where skilled craftsmen continue to assemble these traditional boats. The harbor is surrounded by old coral stone houses that display features of the original architecture and intricate sculptured plaster work.

Islands of Umm Al Quwain: Islands that lie to the east of the mainland peninsula on a unique stretch of coastline consisting of sandy islands surrounded by dense mangrove forests, separated by a series of creeks. The largest of the seven islands is Sinniyah, followed by Jazirat Al Ghallah and Al Keabe, all of which are visible from the old town. Tucked in between these and the coastal plains are the smaller islands of Al Sow, Al Qaram, Al Humaidi, Al Chewria and Al Harmala. The Madaar creek that runs between the islands provides a navigable waterway for fisherman even at low tide when the average depth is less than a few feet.

Ed-Dur: Located to the north of Umm Al Quwain, the ancient city of Ed-Dur is considered the largest pre-Islamic site on the Persian Gulf coast. There are two public monuments at Ed-Dour, a small square fort with round corner towers and a small square temple dedicated to the Semitic sun god Shamash. The site is not open to the public.

Dreamland Aqua Park: is located on the coastline of Umm Al Quwain; about 40 minutes drive from Dubai, with 250 ha (620 acres) expanse of landscaped gardens and over 30 rides, slides, and attractions. The Park is operated all year round with a daily capacity of ten thousand visitors.

== See also ==
- Archaeology of the United Arab Emirates
- Trucial States
- Umm Al Quwain University
