= Umm Al Quwain Museum =

Coordinates: 25.5842°N 55.5707°E

UAQ Museum
- Location: Umm Al Quwain, United Arab Emirates
- Type: National museum

Umm Al Quwain Museum, also known as UAQ National Museum or Umm Al Quwain National Museum, is a museum founded by Sheikh Rashid bin Majid Al Mualla. It is located in an old souq area called Madeena Al Qadeema in the city of Umm Al Quwain, United Arab Emirates, in an old fort that was once home to the ruling family.

The fort acted as government headquarters in the years 1768 to 1969 until Al Mualla renovated and transformed it into a museum. It embraces the history and heritage of the Emirates. Umm Al Quwain Museum is considered one of the oldest structures in the Emirates.

== Exhibits ==
=== Royal Family heritage ===
One section of the museum is dedicated to the heritage of the royal family.

==== The devoted room ====
This room displays important Umm Al Quwain documents. Amongst them are the first passport issued in Umm Al Quwain, the Trucial Emirates passport, the first driver's license, the first commercial license, the government’s seal, a set of postage stamps, and even a hand-written Quran dating back to the year 1800 AD.

==== The military room ====
This room features a collection of old car number plates, driver licenses, old military uniforms, Islamic shields, as well as a set of old photos.

==== The Sheikh’s chambers ====
His room is reminiscent of traditional Emarati furnishing, with a large place on the upper floor that overlooks the inner courtyard.

==== The Sheikha’s chambers ====
Designed to preserve the privacy of women, the Sheikha’s room consists of a bedroom as well as Harem Majlis. The former includes a shubriyeh or a bed, a Mandoos, a perfume box, a manz or a crib, and utensils; the latter acts as a place of gathering for the Sheikha’s female guests.

==== Documentary film room ====
In a small corner of the room are paintings of the ruling family and some historical events that took place in the Al-Manshar tower. A family tree of the ruling family with names encased in gold lettering is present.

There is also a collection of old tools— the camera, the radio, the Beshtakhta, old telephones, and the typewriter— that were used in documentation.

=== Antiques section ===
==== Sea chamber ====
Evident in these rooms are models of fishing nets, an old boat, how diving and trade was done using ships, and even diving tools— the compass, scales, and pearl sifting sieves are just a few examples. There is also a model of the shifa tree that grew at the bottom of the sea and indicated the locations of pearls.

==== Al Hosn kitchen ====
From pots, bowls, trays and coffee pots to mashkhaleh, mahmas, and molasses, this room showcases necessary components of a traditionally styled kitchen.

==== The Weapon Room ====
The Al Mualla family inherited a variety of weapons that are put on display in this room, many of which were used in hunting and wars, such as pistols, rifles, swords, and daggers. There is also a belt that looks to have been made to hold bullets.

==== The prison ====
This part of the fort acted as the prison, where there was something called al-Hataba, “a large wood through which an iron tube extends, in which the imprisoned man puts his feet and then they close its ends.”

==== The Arish ====
Also called the Barasti, the Arish is a structure of palm fronds, or daun. Before the Oil Age, residents used to build and live in the Arish, keeping themselves cool in the summer. A few contain a bargeel, which brings air inside the structure.

== Others ==
There are also a number of military and war exhibits, one of which has cannons.

== Opening hours ==
The museum is open from Saturday to Thursday at 8 AM till 1 PM and again at 5 PM - 8 PM. On Friday, it is open from 5 PM till 8 PM.

== Entry fees ==
It is free for people under 15 years old and 4 AED for adults.
