= Abdullah bin Rashid Al Mualla =

Ruler of Umm Al Quwain from 1820 to 1853

- Sheikh

Ruler of Umm Al Quwain
- Reign: 1817–1862
- Predecessor: Rashid bin Majid Al Mualla
- Successor: Ali bin Abdullah Al Mualla
- House: Al Mualla

Sheikh Abdullah bin Rashid Al Mualla was the Ruler of Umm Al Quwain from 1820 to 1853. The head of the Al Ali tribe, he was signatory to both the 1820 General Maritime Treaty with the British and the 1853 Perpetual Maritime Truce, making Umm Al Quwain a Trucial State. Today it is one of the seven United Arab Emirates (UAE).

His predecessor was Sheikh Rashid bin Majid Al Mualla, who originally established the fortification at Umm Al Quwain, when the Al Ali tribe moved onshore from their previous location on Sinniyah Island.

== Reign ==
Relatively little is recorded regarding the reign of Abdullah bin Rashid and most contemporary sources date his rule by default to 1820 as he was a signatory to the General Maritime Treaty of 1820 following the British punitive expedition from Bombay against the Al Qasimi at Ras Al Khaimah.

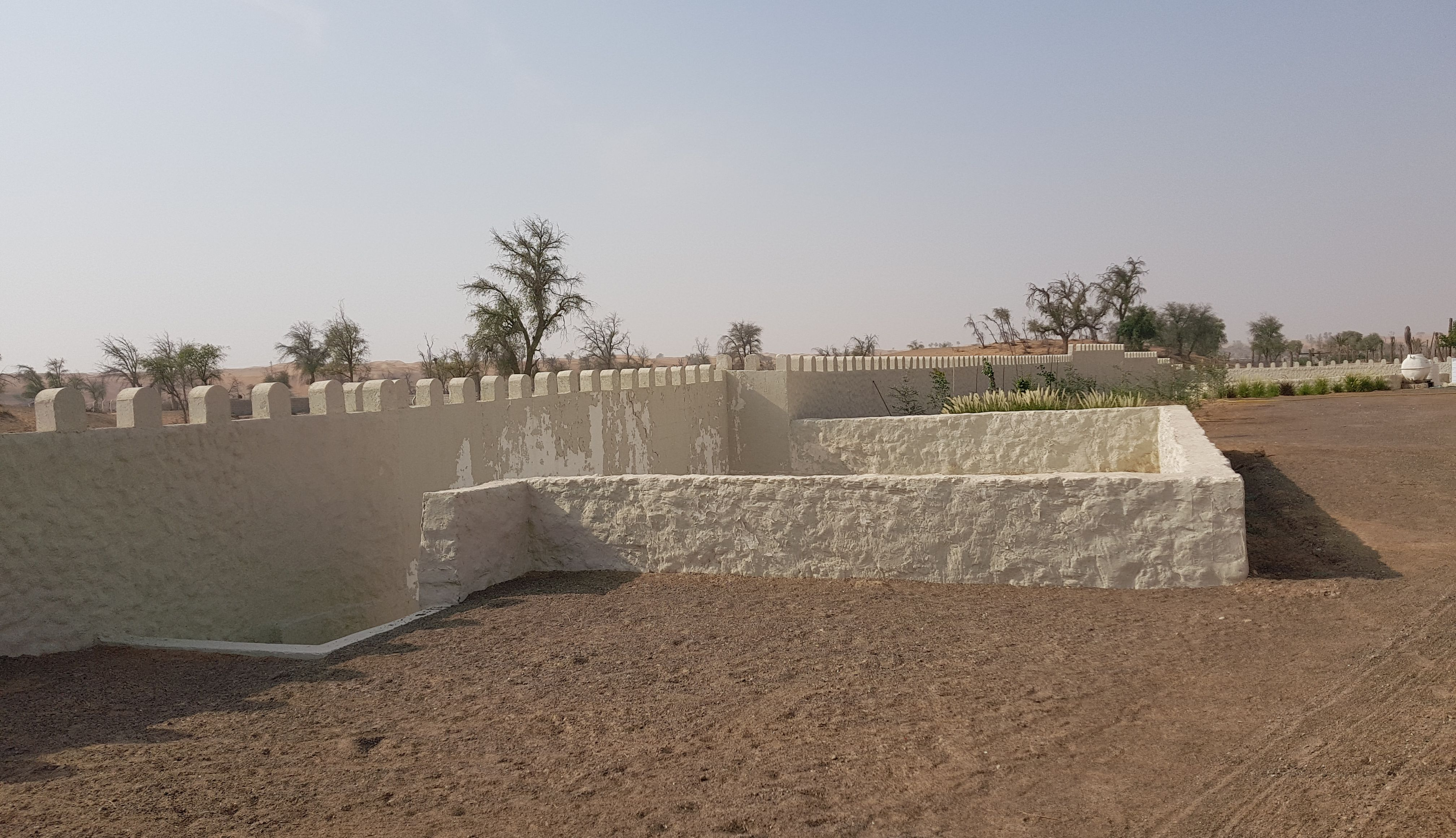
The 'Sharea' or baths at Falaj Al Mualla were built by Sheikh Abdullah bin Rashid Al Mualla

In 1819, that force bombarded the coastal settlements of the Gulf Peninsula, leading to the capitulation of the coastal Sheikhs and the signing of the treaty in Ras Al Khaimah and Sharjah. Abdullah bin Rashid signed the treaty on 15 March 1820 along with Rashid bin Humaid, Sheikh of Ajman. Both Rulers signed the treaty at Falayah, an inland dependency of Ras Al Khaimah.

Abdullah bin Rashid was also signatory to the 1847 'Engagement to Prohibit Exportation of Slaves' before signing the 1853 Perpetual Maritime Truce. This treaty had been preceded by a number of interim treaties agreed by the rulers of what became known as the Trucial Coast with the British designed to maintain peace at sea during the pearling season. Following a number of these six-monthly treaties, a series of annual agreements was largely successful in maintaining peace on the coast, leading to the perpetual truce.

As well as settling Umm Al Quwain, the Al Ali established themselves in an inland oasis, some 30 km from the coast, then known as Falaj Al Ali and today called Falaj Al Mualla. Abdullah bin Rashid is credited with building a bathhouse, or sharea, there - segregated for the use of men and women.

Abdullah bin Rashid was succeeded by his eldest son, Ali. The year of his death is not known.
