= Absolute monarchy =

Government where the monarch has absolute power

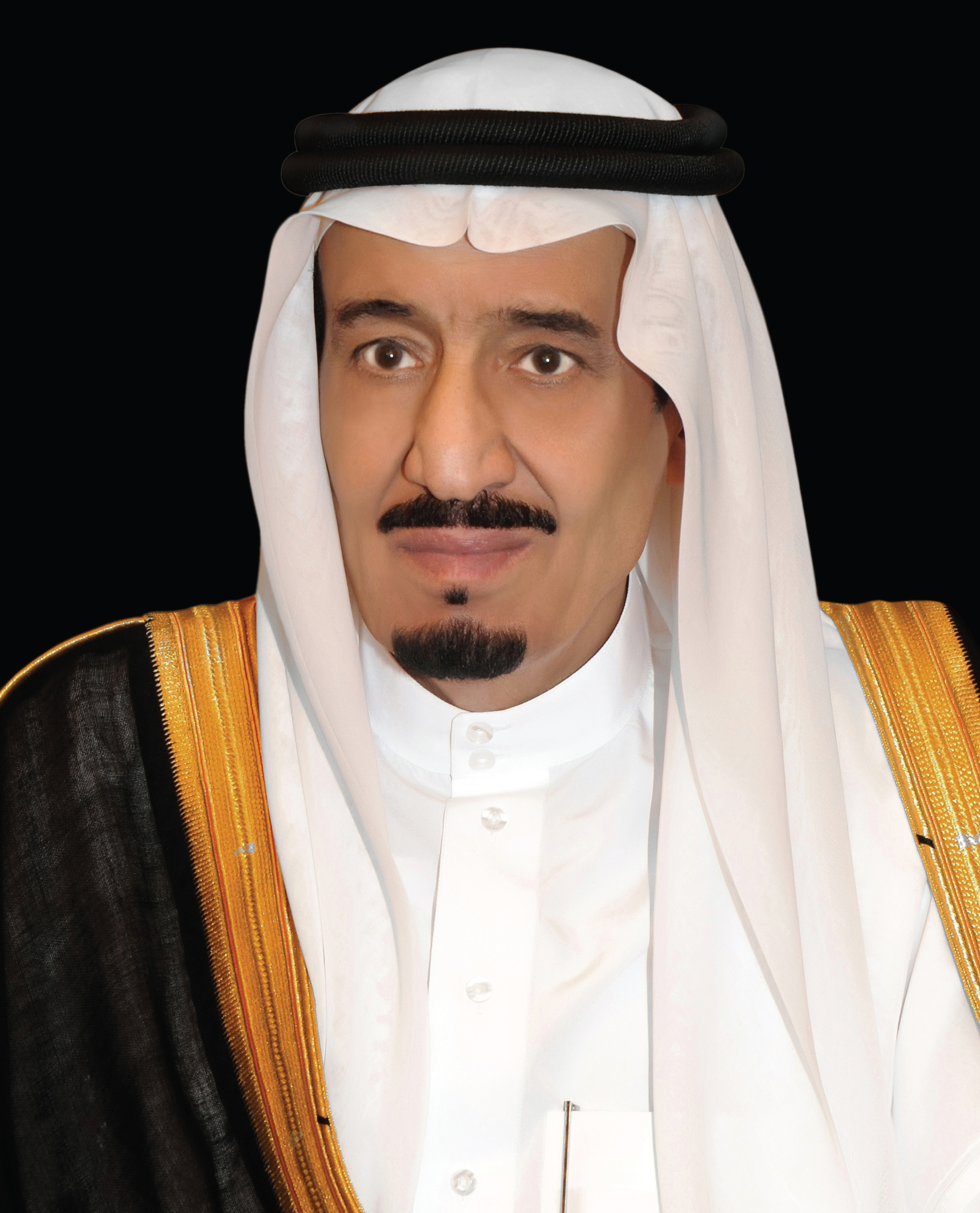
King Salman bin Abdulaziz and Sultan Haitham bin Tariq are the current absolute monarchs of Saudi Arabia and Oman, respectively.

Absolute monarchy is a form of monarchy in which the sovereign is the sole source of political power, unconstrained by constitutions, legislatures or other checks on their authority. Throughout history, there have been many examples of absolute monarchs, with some famous examples including Louis XIV and Frederick the Great.

The number of absolute monarchies in the world varies but most datasets agree that Brunei, Eswatini, Oman, Qatar, and Saudi Arabia are absolute monarchies, while others include Bahrain, Bhutan, Jordan, Kuwait, Liechtenstein, Monaco, Morocco, Tonga, Vatican City and the United Arab Emirates.

Though absolute monarchies are sometimes supported by legal documents (such as the King's Law of Denmark–Norway), they are distinct from constitutional monarchies, in which the authority of the monarch is restricted (e.g. by legislature or unwritten customs) or balanced by that of other officials, such as a prime minister, as is in the case of the United Kingdom, or the Nordic countries.

Absolute monarchies are distinct from hereditary dictatorships such as North Korea, Duvalier Haiti or Ba'athist Syria.

== Historical examples of absolute monarchies ==
World's states colored by systems of government: Parliamentary systems: Head of government is elected or nominated by and accountable to the legislature. Constitutional monarchy with a ceremonial monarch Semi-constitutional monarchy: Monarch holds significant executive or legislative power but is still restricted by the constitution. Parliamentary republic with a ceremonial president Parliamentary republic with an executive president Presidential system: Head of government (president) is popularly elected and independent of the legislature. Presidential republic Theocratic presidential republic: Supreme leader is highest authority; popularly elected president still exists. Hybrid systems: Semi-presidential republic: Executive president is independent of the legislature; head of government is appointed by the president and is accountable to the legislature. Assembly-independent republic: Head of government (president or directory) is elected by the legislature, but is not accountable to it. Other systems: Islamic theocracy: Supreme leader holds unlimited political and religious power; state and faith are a single institution. Absolute monarchy: Monarch has unlimited power. One-party state: Power is constitutionally linked to a single political party. Provisional government: Current regime is temporary or transitional; no permanent constitution. Military junta: Committee of military leaders controls the government; constitutional provisions are suspended. Places without governments. Note: this chart represents the de jure systems of government, not the de facto degree of democracy.

=== Asia ===
==== Ottoman Empire ====
In the Ottoman Empire, the Sultan wielded absolute power over the state through heavenly mandates reflected in their titles, such as "Shadow of God on Earth".

==== East Asia ====
Throughout Imperial China, many emperors and one empress (Wu Zetian) wielded absolute power through the Mandate of Heaven. Korea under the Joseon dynasty and short-lived empire was also an absolute monarchy.

=== The Americas ===
In pre-Columbian America, the Inca Empire was ruled by a Sapa Inca, who was considered the son of Inti, the sun god and absolute ruler over the people and nation.

=== Europe ===
Throughout much of European history, the divine right of kings was the theological justification for absolute monarchy. Many European monarchs claimed supreme autocratic power by divine right, and that their subjects had no rights to limit their power.

==== Kingdoms of England and Scotland ====
James VI and I and his son Charles I tried to import the principle of divine right into Scotland and England. Charles I's attempt to enforce episcopal polity on the Church of Scotland led to rebellion by the Covenanters and the Bishops' Wars, then fears that Charles I was attempting to establish absolutist government along European lines was a major cause of the English Civil War, although he did rule this way for 11 years starting in 1629, after dissolving the Parliament of England for a time.

==== Denmark–Norway ====
Absolutism was underpinned by a written constitution for the first time in Europe in 1665 Kongeloven, 'King's Law' of Denmark–Norway, which ordered that the Monarch:

...shall from this day forth be revered and considered the most perfect and supreme person on the Earth by all his subjects, standing above all human laws and having no judge above his person, neither in spiritual nor temporal matters, except God alone.

This law consequently authorized the king to abolish all other centers of power. Most important was the abolition of the Council of the Realm in Denmark. Absolute monarchy lasted until 1814 in Norway, and 1848 in Denmark.

==== Habsburgs ====
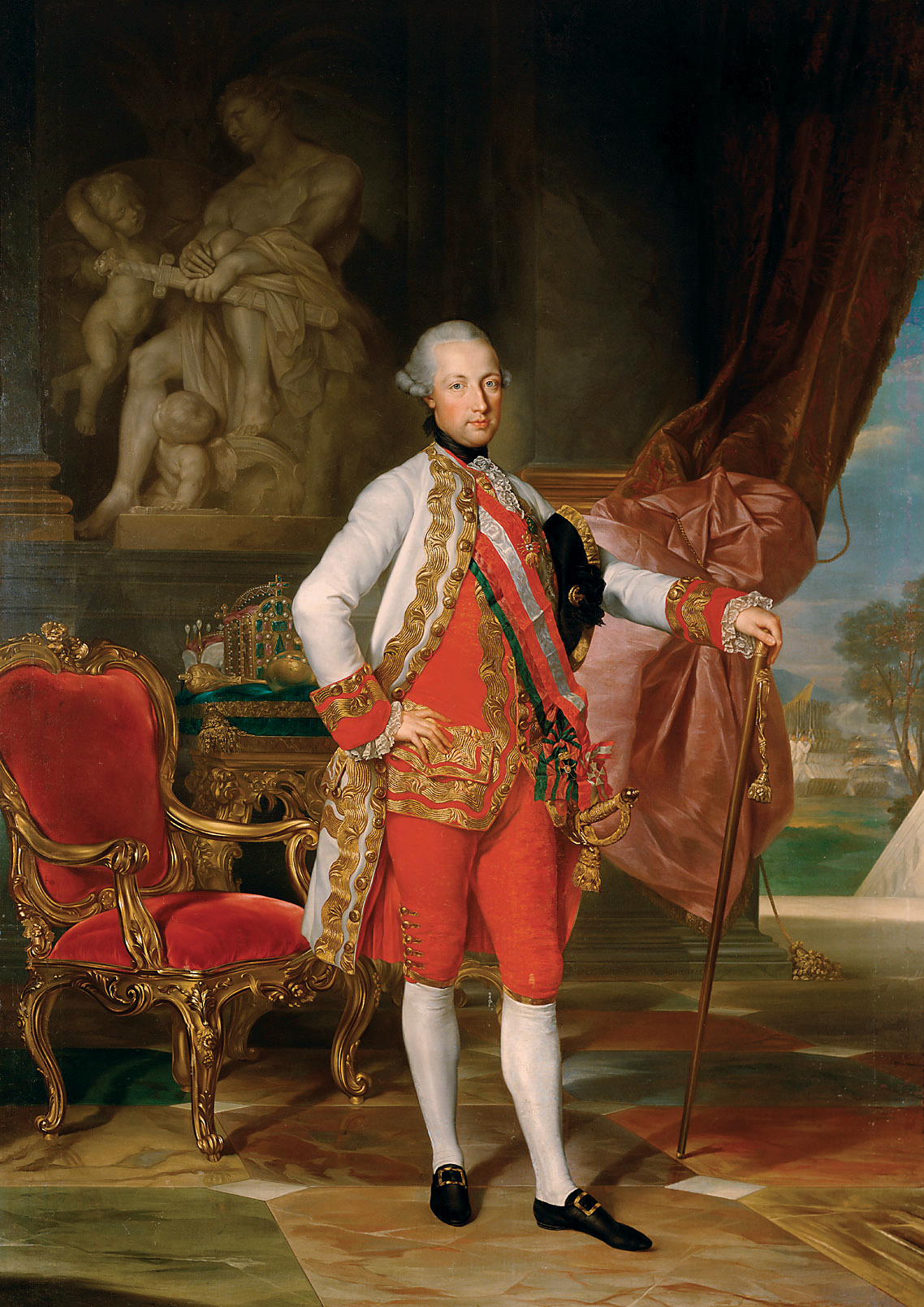
Joseph II, Holy Roman Emperor

An example of a member of the House of Habsburg-Lorraine that ruled over the Holy Roman Empire was Joseph II, a sovereign raised during the Enlightenment. Joseph II extended full legal freedom to serfs in 1781. Franz Joseph I of Austria was Emperor of Austria from 1848 until his death in 1916 and was succeeded by Charles I of Austria. Charles I was the last Emperor of Austria and abdicated on 12 November 1918 due to Austria-Hungary losing World War I.

==== France ====
Louis XIV of France

Louis XIV (1638–1715) is said to have proclaimed L'état, c'est moi!, 'I am the State!'. Although often criticized for his extravagances, such as the Palace of Versailles, he reigned over France for a long period.

The king of France concentrated legislative, executive, and judicial powers in his person. He was the supreme judicial authority. He could condemn people to death without the right of appeal. It was both his duty to punish offenses and stop them from being committed. From his judicial authority followed his power both to make laws and to annul them.

==== Prussia ====
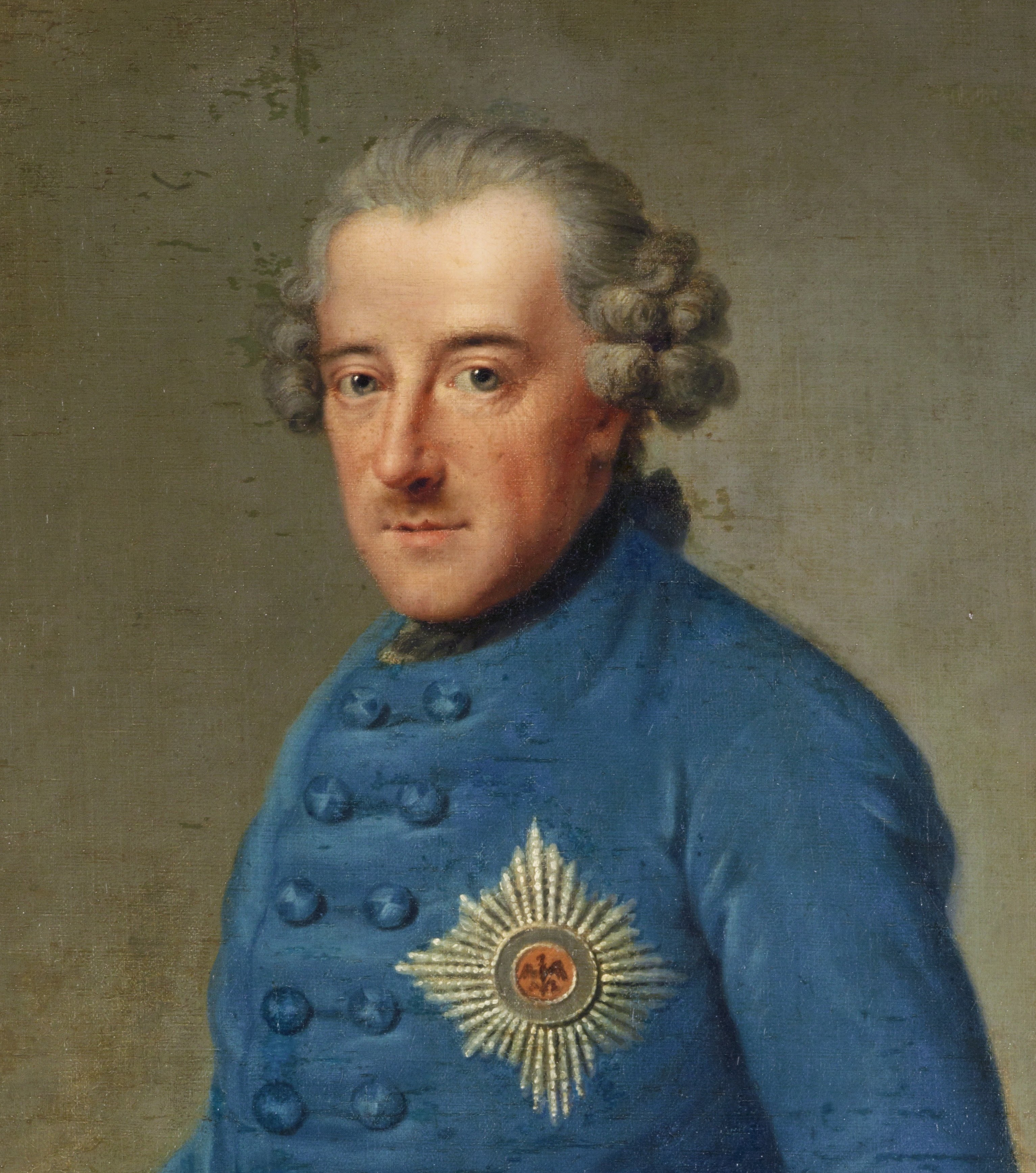
King Frederick II of Prussia, "the Great"

In Brandenburg-Prussia, the concept of absolute monarch took a notable turn from the above with its emphasis on the monarch as the "first servant of the state", but it also echoed many of the important characteristics of absolutism. Prussia was ruled by the House of Hohenzollern as a feudal monarchy from 1525 to 1701 and an absolute monarchy from 1701 to 1848, after which it became a federal semi-constitutional monarchy from 1848 to 1918 until the monarchy was abolished during the German Revolution.

Frederick I was the first King in Prussia, beginning his reign on 18 January 1701. King Frederick the Great adopted the title King of Prussia in 1772, the same year he annexed most of Royal Prussia in the First Partition of Poland, and practiced enlightened absolutism until his death in 1786. He introduced a general civil code, abolished torture and established the principle that the Crown would not interfere in matters of justice. He also promoted an advanced secondary education, the forerunner of today's German gymnasium (grammar school) system, which prepares high achieving students for university studies. The Prussian education system was emulated in various countries, including the United States.

==== Russia ====
Photograph of Tsar Alexander II, 1878–81

Until 1905, the tsars and emperors of Russia governed as absolute monarchs. Ivan IV ("the Terrible") was known for his reign of terror through the oprichnina. Following the Time of Troubles in the early 17th century, the traditional alliance of autocratic monarchy, the church, and the aristocracy was widely seen as the only basis for preserving the social order and Russian statehood, which legitimized the rule of the Romanov dynasty. Peter I ("the Great") reduced the power of the Russian nobility and strengthened the central power of the monarch, establishing a bureaucracy. This tradition of absolutism was expanded by Catherine II and her descendants.

Russia became the last European country (excluding Vatican City) to abolish absolutism, and it was the only one to do so as late as the 20th century (the Ottoman Empire drafted its first constitution in 1876). Russia was one of the four continental empires which collapsed after World War I, along with Germany, Austria–Hungary, and the Ottoman Empire. In 1918, the Bolsheviks executed the Romanov family, ending three centuries of Romanov rule.

== Contemporary trends ==
The Revolutions of 1848, known in some countries as the Springtime of the Peoples or the Springtime of Nations, were a series of political upheavals throughout Europe in 1848.

Many nations formerly with absolute monarchies, such as Jordan, Kuwait, Morocco and Qatar, have de jure moved towards a constitutional monarchy. However, in these cases, the monarch still retains tremendous powers, even to the extent that by some measures, parliament's influence on political life is viewed as negligible or merely consultative. (Note: "By 1985 the legislature appeared to have become more firmly established and recognized as a body in which notables representing authentic forces in the political spectrum could address national issues and problems. But it had not gained real autonomy or a direct role in the shaping of government policies." [...] "In spite of its formally defined role in the lawmaking and budgetary processes, the parliament had not established itself as an independent branch of government, owing to the restrictions on its constitutional authority and the dominating influence of the king. The fact that the king has been able to govern for long periods by zahir after dissolving the legislative body has further underscored the marginality of the chamber." — J.R. Tartter (1986))

In Nepal, there were several swings between constitutional rule and direct rule related to the Nepalese Civil War, the Maoist insurgency, and the 2001 Nepalese royal massacre, with the Nepalese monarchy being abolished on 28 May 2008.

In Tonga, the king had majority control of the Legislative Assembly until 2010.

=== Liechtenstein ===
Liechtenstein has moved towards expanding the power of the monarch—the Prince of Liechtenstein was given vast expanded powers after a referendum to amend the Constitution of Liechtenstein in 2003, which led BBC News to describe the prince as an "absolute monarch again". The referendum granted the monarch the powers to dismiss the government, nominate judges and veto legislation, among others. Just prior to the referendum, the Venice Commission of the Council of Europe published a comprehensive report analysing the amendments, opining that they were not compatible with the European standards of democracy, effectively making Liechtenstein a de facto absolute monarchy. Prince Hans-Adam II had also previously threatened to leave the country and move his assets out of Liechtenstein if voters had chosen to restrict his powers.

=== Saudi Arabia ===
Saudi Arabia is an absolute monarchy, and according to the Basic Law of Saudi Arabia adopted by Royal Decree in 1992, the King must comply with Sharia (Islamic law) and the Quran. The Quran and the body of the Sunnah (traditions of the Islamic prophet, Muhammad) are declared to be the Kingdom's Constitution, but no written modern constitution has ever been promulgated for Saudi Arabia, which remains the only Arab nation where no national elections have ever taken place since its founding. No political parties or national elections are permitted. The Saudi government is the world's most authoritarian regime in 2023 measured by the electoral democracy score of the V-Dem Democracy indices.

=== Oman ===
Oman is an absolute monarchy, with the sultan of Oman being both head of state and head of government. The sultan is hereditary, who appoints a cabinet to assist him. The sultan also serves as the supreme commander of the armed forces and prime minister. Oman bans all political parties.

=== Vatican City ===
Vatican City continues to be an absolute monarchy, but is unique because it is also a microstate, ecclesiastical jurisdiction, and elective monarchy. As of 2023, Vatican City has a population of 764 residents (regardless of citizenship). It is the smallest state in the world both by area and by population. The Pope is the absolute monarch of Vatican City, and is elected by a papal conclave with a two-thirds supermajority.

As governed by the Holy See, Vatican City State is an sacerdotal-monarchical state ruled by the Pope, who is the bishop of Rome and head of the Catholic Church. Unlike citizenship of other states, which is based either on jus sanguinis or jus soli, citizenship of Vatican City is granted on jus officii, namely on the grounds of appointment to work in a certain capacity in the service of the Holy See. It usually ceases upon cessation of the appointment. Citizenship is also extended to the spouse and children of a citizen, provided they are living together in the city.

== Current absolute monarchs ==
Denotes subnational monarchy

Realm	Image	Monarch	Born	Age	Since	Length	Succession	Ref(s)
Brunei Darussalam		Sultan Hassanal Bolkiah	15 July 1946	80 years, 130 days	4 October 1967	59 years, 49 days	Hereditary	
Emirate of Sharjah		Ruler Sultan bin Muhammad Al-Qasimi	2 July 1939	87 years, 143 days	25 January 1972	54 years, 301 days	Hereditary	
Emirate of Fujairah		Ruler Hamad bin Mohammed Al Sharqi	22 February 1949	77 years, 273 days	18 September 1974	52 years, 65 days	Hereditary	
Emirate of Ajman		Ruler Humaid bin Rashid Al Nuaimi III	1931	94–95 years	6 September 1981	45 years, 77 days	Hereditary	
Kingdom of Eswatini		Ngwenyama Mswati III	19 April 1968	58 years, 217 days	25 April 1986	40 years, 211 days	Hereditary and elective	
Emirate of Dubai		Ruler Mohammed bin Rashid Al Maktoum	15 July 1949	77 years, 130 days	4 January 2006	20 years, 322 days	Hereditary	
Emirate of Umm al-Quwain		Ruler Saud bin Rashid Al Mualla	1 October 1952	74 years, 52 days	2 January 2009	17 years, 324 days	Hereditary	
Emirate of Ras al-Khaimah		Ruler Saud bin Saqr Al Qasimi	10 February 1956	70 years, 285 days	27 October 2010	16 years, 26 days	Hereditary	
Kingdom of Saudi Arabia		King Salman bin Abdul‘aziz	31 December 1935	90 years, 326 days	23 January 2015	11 years, 303 days	Hereditary and elective	
Sultanate of Oman		Sultan Haitham bin Tariq Al Said	11 October 1954	72 years, 42 days	11 January 2020	6 years, 315 days	Hereditary	
Emirate of Abu Dhabi		Ruler Mohamed bin Zayed Al Nahyan	11 March 1961	65 years, 256 days	13 May 2022	4 years, 193 days	Hereditary	
Vatican City State	Portrait of Pope Leo XIV	Pope Leo XIV	14 September 1955	71 years, 69 days	8 May 2025	1 year, 198 days	Elective	

== Scholarship ==
There is a considerable variety of opinion by historians on the extent of absolutism among European monarchs. Some, such as Perry Anderson, argue that quite a few monarchs achieved levels of absolutist control over their states, while historians such as Roger Mettam dispute the very concept of absolutism. In general, historians who disagree with the appellation of absolutism argue that most monarchs labeled as absolutist exerted no greater power over their subjects than any other non-absolutist rulers, and these historians tend to emphasize the differences between the absolutist rhetoric of monarchs and the realities of the effective use of power by these absolute monarchs. Renaissance historian William Bouwsma summed up this contradiction:

Nothing so clearly indicates the limits of royal power as the fact that governments were perennially in financial trouble, unable to tap the wealth of those ablest to pay, and likely to stir up a costly revolt whenever they attempted to develop an adequate income.

— William Bouwsma

Anthropology, sociology, and ethology as well as various other disciplines such as political science attempt to explain the rise of absolute monarchy ranging from extrapolation generally, to certain Marxist explanations in terms of the class struggle as the underlying dynamic of human historical development generally and absolute monarchy in particular.

In the 17th century, French legal theorist Jean Domat defended the concept of absolute monarchy in works such as "On Social Order and Absolute Monarchy", citing absolute monarchy as preserving natural order as God intended. Other intellectual figures who supported absolute monarchy include Thomas Hobbes and Charles Maurras.

== See also ==
- Autocracy
- Authoritarianism
- Constitutional monarchy
- Criticism of monarchy
- Despotism
- Dictatorship
- Enlightened absolutism
- Monarchomachs
- Rule of man
- Totalitarianism
- Tyranny
