= Umm Al Quwain Wall =

Historic defensive wall in Umm Al Quwain, United Arab Emirates

Coordinates: 25.5864°N 55.5646°E

Umm Al Quwain Wall (Arabic: سور أم القيوين) is a historic defensive wall in the old town of Umm Al Quwain, United Arab Emirates. It was built in 1820 during the reign of Sheikh Abdullah bin Rashid Al Mualla, ruler of Umm Al Quwain, to protect the town from attack.

== History ==
Umm Al Quwain occupies a peninsula bounded by water on three sides, leaving only a narrow strip of land connecting it to the mainland. The wall was built across this landward neck—between the Persian Gulf to the north and the creek (khor) of Umm Al Quwain to the south—to close the only overland approach to the town and to defend it against attack from both land and sea. Built in 1820, it became one of the town's principal defensive works, and is regarded as one of the emirate's notable historical sites.

== Description ==
The wall runs for about 290 metres and stands roughly 3 metres high. It is built of coral stone faced with gypsum plaster and is reinforced by three watchtowers of differing heights, known as the Al Lazima towers, along with loopholes for firing on attackers. Access to the town was controlled through a main gateway made of teak wood with iron fittings. The wall and its towers have since been restored and set within a small park, and the site is a heritage attraction.

== See also ==
- Umm Al Quwain Fort
