= Al Mualla =

Royal Family of Umm Al Quwain

- Royal house
- Parent house: Al Ali
- Country: United Arab Emirates
- Founded: 1768; 258 years ago
- Founder: Rashid bin Majid Al Mualla
- Current head: Saud bin Rashid Al Mualla
- Titles: Emir; Sheikh
- Style: His/Her Highness

The Al Mualla (Arabic: المعلا) family is the ruling royal family of Umm Al Quwain, one of the seven emirates that together comprise the United Arab Emirates (UAE).

The family was traditionally at the head of the Al Ali tribe. The Al Ali (singular, Aliyi), were some 6,750 strong at the turn of the 19th century and were almost all settled either at Umm Al Quwain (1,000 families) or the inland town of Falaj Al Ali (later to be known as Falaj Al Mualla). Some 200 settled Al Ali families lived in Sharjah and 150 in Ras Al Khaimah, although there was also a small Bedouin section of some 140 families who roamed a dar between Jazirat Al Hamra and Falaj Al Ali. There was a Persian group of Al Ali, who referred to the Umm Al Quwain section as 'Al Mualla'. The tribe originated in Nejd.

== Founding Umm Al Quwain ==
The first known head of the Al Ali when they settled at Umm Al Quwain was Sheikh Rashid bin Majid Al Mualla. Sheikh Rashid was responsible for the construction of Umm Al Quwain Fort in the town in 1768, today home to Umm Al Quwain museum.

The fort and its watchtower were built after the Al Ali tribe moved from the island of Sinniyah to the mainland after water supplies on the island were exhausted.

== Rulers ==
The successive Al Mualla Rulers of Umm Al Quwain were:

- 1768 – 1820: Sheikh Rashid bin Majid Al Mualla
- 1820 – 1853: Sheikh Abdullah bin Rashid Al Mualla
- 1853 – 1873: Sheikh Ali bin Abdullah Al Mualla
- 1873 – 1904: Sheikh Ahmad bin Abdullah Al Mualla (b. 1844 – d. 1904)
- 1904 – 1922: Sheikh Rashid bin Ahmad Al Mualla (b. 1876 – d. 1922)
- 1922 – 1923: Sheikh Abdullah bin Rashid Al Mualla II
- 1923 – 1929: Sheikh Hamad bin Ibrahim Al Mualla
- 1929 – 1981: Sheikh Ahmad bin Rashid Al Mualla (b. 1904 – d. 1981)
- 1981 – 2009: Sheikh Rashid bin Ahmad Al Mualla II (b. 1932 – d. 2009)
- 2009 – present: Sheikh Saud bin Rashid Al Mualla (b. 1952)

== Deputy rulers ==
The successive Al Mualla Deputy Rulers of Umm Al Quwain are:

- 20 April 2004 – 4 June 2026: Sheikh Abdullah bin Rashid Al Mualla III (b. 1971)
- 4 June 2026 - Present: Sheikh Ahmed bin Saud bin Rashid Al Mu'alla
