= Abdullah bin Rashid Al Mualla II =

Ruler of Umm Al Quwain from 1922 to 1923

- Sheikh

Ruler of Umm Al Quwain
- Reign: 1922–1923
- Predecessor: Rashid bin Ahmad Al Mualla
- Successor: Hamad bin Ibrahim Al Mualla
- Died: 1923
- House: Al Mualla

Sheikh Abdullah bin Rashid Al Mualla II was Ruler of Umm Al Quwain from 1922 to 1923, one of the Trucial States, today the United Arab Emirates (UAE). His short rule was dominated by fears of a coup by his uncles and was brought to an abrupt end by the machinations of his cousin.

== Accession ==
Sheikh Rashid bin Ahmad died of pneumonia in August 1922. At the time only his mother and the family slaves were present and they acted quickly to get word to Rashid's eldest son, Abdullah, that his father had died. Abdullah, who was only 20 years old and who was himself travelling in Falaj Al Ali (today Falaj Al Mualla), rushed home and secured the house and Sheikdom, aware that his male relatives – particularly Rashid bin Ahmad's brothers, Ibrahim and Saeed, would likely contest the succession.

Abdullah sent a messenger to Mohammed Ali bin Huwaidan, the headman of the powerful Bedouin tribe, the Bani Qitab, who owed their loyalty to the house of Al Mualla and Mohammed Ali travelled to Umm Al Quwain with a force of some 100 men to guard the town. The move was inspired: Ibrahim bin Ahmad stayed at Falaj Al Ali and Saeed bin Ahmad fled to Ras Al Khaimah. Another possible claimant, Abdullah bin Saeed – who was married to Rashid bin Ahmad's daughter – stayed in Umm Al Quwain but was placed under house arrest. Abdullah himself maintained a house in Ras Al Khaimah.

Abdullah bin Rashid refused to allow his uncles to return to Umm Al Quwain, but Saeed bin Ahmad went to the British Residency Agent and complained. The agent, Isa bin Abdel Latif, travelled to Umm Al Quwain in October 1922 to try and mediate with Abdullah, but found the young man obstinate and fearful of his relatives. Abdel Latif also noted that Abdullah had alienated many members of the ruling family and that many people from Umm Al Qawain were travelling to meet Saeed, who had decamped to Ajman. The British Political Resident, Arthur Prescott Trevor, met with Saeed in March 1923 and was persuaded by his arguments that the Bani Qitab were stoking animosity and that he had been dispossessed by Abdullah bin Rashid.

The British Agent visited Umm Al Qawain in September and, finding Abdullah well established as Ruler, proceeded to take Abdullah's promise to abide by the treaties with the British. Abdel Latif urged Abdullah to settle with his family but he refused.

In October 1923, Abdullah's cousin, Hamad bin Ibrahim Al Mualla, set a slave from his household to murder Abdullah. Immediately following the funeral, Hamad bin Ibrahim outwitted the family and its guards and took over the government house, successfully proclaiming himself Ruler.
