= Rashid bin Ahmad Al Mualla =

Ruler of Umm Al Quwain from 1904 to 1922

- Sheikh

Ruler of Umm Al Quwain
- Reign: 1904–1922
- Predecessor: Ahmad bin Abdullah Al Mualla
- Successor: Abdullah bin Rashid Al Mualla II
- Born: 1876
- Died: 1922 (aged 45–46)
- House: Al Mualla

Sheikh Rashid bin Ahmad Al Mualla (1876–1922, Arabic: شيخ راشد بن أحمد المعلا) was the Ruler of Umm Al Quwain from 1904 to 1922, one of the Trucial States and today one of the seven emirates forming the United Arab Emirates (UAE). He gained influence over the tribes of the interior at the expense of the pre-eminent Trucial Ruler of the time, Sheikh Zayed bin Khalifa Al Nahyan.

== Accession ==
He acceded on 13 June 1904 following the death of his father, Sheikh Ahmad bin Abdulla Al Mualla. He wrote to the British Political Resident in September of that year, affirming his accession and accepting the treaty obligations entered into by his forebears. Soon after acceding, he married a daughter of the Ruler of Ajman – his Uncle (on his mother's side).

== Warring tribes ==
Rashid bin Ahmed was an astute politician and embarked on a campaign to enhance his influence among the Bedouin tribes, particularly the powerful Bani Qitab. This led, in 1905, to his involvement in a dispute which had broken out in the Wadi Hatta between the Na'im tribe and the Bani Qitab.

The town of Masfout in the Wadi Hatta was traditionally home to the Na'im, who were originally from Buraimi. The town abutted the Dubai exclave of Hatta, known then as Hajarain. They found themselves under threat when the Bani Qitab built a fort named Al Hauz in the wadi at a place known as Jabail and started to harass caravans passing through the pass to and from the Omani Batina coast. Rashid bin Ahmad Al Mualla backed the Bani Qitab in their adventure, even lending financial support, but a meeting was called of the five Trucial Sheikhs in September 1905, in Dubai, under the leadership of Sheikh Zayed bin Khalifa Al Nahyan, where it was agreed the fort at Jabail should be demolished and Masfout be restored to the Na'im.

Urged by Zayed bin Khalifa to stop interfering with the Bani Qitab and tribal politics, Rashid Bin Ahmad supported the Bani Qitab and although the Na'im retained Masfout, Rashid gained a role in the affairs of the Bedouin at Zayed's expense. This ascendancy continued the following year, when the Bani Qitab were in dispute with the Balush of Dhahirah, a tribe loyal both to the Bani Yas of Abu Dhabi and the Al Bu Falasah of Dubai.

The Bani Qitab attacked the Balush at their fort in Mazim with a number of lives lost. The Balush appealed to Sheikh Zayed bin Khalifa, who took up their cause, but he found himself once again opposed to Rashid bin Ahmad, who supported the Bani Qitab. Rashid bin Ahmed’s desert diplomacy now paid off, with Sharjah and Ajman joining with him in support of the Bani Qitab, while Zayed bin Khalifa opposed them. In February 1906, Zayed moved against the Bani Qitab in order to compel them to make restitution for their attacks and the killing of a number of Baluch. The Bani Qitab appealed to Maktoum bin Hasher Al Maktoum who, annoyed by their antics in Hajarain, backed Zayed. They then went to Saqr bin Khalid Al Qasimi, who refused to get involved. They eventually went to Rashid bin Ahmed, who was forced to support them, although clearly in dread of the fearsome Zayed bin Khalifa.

A general war was averted by a further meeting of the Trucial Sheikhs and those of the interior, held at Khawaneej outside Dubai, in April 1906. A treaty was agreed, allocating responsibility for the tribes to the two Rulers – Rashid Bin Ahmad was to be responsible for the Bani Qitab, Ghafalah and Bani Ka’ab, while Zayed undertook responsibility for the Na’im of Buraimi, the Dhawahir, the Sharqiyin of Fujairah and the Shihuh. The Balush went on to accept the blandishments of Muscat when oil companies started prospecting in their dar or district and Dhahirah is, as a consequence, today part of Oman.

== British intervention ==
However, Zayed wasn't to suffer Rashid Bin Ahmad gladly and in November 1906 he allied with Dubai and Sharjah and raised a force of Manasir and Bani Hajer Bedouin and prepared to attack Umm Al Quwain’s inland desert town of Falaj Al Mualla. Seemingly out of the blue, in January 1907, Rashid bin Ahmad was overpowered during one of his visits to Zayed and held prisoner inland of Sharjah town (likely at Dhaid), where the Rulers of Dubai, Ajman and Sharjah had joined Khalifa bin Zayed and were preparing their move against Falaj Al Ali.

In February 1907, the Political Resident in Bushire, Percy Cox, was drawn into the conflict and HMS Lawrence was moored off Sharjah to reinforce Cox's mediation. Rashid bin Ahmad was delivered up to Cox after a week's negotiations, much the worse for wear after his time in captivity, having been rather badly beaten up.

As in so many cases in the Trucial States, a relatively small incident boiled into preparations for war when a Somali sailor was killed in Ras Al Khaimah in 1919. The culprits escaped to Umm Al Quwain, where Rashid bin Ahmad gave them refuge. Sheikh Sultan bin Salim Al Qasimi of Ras Al Khaimah sent men to patrol Umm Al Quwain's border in case the men should try and move, and Rashid bin Ahmad sent them instead by sea to vandalise Jazirat Al Hamra, where a number of huts were burned by them. Other rulers aligned behind the two parties and the British Political Resident intervened to avert war. Under pressure from the friends of the murdered sailor and the British alike, Sultan bin Salim eventually paid the diya (blood money) to the sailor's family.

== Death ==
Sheikh Rashid bin Ahmad Al Mualla died of pneumonia in August 1922, leading to a period of disputed succession of seven years' duration.
