= Ali bin Abdullah Al Mualla =

Ruler of Umm Al Quwain from 1853 to 1873

- Sheikh

Ruler of Umm Al Quwain
- Reign: 1862–1868
- Predecessor: Abdullah bin Rashid Al Mualla
- Successor: Ahmad bin Abdullah Al Mualla
- Died: 1873
- House: Al Mualla

Sheikh Ali bin Abdullah Al Mualla was Ruler of Umm Al Quwain from 1853 to 1873, one of the Trucial States which today form the United Arab Emirates (UAE).

The date of commencement of his rule is uncertain, but it has generally been accepted as starting the year his father, Abdullah, signed the 1853 Perpetual Maritime Truce. Ali ratified the 1856 'Further engagement for the suppression of the slave trade' as well as, in 1864, a treaty underwriting the protection of the British telegraph line and stations.

Ali bin Abdullah presided over a largely peaceful period in Umm Al Quwain's often turbulent history, even resisting imprecations from Thuwaini bin Said, Sultan of Muscat and Oman, who wanted to ally Abu Dhabi and Umm Al Quwain against Sultan bin Saqr of Sharjah (who had earned himself a rebuke from the British over his intrigues against Thuwaini). This policy endured even when other Trucial leaders gave their support to Thuwaini, the Battle of Dhank in October 1870 ranged Abu Dhabi, Dubai, Ajman and Ras Al Khaimah – as well as the Bani Qitab and Na'im, with the Sultan, but not Umm Al Quwain.

One area of contention between Umm Al Quwain and Sharjah was the island of Abu Musa, claimed by both rulers. Ali bin Abdullah sent a number of boats to the island to seize Salim bin Sultan’s herd of horses but was met by a force of Sharjah boats. The conflict continued to smoulder and Ajman joined with Sharjah, while Hamriyah (always keen to take action against Sharjah), backed Umm Al Quwain.

Having led a mostly peaceful life, he died a peaceful death in 1873 and was succeeded by his younger brother, Ahmad bin Abdullah Al Mualla.
