= Exclusive Agreement =

1892 Treaty

The Exclusive Agreement of 1892 was a treaty signed between the British and the Rulers of the Sheikhdoms of the Lower Gulf, then known as the Trucial States and today the United Arab Emirates.

The treaty bound the Rulers of the Trucial States to the British government, to deal only with the British and not to make any agreements regarding land or territorial rights with any foreign power. It effectively cemented the status of the Trucial States as a British protectorate, although did not formally confer protectorate status on the Sheikhdoms, a status the British were to withhold until they announced the unilateral abrogation of all of the treaties they entered into with the Trucial States on 16 January 1968.

The revocation of all of these treaties formally took place on the 1st December 1971, the day before the accession to the act of Union which would mark the foundation of the United Arab Emirates.

== Background ==
In the 1890s, the Trucial States offered little, if any, resource of strategic interest to Britain. Oil would not be discovered, or its possibility entertained, until the 1920s. Pearling, although at the time a lucrative industry, was not taxed and therefore offered no revenue to HMG. Any role of the Trucial States in providing protection for the British trade route to its imperial asset, India, was eclipsed by the opening of the Suez Canal in 1869 and the British acquisition of a controlling interest in the canal in 1882. It has been argued that the move to implement the Exclusive Agreement was therefore a purely instinctual reaction to increased interest being shown in the region by the French, Germans, Ottomans and Persians.

The first sign of direct Persian interest in acquiring a measure of influence over the Trucial States was in 1887, with the landing at Abu Dhabi of the former deputy Governor of Bushire, Sartip Haji Ahmad Khan. The British Resident at Bushire, Charles Edward Ross, tasked the Residency steamer, Lawrence, to track Ahmad Khan, who visited Abu Dhabi for a few days before travelling to Dubai and then leaving for Lingeh on a local vessel from Abu Dhabi. A colourful figure, Ahmad Khan wore full ceremonial uniform throughout his visit. British officials remained in the dark about his intentions until Rashid bin Maktoum Al Maktoum of Dubai confided in Turki bin Said, the Sultan of Muscat, telling him that Ahmad Khan had proposed that Persia would back the overthrow of the British.

Alarmed by this information, Ross in December 1887 obtained an agreement from the Rulers of Abu Dhabi, Dubai, Sharjah, Ajman, Umm Al Quwain and Ras Al Khaimah that they would not deal with any foreign government other than the British and would not allow any other government to establish a representative in their territories. Ahmad Khan once again attempted to visit the Trucial States, with a force of troops from Qeshm in January 1888, but was refused landing at Musandam and proceeded instead to Umm Al Quwain where he met the Ruler, the turbulent Ahmad bin Abdullah Al Mualla. Ahmad had already had a number of run-ins with the British and had been found to have breached the Perpetual Maritime Truce on a number of occasions, but rejected Ahmad Khan's approach.

A formal British complaint was subsequently made to Tehran, which disowned Ahmad Khan.

Two French nationals, suspected by the British of being agents, now visited Umm Al Quwain and were received cordially. Named Tramier and Chapuy, they distributed French flags, which allowed local traders to ferry contraband, including slaves from Africa, with impunity against British interdiction. News that Ahmad bin Abdullah had granted them land in Umm Al Quwain led to the new British Resident, Adelbert Talbot, drawing up a formal treaty based on the 1887 text of Ross' agreement and presenting this to the six Trucial Rulers and also to the Ruler of Bahrain. The treaty made the Trucial States a 'protectorate in all but name'.

== Treaty ==
The treaty consisted of a single page of text and three points and bound the Trucial Rulers ‘not to enter into any agreement or correspondence with any Power other than the British Government’ and that they would not, without permission from that government, ‘consent to the residence within my territory of the agent of any other government’. Furthermore, they would not ‘cede, sell, mortgage or otherwise give for occupation any part of my territory, save to the British Government.’ There was no reciprocal provision for the British to accept responsibility for the defence of the Trucial States.

The treaty was signed between 5 and 8 March 1892 by Zayed bin Khalifa Al Nahyan of Abu Dhabi; Humaid bin Rashid Al Nuaimi of Ajman; Ahmad bin Abdullah Al Mualla of Umm Al Quwain; Humaid bin Abdulla Al Qasimi of Sharjah; Rashid bin Maktoum Al Maktoum of Dubai and Saqr bin Khalid Al Qasimi of Ras Al Khaimah and on 14 March 1892 by Isa bin Ali Al Khalifa of Bahrain.

Fujairah would not accede to the Exclusive Agreement (and the other applying treaties) until 1952, when it was granted Trucial status by the British.
