= Ahmad bin Abdullah Al Mualla =

Ruler of Umm Al Quwain from 1873 to 1904

- Sheikh

Ruler of Umm Al Quwain
- Reign: 1873–1904
- Predecessor: Ali bin Abdullah Al Mualla
- Successor: Rashid bin Ahmad Al Mualla
- Died: 1904
- House: Al Mualla

Sheikh Ahmad bin Abdullah Al Mualla was the Ruler of Umm Al Quwain from 1873 to 1904. He led Umm Al Quwain through a turbulent period in the Trucial Coast's history, with conflicts against neighbouring emirates and almost constantly shifting alliances. On two occasions these conflicts led to him being found to breach the terms of the 1853 Perpetual Maritime Truce with the British.

This notwithstanding, he was a signatory to the 1892 Exclusive Agreement, which bound the Trucial Sheikhs and the British together in a protectorate.

== Accession ==
Ahmad bin Abdullah succeeded his elder brother, Ali. Ruling at a time when the coastal communities of the Persian Gulf were almost constantly in conflict, he was immediately involved in a fight with Sharjah over the island of Abu Musa. A force from Umm Al Quwain attempted to raid the island and remove the Ruler of Sharjah's horses from there, but was met by boats from Sharjah which had arrived first. The conflict eventually drew in Umm Al Quwain's neighbours, Ajman weighing in on Sharjah's side and Hamriyah on Umm Al Quwain's. The following year, Abu Dhabi joined the fray in opposition to Sharjah and inflicted a sharp defeat on Sharjah's forces under Sheikh Salim bin Sultan Al Qasimi, killing 50 men. Ras Al Khaimah now joined Sharjah and Dubai joined Umm Al Quwain and a general state of war engulfed the coast, despite attempts by the British Residency Agent to broker a peace.

The conflict came to a head in 1875, with a force from Dubai attacking Ras Al Khaimah and killing seven men. The headman of Hamriyah brokered a truce between Ahmad bin Abdullah of Umm Al Qawain and Salim bin Sultan of Sharjah in February 1875, but Dubai and Sharjah remained at war until September of that year.

== Breach of maritime truce ==
In 1879, Ahmad bin Abdulla signed the 'Mutual Agreement on Absconding Debtors' with the British, which aimed to curb the problem of debtors fleeing from one emirate to another and thereby evading their obligations.

Ahmad bin Abdullah conducted two dynastic marriages, the first to the daughter of the Ruler of Ajman, Sheikh Abdulaziz (to whom was born a son in 1876) and the second to the sister of the Ruler of Ras Al Khaimah, Sheikh Humaid bin Abdulla Al Qasimi. However, they divorced in 1882. In 1879, Ahmad bin Abdullah allied himself to Ajman and Ras Al Khaimah against Abu Dhabi and Sharjah. Open conflict was avoided, but Ahmad's divorce from the sister of Humaid bin Abdullah Al Qasimi of Ras Al Khaimah was acrimonious and resulted in disputes over property, which led Ahmad bin Abdullah to send seven boats to attack the Ras Al Khaimah dependency of Rams, which they did. This action constituted a breach of the Perpetual Maritime Truce of 1853 and Ahmad was consequently reprimanded by the British Resident Agent and compelled to pay a fine. However, the conflict continued to rage on land with Umm Al Quwain and Ajman pitted against Ras Al Khaimah and Sharjah. In January 1883 peace was brokered by Sheikh Zayed bin Khalifa of Abu Dhabi.

In May 1885, Ahmad bin Abdullah had a disagreement with his son, leading to the young man taking refuge in Ajman. When the Ruler of Ajman, Sheikh Rashid bin Humaid Al Nuaimi, refused to give the boy up, Ahmad bin Abdullah, supported by Sharjah, sent a force against Ajman, which landed at Al Heera. Once again found to be in breach of the 1853 Treaty, Ahmad bin Abdullah was visited by a representative of the Resident Agent aboard HMS Reindeer.

Raiding continued between the towns of the coast, however, and Hamriyah attacked Umm Al Quwain, only to have Ahmad bin Abdulla retaliate and sack Hamriyah, whose headman was only spared after he barricaded himself in his fort. In the following conflicts, a northern alliance was founded, with Sharjah, Ajman, Umm Al Quwain and Ras Al Khaimah generally pitted against their southern neighbours, Dubai and Abu Dhabi.

== 1892 exclusive agreement ==
Although both German and Turkish interests had attempted to maintain links to the Trucial Coast, it was to be the Persian former deputy Governor of Bushire, Sartip Haji Ahmad Khan, who took to lobbying the Trucial rulers in 1887, proposing an alliance with a view to ejecting the British. The British Political Resident at Bushire, Edward Charles Ross, moved in December 1887 to obtain the agreement of the rulers of Abu Dhabi, Dubai, Sharjah, Ajman, Umm Al Quwain and Ras Al Khaimah that they would not have dealings with any other government than the British and not allow any other government’s agent to reside in their territories.

In January 1888, Ahmad Khan arrived once again, this time backed by soldiers and carrying a cargo of Persian flags to gift to the liberated peoples of the Trucial Coast. He met with Ahmad bin Abdullah Al Mualla, whose frequent brushes with the British and their Maritime Treaty led Ahmad Khan to believe he would gain a receptive audience. This was not actually the case and the British complained to Tehran and the Persian adventure was drawn to a close, but it was it was the intrigues of two French figures (named Tramier and Chapay) who appear to have provoked the need for the British to embark on having the Trucial Sheikhs sign up to the 1892 Exclusive Agreement.

The two Frenchmen had, unlike Ahmad Khan, found a receptive audience in Ahmad bin Abdullah, having supplied him with French flags for Umm Al Quwain's ships to fly, allowing them to act independently of British interests and rulings. When reports reached the British Political Resident that the French had been granted a site at Umm Al Quwain, the British government in Bombay approved the signing of an 'Exclusive agreement' in May 1892, which bound the Trucial Sheikhs not to enter into 'any agreement or correspondence with any Power other than the British Government' and that without British assent, they would not 'consent to the residence within my territory of the agent of any other government' and that they would not 'cede, sell, mortgage or otherwise give for occupation any part of my territory, save to the British Government'.

== Death ==
Sheikh Ahmad bin Abdulla suffered from paralysis and was too infirm to travel to Sharjah for Curzon's Viceregal Durbar, held off Sharjah in November 1903. He died on 13 June 1904 and was succeeded by his son, Rashid, who had long been de facto ruler.
