= Khor Al Beidah =

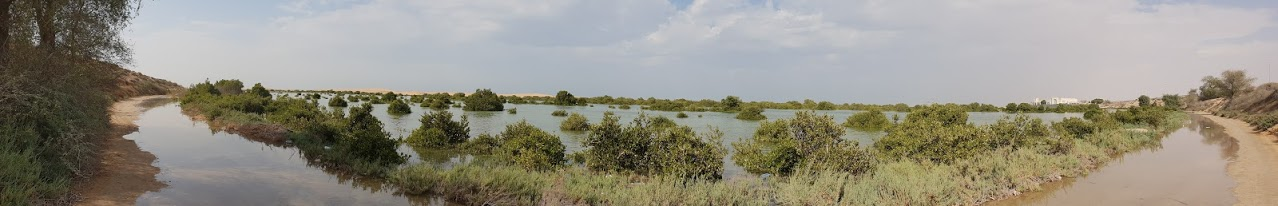
Khor al-Beidah wetland

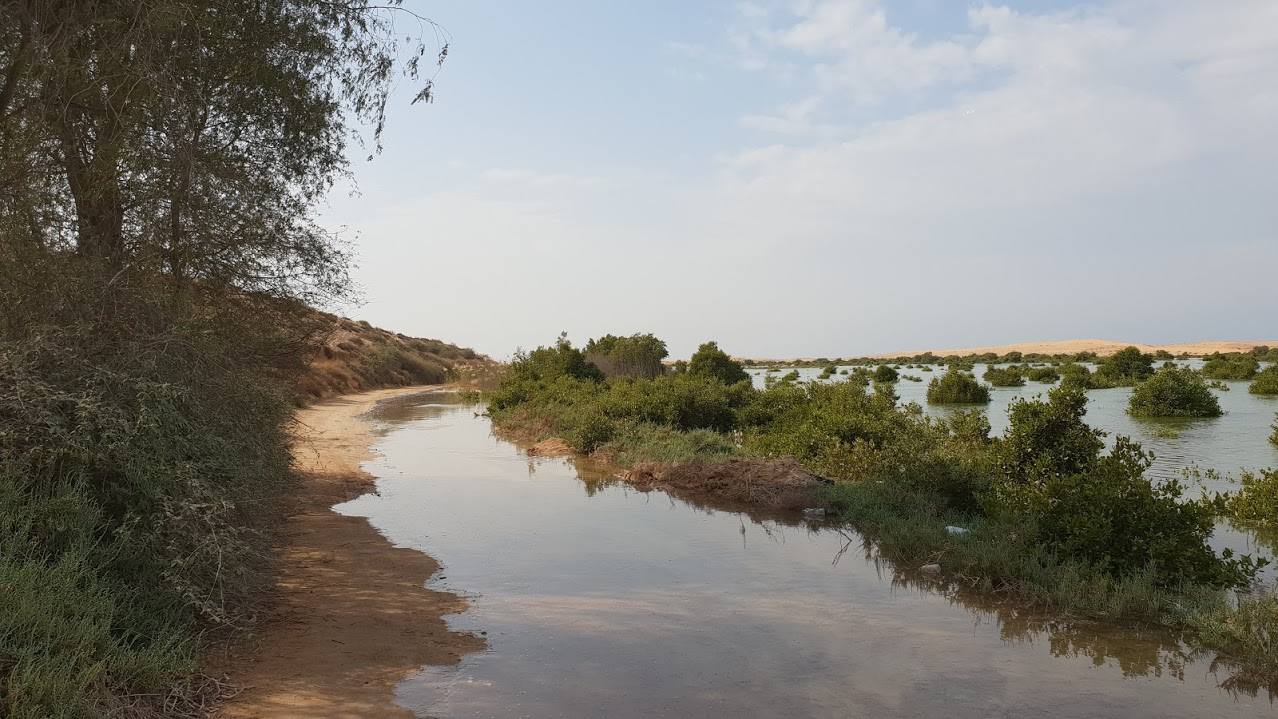

Khor al-Beida is a tidal wetland in the Emirate of Umm al Quwain. It hosts several species of crabs, mollusks and wintering shorebirds. The fragile ecosystem is under threat from illegal felling of Mangroves and real estate development.

Birdlife International and the UAE Ministry of Climate Change & Environment have listed Khor al-Beidah as an Important Bird Area (IBA).

More than 420 species have been recorded in this region and the region is largely left unprotected.

Location of Khor Al Beidah Wetland

== Bird species ==
- Western Reef Heron
- Kentish Plover
- Lesser Sand Plover
- Greater Sand Plover
- Great Knot
- Crab-plover
- More in this checklist
