= Rashid bin Majid Al Mualla =

Ruler of Umm Al Quwain from 1768 to 1820

- Sheikh

Ruler of Umm Al Quwain
- Reign: 1768–1820
- Successor: Abdullah bin Rashid Al Mualla
- House: Al Mualla

Sheikh Rashid bin Majid Al Mualla was the founder of the House of Al Mualla, currently the ruling family of Umm Al Quwain.

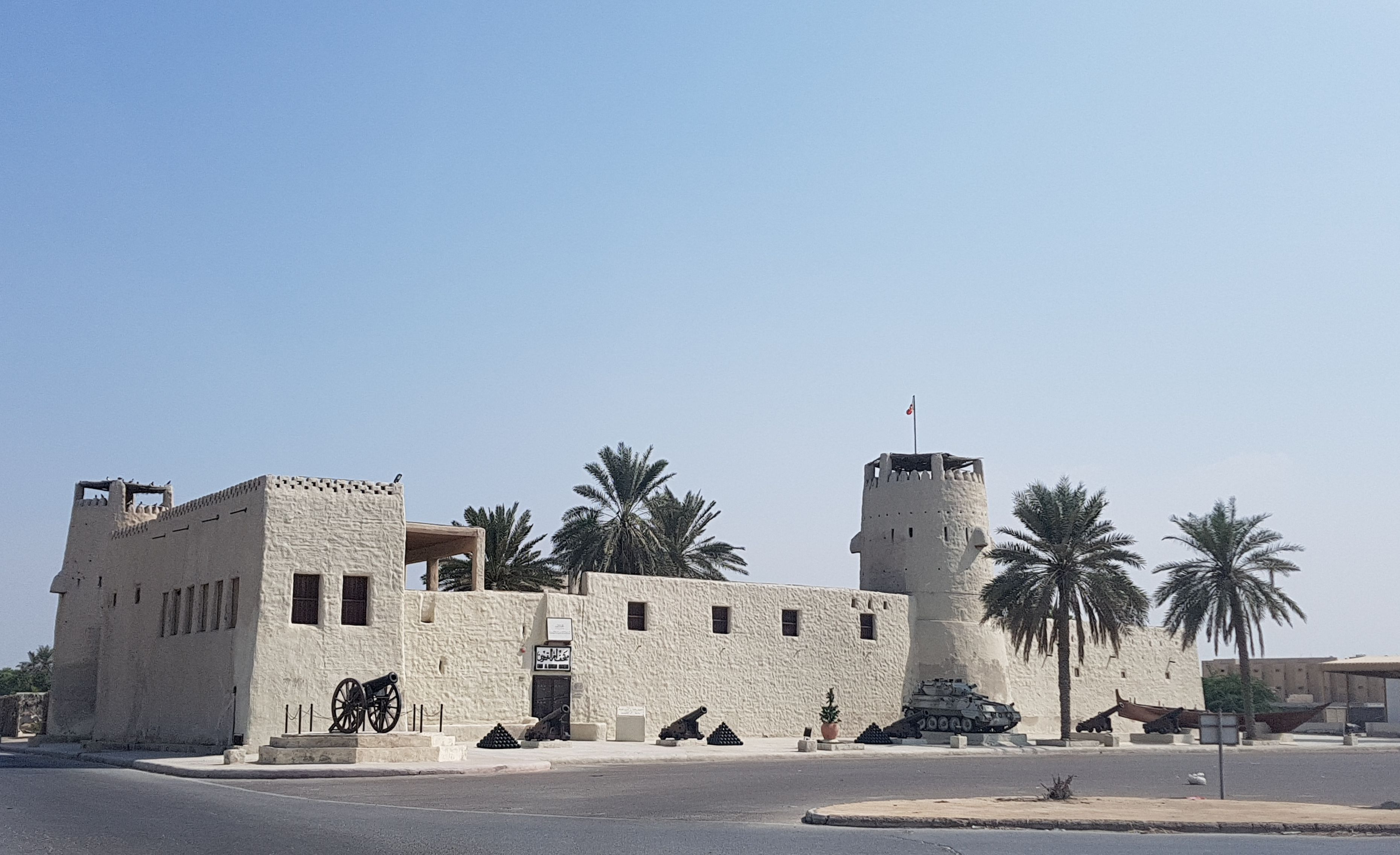
Umm Al Qawain fort today

The first known ruler of the Al Ali tribe of Umm Al Quwain, Sheikh Rashid was responsible for the construction of Umm Al Quwain Fort in the town in 1768, today home to Umm Al Quwain museum.

The fort and its watchtower were built after the Al Ali tribe moved from the island of Sinniyah to the mainland after water supplies on the island were exhausted.

The precise date of Rashid bin Majid's reign is unknown, but by 1820 he had been succeeded by his son, Sheikh Abdullah bin Rashid Al Mualla, the first Sheikh of Umm Al Quwain to enter into treaty relations with the British.
