= Umm Al Quwain Fort =

Fort in Umm Al Quwain, United Arab Emirates

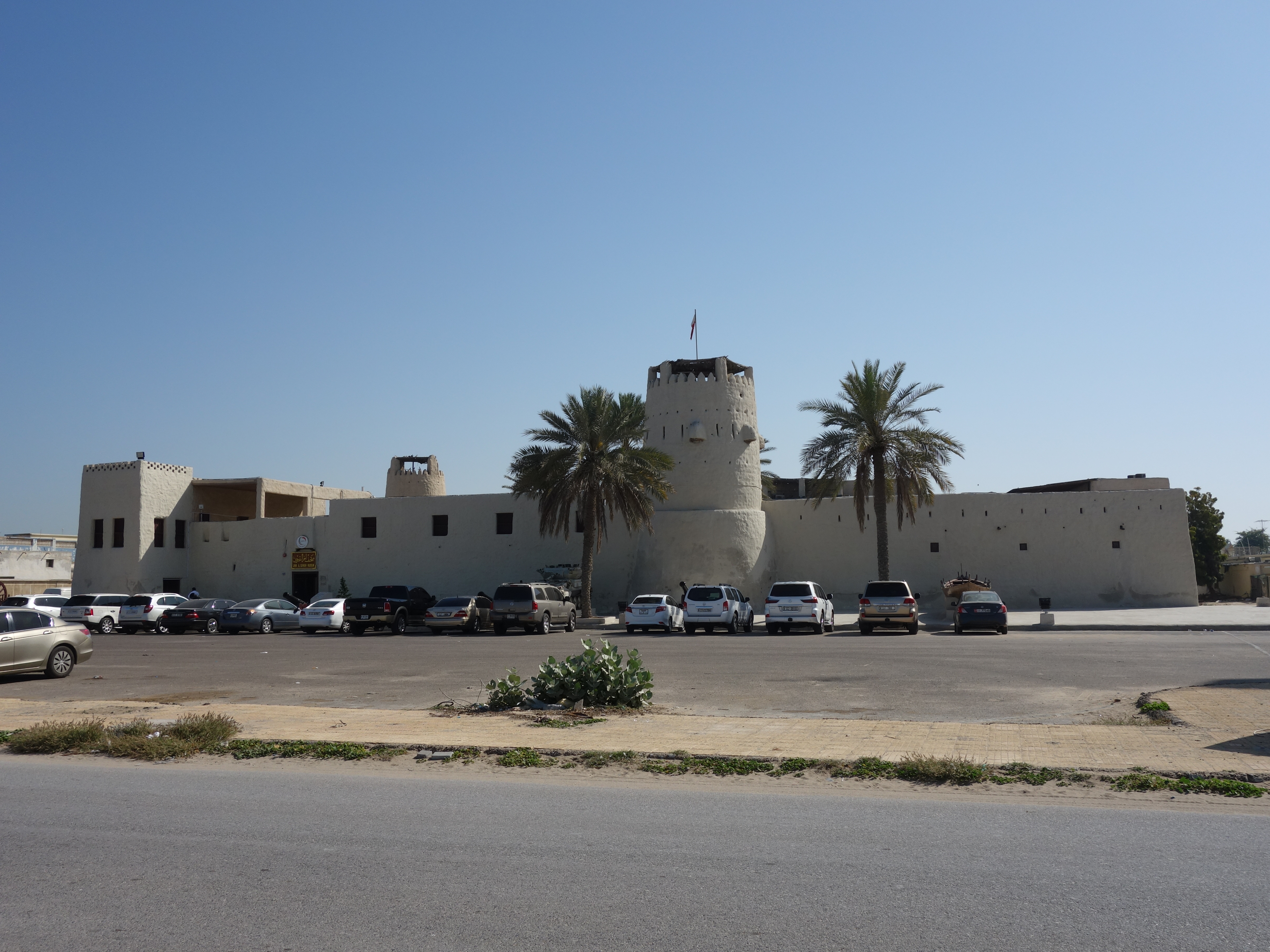
Umm Al Quwain Fort

Umm Al Quwain Fort, also known as the Al Ali Fort, is located in the city of Umm Al Quwain in the United Arab Emirates (UAE). It was the seat of the rulers of Umm Al Quwain and the centre of government in the emirate until 1969. It was used as a police station before the fort was restored and opened to the public in 2000 by Sheikh Rashid Bin Ahmed Al Mualla, the Ruler of Umm Al Quwain at the time.

Today it houses the Umm Al Quwain National Museum. Exhibits include artefacts from the important archaeological site of Ed-Dur.

The Fort is located in the Madeena Al Qadeema or old souq area of Umm Al Quwain, the most traditional remaining area of the emirate's capital.

== History ==
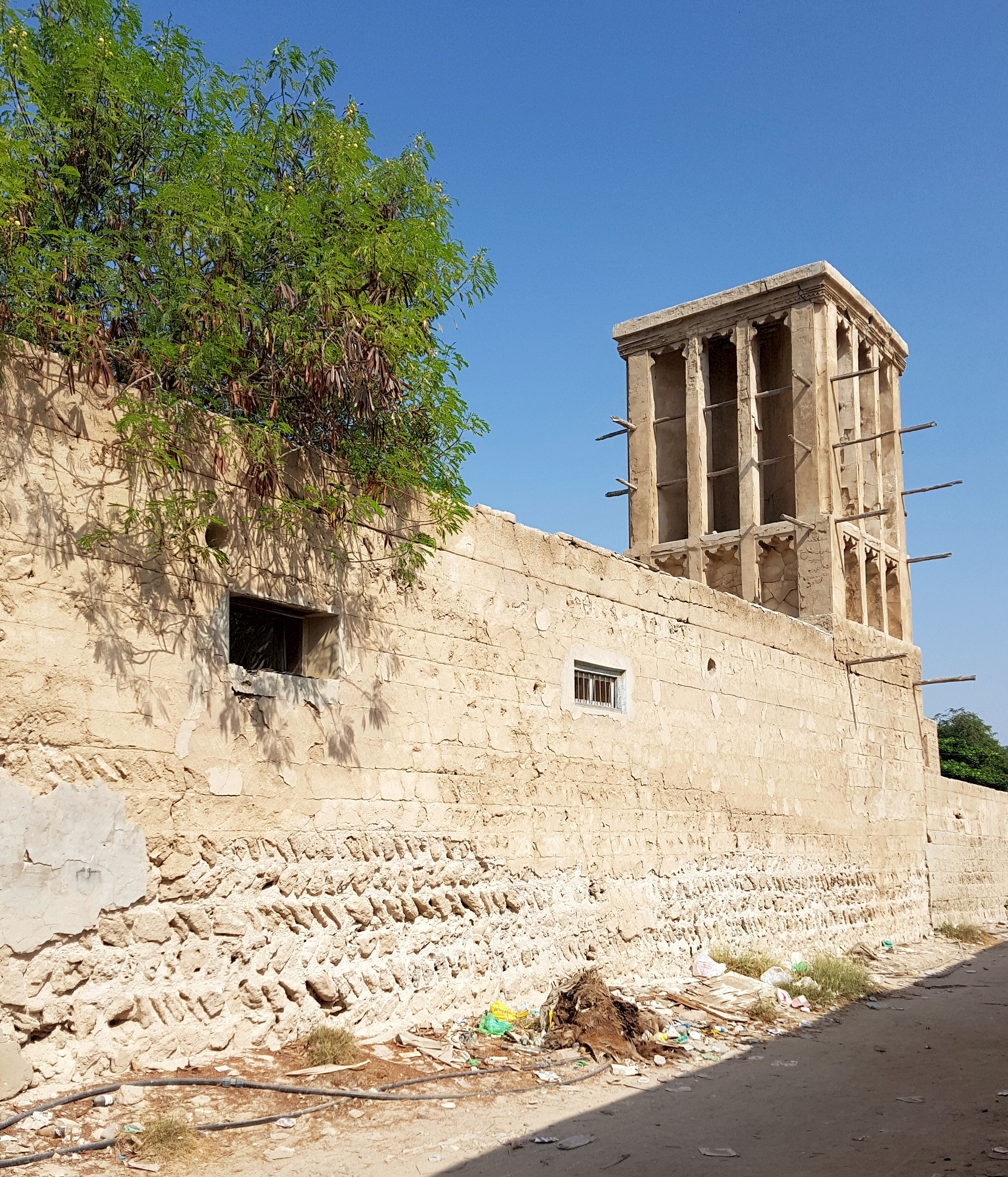
One of a number of surviving 'barjeels' or wind towers on older houses in the area behind Umm Al Quwain fort - the site of the original Al Ali settlement.

The Al Ali Fort was built in 1768 by the founder of the modern Al Mualla dynasty, Sheikh Rashid Bin Majid Al Mualla. Sheikh Hamad Bin Ibrahim Al Mualla, who himself had risen to power in questionable circumstances in 1923, was murdered in the fort in 1929 – shot and killed on 9 February that year by a slave called Saeed from the household of Hamad's blind uncle, Abdelrahman bin Ahmed Al Mualla.

Hamad was succeeded by Ahmad bin Rashid Al Mualla following a colourful incident whereby the population of the town rose up against Abdelrahman and Saeed, who had barricaded themselves in the fort. Abandoning their initial plan of firing on the fort with a cannon, the people of the town instead elected to set a fire around the walls of the fort and in this conflagration both Abrelrahman and Saeed were killed. Given that Abdulrahman, being blind, could not expect to be ruler, it was thought by the British that he was working for the benefit of a third party, possibly Sultan bin Saqr Al Qasimi of Sharjah, but nonetheless confirmed the young Ahmed as a Trucial Ruler.

=== Falaj Al Mualla Fort ===
A second fort in Umm Al Quwain, built in 1825, is to be found in the inland town of Falaj Al Mualla (previously known as Falaj Al Ali). Restored in a nine-year project, the fort opened to the public in 2015.
