= Umm Al Quwain Free Zone =

UAE free economic zone

Umm Al Quwain Free Trade Zone
- Company type: Developer and Operator
- Industry: Logistics, Warehousing, Economic Trade Zone, Real Estate, Property
- Founded: 1987
- Headquarters: Umm Al Quwain, United Arab Emirates
- Area served: Global
- Key people: Sheikh Khalid bin Rashid Al Mu'alla (Group Chairman); Johnson M. George (General Manager)
- Products: Business Centres, Office Space, Warehouses, Plots of Land and Retail Space

Umm Al Quwain Free Trade Zone is a free economic zone located in the emirate of Umm Al Quwain, United Arab Emirates. Created under a Ruler's Decree, Umm Al Quwain Free Trade Zone commenced operations in 1987. It functions under the administration of Saud bin Rashid Al Mualla.

== History ==
Umm Al Quwain Free Trade Zone is a developed Free Zone in Umm Al Quwain which is known for its desert landscape and unique flora and fauna.

UAQ FTZ is situated close to the UAE’s primary sea ports and in close proximity to Dubai International Airport and Sharjah International Airport. It has direct access to UAQ port.
