= Umm Al Quwain University =

University in the United Arab Emirates

- Established: 2012
- Founder: HH Sheikh Saud bin Rashid Al Mualla
- Accreditation: Commission for Academic Accreditation
- Location: Al Mualla Street, Umm Al Quwain, Emirate of Umm Al Quwain, United Arab Emirates; 25.46824°N 55.64031°E
- Website: uaqu.ac.ae

Umm Al Quwain University (UAQU) is a higher education institution in Umm Al Quwain, United Arab Emirates.

UAQU was founded in 2012 as the first university in the Emirate of Umm Al Quwain. It was initiated through Emirates Canadian University College, becoming a university, sponsored by HH Sheikh Saud bin Rashid Al Mualla, the Ruler of Umm Al Quwain.

The university is located on Al Mualla Street and has the following Colleges:

- College of Business Administration
- College of Arts and Science
- College of Mass Communication
- College of Law
