= Hamad bin Ibrahim Al Mualla =

Ruler of Umm Al Quwain from 1923 to 1929

- Sheikh

Ruler of Umm Al Quwain
- Reign: 1923–1929
- Predecessor: Abdullah bin Rashid Al Mualla II
- Successor: Ahmad bin Rashid Al Mualla
- Died: 1929
- House: Al Mualla

Sheikh Hamad bin Ibrahim Al Mualla was Ruler of Umm Al Quwain from 1923 to 1929, one of the Trucial States which today forms part of the United Arab Emirates (UAE).

== Accession ==
In October 1923, a slave from Hamad bin Ibrahim's household murdered the-then Ruler of Umm Al Quwain (and Hamad's cousin), Sheikh Abdullah bin Rashid Al Mualla II. Immediately following the funeral, Hamad out-smarted Abdullah's younger brother, Ahmad bin Rashid, and occupied the government house.

Hamad managed to balance the ensuing situation and made his peace with Ahmad bin Rashid as well as the families of Umm Al Quwain and, by the time the British Resident visited in March 1924, Hamad was clearly the accepted Ruler of the emirate.

Having given sanctuary to the deposed Ruler of Sharjah, Sheikh Khalid bin Ahmad Al Qasimi, Sheikh Hamad managed to avoid a conflict with the Ruler of Sharjah, Sheikh Sultan bin Saqr Al Qasimi, when Khalid bin Ahmad reached a settlement with Sultan which ceded the inland town of Dhaid to him. Unable to take possession of the town because armed Bedouin loyal to Sultan were still there (and Hamad bin Ibrahim being unwilling to have his own forces dragged into a conflict with the Bedouin of the Interior), Khalid managed to broker an association between the Sheikhs of the Bani Qitab and Khawatir Bedouin tribes along with the Ruler of Ras Al Khaimah, which would have him take and hold Dhaid 'on behalf of Khaled bin Ahmed'. To the relief of both Hamad bin Ibrahim and his Northern neighbour, the plan (which would have potentially alienated Sultan of Sharjah) was not needed: Khaled took possession of Dhaid peacefully in July 1928.

== Death ==
Hamad was shot and killed on 9 February 1929, by a slave called Saeed from the household of Hamad's blind uncle, Abdelrahman bin Ahmed Al Mualla, acting under Abdelrahman's instigation. The population of the town rose up against Abdelrahman Bin Ahmed and Saeed, who had barricaded themselves in the fort. Abandoning their initial plan of firing on the fort with a cannon, the people of Umm Al Quwain instead elected to set a fire around the walls of the fort and in this conflagration both Abrelrahman and Saeed were killed. Hamad was then succeeded by his cousin, Ahmad bin Rashid Al Mualla.

The British considered the whole affair of Abdelrahman and Saeed to be highly suspicious and suspected Sultan bin Saqr Al Qasimi of Sharjah of involvement, but confirmed the young Ahmed as a Trucial Ruler nonetheless.
