= Ahmad bin Rashid Al Mualla =

Ruler of Umm Al Quwain from 1929 to 1981

- Sheikh
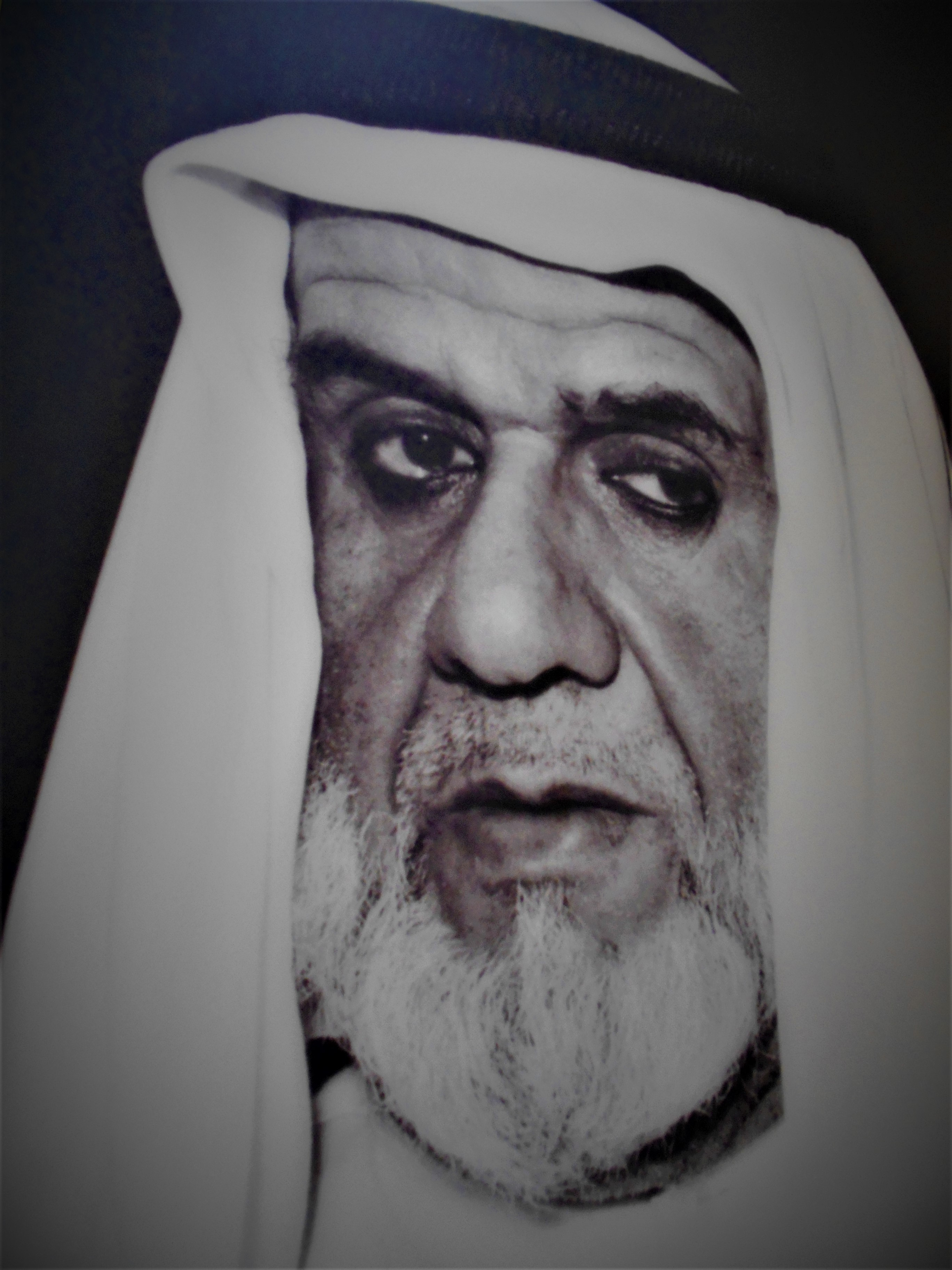

Ruler of Umm Al Quwain
- Reign: 1928–1981
- Predecessor: Hamad bin Ibrahim Al Mualla
- Successor: Rashid bin Ahmad Al Mualla II
- Born: 1902
- Died: 21 February 1981 (aged 78–79)
- Issue: Rashid bin Ahmad Al Mualla II
- House: Al Mualla

Sheikh Ahmad bin Rashid Al Mualla (1902 – 21 February 1981) was an Emirati royal, politician, and a founder of the United Arab Emirates who served as the ruler of the emirate of Umm Al Quwain from 1929 to 1981. He is the father of Sheikh Rashid bin Ahmad Al Mualla II. He assumed his position after the assassination of his cousin, Sheikh Hamad bin Ibrahim Al Mualla and counter-coup in 1929. In his old age, the emirate joined the federation of the UAE in 1971. The first school and hospital in the emirate was established in his time.
