= Rashid bin Ahmad Al Mualla II =

Ruler of Umm Al Quwain from 1981 to 2009

- Sheikh

Ruler of Umm Al Quwain
- Reign: 1981–2009
- Predecessor: Ahmad bin Rashid Al Mualla
- Successor: Saud bin Rashid Al Mualla
- Born: 1932
- Died: 2 January 2009 (aged 76–77); London
- House: Al Mualla

Sheikh Rashid bin Ahmad Al Mualla II (Arabic: الشيخ راشد بن احمد المعلا) (1932 – 2 January 2009) was the ruler or head of state of Umm Al Quwain from 1981 to 2009. His reign commenced when he succeeded his father, Sheikh Ahmad bin Rashid Al Mualla on 21 February 1981.

He died on 2 January 2009, in London. A week-long national mourning was declared, and flags flew at half staff during that period. His son Saud bin Rashid Al Mualla succeeding his father, became the ruler of Umm Al Quwain on 2 January 2009.
