= Perpetual Maritime Truce =

1853 maritime treaty

The Perpetual Maritime Truce of 1853 was a treaty signed between the British and the Rulers of the Sheikhdoms of the Lower Gulf, later to become known as the Trucial States and today known as the United Arab Emirates. The treaty followed the effective subjugation of the Qawasim (singular Al Qasimi) maritime federation and other coastal settlements of the Lower Gulf by British forces following the Persian Gulf campaign of 1819, a punitive expedition mounted from Bombay which sailed against Ras Al Khaimah, and which resulted in the signing of the General Maritime Treaty of 1820.

The Perpetual Maritime Truce was conceived by the British Political Resident in the Persian Gulf Colonel Samuel Hennell following a series of seasonal treaties intended to preserve peace at sea between the coastal communities of the region during the annual pearling season and was signed in August 1853 by the Rulers of the area during meetings at Basidu on the island of Qeshm and at Bushire. It was enacted by Hennell's successor, Arnold Burrowes Kemball.

== Background ==
After decades of incidents where British shipping had fallen foul of the Qawasim, an aggressive Arab maritime force that was opposed to British hegemony in the Persian Gulf, an expeditionary force embarked from Bombay, at the behest of the British East India Company, for Ras Al Khaimah in 1809. The force bombarded, but did not invade, Ras Al Khaimah. This campaign led to the signing of a peace treaty between the British and Hussan Bin Rahmah Al Qasimi, the leader of the Qawasim. Following the breakdown of that arrangement in 1815 and a number of maritime incidents, in November 1819, the British embarked on a further punitive expedition against the Qawasim, led by Major-General William Keir Grant, sailing to Ras Al Khaimah with a force of 3,000 soldiers. The British extended an offer to their ally (and the bitter enemy of the Qawasim) Said bin Sultan of Muscat to assist them in their expedition. Obligingly, he sent a force of 600 men and two ships.

Following the invasion and sacking of Ras Al Khaimah and Rams and the taking of the fort at Dhayah, the British expeditionary force then blew up the town and established a garrison of 800 sepoys and artillery, before visiting Jazirat Al Hamra, which was found to be deserted. They went on to bombard and destroy the fortifications and larger vessels of the coastal communities of Umm Al Quwain, Ajman, Fasht, Sharjah, Abu Hail, and Dubai. Ten vessels that had taken shelter in Bahrain were also destroyed. The Royal Navy suffered no casualties during the action.

The General Maritime Treaty of 1820 followed, initially signed by the rulers of Abu Dhabi, Sharjah, Ajman, Umm Al Quwain and the deposed Sheikh of Ras Al Khaimah (who signed as Sheikh of Khatt and Falaya) and Great Britain in January 1820. Bahrain acceded to the treaty in the following February. The treaty prohibited piracy in the Persian Gulf, banned slavery and required all usable ships to be registered with British forces by flying distinctive red and white flags which exist today as the flags of the respective emirates.

== Seasonal maritime treaties ==
In 1829, a series of long-running conflicts broke out between Abu Dhabi and its northern neighbours, principally involving Sharjah and Ras Al Khaimah and later the newly secessionist town of Dubai. These culminated in a blockade of Abu Dhabi by the Rulers of Ras Al Khaimah, Ajman and Lingeh in 1833. A short-lived peace was arranged, followed by a more enduring arrangement in 1834 under which Abu Dhabi agreed that the people of Dubai should be subjects of Sharjah.

The conflict, the most enduring and damaging so far of any between the coastal communities of the Persian Gulf, prepared the ground for the Perpetual Maritime Truce of 1853, commencing with a series of treaties negotiated by the British to cover a truce for the annual pearling season, which took effect from 1835 onwards. Hennell conceived the idea of a maritime truce between the Gulf Sheikhdoms which would cement the provisions already agreed in the 1820 General Maritime Treaty. The new treaty would run for the pearling season, between May and November and bind all of the Rulers to avoid hostilities at sea, give full redress for any infractions committed by their subjects, avoid retaliation but report incidents to the Resident, let the Resident know if any hostilities were intended at the end of the truce and in turn obliged the Resident to enforce the truce and act to obtain reparations for any injuries inflicted by one Ruler's subjects on another's.

The treaty effectively made the British the chief broker of peace in the region and was received with enthusiasm during a meeting at Basidu on the island of Qeshm, between Sultan bin Saqr Al Qasimi, Ruler of Ras Al Khaimah and Sharjah and Shakhbut bin Dhiyab Al Nahyan, Ruler of Abu Dhabi. The two Rulers approved of the idea and Hennell invited Obeid bin Said bin Rashid of Dubai and Rashid bin Humaid Al Nuaimi of Ajman to join them. The Truce as proposed by Hennell was signed by all four Rulers in Bushire on the 21 August 1835. Umm Al Quwain at the time was subject to Ras Al Khaimah and so did not sign independently. Although signed in August, the Treaty bound its signatories from May 1835 to November 1835, so ensuring peace at sea during the economically important annual pearling season.

Hennell reported that news “came in from all quarters of the joy and satisfaction diffused amongst the inhabitants of the whole line of the Arabian Coast of the Gulf on the intelligence reaching them of the establishment of the Truce.”

== Perpetual Truce ==
Celebrated as a great success, Hennell's seasonal truce was to be renewed in subsequent years, becoming a year-round agreement from 1838 onwards rather than purely a pearling season arrangement. The series of truces led to the signatory Sheikhdoms of the Lower Gulf becoming referred to as the 'Trucial States'. On 1 June 1843, a ten-year treaty was signed by the rulers.

The Perpetual Maritime Truce of 4 May 1853 was then agreed upon. The perpetual truce prohibited any act of aggression at sea and was signed by Abdulla bin Rashid Al Mualla of Umm Al Quwain; Humaid bin Rashid Al Nuaimi of Ajman; Saeed bin Butti of Dubai; Saeed bin Tahnun Al Nahyan ('Chief of the Beniyas') and Sultan bin Saqr Al Qasimi ('Chief of the Joasmees'). Although it was to be the culmination of Hennell's diplomacy and peace-making between the Trucial Rulers, the perpetual treaty was actually signed on the British side by Hennell's former deputy and successor, Arnold Burrowes Kemball. Three of the signatory Rulers signed as 'Chief' of their towns (Umm Al Quwain, Ajman and Dubai) and two, Saeed bin Tahnoon and Sultan bin Saqr signed as head of their tribes - the Bani Yas and Qawasim respectively.

Although a number of maritime incidents took place following the conclusion of the 1853 treaty, these were mostly associated with the side effects of conflicts in the interior or coastal towns rather than being intentional acts of maritime brigandage. The language in British reports changes at this time, referring to maritime conflicts as 'irregularities' rather than routinely ascribing any maritime event to piracy.

The treaty effectively established a British protectorate on the Trucial Coast, the Rulers all agreeing to escalate any disputes or acts of aggression to the British Resident, who was resident in Sharjah, or the 'Commodore at Bassidore' and submit to their judgement. That protectorate, greatly reinforced by the Exclusive Agreement of 1892, was to last until British withdrawal from the Trucial States in 1971 and the foundation of the United Arab Emirates on 2 December 1971.

== Further codicils ==
A number of codicils were added to the 1853 treaty. A codicil was added in 1856 for the suppression of the slave trade.

In 1864, another codicil was appended to the treaty to provide protection to the British telegraph line and the outstation at Telegraph Island. The cable was only briefly in use, from 1865 until 1868, when it was abandoned in favour of a new line laid between Aden and Bombay.

The issue of absconding debtors was a frequent source of conflict on the coast, with a combination of tribal movements triggered by indebtedness (the Qubaisat tribe was known to flee to Khor Al Udaid when in trouble) and individuals such as pearlers who had suffered a bad season and who would then hop to the next town to avoid their debts, often bringing their boats with them.

Not infrequently, coastal Rulers would welcome an increase to their fleet and ignore the fury from their neighbouring towns - especially in times of internecine conflict. The result was all too often escalation into wider conflict.

On 25 June 1879, the agreement for the ‘mutual surrender of fraudulently absconding debtors’ was concluded by the Trucial Rulers together with the British Residency Agent in Sharjah, Haji Abdulrahman and the Residency Munshi who was despatched from Bushire to ensure the treaty was understood and accepted by all. It levied a fine of fifty Thalers on any Ruler harbouring a debtor, which rose to 100 Thalers if the debtor subsequently took to the seas for the pearling season. Any dispute was to be settled by the Ruler's majlis and it was agreed that no fine would be exacted without the approval of the British Resident.
