= Saud bin Rashid Al Mualla =

Ruler of Umm Al Quwain

Saud bin Rashid Al Mualla سعود بن راشد المعلا
- Sheikh

Ruler of Umm Al Quwain
- Reign: 2 January 2009 – present
- Predecessor: Rashid bin Ahmad Al Mualla II
- Heir apparent: Rashid bin Saud bin Rashid Al Mualla
- Born: Saud Al Mualla; 1 October 1952 (age 74)
- Spouse: Sheikha Sumaya bint Saqr Al Qasimi
- House: Al Mualla
- Father: Rashid bin Ahmad Al Mualla II
- Mother: Hessa bint Humaid bin Abdul Rahman Al Shamsi

Sheikh Saud bin Rashid Al Mualla (Arabic: سعود بن راشد المعلا, romanized: Saʿūd bin Rāshid al-Muʿallā; born 1 October 1952) is the ruler and head of state of the Emirate of Umm Al Quwain since 2009 and a member of the Federal Supreme Council of the United Arab Emirates.

He is the son of Rashid bin Ahmad Al Mualla II and succeeded his father as monarch of Umm Al Quwain on 2 January 2009.

== Early life and education ==
Born on 1 October 1952, Sheikh Saud received his elementary and primary education in Umm Al Quwain before attending high school in Lebanon. He graduated with a degree in economics from Cairo University, Egypt in 1974, majoring in economics.

== Political career ==
Sheikh Saud was the Commander of the Umm Al Quwain National Guard with the rank of colonel. In 1989 he headed the Umm Al Quwain Royal Court (Al Diwan Al-Amir). Then, on 22 June 1982, his father Sheikh Rashid bin Ahmad Al Mualla II designated him to be the Crown Prince of Umm Al Quwain. He assisted his father in managing the emirate's affairs, oversaw many investment projects and established numerous government entities and local enterprises.

He was appointed to the United Arab Emirates foreign ministry in 1973 and seconded at the Umm Al Quwain Amiri court. He was appointed Commander of the Umm Al Quwain Amiri guard in 1977. In 1979, he was appointed chief of the Umm Al Quwain Amiri court (Diwan) and became crown prince in 1982.

In 2006, he launched the first joint offshore gas project with the government of Ras Al Khaimah.

== Personal life ==
Sheikh Saud is married to Sheikha Sumaya bint Saqr Al Qasimi who is sister to Saud bin Saqr Al Qasimi, ruler of Ras Al Khaimah. Their son Rashid is crown prince of Umm Al Quwain.

== See also ==
- Al Ali
