= Al Ali (tribe) =

Bedouin tribe of the United Arab Emirates

The Al Ali (Arabic: آل علي; singular Al-Aleeli Arabic: العليلي) is a tribe of the Arabian Peninsula, notably in the United Arab Emirates. The tribe originally settled the island of Siniyah off Umm Al Quwain, later moving to the mainland and building a fort and defensive wall there in the late 1700s, founding the Emirate of Umm Al Quwain (later a Trucial State and then one of the United Arab Emirates). The emirate consists in the main of the coastal city of Umm Al Quwain and the inland oasis town of Falaj Al Mualla, some 30 km (19 miles) from the coast.

Umm Al Quwain was distinguished among the Trucial States by the predominance of the Al Ali, who also constituted the tribe of the ruling family, Al Mualla. This contrasted with neighbouring Ajman, where the ruling family originated from a section of the Na'im, which constituted a minority among the local population.

The tribe was recorded by historian JG Lorimer as comprising 1,000 settled families in Umm Al Quwain, 200 in Sharjah and 150 in Ras Al Khaimah as well as some 140 nomadic families. The inland settlement of Falaj Al Ali was also fortified, including a trio of watchtowers (Murabbaa) which dominate the wide and fertile wadi there. This settlement later became known, after the ruling family, as Falaj Al Mualla.

According to Lorimer, approximately 5,000 Al Ali lived in the town of Umm Al Quwain, while the tribe also constituted the sole tribal population of Falaj Al Ali. The nomadic section inhabited the area between Umm Al Quwain and Jazirah Al Hamra and could support the ruler of Umm Al Quwain in times of conflict. The 1968 census recorded 2,862 Al Ali in Umm Al Quwain and 1,445 in Ras Al Khaimah, with a total recorded population of 5,058.

Historically, many Al Ali participated in the pearling industry. Despite Umm Al Quwain's maritime economy, only one seagoing merchant vessel was registered to the emirate in 1905. Most of the date plantations cultivated by Al Ali tribesmen were owned by members of the ruling family. The name Al Mualla was used for the ruling family and was also applied to the tribe by their kinsmen, the Arab Al Ali, who had settled in the Shibkuh district of Persia.

== Notable people ==
- Omar Al Ali, Emirati football referee
