= Falaj Al Mualla =

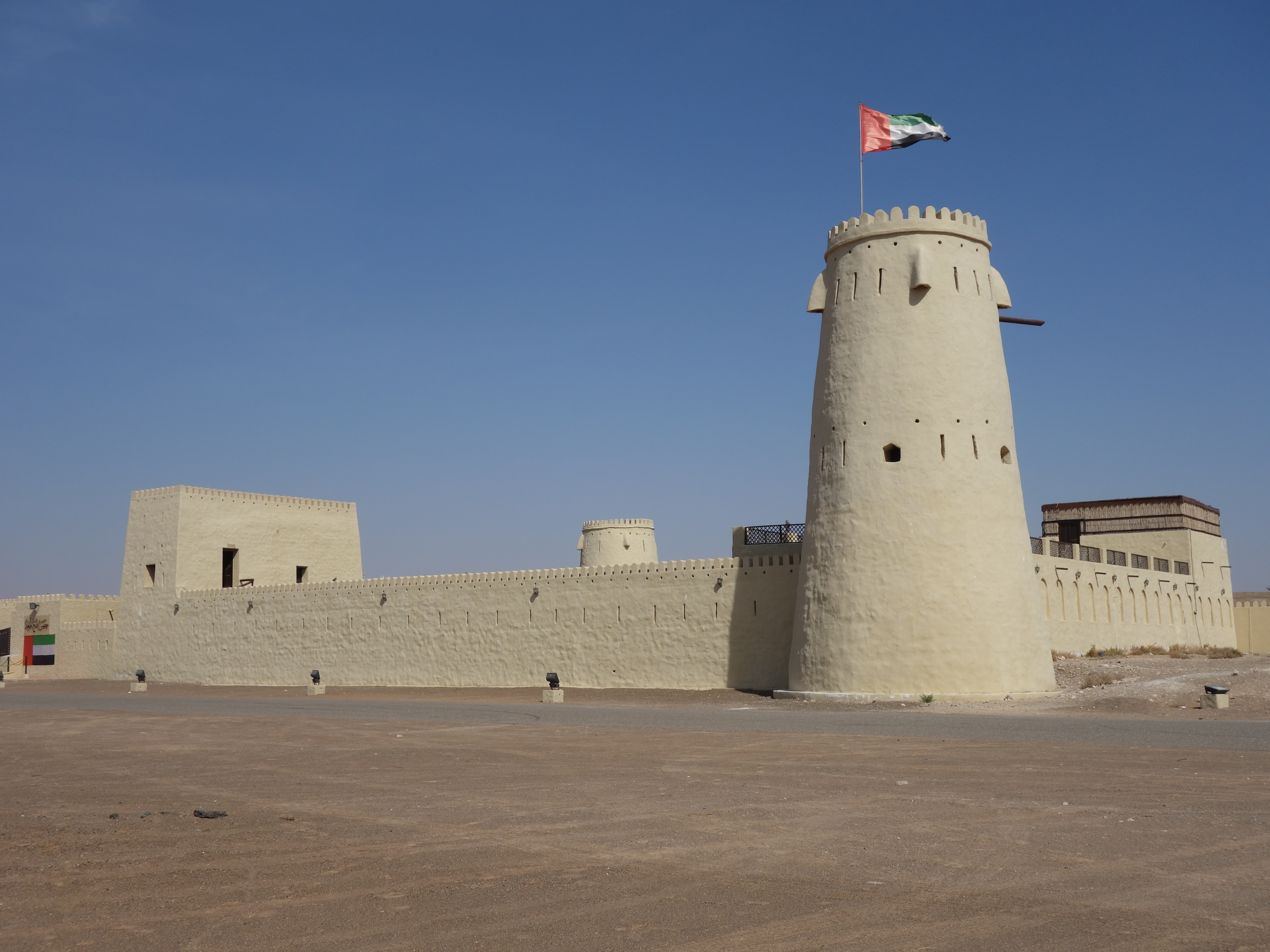
- Falaj Al Mualla Fort

- Location within United Arab Emirates
- Coordinates: 25°21′11″N 55°51′12″E
- Country: United Arab Emirates
- Emirate: Emirate of Umm Al Quwain
- Elevation: 82 m (269 ft)

Population (2015)
  - Total: 4,253

Falaj Al Mualla is the inland oasis town of Umm Al Quwain, one of the seven emirates which comprise the United Arab Emirates (UAE). Originally called Falaj Al Ali, after the Al Ali tribe which settled Umm Al Quwain, Falaj Al Mualla is located some 30 km inland of the city of Umm Al Quwain. It was settled approximately at the same time as the Al Ali moved from the island of Sinniyah to the mainland after water supplies on the island were exhausted.

Falaj Al Mualla is notable for its fort and also three watchtowers (east, west and north), which guard the fertile wadi. It is also the site of a bathing house, built in the early 19th century – as was the fort – by the Ruler of Umm Al Quwain, Abdullah bin Rashid Al Mualla. The construction of the fort has been dated back to 1825.

== History ==
The east and west towers underwent renovation in 2007 and restoration of the fort was started in 2009, a process completed in 2015. The bathing house was restored in 2014. The fort today houses Falaj Al Mualla museum.

== Date palms ==
A fertile area, irrigated by aquifers flowing down from the Hajar Mountains, Falaj Al Mualla has long been associated with farming, with some 60 families traditionally making a living from the 5,000 date palms in the oasis. The agricultural trial station at Digdaga, established in 1955, maintained five acres of experimental pasture in the area and Falaj Al Mualla was the site of the first poultry farm in the UAE.
