= Umm Al Quwain =

Capital and largest city of the Emirate of Umm Al Quwain, United Arab Emirates

Umm Al Quwain أم القيوين
- City
- Umm Al Quwain
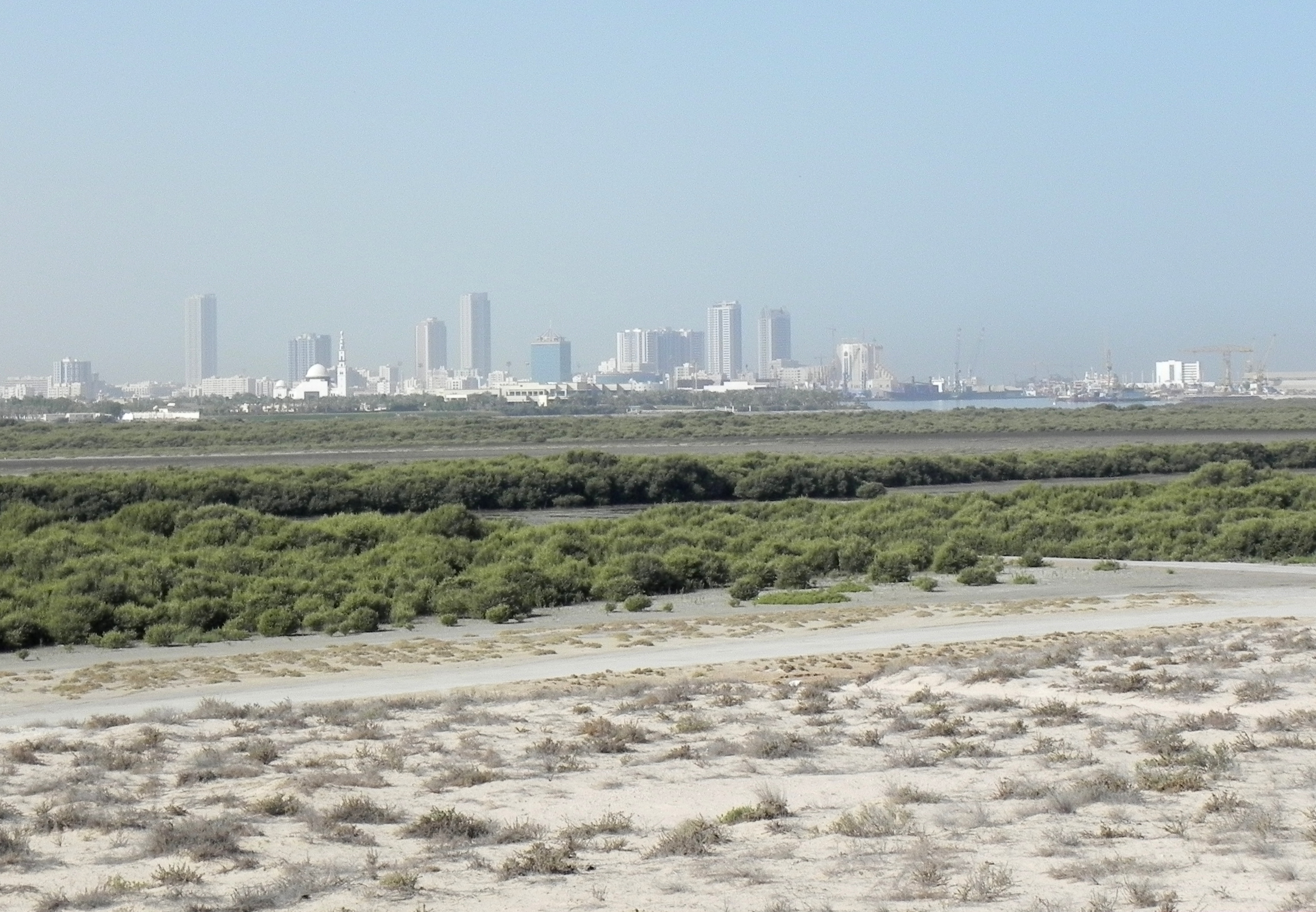
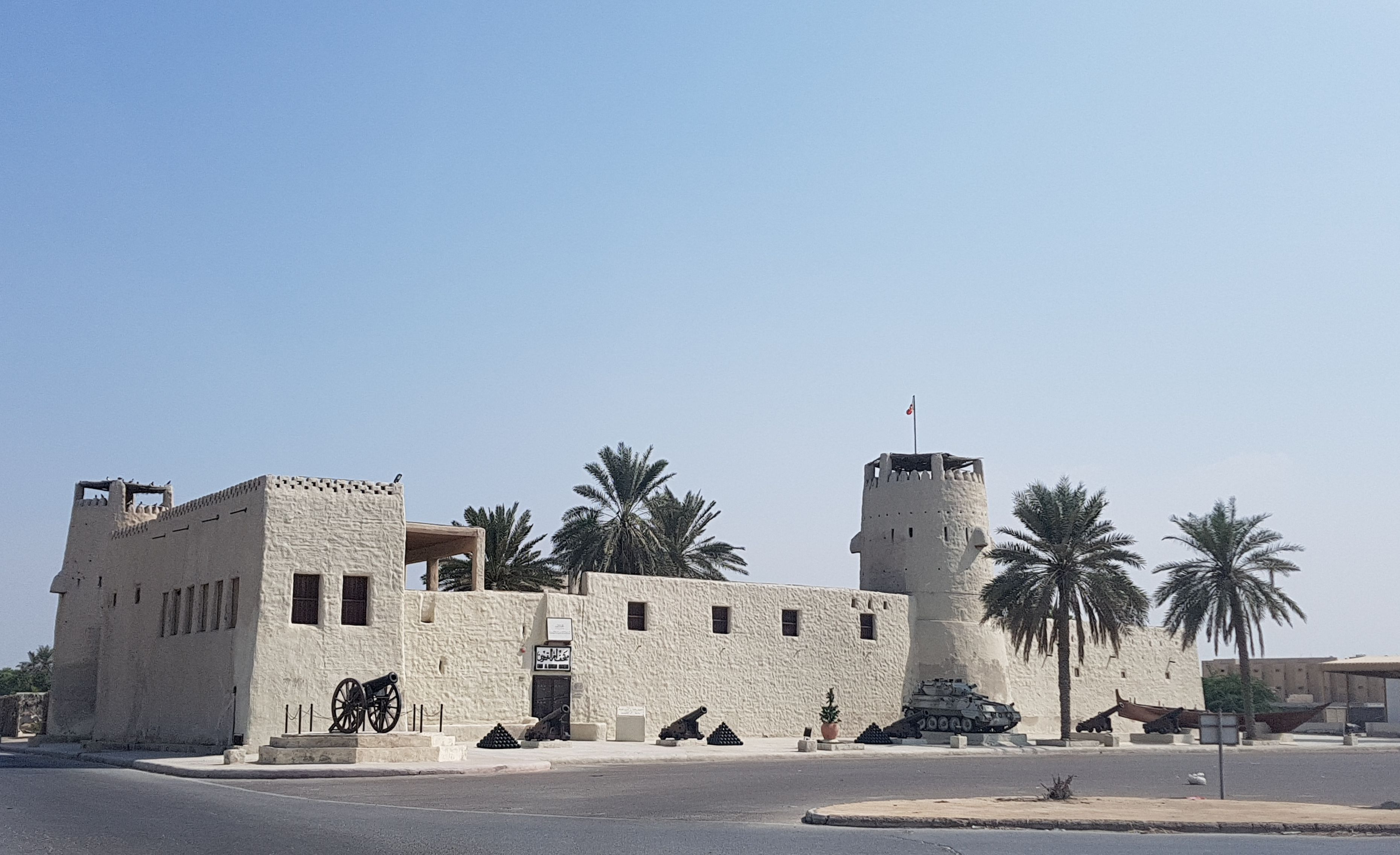
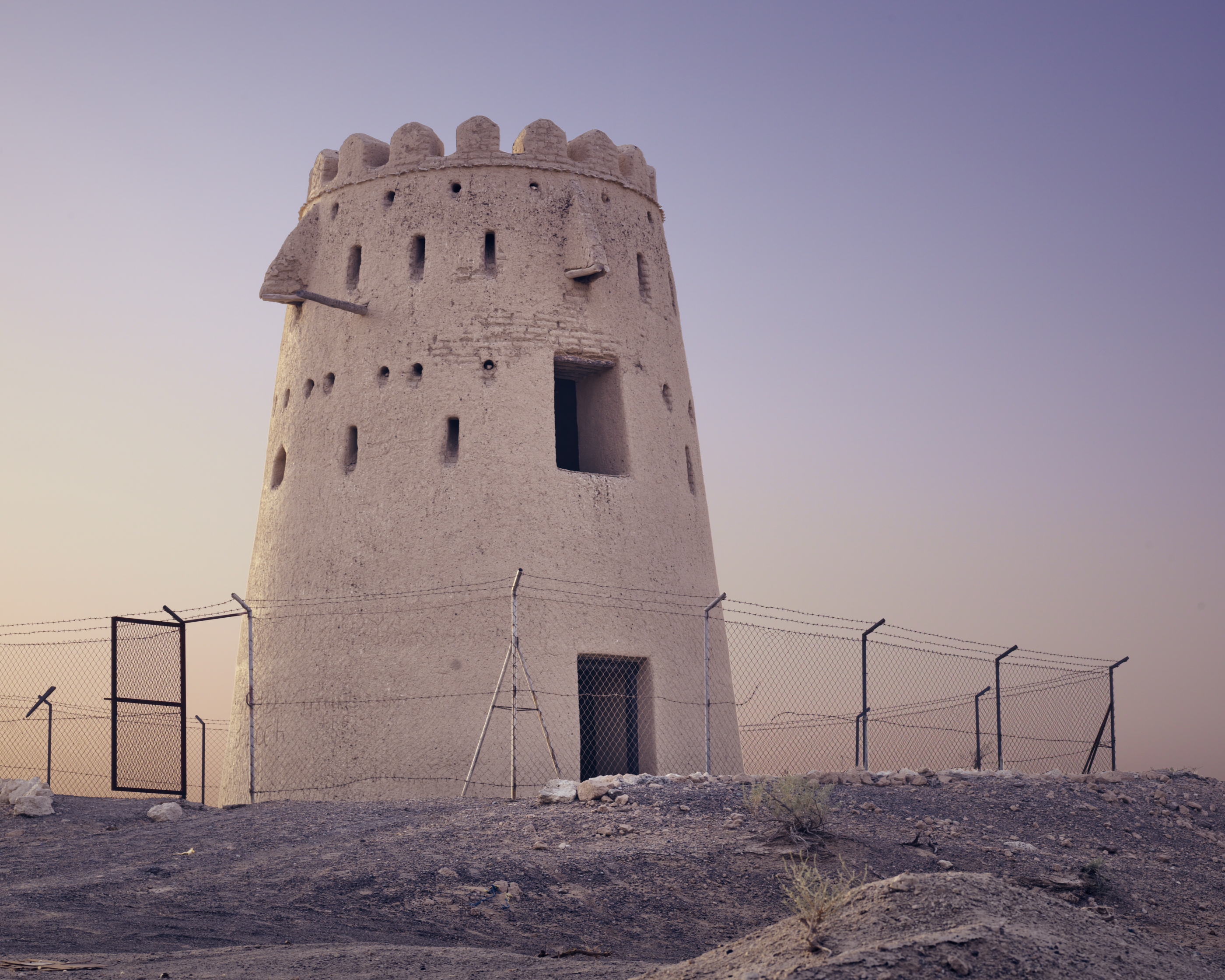
- Clockwise from top: Mangroves with the skyline in background, Falaj Al Mualla Tower, Umm Al Quwain Fort

- Flag Seal Coat of arms Wordmark

- Location of Umm Al Quwain within UAE Umm Al Quwain (Persian Gulf)
- Coordinates: 25°33′12″N 55°32′51″E
- Country: United Arab Emirates
- Emirate: Umm Al Quwain

Government
  - Type: Municipality
  - Ruler: Sheikh Saud bin Rashid Al Mualla

Population (2022)
  - City: 59,098
  - Metro: 72,000

GDP
  - Metro: US$ 0.7 billion (2023)
  - Per capita: US$ 7,700 (2023)
- Time zone: UTC+4 (UAE Standard Time)

Umm Al Quwain (UAQ; Arabic: أم القيوين, pronounced: /ʔumː alqejˈwejn/, Gulf Arabic: [ʔʊm͜ː 'æl ge̞ˈwe̞n]) is the capital and largest city of the Emirate of Umm Al Quwain in the United Arab Emirates. The city is situated on the peninsula of Khor Al Bidiyah, with its nearest major cities being Sharjah to the southwest and Ras Al Khaimah to the northeast. The city's economy is primarily based on fishing and tourism, with some industrial activities and trade.

Umm Al Quwain is connected to Ras Al Khaimah and Abu Dhabi by paved roads. Approximately 32 kilometers inland from the city is the oasis of Falaj Al Mualla, which has date palm plantations.

The ruling family of Umm Al Quwain, the Al Mualla family, descends from the Al Mualla lineage of the Al Ali tribe. The family originally lived on Siniyah Island, but moved to the mainland due to a lack of freshwater resources and established an independent Sheikhdom. The current ruler of Umm Al Quwain is Sheikh Saud bin Rashid Al Mualla, who became the ruler on 2 January 2009, and is a member of the UAE Supreme Council.

In March 2023, the Umm Al Quwain Department of Tourism and Archaeology announced the discovery of the oldest known pearling town in the Persian Gulf, located on Siniyah Island. The Sobha Siniya Island residential and resort complex is also situated on Siniyah Island.

== Etymology ==
The name Umm Al Quwain is widely believed to mean "mother of the two powers" (Arabic: ام القوتين, romanized: Umm Al Quwatain), which is derived from the Arabic phrase indicating the dual influence of land and water in the region.

== Economy ==
Umm Al Quwain's economy is driven by various sectors, including tourism, fisheries, manufacturing, and trade. The city also benefits from the Umm Al Quwain Free Zone, which supports small and medium-sized enterprises (SMEs) and encourages investment. The economy has grown in recent years, with an increase in the number of commercial establishments and factories. Development of transportation infrastructure, including highways linking the city to other parts of the UAE, has further supported economic growth.

The fishing industry, along with manufacturing and trade, continues to play an important role in the city's economy. The government has initiated several programs to attract investment, promote economic diversification, and support the local business environment.

== See also ==
- Umm Al Quwain University
