= Equestrian at the 2006 Asian Games – Team endurance =

Team endurance at the 2006 Asian Games
- Venue: Mesaieed Endurance Course
- Date: 14 December 2006
- Competitors: 31 from 8 nations

Medalists
| gold medal | United Arab Emirates; Rashid Al-Maktoum, Hamdan Al-Maktoum, Ahmed Al-Maktoum, Majid Al-Maktoum |
| silver medal | Bahrain; Ahmed Hamad Al-Rowaiei, Duaij Al-Khalifa, Khalid Al-Khalifa, Nasser Al-Khalifa |
| bronze medal | Qatar; Fahad Al-Hajri, Mohammed Al-Thani, Essa Al-Mannai, Ali Al-Malki |

Team endurance equestrian at the 2006 Asian Games was held in Mesaieed Endurance Course, Doha, Qatar on December 14, 2006.

== Schedule ==
All times are Arabia Standard Time (UTC+03:00)

| Date | Time | Event |
|---|---|---|
| Thursday, 14 December 2006 | 06:00 | Final |

== Results ==
Legend

- EL — Eliminated
- RT — Retired
- WD — Withdrawn

| Rank | Team | Riders (Time) |
|---|---|---|
| 1st place, gold medalist(s) | United Arab Emirates (UAE) | 3 (18:55:23) |
| | Rashid Al-Maktoum on Magic Glenn | 5:45:49 |
| | Hamdan Al-Maktoum on Jazyk | ~~EL~~ |
| | Ahmed Al-Maktoum on Kamel Armor | 6:34:44 |
| | Majid Al-Maktoum on Fulya | 6:34:50 |
| 2nd place, silver medalist(s) | Bahrain (BRN) | 2 (12:11:53) |
| | Ahmed Hamad Al-Rowaiei on Lormar Lorraine | ~~RT~~ |
| | Duaij Al-Khalifa on Moolmanshoek Pula | 6:23:00 |
| | Khalid Al-Khalifa on Henham Charlie Brown | ~~EL~~ |
| | Nasser Al-Khalifa on Shar Rushkin | 5:48.53 |
| 3rd place, bronze medalist(s) | Qatar (QAT) | 2 (12:49:26) |
| | Fahad Al-Hajri on Tequila | 6:04:06 |
| | Mohammed Al-Thani on Jamila du Cles | ~~EL~~ |
| | Essa Al-Mannai on Jibbah Goar | 6:45:20 |
| | Ali Al-Malki on Bashar Silver Shadow | ~~EL~~ |
| 4 | Jordan (JOR) | 2 (17:47:49) |
| | Jihad Shhaltough on Bull | ~~EL~~ |
| | Yara Asslan on Mahboub Sultan | ~~EL~~ |
| | Sayf Nowwar on Anwan | 8:53:56 |
| | Abdulhamid Al-Saleh on Qual | 8:53:53 |
| 5 | Syria (SYR) | 1 (6:14:04) |
| | Dea Toutoungi on Gada | ~~EL~~ |
| | Ahmad Hamcho on L.O. Karim | 6:14:04 |
| | Manal Jadaan on Codicia | ~~RT~~ |
| | Tarek Al-Arnaoot on Moraz | ~~EL~~ |
| 6 | Saudi Arabia (KSA) | 1 (6:48:40) |
| | Abdullah Al-Saud on Imanh | ~~RT~~ |
| | Saud Al-Saud on Sultan | ~~EL~~ |
| | Abdulaafedh Al-Turkumani on Keroch | ~~EL~~ |
| | Homoud Al-Shammari on Cherox Juana | 6:48:40 |
| — | South Korea (KOR) | 0 |
| | Park Ick-tae on Ballistic | ~~EL~~ |
| | Lee Seok on Mommesin | ~~EL~~ |
| | Ahn So-yeoun on Kreta Leus | ~~EL~~ |
| | Lee Byeong-kuk on Corkey | ~~WD~~ |
| — | Kuwait (KUW) | 0 |
| | Yaqoub Al-Naserallah on Fajr Al-Mulook | ~~EL~~ |
| | Mai Al-Hadad on Ermout de Carrer | ~~EL~~ |
| | Ali Al-Khorafi on Wady Al-Mulook | ~~EL~~ |
