= Equestrian at the 2006 Asian Games – Individual endurance =

Individual endurance at the 2006 Asian Games
- Venue: Mesaieed Endurance Course
- Date: 14 December 2006
- Competitors: 44 from 9 nations

Medalists
| gold medal | Rashid Al-Maktoum | United Arab Emirates |
| silver medal | Nasser Al-Khalifa | Bahrain |
| bronze medal | Sultan Bin Sulayem | United Arab Emirates |

Individual endurance equestrian at the 2006 Asian Games was held in Mesaieed Endurance Course, Doha, Qatar on December 14, 2006.

== Schedule ==
All times are Arabia Standard Time (UTC+03:00)

| Date | Time | Event |
|---|---|---|
| Thursday, 14 December 2006 | 06:00 | Final |

== Results ==
Legend

- EL — Eliminated
- RT — Retired
- WD — Withdrawn

| Rank | Athlete | Horse | Time |
|---|---|---|---|
| 1st place, gold medalist(s) | Rashid Al-Maktoum (UAE) | Magic Glenn | 5:45:49 |
| 2nd place, silver medalist(s) | Nasser Al-Khalifa (BRN) | Shar Rushkin | 5:48.53 |
| 3rd place, bronze medalist(s) | Sultan Bin Sulayem (UAE) | Iknour de la Bire | 5:51:39 |
| 4 | Fahad Al-Hajri (QAT) | Tequila | 6:04:06 |
| 5 | Saoud Al-Marri (QAT) | Nu Piece | 6:11:17 |
| 6 | Ahmad Hamcho (SYR) | L.O. Karim | 6:14:04 |
| 7 | Duaij Al-Khalifa (BRN) | Moolmanshoek Pula | 6:23:00 |
| 8 | Ahmed Al-Maktoum (UAE) | Kamel Armor | 6:34:44 |
| 9 | Majid Al-Maktoum (UAE) | Fulya | 6:34:50 |
| 10 | Fahad Al-Bakheet (BRN) | Castlebar Treaty | 6:34:53 |
| 11 | Nawaf Al-Otaibi (KSA) | Kool | 6:34:54 |
| 12 | Abdulla Fetais Al-Marri (QAT) | Bourhani Azeem | 6:38:33 |
| 13 | Hamad Al-Marri (QAT) | Mansour | 6:45:19 |
| 14 | Essa Al-Mannai (QAT) | Jibbah Goar | 6:45:20 |
| 15 | Homoud Al-Shammari (KSA) | Cherox Juana | 6:48:40 |
| 16 | Abdulla Al-Marri (QAT) | Bently | 7:19:32 |
| 17 | Ghanim Al-Obaidli (QAT) | Louvine | 7:20:07 |
| 18 | Abdulhamid Al-Saleh (JOR) | Qual | 8:53:53 |
| 19 | Sayf Nowwar (JOR) | Anwan | 8:53:56 |
| — | Ahmed Hamad Al-Rowaiei (BRN) | Lormar Lorraine | RT |
| — | Abdullah Al-Saud (KSA) | Imanh | RT |
| — | Manal Jadaan (SYR) | Codicia | RT |
| — | Salman Al-Khalifa (BRN) | El Devlin First Knight | EL |
| — | Khalid Al-Khalifa (BRN) | Henham Charlie Brown | EL |
| — | Yara Asslan (JOR) | Mahboub Sultan | EL |
| — | Jihad Shhaltough (JOR) | Bull | EL |
| — | Ahn So-yeoun (KOR) | Kreta Leus | EL |
| — | Park Ick-tae (KOR) | Ballistic | EL |
| — | Lee Seok (KOR) | Mommesin | EL |
| — | Abdulaafedh Al-Turkumani (KSA) | Keroch | EL |
| — | Saud Al-Saud (KSA) | Sultan | EL |
| — | Mai Al-Hadad (KUW) | Ermout de Carrer | EL |
| — | Ali Al-Khorafi (KUW) | Wady Al-Mulook | EL |
| — | Yaqoub Al-Naserallah (KUW) | Fajr Al-Mulook | EL |
| — | Rahman Azman (MAS) | Colorado | EL |
| — | Atta Mohammed (QAT) | Proavodo | EL |
| — | Mohammed Al-Thani (QAT) | Jamila du Cles | EL |
| — | Ali Al-Malki (QAT) | Bashar Silver Shadow | EL |
| — | Ahmed Al-Malki (QAT) | Luna Llena | EL |
| — | Faleh Al-Ajami (QAT) | Joab | EL |
| — | Dea Toutoungi (SYR) | Gada | EL |
| — | Tarek Al-Arnaoot (SYR) | Moraz | EL |
| — | Hamdan Al-Maktoum (UAE) | Jazyk | EL |
| — | Lee Byeong-kuk (KOR) | Corkey | WD |
