= Juma bin Maktoum bin Hasher Al Maktoum =

- Sheikh
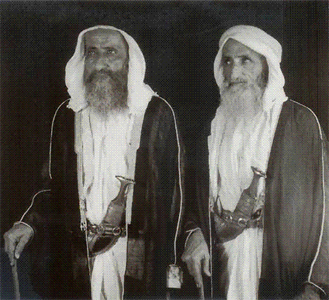
- Sheikh Juma bin Maktoum bin Hasher Al Maktoum (left) and Sheikh Saeed bin Maktoum bin Hasher Al Maktoum (right)
- Born: 1891; Dubai
- Died: after 1971
- Issue: Ubaid; Maktoum; Hamad; Thani; Ahmed; Dalmook
Names
- Sheikh Juma bin Maktoum bin Hasher bin Maktoum bin Butti bin Suhail Al Maktoum
- House: Al Maktoum
- Father: Maktoum bin Hasher Al Maktoum
- Religion: Sunni Islam

Sheikh Juma bin Maktoum bin Hasher Al Maktoum (born 1891 - died after 1971) (Arabic: جمعة بن مكتوم بن حشر آل مكتوم) was a member of the Al Maktoum royal family of Dubai. He was the brother of the ruler of Dubai from 1912 to 1948, Saeed bin Maktoum bin Hasher Al Maktoum (Saeed II of Dubai).

== Early life ==
Sheikh Juma bin Maktoum Al Maktoum was one of at least three sons of Sheikh Maktoum bin Hasher, the ruler of Dubai from 1894 to 1906. The other known sons of Maktoum bin Hasher are Saeed and Hasher. Maktoum bin Hasher was succeeded upon his death by Butti bin Suhail Al Maktoum. Juma's brother Saeed became the ruler of Dubai upon the death of Butti bin Suhail in 1912.

== Notable descendants ==
Juma's sons include Sheikh Ubaid, Sheikh Maktoum, Sheikh Hamad (Sheikh Hamad had five sons Sheikh Hasher bin Hamad bin Juma Al Maktoum, Sheikh Farid bin Hamad bin Juma Al Maktoum, Sheikh Thani bin Hamad bin Juma Al Maktoum, Sheikh Ahmed bin Hamad bin Juma Al Maktoum.), and Sheikh Dalmook. Through his son Sheikh Maktoum's marriage to a cousin (a daughter of Saeed II), Sheikh Juma is the paternal grandfather of Sheikha Hind bint Maktoum bin Juma Al Maktoum. Sheikha Hind is the senior wife of Saeed II of Dubai's grandson (through his son and successor Rashid bin Saeed Al Maktoum), ruler Mohammed bin Rashid Al Maktoum of Dubai. Sheikh Juma is therefore a great-grandfather to Hind's children, including Crown Prince Hamdan bin Mohammed Al Maktoum.

Another granddaughter of Sheikh Juma's, Sheikha Rodha, through his son Sheikh Ahmed married Mohammed bin Rashid's brother Hamdan bin Rashid Al Maktoum.
