= Maktoum bin Mohammed Al Maktoum =

Emirati politician (born 1983)

Sheikh Maktoum bin Mohammed Al Maktoum
- مكتوم بن محمد آل مكتوم
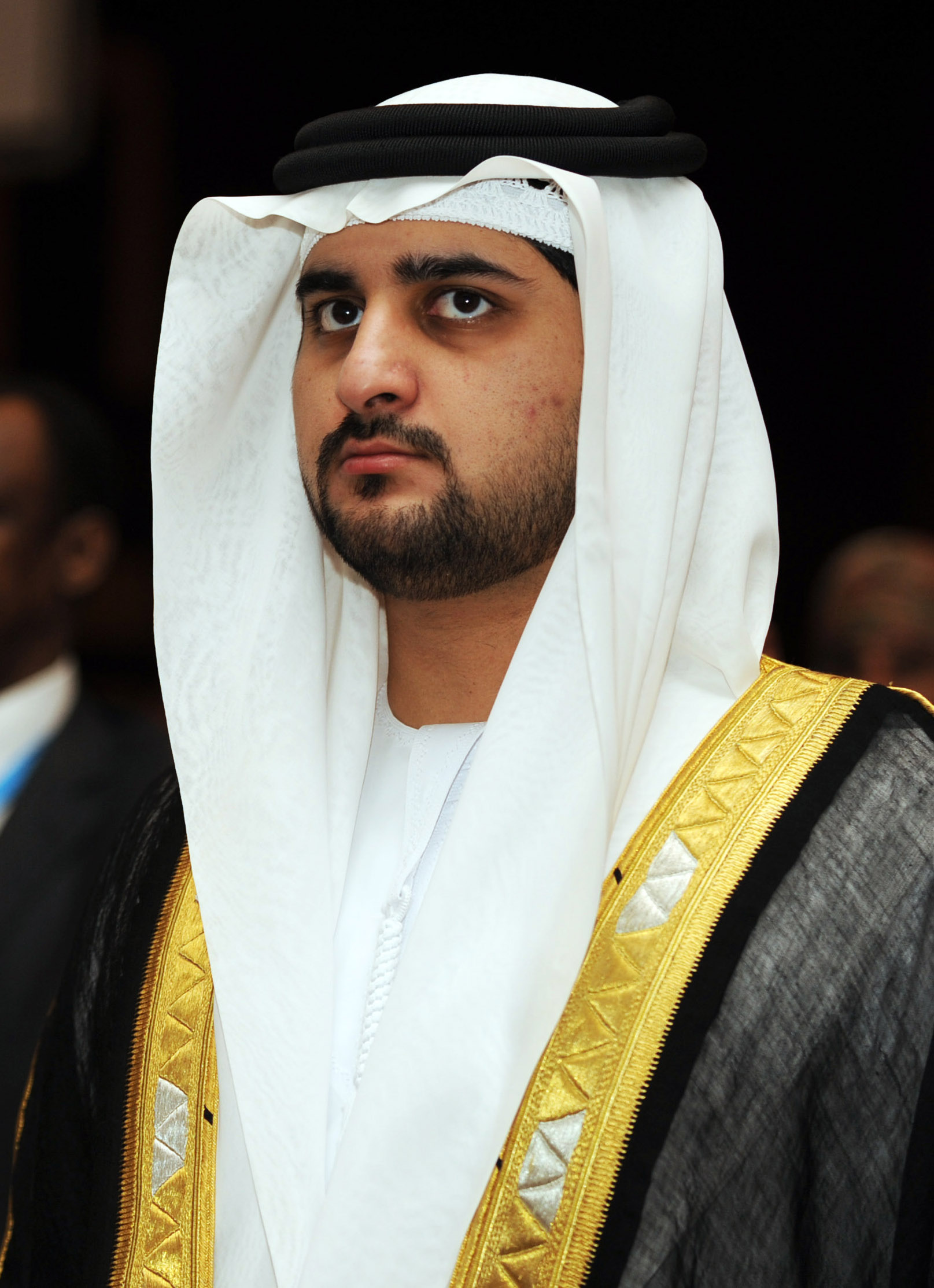
- Sheikh Maktoum in 2012

Deputy Prime Minister of the United Arab Emirates
- Incumbent
- Assumed office 25 September 2021 Serving with 4 other people
- President: Khalifa bin Zayed Al Nahyan; Mohamed bin Zayed Al Nahyan
- Prime Minister: Mohammed bin Rashid Al Maktoum
- Preceded by: Hamdan bin Zayed Al Nahyan & Sultan bin Zayed bin Sultan Al Nahyan

Minister of Finance
- Incumbent
- Assumed office 25 September 2021
- President: Khalifa bin Zayed Al Nahyan; Mohamed bin Zayed Al Nahyan
- Prime Minister: Mohammed bin Rashid Al Maktoum
- Preceded by: Hamdan bin Rashid Al Maktoum

Deputy Ruler of Dubai
- Incumbent
- Assumed office 1 February 2008 Serving with Hamdan bin Rashid Al Maktoum (2008–2021) and Ahmed bin Mohammed Al Maktoum (2023–present)
- Monarch: Mohammed bin Rashid Al Maktoum
- Preceded by: Hamdan bin Mohammed Al Maktoum

Chairman of the Court of HH Ruler of Dubai
- Incumbent
- Assumed office 15 May 2021
- Monarch: Mohammed bin Rashid Al Maktoum
- Preceded by: Office established

Personal details
- Born: Maktoum bin Mohammed bin Rashid Al Maktoum; 24 November 1983 (age 42) Dubai, United Arab Emirates
- Spouse: Maryam bint Butti bin Maktoum Al Maktoum (m. 2019)
- Issue: Hind; Latifa; Shaikha; Maryam; Futtaim
- House: Al Maktoum
- Father: Mohammed bin Rashid Al Maktoum
- Mother: Hind bint Maktoum Al Maktoum

Sheikh Maktoum bin Mohammed bin Rashid Al Maktoum (Arabic: مكتوم بن محمد بن راشد آل مكتوم; born 24 November 1983) is an Emirati royal and politician who serves as minister of finance of the United Arab Emirates, deputy ruler of Dubai and chairman of Dubai Media Incorporated. He was named as deputy ruler in February 2008 when his elder brother Hamdan was made crown prince. He served as deputy ruler alongside his uncle Sheikh Hamdan bin Rashid Al Maktoum until the latter's death in March 2021. Since then until 2023, he was the sole deputy ruler under his father Mohammed bin Rashid Al Maktoum's reign. In April 2023, his younger brother Sheikh Ahmed bin Mohammed Al Maktoum was also named deputy ruler. In September 2021, he was appointed deputy prime minister and finance minister of the UAE.

Maktoum is also the chairman of Dubai Knowledge Park, formerly known as Dubai Knowledge Village, inaugurated in 2003.

== Early life and education ==
Sheikh Maktoum bin Mohammed bin Rashid Al Maktoum was born on 24 November 1983 in Dubai. He is the third son of Dubai's ruler, Sheikh Mohammed bin Rashid Al Maktoum with his wife Sheikha Hind bint Maktoum bin Juma Al Maktoum. While he is his mother's third son, he is his father's tenth child and fourth son. He completed his high school at Rashid School for Boys, Dubai, and graduated from the American University in Dubai with a bachelor's degree in Business Administration in 2006. He attended numerous training courses in the Dubai School of Government, as well as Harvard University.

== Career ==
Sheikh Maktoum chairs the Board of Directors of Dubai Media Incorporated and serves as the Chairman of Dubai Technology and Media Free Zone Authority (TECOM Investments). Sheikh Maktoum has accompanied the late President of the United Arab Emirates, Sheikh Khalifa bin Zayed Al Nahyan, to numerous conferences, summits and official visits. He has also accompanied Sheikh Mohammed to several Gulf, Arab, and international political and economic conferences.

He is the president and chairman of the higher board of governors of the Dubai International Financial Centre.

He was named as deputy ruler in February 2008 when his elder brother Hamdan was made crown prince. He served as deputy ruler alongside his uncle Sheikh Hamdan bin Rashid Al Maktoum until the latter's death in March 2021. Since then until 2023, he was the sole deputy ruler under his father Mohammed bin Rashid Al Maktoum's reign. In April 2023, his younger brother Sheikh Ahmed bin Mohammed Al Maktoum was also named deputy ruler. In September 2021, he was appointed Deputy Prime Minister and Finance Minister of the UAE.

== Appointments ==
In 2017, he was appointed as Chairman of the Dubai Real Estate Corporation.

In May 2018, he was sworn in as President of the Financial Audit Authority (FAA).

On 15 May 2021, he was appointed as Chairman of the Ruler's Court.

In 2021, Mohammed bin Rashid Al Maktoum, the ruler of Dubai, assigned Maktoum bin Mohammed bin Rashid Al Maktoum to supervise the financial markets and stock exchanges in Dubai. In November 2021, Maktoum bin Mohammed listed Dubai's road toll system Salik on the Dubai Financial Market.

In May 2021, he was appointed as Chairman of the Court of the Ruler of Dubai.

He was appointed Chairman of the Dubai Culture and Arts Authority (DCAA) in 2015. The DCAA is also known as Dubai Culture and is tasked with managing the heritage of Dubai.

== Decisions as Minister of Finance ==
In November 2021, Maktoum formed the Dubai Markets Supervisory Committee, which he chairs, to develop strategy and policy for the Dubai Financial Market.

Also in November 2021, he launched the Future District Fund, worth AED 1 billion, to invest in technology start-ups and incentivizing technology companies to list in the Dubai Financial Market. The Fund's set target was to establish 1,000 companies within five years of its setup. Maktoum appointed Sharif El-Badawi as CEO of the Future District Fund.

In October 2021, Maktoum bin Mohammed bin Rashid Al Maktoum, along with his father and three brothers, launched the Hatta Master Development Plan to develop the Hatta region as a business and tourism hub.

== Personal life ==
On 15 May 2019, he married Maryam bint Butti bin Maktoum Al Maktoum, on the same day that his brothers Hamdan and Ahmed also married. On 6 June 2019, he and his brothers celebrated the royal wedding together at the Dubai World Trade Center. Together with his wife, he has five daughters:

- Hind bint Maktoum Al Maktoum (born 24 November 2020).
- Latifa bint Maktoum Al Maktoum (born 11 January 2022).
- Shaikha bint Maktoum Al Maktoum (born 25 January 2023).
- Maryam bint Maktoum Al Maktoum (born 7 July 2025)
- Futtaim bint Maktoum Al Maktoum (born 18 June 2026)

In April 2026, he bought a townhouse in London’s Belgravia neighborhood for £35.5 million ($47 million). The house was built 1810, and is six stories tall and has a swimming pool in the basement.

== Award ==
The Sheikh Maktoum bin Mohammed bin Rashid Al Maktoum Cambridge ICT Awards recognize outstanding academic achievements among students in the UAE based on Cambridge IGCSE, AS Level and A Level examinations. The awards also honor inspirational teachers.
