= Hind bint Maktoum Al Maktoum =

Consort of the Ruler of Dubai

- Sheikha
- Born: 12 February 1962 (age 64)
- Spouse: Mohammed bin Rashid Al Maktoum (m. 1979)
- Issue: See list
Names
- Sheikha Hind bint Maktoum bin Juma bin Maktoum bin Hasher bin Maktoum bin Butti bin Suhail Al Maktoum
- House: Al Maktoum
- Father: Maktoum bin Juma Al Maktoum
- Mother: Shaikha bint Saeed bin Maktoum Al Maktoum

Sheikha Hind bint Maktoum bin Juma Al Maktoum (Arabic: الشيخة هند بنت مكتوم بن جمعة آل مكتوم; born 12 February 1962) is an Emirati royal who is the senior wife and consort of Sheikh Mohammed bin Rashid Al Maktoum, the ruler of Dubai. They were married on 26 April 1979. She is the mother of 12 of her husband's twenty-six children, including his heir apparent, Hamdan bin Mohammed Al Maktoum, the Crown Prince of Dubai.

== Family ==
Sheikha Hind's paternal grandfather was Sheikh Juma bin Maktoum Al Maktoum, brother of Emir Saeed II of Dubai, paternal grandfather of the current Sheikh. She is also the niece of Sheikh Ahmad Bin Juma Al Maktoum, who died in 2009.

Her mother, Sheikha Shaikha bint Saeed bin Maktoum Al Maktoum (who died on 28 January 2017), was the daughter of Emir Saeed II of Dubai, making Sheikha Hind a first cousin of her husband through her mother as well as second cousin of her husband through her father.

== Marriage ==
In 1979, Hind bint Maktoum married her cousin, Mohammed bin Rashid. Their wedding was Dubai's first major public event. Elaborate arrangements were made to celebrate the event. A 20,000 seat stadium was built to host the wedding, which featured displays of horse and camel riding, and an aerobatics display by the Dubai Air Force. The total cost of the wedding celebrations was estimated to be around $100 million. Her photograph has never been shown publicly.

Being the Sheikh's senior wife and consort, Sheikha Hind is the ruling family's chief matriarch and resides with her family in the Zabeel Palace (Ruler's Palace) in Dubai. He is divorced from the rest of the wives. Sheikha Hind oversees the upbringing of her children and the orphans she has adopted.

=== Children ===
Sheikha Hind has 12 children:

Name	Lifespan	Notes
Hessa bint Mohammed Al Maktoum	6 November 1980 (age 46)	Married Saeed bin Dalmook bin Juma Al Maktoum in 2008
Rashid bin Mohammed Al Maktoum	12 November 1981 – 19 September 2015 (aged 33)	Died of a cardiac arrest
Hamdan bin Mohammed Al Maktoum	14 November 1982 (age 44)	Crown Prince of Dubai, Deputy Prime Minister of the UAE, and Defense Minister of the UAE; married Shaikha bint Saeed bin Thani bin Juma Al Maktoum in 2019
Maktoum bin Mohammed Al Maktoum	24 November 1983 (age 42)	Deputy Ruler of Dubai, Deputy Prime Minister of the UAE, and Finance Minister of the UAE; married Maryam bint Butti bin Maktoum bin Juma Al Maktoum in 2019
Ahmed bin Mohammed Al Maktoum	7 February 1987 (age 39)	Deputy Ruler of Dubai and Head of the UAE Olympic Committee; married Madiyah bint Dalmook bin Juma Al Maktoum in 2019
Saeed bin Mohammed Al Maktoum	20 March 1988 (age 38)	
Latifa bint Mohammed Al Maktoum	30 March 1989 (age 37)	Married Mohammed bin Hamad bin Mohammed Al Sharqi, the Crown Prince of Fujairah, in 2009
Maryam bint Mohammed Al Maktoum	11 January 1992 (age 34)	Married Khaled bin Mohammed bin Hamdan Al Nahyan in 2019
Shaikha bint Mohammed Al Maktoum	20 December 1992 (age 33)	Married Nasser bin Hamad Al Khalifa in 2009
Futaim bint Mohammed Al Maktoum	22 July 1994 (age 32)	
Salamah bint Mohammed Al Maktoum	8 August 1999 (age 27)	
Shamma bint Mohammed Al Maktoum	13 November 2000 (age 26)	

== Sheikha Hind Women's Sport Tournament ==
The tournament was launched on 17 December 2012, at the Dubai World Trade Centre, and was organized by the Women's Sport Committee of the Dubai Sports Council, under the patronage of Sheikha Hind, and the guidance of her son, Sheikh Hamdan, the Crown Prince of Dubai and Chairman of Dubai Sports Council (DSC). The sports tournament is meant to encourage women to come out and actively participate in fitness and sports activities.

== Charity work and donations ==
In January 2013, Sheikha Hind donated three planes to airlift the United Arab Emirates national football team’s fans from Manama in Bahrain to Dubai following UAE's 1-0 victory over Kuwait in the semi-final of the 21st Arabian Gulf Cup.

In June 2013, The Mohammed bin Rashid Charity and Humanitarian Establishment distributed 4100 smart cards of Ramadan Ration by donation of Sheikha Hind bint Maktoum in its charitable programmes for the Holy Month of Ramadan, aiming at distributing basic foodstuff to the needy and poor families in the emirate of Dubai and northern areas. Ibrahim Boumelha, Vice Chairman of the Board of Trustees of the Foundation, expressed his gratitude and thanks to Sheikha Hind for her moral and material support for various charitable projects, undertaken by the Foundation for the benefit of the citizens and residents expatriates, particularly during Ramadan.
