= Dubai it =

Public initiative and annual awards program

Dubai-it Award
- Description: Completed projects and measurable achievements in the public and private sectors
- Location: Dubai
- Country: United Arab Emirates
- Presented by: Hamdan bin Mohammed Al Maktoum
- Website: dubai-it.ae

Dubai-it (Arabic: دبي الأفعال, literally "Dubai of Actions") is a public initiative and awards program in Dubai, United Arab Emirates, launched on 17 June 2026. It focuses on project execution, institutional development, and measurable outcomes across public and private sectors in the emirate.

== Background ==
According to its organizers, the English title Dubai-it turns the city name into a verb to signify turning ideas into reality. The campaign was promoted in Dubai through outdoor advertising and in the media. It encouraged participants to present before-and-after examples of completed work in sectors such as public services, commerce, technology, and entrepreneurship.

== Dubai-it Award ==
Launched alongside the initiative, the Dubai-it Award recognizes individuals and institutions for completed projects and measurable achievements.

The award covers 13 participant categories across 10 sectors: government, real estate, economy, commerce, technology, sports, society, education, services, and health. Nominations for the first edition were submitted until September 2026.

The inaugural edition concluded on 11 November 2026, when Hamdan bin Mohammed Al Maktoum, the Crown Prince of Dubai, honoured 13 winners across government and private sectors.
