= Rashid School For Boys =

Coordinates: 25°8′56″N 55°18′46″E

- مدرسة راشد للبنين
- Dubai; United Arab Emirates

Information
- Type: Private
- Motto: Leadership, Learning and Respect
- Established: 1986
- Enrollment: 790
- Colors: Red, White, Black, Green
- Athletics: Volleyball, Basketball, Football, Badminton, Track and Field, Cross Country, Swimming, Softball, Baseball, Rugby and Squash
- Website: www.rsbdubai.sch.ae

Rashid School For Boys (RSB) is located in the Nad Al Sheba community of Dubai, United Arab Emirates.

== History ==
Rashid School for Boys opened in 1986 under the guidance of Sheikh Maktoum bin Rashid Al Maktoum, previously the Vice President and Prime Minister of the United Arab Emirates and Ruler of Dubai.

In 1987 Dubai Educational Establishment was established independently under the jurisdiction of the Ruler's Court as a solely responsible for all matters pertaining to Rashid and Latifa Schools. Both schools had a private society, managed and financed by their owner Sheikh Maktoum bin Rashid Al Maktoum. Both were non-profit schools. Expatriate student admitted at that time were not more than 33% of students.

The Executive Director Abdulsalam Mohammed Khalifa Almarri was appointed as the Director of the Administrations & Financial matters at the Dubai Educational Establishment on 9 January 1997 by the Ruler's Court, (Diwan/36/97/Dubai Educational Establishment/ KF1/ra).

In 2006 Sheikh Mohamed Bin Rashid Al Maktoum, Ruler of Dubai announced the cancellation of Dubai Educational Establishment (decree 39 Year 2006). and Rashid and Latifa Schools fell under the jurisdiction of The Executive Council of Government of Dubai.

Only UAE Nationals are admitted as students, with an admission policy and a recommendation from the Ruler of Dubai, the Crown Prince of Dubai, or other members of the Ruling Family.

== Curriculum ==
Most lessons are taught in English (UK National Curriculum). The school teaching of Arabic language and Islamic Studies is included. Arab history and culture are incorporated into the social studies courses. Grades 10 and 11 lead to UK General Certificate of Secondary Education examinations (GCSE). In Grades 12 and 13, all students either take UK Advanced Level examinations or the High School Diploma course.

Rashid School for Boys is accredited by British Schools Overseas (BSO) and British Schools in the Middle East (BSME).

== Students ==
RSB is an academically inclusive school and accommodates a large number of students with a range of special educational needs and disabilities.

== Events ==
The school has a National Day Family Carnival to support local charities. Rashid School hosts the Emirates Environmental Group (EEG) every year, where a lot of schools from the whole UAE meet and discuss issues about the environment.

== Notable alumni ==
The school was established to provide an education for members of the Dubai ruling family and for their close associates. Many students from RSB have gone on to take on significant roles within Dubai and internationally. These include the current Crown Prince of Dubai, the Deputy Ruler of Dubai and four ministers in the current UAE Cabinet. Many other alumni have leading roles in government and businesses in Dubai and internationally.

- Rashid bin Mohammed Al Maktoum
- Hamdan bin Mohammed Al Maktoum
- Maktoum bin Mohammed Al Maktoum
- Omar Al Olama
- Bilawal Bhutto
