= Nasser bin Hamad Al Khalifa =

Bahraini royalty and government official

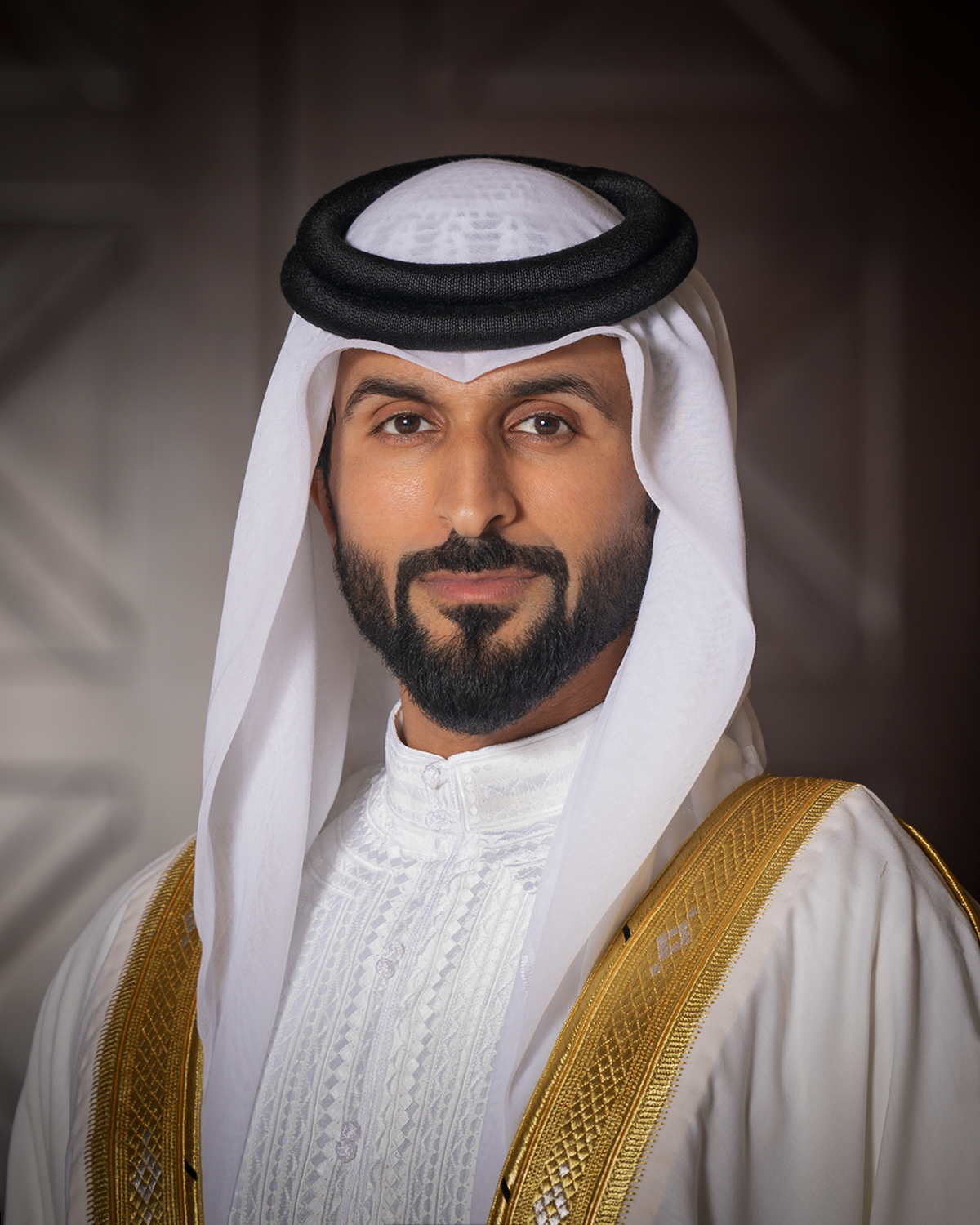
- Nasser in 2023
- Born: 8 May 1987 (age 39); Riffa, Bahrain
- Spouse: Shaikha bint Mohammed bin Rashid Al Maktoum (m. 2009)
- Issue: Sheema; Hamad; Mohammad; Hamdan; Khalid
- House: Khalifa
- Father: Hamad bin Isa Al Khalifa
- Mother: Sheia bint Hassan Al Khrayyesh Al Ajmi
- Military career
- Branch: Royal Guard
- Service years: 2006–present
- Rank: Lieutenant General
- Unit: Bahrain Royal Guards
- Commands: Commander of the Royal Guard
- Conflicts: Yemeni Civil War: Saudi Arabian-led intervention in Yemen

Styles of Sheikh Nasser bin Hamad Al Khalifa
- Reference style: His Highness
- Spoken style: Your Highness
- Alternative style: Sheikh

Sheikh Nasser bin Hamad Al Khalifa (Arabic: ناصر بن حمد آل خليفة; born 8 May 1987), also known as Prince Nasser, is a member of the Bahraini royal family. Al Khalifa is serving as Commander of Bahrain's Royal Guard, deputy chairman of the Higher Committee for Energy and Natural Resources, His Majesty's Representative for Humanitarian Works and Youth Affairs, and the head of the government's Supreme Council for Youth and Sports. He is the third in line of the heir apparent of the Kingdom of Bahrain. In April 2021, he was appointed as chairman of Bapco Energies. During the Arab Spring protests in Bahrain, Al Khalifa was accused of abusing the human rights of pro-democracy activists in the country.

== Early life and education ==
Al Khalifa is the fourth-born son of the King of Bahrain, Hamad bin Isa Al Khalifa with Sheia bint Hassan Al Khrayyesh Al Ajmi, his second wife. He was educated in Bahrain at Ibn Khuldoon National School. He attended Royal Military Academy Sandhurst in the United Kingdom (2005-2006), and achieved Second Lieutenants Rank. He also attended the U.S Marine Corps Command and Staff College; Quantico VA, USA (2010-2011). He is currently serving in the Bahrain Defence Force and leads the Bahrain National Endurance Team. He also holds the World Endurance Championship title.

== Military service ==
Al Khalifa started his career as a platoon commander in the Motorized Infantry Company of the Royal Guard Battalion. After that he went on to become the Rapid reaction force commander in the Royal Guard, where he served from 2008 to 2011, and is currently the commander of the Bahrain Defence Force Royal Guard since he was appointed in 2011. As part of these development initiatives, he established an elite contingent, the Special Quick Reaction Force, within the Royal Guard. He participated in the Saudi-led Operations Decisive Storm and Restoring Hope by commanding the first Royal Guard Task Force in 2015 which conducted operations in both Ma’rib and Aden.

In July 2020, his father King Hamad bin Isa Al Khalifa appointed him as Secretary General of the Supreme Defence Council. As the National Security Advisor and General Secretary of the Supreme Council for Defence, he manages royal directives, charged by the king, Hamad bin Isa Al Khalifa.

== Endurance racing and athletics ==
In December 2006, Al Khalifa led the Bahrain National Endurance team in the Doha Asian Games. He won a silver medal in the individual race and the six-member Bahraini squad came second in the overall team event. In September 2007, Al Khalifa led the Bahrain National Endurance team in the European Open held at Portugal. He came in 8th place in the individual race and the Bahrain team came in second place and won a silver medal. In October 2018, Al Khalifa won the 2018 Ironman World Championship title in his category. In July 2022, Al Khalifa, riding his horse Lola de Jalima, captained the Royal Endurance Team that won the 120-kilometre race and the 160-kilometre race, clocking 5 hours, 48 minutes and 59 seconds in Slovakia. In October 2022, Al Khalifa won gold at the FEI Endurance World Championship for Young Horses riding the mare Lola de Jalima in Vic, Spain. Earlier in June 2024, he and the Royal Endurance Team won in the 120-kilometer race at the Šamorín Championship in Slovakia. In September 2024, Al Khalifa achieved won the 160-kilometer FEI World Endurance Championship held in Monpazier, France. In December 2025, he won the Mohammed bin Rashid Al Maktoum Global Sports Award in the Arab Sports Personality category.

== Energy and natural resources ==
Al Khalifa was appointed in 2021 as the deputy chairman of the higher committee for energy and natural resources. The Supreme Committee for Energy and Natural Resource's responsibility is to review the national energy strategy of the Kingdom of Bahrain. The committee is also responsible for setting the strategy of the current oil expansion project in Bahrain including the Bapco Modernization Programme (BMP). He became the chairman of (Nogaholding) where the countries energy industry is transitioning towards sustainable energy production.

In March 2024, Al Khalifa, as Chairman of Bapco Energies, spearheaded a strategic partnership with TotalEnergies to optimize the operations of Bahrain's Sitra refinery and enhance petroleum product trading. This collaboration aligns with Bahrain's National Energy Strategy, emphasizing the diversification of energy resources and the promotion of sustainability.

== Humanitarian work ==
Al Khalifa is His Majesty's Representative for Humanitarian Works and Youth Affairs and chairs the Board of Trustees of the Royal Humanitarian Foundation (formerly the Royal Charity Organization).His Majesty's Representative for Humanitarian Works and Youth Affairs" Al Khalifa oversaw the opening of the Bahrain School for Syrian refugees at the Al Zatari Refugee Camp in Jordan on November 25, 2012. In February 2014, he signed an agreement with the Philippines following Typhoon Lingling to build two vocational training centers and a 500-home residential complex.

== Arab Spring ==
Al Khalifa became the subject of allegations of torture after anti-government protests in 2011, during the Arab Spring in Bahrain. At the time, he issued a royal decree permitting the army to establish military courts to deal with democracy protesters, including a committee set up to investigate "breaches by individuals associated with the sports movement during the recent unfortunate events in the Kingdom of Bahrain". In 2014, a Bahraini citizen sought the arrest of Al Khalifa in the United Kingdom following allegations that he was directly involved in the torture of three prisoners in Bahrain during a pro-democracy uprising there in 2011.

Several NGOs criticized Al Khalifa's participation at the 2014 FEI World Equestrian Games in Normandy, France. The high court in London ruled that Al Khalifa is not immune from torture claims. In 2017, activists asked the United States to suspend a diplomatic visa for Al Khalifa over the allegations. In response to these concerns, the U.S. State Department reaffirmed Bahrain's status as "an important U.S. partner," emphasizing the bilateral relationship's foundation on shared interests, including counterterrorism, regional security, and countering Iran's influence in the Middle East. The State Department did not address the specific allegations against Shaikh Nasser but highlighted Bahrain's strategic importance in U.S. foreign policy. The Bahraini government has consistently denied the allegations, describing them as politically motivated.

== Personal life ==
Al Khalifa married in Dubai on 28 September 2009 (nikah ceremony) and 2 October 2009 (milcha reception) to Shaikha bint Mohammed bin Rashid Al Maktoum, a daughter of the Ruler of Dubai, Mohammed bin Rashid Al Maktoum. They have one daughter and four sons.

== In popular culture ==
In May 2025, Al Khalifa was featured with Bear Grylls in a documentary on Amazon Prime. Later that year, in November, he was a keynote speaker at the first TEDx event in Bahrain.
