= Mohammed bin Rashid Al Maktoum =

Prime Minister of the United Arab Emirates since 2006

Mohammed bin Rashid Al Maktoum; محمد بن راشد آل مكتوم
- His Highness Sheikh
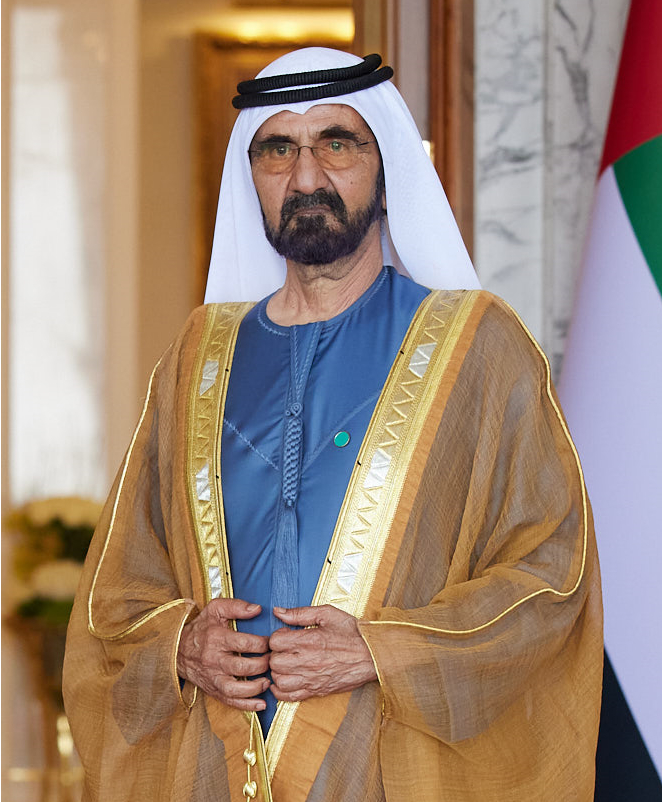
- Mohammed in 2021

Vice President of the United Arab Emirates
- Incumbent
- Assumed office 5 January 2006 Serving with Mansour bin Zayed Al Nahyan (2023–present)
- President: Khalifa bin Zayed Al Nahyan; Mohamed bin Zayed Al Nahyan
- Preceded by: Maktoum bin Rashid Al Maktoum

4th Prime Minister of the United Arab Emirates
- Incumbent
- Assumed office 11 February 2006
- President: Khalifa bin Zayed Al Nahyan; Mohamed bin Zayed Al Nahyan
- Deputies: Hamdan bin Zayed bin Sultan Al Nahyan (2006–2009); Sultan bin Zayed bin Sultan Al Nahyan (2006–2009); Mansour bin Zayed Al Nahyan (2009–present); Saif bin Zayed Al Nahyan (2009–present); Maktoum bin Mohammed Al Maktoum (2021–present); Hamdan bin Mohammed Al Maktoum (2024–present); Abdullah bin Zayed Al Nahyan (2024–present)
- Preceded by: Maktoum bin Rashid Al Maktoum

Minister of Defence
- In office 9 December 1971 – 2020
- President: Zayed bin Sultan Al Nahyan; Khalifa bin Zayed Al Nahyan; Mohamed bin Zayed Al Nahyan
- Preceded by: Post established
- Succeeded by: Vacant; Hamdan bin Mohammed Al Maktoum (in 2024)

Acting President of the United Arab Emirates
- In office 13 May 2022 – 14 May 2022
- Preceded by: Khalifa bin Zayed Al Nahyan
- Succeeded by: Mohamed bin Zayed Al Nahyan

Ruler of Dubai
- Reign: 4 January 2006 – present
- Predecessor: Maktoum bin Rashid Al Maktoum
- Heir apparent: Hamdan bin Mohammed Al Maktoum
- Born: 15 July 1949 (age 77); Dubai, Trucial States
- Spouse: See list
- Issue: See list
Names
- His Highness Sheikh Mohammed bin Rashid bin Saeed bin Maktoum bin Hasher bin Maktoum bin Butti bin Suhail Al Maktoum
- House: Al Maktoum
- Father: Rashid bin Saeed Al Maktoum
- Mother: Latifa bint Hamdan Al Nahyan
- Religion: Islam
- Police career
- Department: Dubai Police Force
- Service years: 1968–1970
- Rank: Head of Dubai Police and Public Security
- Website: Official website

Sheikh Mohammed bin Rashid Al Maktoum (Arabic: محمد بن راشد آل مكتوم, romanized: Muḥammad bin Rāšid Āl Maktūm; born 15 July 1949) is an Emirati politician and royal. He is the current ruler of Dubai and serves as the vice president and prime minister of the UAE. Mohammed succeeded his brother Maktoum bin Rashid Al Maktoum as UAE vice president, UAE prime minister and ruler of Dubai following the latter's death in 2006.

Under his leadership, Dubai became a global city. A number of government-owned enterprises have been launched, including the Emirates airline, DP World and the Jumeirah Group.

Mohammed oversaw the development of Palm Islands, the establishment of Burj Al Arab hotel and the Burj Khalifa, the tallest building in the world since 2010.

Mohammed is the absolute ruler of Dubai and the prime minister of the UAE, a position appointed by the president.

Mohammed is an accomplished equestrian and the founder of both the Godolphin stable and Darley Racing, a thoroughbred breeding operation in six countries. In 2012, he rode the horse Madji Du Pont 160 km to take the FEI World Endurance Championship.

== Early life ==
Sheikh Mohammed is the third of four sons of Sheikh Rashid bin Saeed Al Maktoum, ruler of Dubai. The Al Maktoum family is Dubai's ruling family and descendants of the House of Al-Falasi, of which Mohammed is the tribal leader. His mother was Sheikha Latifa bint Hamdan Al Nahyan, daughter of former ruler of Abu Dhabi Sheikh Hamdan bin Zayed bin Khalifa Al Nahyan. He grew up in a house without electricity. A hundred people or more lived there, including guards and maids.

=== Education ===
From the age of four, Mohammed was privately tutored in Arabic and Islamic Studies. In 1955, he began formal education at Al Ahmedia School. At the age of 10, he moved to Al Shaab School, and two years later, attended Dubai Secondary School. In 1966, with his cousin Mohammed bin Khalifa Al Maktoum, he attended the Bell Educational Trust's English Language School in the United Kingdom. He subsequently studied at the Mons Officer Cadet School in Aldershot, passing out with the sword of honour as the top Commonwealth student. He also travelled to Italy to train as a pilot.

== Political career ==
=== Dubai Police ===
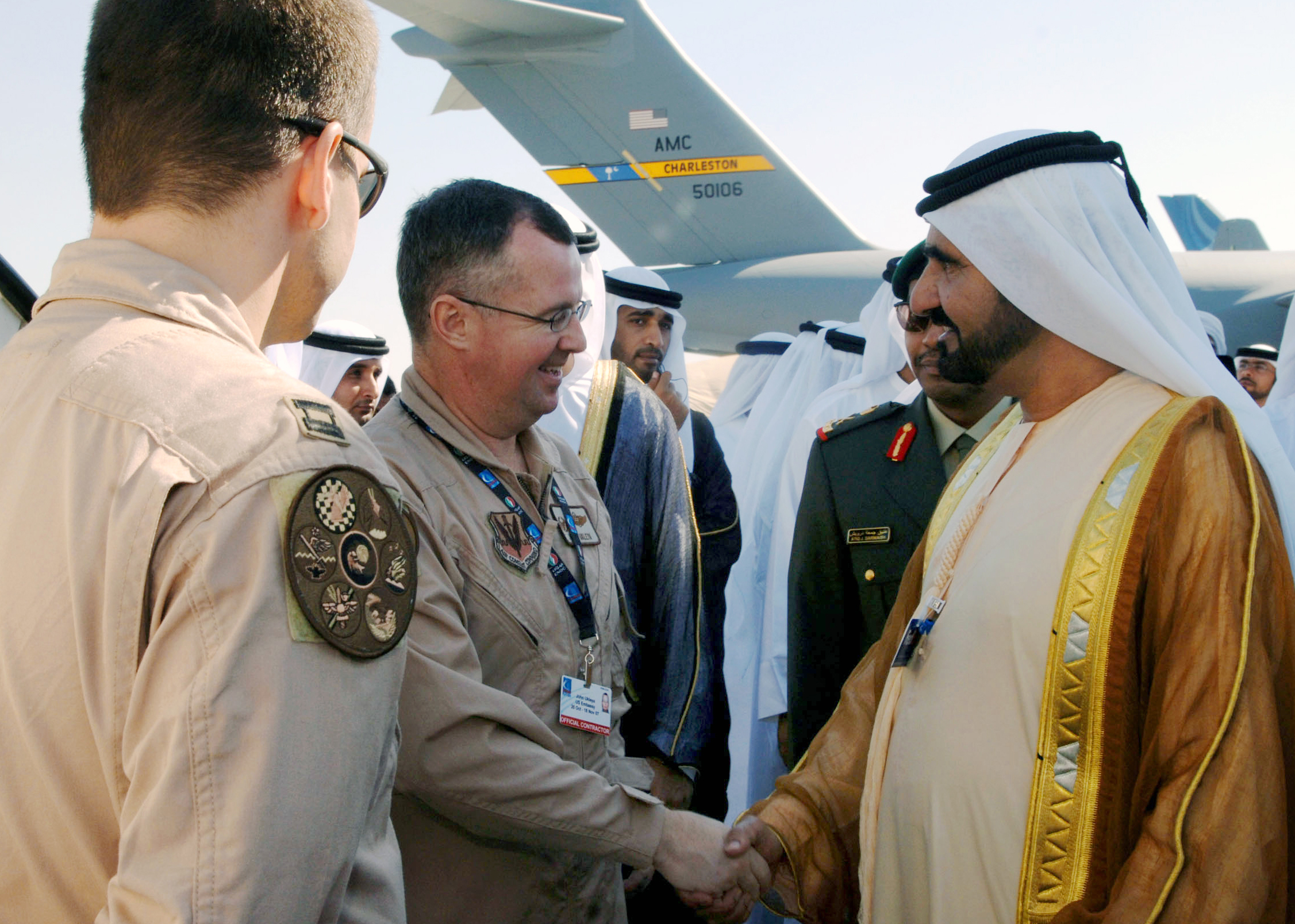
Mohammed at the Dubai Air Show, 2007

Upon Mohammed's return to Dubai from military training at age 20, his father, Rashid bin Saeed Al Maktoum, appointed him as the head of the Dubai Police Force and the Dubai Defence Force (which later became a part of the Union Defence Force).

=== Minister of Defence ===
In January 1968, Mohammed was present when his father and Sheikh Zayed bin Sultan Al Nahyan first met in the desert between Dubai and Abu Dhabi at Argoub El Sedira to agree to the formation of a union of emirates following British notification of intent to withdraw from the Trucial States. When the new country of the United Arab Emirates was founded on 2 December 1971, Mohammed became its first minister of defence at the age of 22.

A period of uncertainty and instability followed the Union of the United Arab Emirates, including skirmishes between tribes over property, straddling new borders. On 24 January 1972, the exiled former ruler of the Emirate of Sharjah, Sheikh Saqr bin Sultan Al Qasimi, led an insurrectionist coup against his successor, Khalid bin Mohammed Al Qasimi. Following a spirited firefight between the Union Defence Force and Sheikh Saqr's forces – mostly Egyptian mercenaries who had entered the UAE through Ras Al Khaimah – Mohammed accepted Saqr's surrender. Sheikh Khalid had been killed in the action, leading to the accession of his brother Sultan as ruler of Sharjah. Mohammed delivered Saqr to UAE president Zayed bin Sultan Al Nahyan, who put Saqr under house arrest in Al Ain.

In 1973, Mohammed was involved in protracted negotiations with the hijackers of JAL 404, led by Japanese Red Army member Osamu Maruouka, which landed in Dubai after being hijacked as it departed Schiphol Airport. Although unsuccessful in obtaining the release of the hostages (they were finally freed, and the 747 blown up, in Libya), he was more successful in a later negotiation with the three hijackers of KLM 861, who released the balance of their hostages and handed over the plane in return for safe passage. In 1977, Mohammed oversaw the integration of Dubai's military forces with those of the other emirates.

=== Crown Prince of Dubai ===
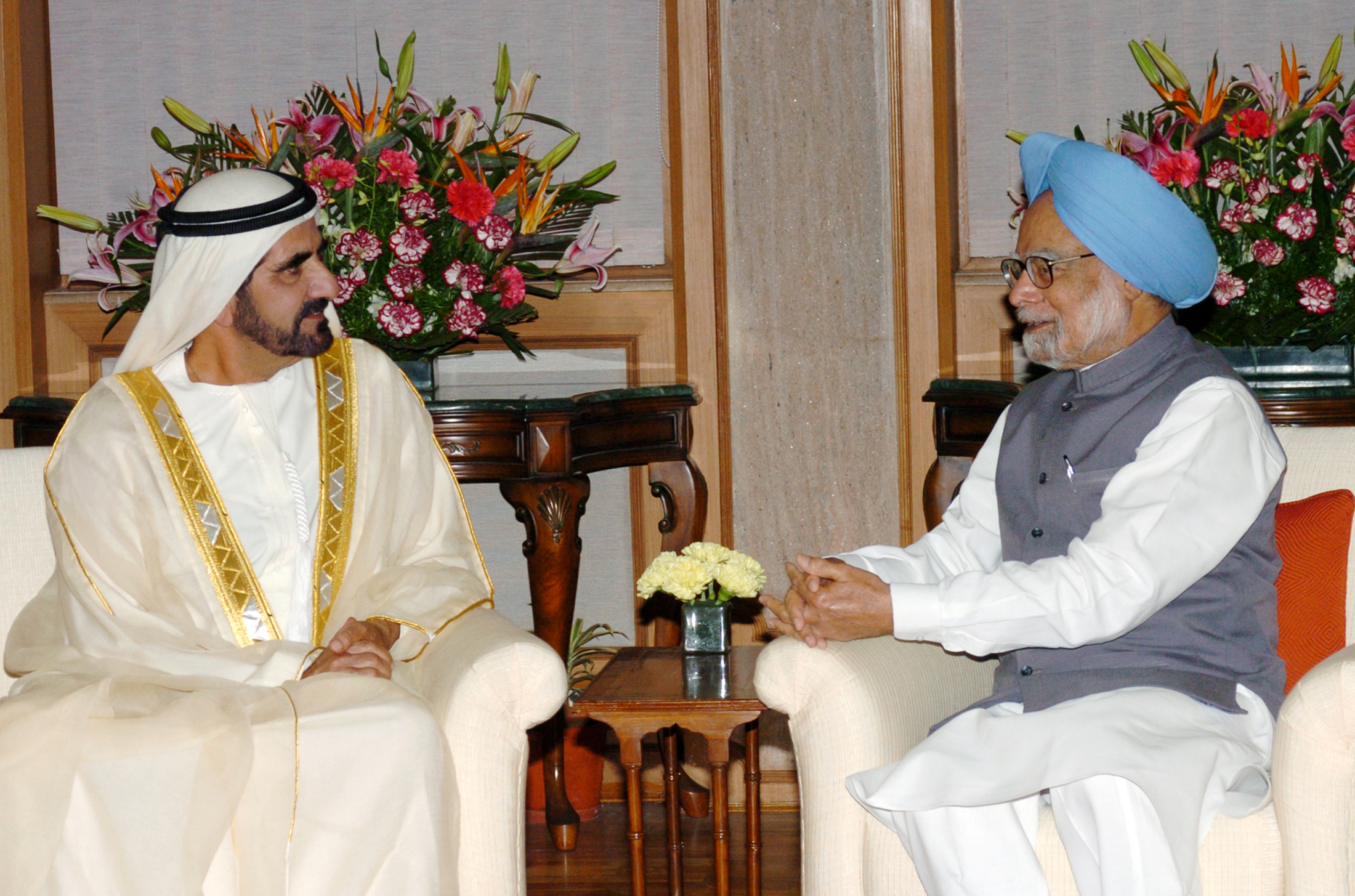
With Indian prime minister Manmohan Singh (right), March 2010

On 3 January 1995, Mohammed's brother Sheikh Maktoum bin Rashid Al Maktoum, ruler of Dubai, signed two decrees. One decree appointed Mohammed as crown prince and the other appointed their brother Hamdan as the deputy ruler of Dubai.

Mohammed created the Dubai Shopping Festival in late 1995, an annual event that has become a significant contributor to the economy of the UAE.

In 2001, Mohammed ordered the arrest of Obaid Saqr bin-Busit, the head of Dubai Customs and the chairman of the World Customs Association.

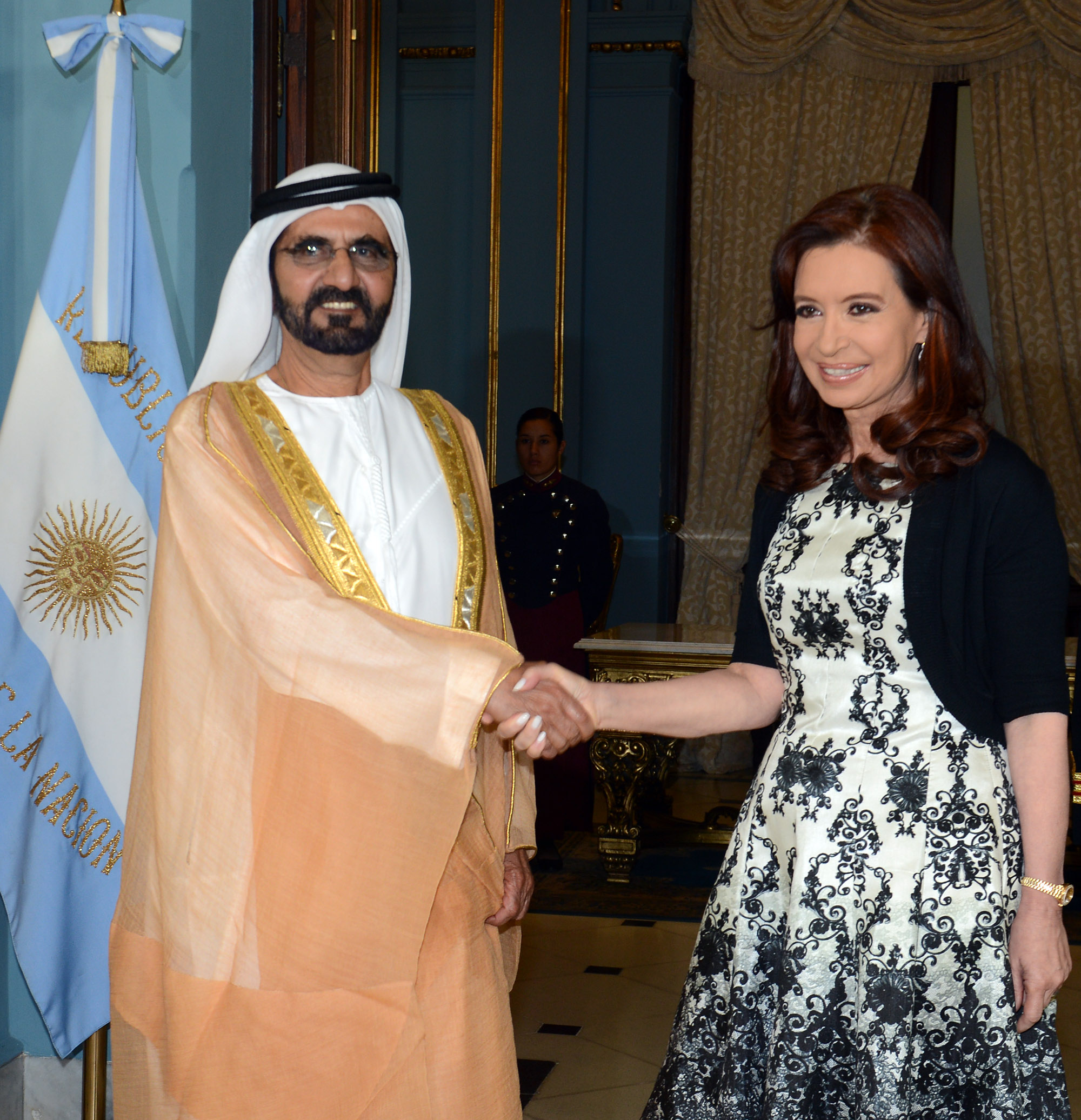
With Argentinian president Cristina Fernández de Kirchner, April 2014

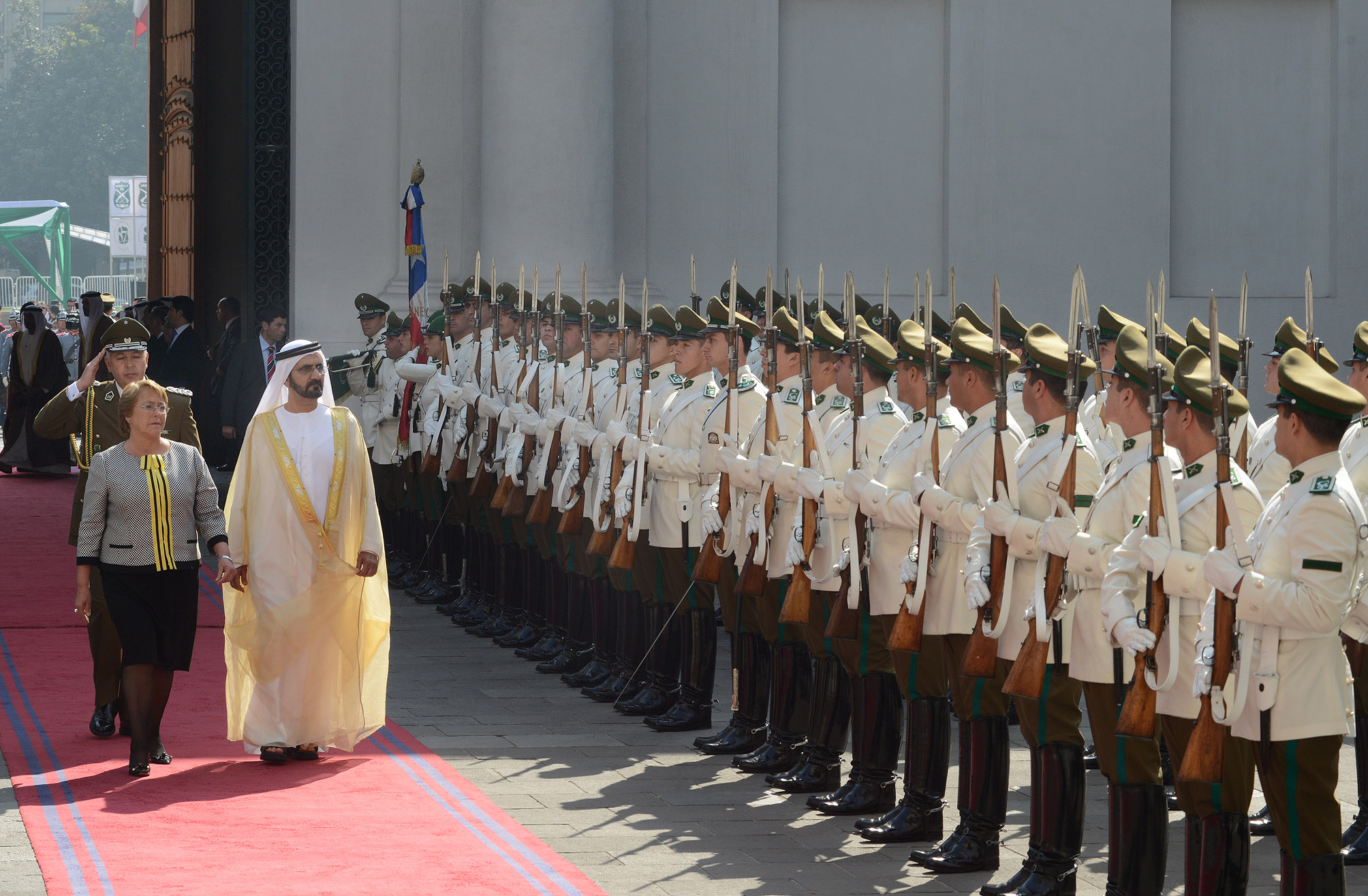
With Chilean president Michelle Bachelet, April 2014

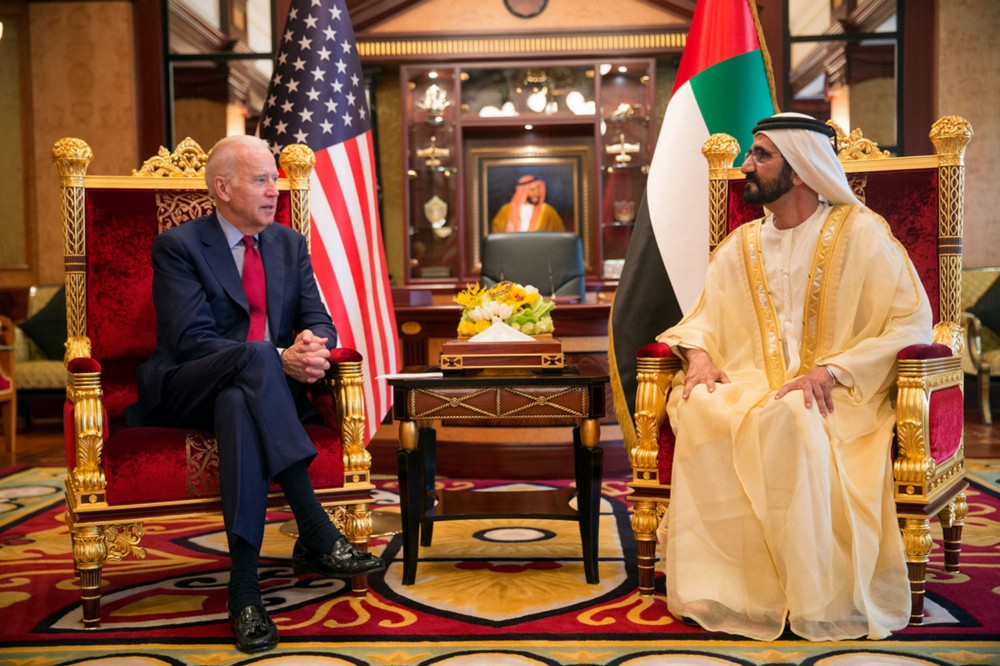
With US vice president Joe Biden, March 2016

=== Ruler of Dubai, Vice President and Prime Minister ===
After roughly a decade of de facto rule, Mohammed became the ruler of Dubai on 4 January 2006, upon the death of his brother Maktoum. The following day, the Federal National Council selected him as the new vice president of the UAE. On 11 February, the Council approved President Khalifa bin Zayed Al Nahyan's nomination of Sheikh Mohammed for prime minister.

Mohammed is the absolute monarch of Dubai. The government is described as autocratic, as there are no democratic institutions, and internal dissent is prohibited. Scholars characterize the UAE as authoritarian. According to human rights organizations, there are systematic human rights violations, including the torture and forced disappearance of government critics. There is a blurred line between the assets of the state of Dubai and those of the Al Maktoum ruling family.

Mohammed issued a law in 2006 to form the Dubai Establishment for Women Development, renamed by law in 2009 as the Dubai Women Establishment. He also formed the UAE Gender Balance Council in 2015.

On 19 October 2020, Mohammed led the UAE Council of Ministers meeting that ratified a peace agreement with Israel, normalizing diplomatic relationships between the countries. The Council, again headed by Mohammed, approved the decision to found an Emirati embassy in Tel Aviv in January, and Mohammed swore in the first Emirati ambassador to Israel, Mahmoud Al Khajah, a month later.

==== Space exploration ====
Mohammed founded the Mohammed bin Rashid Space Centre in 2015, which announced it would be launching a spacecraft to Mars to study the planet’s atmosphere; He stated that the planet was chosen for its "epic challenge", saying it would benefit the Emirati economy. He announced that the mission would be called Hope after a public vote, as the name would "send a message of optimism to millions of young Arabs," since "Arab civilisation once played a great role in contributing to human knowledge, and [would] play that role again."

Mohammed announced that the Hope mission had succeeded at orbit insertion on 9 February 2021, and shared the first picture the probe had captured days later. Hope became the first Arab mission to space, as well as the first of three missions in July 2020—the others from the United States and China–to arrive at Mars.

In 2020, Mohammed announced a second mission, this one to the moon. The Emirates Lunar Mission used a lunar rover, named Rashid, reportedly built entirely in the UAE. It was launched on 11 December 2022 on a Falcon 9 Block 5 rocket. In a historic first, his book The Journey from the Desert to the Stars was launched from the International Space Station through Emirati astronaut Sultan Al Neyadi.

== Business career ==
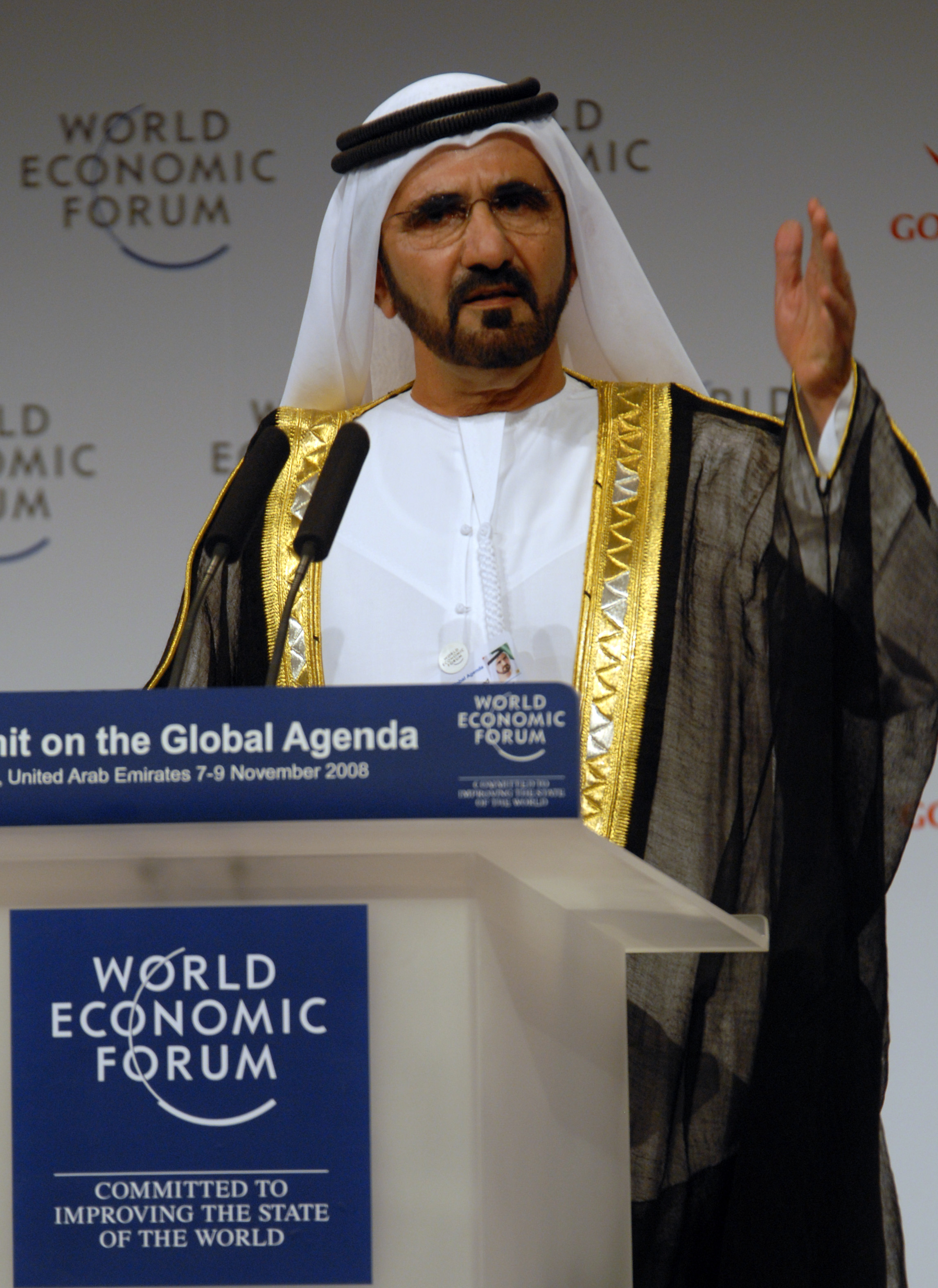
At the World Economic Forum Summit on the Global Agenda, 2008

Mohammed has overseen the creation and growth of a number of businesses and economic assets of Dubai, with a number held by two companies under his ownership, Dubai World and Dubai Holding. According to the laws of Dubai, the ruling family owns all undeveloped land in Dubai, which has allowed the family to prosper from real estate development. During Mohammed's rule, Dubai has seen enormous population growth, causing a real estate boom in Dubai. The boom was in part facilitated by Sheikh Mohammed's 2002 decree that foreigners would be allowed to purchase property in Dubai.

Mohammed established Dubai World by decree, leading to the company's launch on 2 July 2006, as a holding company consolidating a number of assets including logistics company, DP World, property developer Nakheel Properties, and investment company Istithmar World. With more than 50,000 employees in over 100 cities around the globe, the Group has real estate, logistics and other business investments in the United States, the United Kingdom, and South Africa. The company is owned by the government of Dubai.

Sheikh Mohammed's personal corporate portfolio is the Dubai Holding Group, which is involved in a variety of investments. Dubai Holding benefits from its association with the ruling family of Dubai, and is given free land by the Dubai government.

Mohammed was responsible for the launch of the Emirates airline.

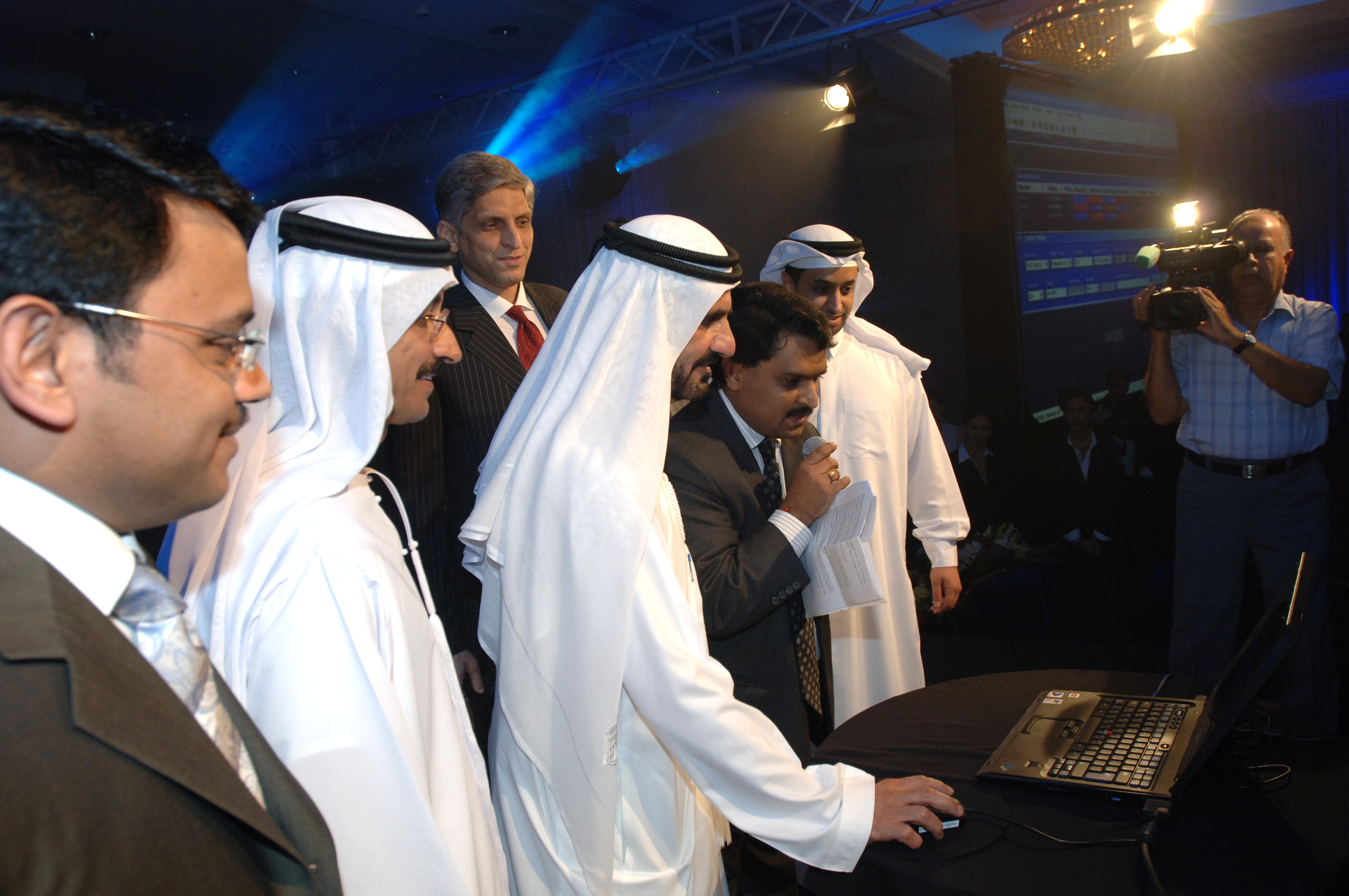
Inauguration of the Dubai Gold & Commodities Exchange in 2005 by Mohammed and DP World CEO Sultan Ahmed bin Sulayem

=== Launch of the Emirates airline ===
Through the 1970s, as well as his role as head of Dubai Defence Force and UAE Minister of Defence, Mohammed oversaw Dubai's energy resources and was in charge of the Dubai Civil Aviation Authority. It was in this latter role, in March 1985, that he founded the Emirates airline, tasking then-head of Dnata, Maurice Flanagan, with launching a new airline to be called Emirates after a dispute with Gulf Air over Dubai's 'Open Skies' policy. The launch budget of the airline was $10 million (the amount Flanagan said he needed to launch an airline) and its inaugural flight took place on 25 October 1985. Sheikh Mohammed appointed his uncle Sheikh Ahmed bin Saeed Al Maktoum as chairman of the new company. A further $75 million in facilities and materials was provided, but Emirates has always maintained that it has received no further subsidies throughout the company's meteoric growth to become one of the world's leading airlines.

In 1989, Mohammed inaugurated the first Dubai Airshow. In 2013, the exhibition had grown to over 1,000 exhibiting companies, and was the venue for Emirates' placement of the largest aeroplane order in history, with $99 billion combined orders with Airbus for its A380 and Boeing for its 777X.

=== Burj Al Arab and Jumeirah ===
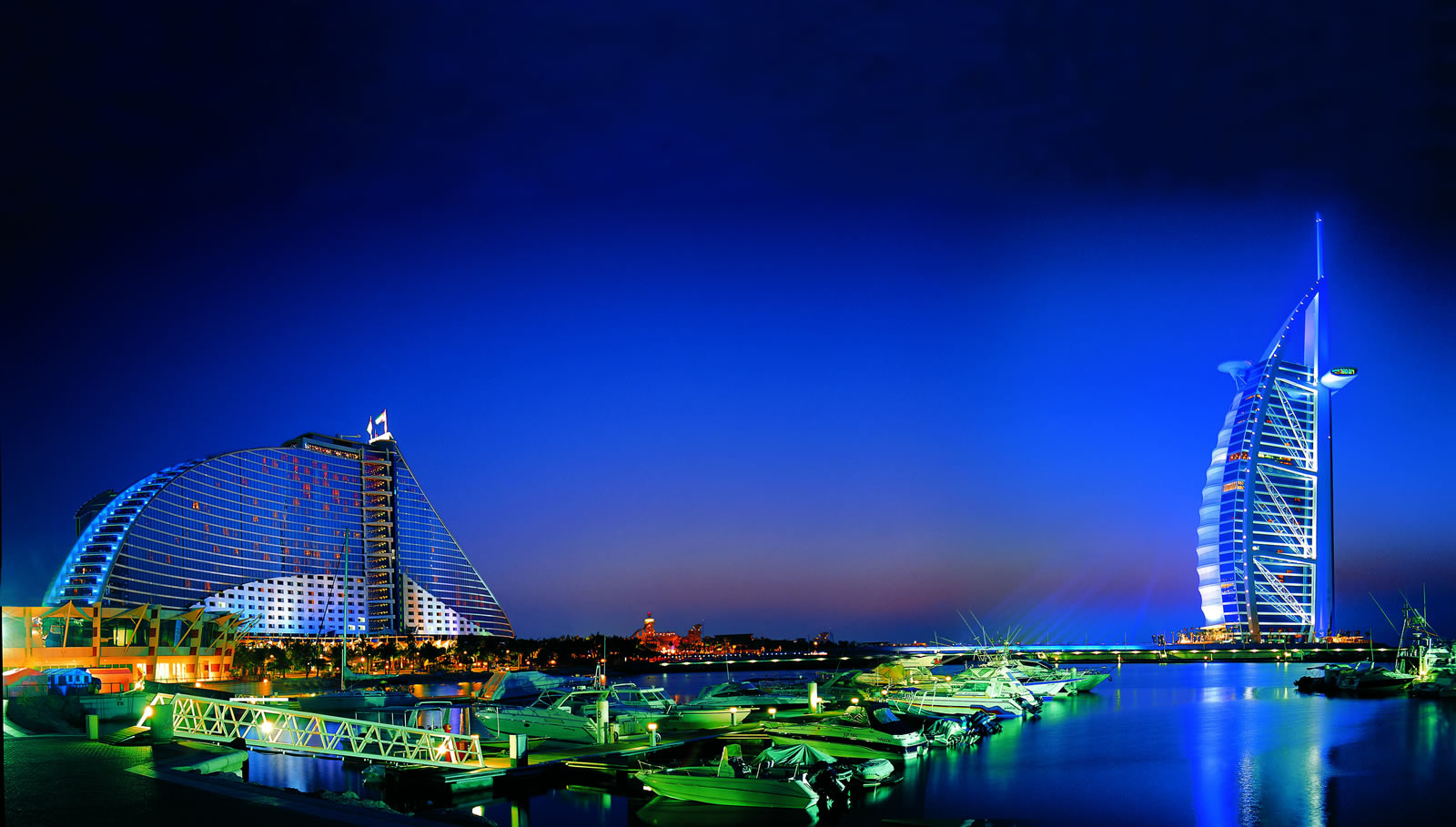
Burj Al Arab and Jumeirah Beach

The Burj Al Arab was inaugurated in December 1999. The hotel, constructed from a design by WS Atkins in response to a brief from Mohammed to create "a truly iconic" building, styles itself as "the world's most luxurious hotel". It was constructed on an island offshore from the Jumeirah Beach Hotel, the first property managed by Jumeirah, the hotel management company launched by Mohammed in 1997 and headed by ex-Trust House Forte executive Gerald Lawless. While work began on both hotels at the same time, the island to house the Burj Al Arab required three years to build before construction began above ground. Jumeirah's international expansion, driven after it became part of Dubai Holding in 2004, encompasses 22 hotels in ten countries.

=== Dubai Internet City and TECOM ===
On 29 October 1999, Mohammed announced Dubai Internet City, a technology hub and free trade zone. Offering companies long leases, full ownership, and fast access to government services, DIC grew from its first tenants in October 2000, to a current zone employing about 15,000 people. In November 2000, it was joined by Dubai Media City, a content and media production-free zone, which is co-located with DIC. The launch of DIC came with assurances from Mohammed regarding media freedoms. In 2007, he issued a decree banning the imprisonment of journalists following an incident in which local journalists were accused of libel and sentenced to jail terms.

=== Palm Islands ===
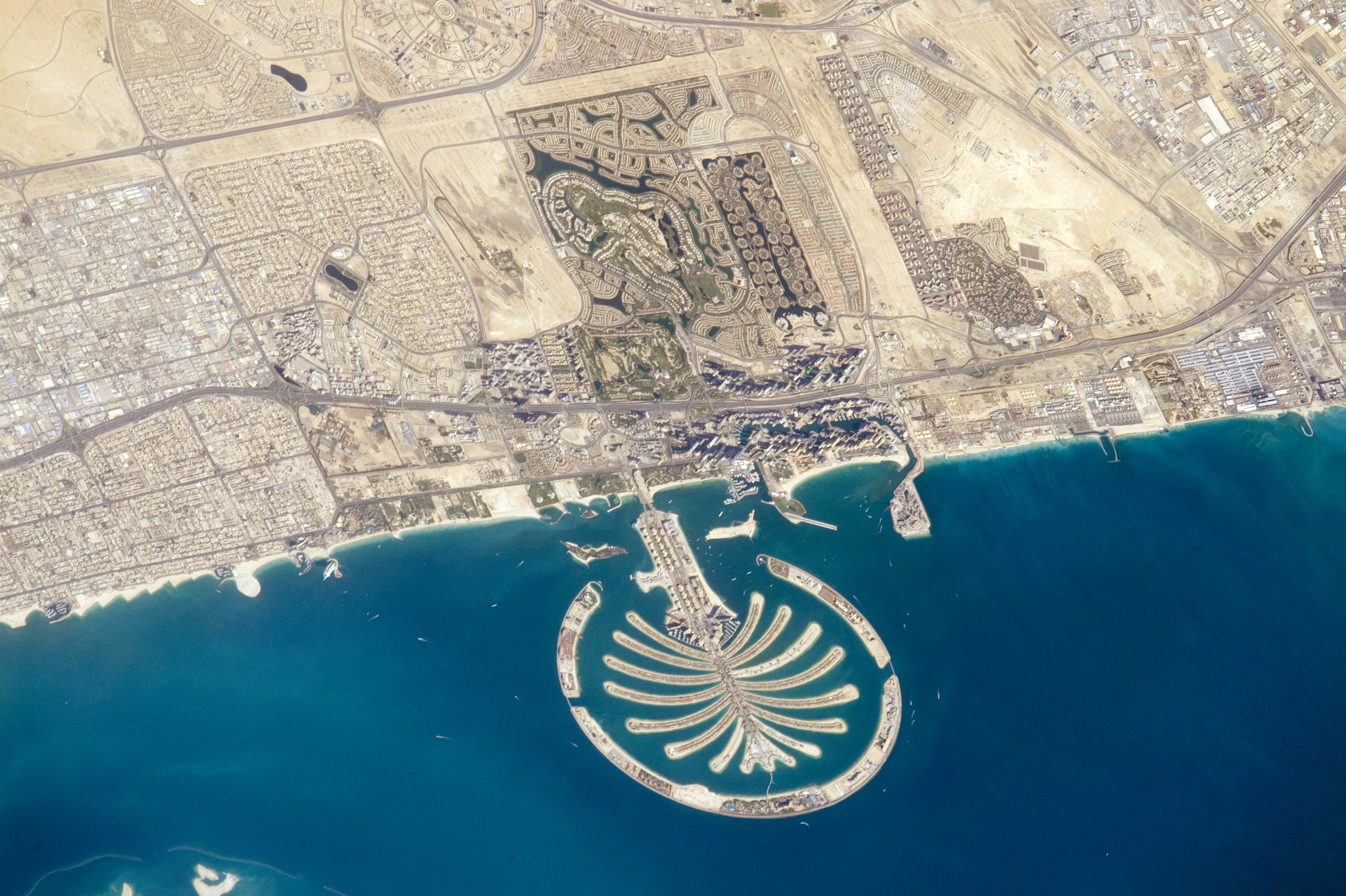
Palm Jumeirah seen from space

The Palm Islands were developed by Nakheel Properties, which Mohammed founded.

== Interests, activities and philanthropic work ==
=== Mohammed bin Rashid Global initiatives (MBRGI) ===
The Mohammed bin Rashid Global Initiatives is a charitable foundation which consolidates the work of some 33 charitable foundations, entities and initiatives which, together, implement more than 1,400 development programs, including the Sheikh Mohammed bin Rashid Centre for Cultural Understanding (SMCCU).

=== Mohammed bin Rashid School of Government ===
The Mohammed bin Rashid School of Government (previously the Dubai School of Government) is an academic and research institution in the area of public policy and administration.

=== Aid to Palestine ===
Mohammed made a grant of 600 houses to Gaza following the 2008–2009 Gaza war.

=== Aiding mosque construction in the Netherlands ===
In 2000, Mohammed donated €4 million for the construction of the Essalaam Mosque in Rotterdam, the Netherlands.

In June 2017, two new initiatives were added to the Mohammed Bin Rashid Global Initiatives, within the "Empowering Communities" sector, namely the International Institute for Tolerance and the Sheikh Mohammed Bin Rashid Award for Tolerance. In this respect, Sheikh Mohammed issued Law No. (9) of 2017 on the Establishment of the International Institute for Tolerance and Decree No. (23) of 2017 on the Formation of a Board of Trustees and Decree No. (28) of 2017 on the Appointment of a Managing Director for the International Institute for Tolerance. In this respect, Law No. (9) of 2017 includes the launch of the Sheikh Mohammed Bin Rashid Award for Tolerance, administered in accordance with the provisions and statute of said Law. Hence, the establishment of the International Institute for Tolerance aims at instilling a spirit of tolerance across the community, building a cohesive society, strengthening the UAE's standing and position as a model of tolerance, as well as renouncing extremism and all forms of discrimination among people on the basis of religion, sex, race, color or language, in addition to honoring all entities and institutions contributing to the promotion of tolerance and open, interfaith dialogue.

=== Sporting interests ===
Mohammed is a major figure in international thoroughbred horse racing and breeding. He owns Darley Stud, the biggest horse breeding operation in the world with farms in the United States, Ireland, England, and Australia. In 1985 he bought the Irish thoroughbred Park Appeal for an undisclosed sum at the end of her second season. She went on to produce at least nine winners from twelve foals and is the ancestor of many successful horses.

Mohammed had raced horses as a child (he would share his breakfast with his horse on the way to school) but he attended his first formal race at Newmarket in 1967 with his brother Hamdan, watching Royal Palace win the 2,000 guineas. Becoming an owner in his own right, ten years later he won his first race with Hatta at Brighton. And five years after that, Mohammed and Hamdan had three studs and 100 horses under training.

Racing silks of Mohammed (Darley Racing)

In late 1981, Mohammed purchased Gainsborough Stud at Woolton Hill, near Newbury, Berkshire, United Kingdom. He owns Ballysheehan Stud in County Tipperary, Ireland; as well as Gainsborough Farm Inc. in Versailles, Kentucky, United States. His racing operations include the ownership of Darley Stables and he is the leading partner in his family's Godolphin Stables. Mohammed hosts the Dubai World Cup at Meydan Racecourse.

By 1992, Mohammed had started 'wintering' his horses in Dubai, frequently against the advice of trainers and pundits in the UK. The results were a string of high-profile wins, and by 1994 he founded Godolphin. In 1995, his hands-on approach to racing resulted in a major split with leading trainer Henry Cecil after a disagreement over racing a horse Mohammed insisted was injured. Cecil took the argument public and Mohammed removed all his horses from Cecil's stable.

Godolphin's first win, Balanchine taking the Oaks at Epsom Downs, England, in 1994, was to mark the beginning of a winning streak with horses such as Lammtarra, Daylami, Fantastic Light, Street Cry, Sulamani, Dubawi, and Ramonti among them. Dubai Millennium, said to be Mohammed's favourite, won nine of his ten starts before succumbing to injury followed by grass sickness in 2001.

In 1996, the Dubai World Cup was inaugurated as the world's richest horserace, drawing the legendary American dirt track horse Cigar to race in Dubai. Today, held at the Meydan Racecourse, the race meeting carries a prize of $27 million.

In the UK, Mohammed's horses have won Group One races including several of the British Classic Races. His horses have also won the Irish Derby Stakes, the Prix de l'Arc de Triomphe and, the 2006 Preakness Stakes with Bernardini in the US. In 2008, he bought the Woodlands Stud empire for more than $460 million. The same year, he nearly bought out Charlton Athletic but he later turned down.

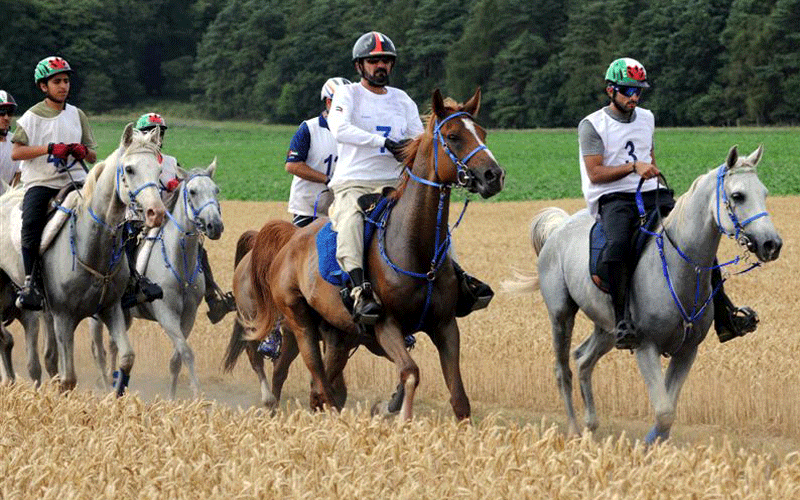
Sheikh Mohammed and his son Hamdan participating in an endurance ride

At the age of 63, Mohammed won the 2012 World Endurance Championship over a 160 km course. Both his thoroughbreds and endurance horses have failed drug tests – although his trainers (including Mahmood Al Zarooni) have accepted the blame. His endurance racing stable has also been involved in other scandals, including both fatal injuries, and ringers. In 2015, the FEI suspended the United Arab Emirates following a series of scandals.

In the 15th Asian Games in 2006, the sheikh's eldest son, Rashid bin Mohammed Al Maktoum, took the individual gold in endurance riding. Mohammed's sons Rashid, Ahmed, Majid, and Hamdan took the team gold in endurance riding, his niece Latifa took a bronze in show jumping, and his daughter Maitha led the UAE team in taekwondo. In 2013, when the UAE national football team won the Gulf Cup, Mohammed gave the team 50 million dirhams ($13.7 million). His wife awarded the team a further 25 million dirhams ($6.8 million), while their grandsons contributed 12 million dirhams ($3.3 million).

Godolphin's Cross Counter, ridden by Kerrin McEvoy and trained by Charlie Appleby won the 2018 Melbourne Cup.

== Controversies ==
=== Sheikha Latifa and Sheikha Shamsa kidnapping allegations ===
Mohammed has three daughters named Latifa. The other two daughters are not connected to this allegation.

An early 2000s British police investigation of allegations, made by a former riding instructor about the attempted escape of Mohammed's daughter Latifa (born 1985) from her family estate in England and the subsequent kidnapping on a street in Cambridge of Latifa's sister Shamsa in 2001, was inconclusive. He has been indicted due to the mistreatment of Sheikha Latifa Al Maktoum since then.

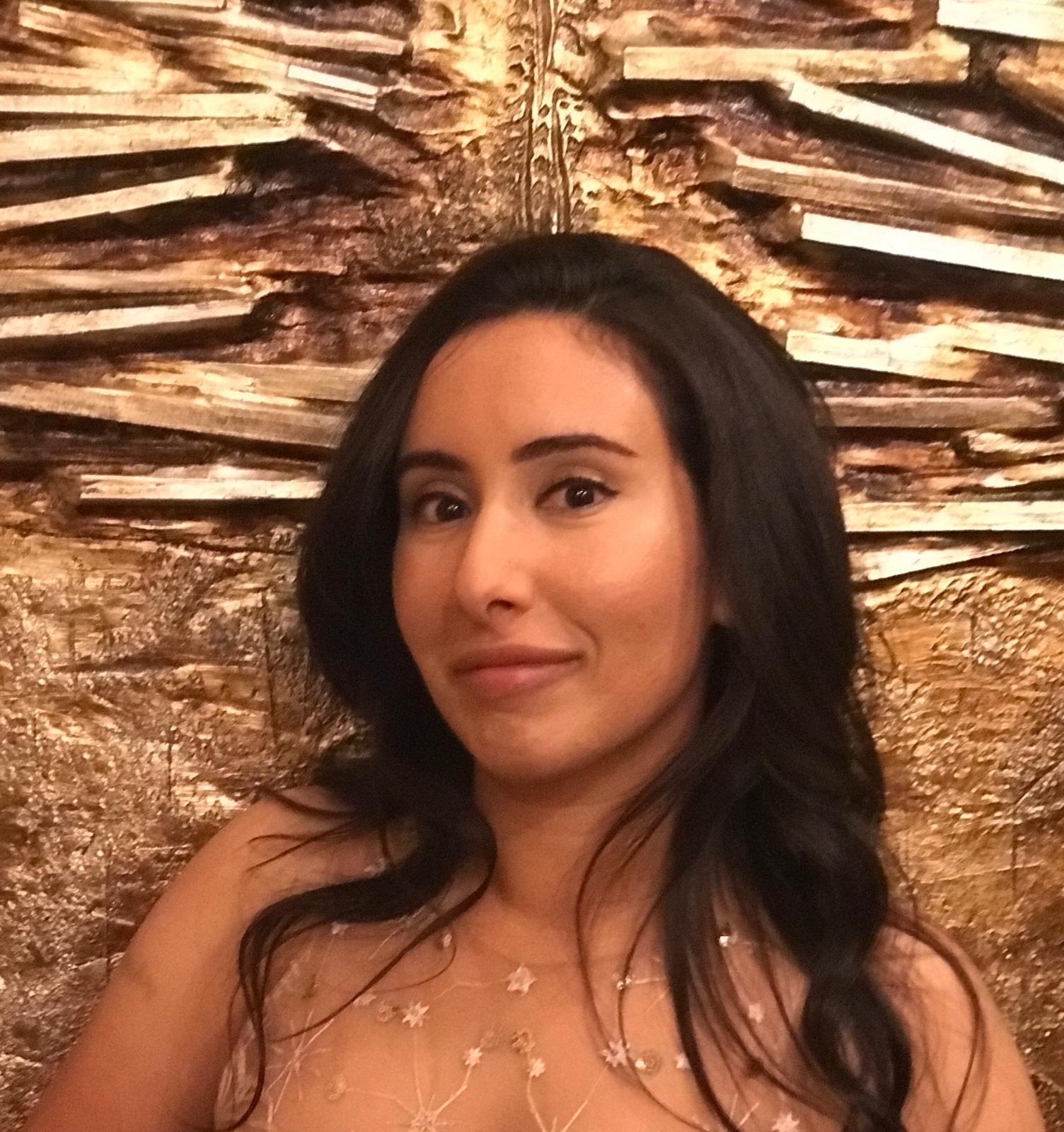
Sheikha Latifa escaped Dubai before being captured in the Indian Ocean.

On 11 March 2018, a video was released of Sheikha Latifa after her failed attempt to flee the UAE and subsequent disappearance, in which she claimed she was fleeing from her family, made allegations of abuse, and said her father was responsible for a number of murders, including the murder of his deceased older brother's wife. The escape attempt was the focus of a documentary by Australian broadcaster Nine News as well as BBC Newsnight investigation.

In December 2018, former United Nations High Commissioner for Human Rights Mary Robinson, after meeting Latifa in the presence of other family members, said that Latifa was now in the care of her family. Her statement was criticised by human rights groups, who said that Robinson would not have been able to tell in the meeting whether Latifa truly had psychological issues. A spokeswoman for "The Mary Robinson Foundation – Climate Justice" confirmed that Robinson was approached by Latifa's stepmother Princess Haya bint Hussein, an old friend of Robinson's, and was requested to go to Dubai by Princess Haya and that Haya paid the fare, less than two weeks after the BBC ran a documentary detailing Latifa's failed escape attempt in March. Robinson admits she was "horribly tricked" when photographs of the private lunch were made public and that both she and Haya had been told of details of Latifa's bipolar disorder, a condition which she does not have. Latifa's cousin Marcus Essabri reported that Latifa's photos with Mary Robinson seem to show Latifa medicated while held in Dubai under her father's orders.

In February 2021, video footage obtained by the BBC showed Latifa saying she has been "a hostage" for over a year "with no access to medical help" in "solitary confinement" without access to medical or legal help in a "villa jail" with windows and doors barred shut, and guarded by police. The governments of Dubai and the UAE have not responded to requests for comment from the BBC. Despite her family's insistence that she has been enjoying time with them at home the past two years, Latifa says in the series of videos released by her advocates that she is "a hostage" and fears for her life. "Every day, I'm worried about my safety in my life. I don't really know if I'm going to survive this situation. The police threaten me that they would take me outside and shoot me if I didn't cooperate with them," she said. "They also threatened me that I would be in prison my whole life and I'll never see the sun again."

In 2021, investigative reporting into the Pegasus spyware found that Latifa's name was added to a list of names that were potential targets of the spyware just days before she was seized by Indian commandos, off the coast of India, while she was aboard a yacht in an attempt to flee Dubai. A brief statement issued on Latifa's behalf by law firm Taylor Wessing stated that she was free to travel and requested privacy. In the same year the #FreeLatifa campaign ended after Latifa had been photographed in public places such as Dubai, Spain and Iceland.

In February 2022, the UN High Commissioner for Human Rights, Michelle Bachelet, stated that she met Latifa in Paris and that Latifa was well and wished for respect for her privacy.

=== Princess Haya escape ===
In June 2019, Princess Haya fled Dubai along with her two children, a son and a daughter, and was in Germany seeking political asylum. A subsequent poem composed by Mohammed (an occasional couplet-writer) and posted on Instagram alluded to betrayal in love.

Haya moved from Germany to the United Kingdom, filed for sole custody of their two children, a forced marriage protection order (FMPO), and a non-molestation order at the High Court of Justice in London in July 2019.

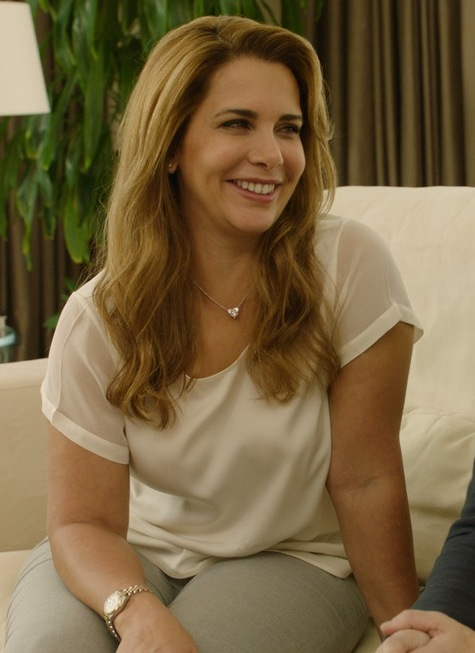
Princess Haya bint Hussein

In December 2019, a UK family court ruled that, on the balance of probabilities, Mohammed may have committed the crime of "taunting" Haya after her adulterous affair with a bodyguard became known, which verbal "taunting", the court held, amounted to subjecting Haya to "a campaign of intimidation", reportedly including guns placed on her pillow. The findings were published in March 2021. In October 2021, the High Court ruled that Mohammed's agents used the Israeli Pegasus spyware to hack the phones of Princess Haya, her solicitors, a personal assistant and two members of her security team in the summer of 2020. The court ruled that the agents acted "with the express or implied authority" of the sheikh; he denied knowledge of the hacking. The judgment referred to the hacking as "serial breaches of (UK) domestic criminal law", "in violation of fundamental common law and ECHR rights", "interference with the process of this court and the mother's access to justice" and "abuse of power" by a head of state.

In December 2021, Haya was granted full custody of her children, and alimony and support in the amount of US$720 million. In 2022, the court ordered that there should be no direct contact between Mohammed and his children, and no input by him into decision-making about their lives.

=== Child camel jockeys ===
In September 2006, Mohammed was accused of encouraging the abduction and enslavement of thousands of boys for use as jockeys in camel races. A class-action suit was filed against him in the US state of Florida. In 2006, American lawyers representing the UAE raised a motion to dismiss the lawsuit on the grounds that none of the involved parties resided in the US, arguing that the UN program best served the interests of the children. In July 2007, Judge Cecilia Altonaga accepted the motion and dismissed the suit.

A 2006 UNICEF-sponsored program with the UAE government resulted in the repatriation of hundreds of children formerly enslaved as camel jockeys, and provided them with social services and compensation upon return to their home countries of Pakistan, Sudan, Mauritania, and Bangladesh. The UAE government set aside US$2.7 million in initial funding in 2005 with an additional $9 million for the second phase, and to enforce compliance, adopted a law officially banning the practice with penalties of jail time and a $27,200 fine. UNICEF endorsed the UAE's efforts and expressed the hopes that "the UAE's programme will serve as a model to other countries in the region, as a means of ending all forms of exploitation of children".

=== Horse racing drugs scandal ===
In April 2013, Mohammed's Godolphin stables trainer Mahmood Al Zarooni was disqualified for eight years from thoroughbred horse racing by the British Horseracing Authority for administering steroids to eleven racehorses. Mohammed stated that he was "appalled and angered" by the case and announced that the stable would be locked down while drug tests were carried out on all horses under Al Zarooni's care. In May, Mohammed, as prime minister of the UAE, issued a decree outlawing and criminalizing the use of anabolic steroids on horses in the UAE. His son, Hamdan bin Mohammed Al Maktoum, had previously been banned from competition after it was found one of his horses was competing while on a steroid.

In October 2013, Mohammed faced another scandal in the venue of horseracing, with reports of potentially toxic and dangerous steroids, anaesthetics, and anti-inflammatory drugs being shipped into the UAE, mislabeled as "horse tack". The Telegraph commented that a "PR campaign is already underway, with Sheikh Mohammed again cast as a victim of employee malpractice".

=== Pandora Papers ===
In October 2021, an investigation by the International Consortium of Investigative Journalists (ICIJ) revealed that over 330 prominent politicians and public officials across the world had ties with offshore companies. Amongst them were 35 current and former world leaders. The leaked 11.9 million files revealed that Mohammed bin Rashid Al Maktoum also used offshore companies to manage and expand his wealth. In order to carry out his dealings, he registered three companies in the tax havens of the British Virgin Islands (BVI) and the Bahamas. Registered by an Emirati firm, Axiom Limited, the three companies were Tandem Investco Limited and Tandem DirectorCo Limited in BVI and Allied International Investments Limited in the Bahamas. Partly owned by the Dubai Holding, in which Mohammed owns major shares, Axiom Limited used the three companies to "expand its core business".

== Personal life ==
Sheikh Mohammed has 26 children from several wives.

One of Sheikh Mohammed's ex-wives is Princess Haya bint Hussein, daughter of former King Hussein of Jordan and half-sister of King Abdullah II of Jordan. In 2022, the High Court of England and Wales ruled and mandated that Sheikh Mohammed must not have direct contact with his children by Princess Haya, or input into decision-making about them, because of his coercive and abusive behaviour which "had emotionally and psychologically harmed their children".

On 19 September 2022, he attended the state funeral of Queen Elizabeth II at Westminster Abbey, London.

In addition to Arabic, he also speaks English.

=== Wealth and assets ===
In 2021, the Organized Crime and Corruption Reporting Project estimated that Sheikh Mohammed owned assets worth $14 billion.

Sheikh Mohammed owns the yacht named Dubai, built by the German company Blohm + Voss and designed by English designer Andrew Winch, who owns Winch Design. The yacht is 162 metres (531 ft) long, and was the world's third largest yacht as of 2014, with the capacity for up to 115 people including crew. Another of his yachts is the 40 metres (130 ft) Alloya, built by Sanlorenzo in 2013.

Sheikh Mohammed owns real estate in the United Kingdom worth more than 100 million British pounds, as well as properties in Rome through a company registered in Luxembourg. According to a 2021 analysis by The Guardian and Transparency International, Sheikh Mohammed is one of the largest landowners in the UK, owning more than 100,000 acres. The exact number of properties is not known, as most of the properties connected to him are owned through offshore companies in the tax havens of Guernsey and Jersey. When asked about these holdings, Sheikh Mohammed's lawyer rejected that the properties were bought through offshore companies or that the holdings were intended to avoid UK taxes.

In the 2021 Pandora Papers leaks, it was revealed that Sheikh Mohammed was a shareholder in three additional companies registered in jurisdictions allowing secrecy.

=== Wives and children ===
Mohammed has been married to at least eight women. As of 2023, he is divorced from all his wives except his first wife, Sheikha Hind bint Maktoum Al Maktoum.

==== Hind bint Maktoum bin Juma Al Maktoum ====
They were married in 1979. They are cousins, and together they have 12 children:

- Sheikha Hessa bint Mohammed Al Maktoum (born 6 November 1980). She is married to Sheikh Saeed bin Dalmouk Al Maktoum and they have three children:
  - Sheikha Hind bint Saeed Al Maktoum (born 25 November 2009).
  - Sheikh Rashid bin Saeed Al Maktoum (born 20 May 2012).
  - Sheikha Salama bint Saeed Al Maktoum (born 17 July 2018).
- Sheikh Rashid bin Mohammed Al Maktoum (12 November 1981 – 19 September 2015) – died at the age of 33.
- Sheikh Hamdan bin Mohammed Al Maktoum (born 14 November 1982), Crown Prince of Dubai (since 2008), Deputy Prime Minister of UAE (since 2024), and Defence Minister of UAE (since 2024). He is married to Sheikha Shaikha bint Saeed bin Thani Al Maktoum. He has four children:
  - Sheikh Rashid bin Hamdan Al Maktoum (born 20 May 2021).
  - Sheikha Shaikha bint Hamdan Al Maktoum (born 20 May 2021).
  - Sheikh Mohammed bin Hamdan Al Maktoum (born 25 February 2023).
  - Sheikha Hind bint Hamdan Al Maktoum (born 22 March 2025).
- Sheikh Maktoum bin Mohammed Al Maktoum (born 24 November 1983), First Deputy Ruler of Dubai (since 2008), Deputy Prime Minister of the UAE (since 2021), UAE Minister of Finance (since 2021). He is married to Sheikha Maryam bint Butti bin Maktoum Al Maktoum, and they have five daughters:
  - Sheikha Hind bint Maktoum Al Maktoum (born 24 November 2020).
  - Sheikha Latifa bint Maktoum Al Maktoum (born 11 January 2022).
  - Sheikha Shaikha bint Maktoum Al Maktoum (born 25 January 2023).
  - Sheikha Maryam bint Maktoum Al Maktoum (born 7 July 2025).
  - Sheikha Futtaim bint Maktoum Al Maktoum (born 18 June 2026).
- Sheikh Ahmed bin Mohammed Al Maktoum (born 7 February 1987), Second Deputy Ruler of Dubai (since 2023). He is married to Sheikha Madiyah bint Dalmook Al Maktoum. They have two daughters:
  - Sheikha Hind bint Ahmed Al Maktoum (born 22 October 2022).
  - Sheikha Maryam bint Ahmed Al Maktoum (born 6 May 2026).
- Sheikh Saeed bin Mohammed Al Maktoum (born 20 March 1988).
- Sheikha Latifa bint Mohammed Al Maktoum (III) (born 30 March 1989). She is married to Sheikh Mohammed bin Hamad bin Mohammed Al Sharqi, Crown Prince of Fujairah, and they have five children:
  - Sheikh Hamad bin Mohammed Al Sharqi (born 29 December 2009).
  - Sheikha Aisha bint Mohammed Al Sharqi (born 1 November 2011).
  - Sheikha Fatima bint Mohammed Al Sharqi (born 11 March 2014).
  - Sheikh Rashid bin Mohammed Al Sharqi (born 15 December 2015).
  - Sheikha Hind bint Mohammed Al Sharqi (born 22 June 2020).
- Sheikha Maryam bint Mohammed Al Maktoum (II) (born 11 January 1992). She is married to Sheikh Khaled bin Mohammed bin Hamdan Al Nahyan, and they have three sons:
  - Sheikh Mohammed bin Khaled Al Nahyan (born 25 September 2020).
  - Sheikh Hamdan bin Khaled Al Nahyan (born 25 August 2021).
  - Sheikh Khalifa bin Khaled Al Nahyan (born 10 October 2022).
- Sheikha Shaikha bint Mohammed Al Maktoum (born 20 December 1992). She is married to Sheikh Nasser bin Hamad Al Khalifa, and they have five children:
  - Sheikha Sheema bint Nasser Al Khalifa (born 16 July 2010).
  - Sheikh Hamad bin Nasser Al Khalifa (born 6 June 2012).
  - Sheikh Mohammad bin Nasser Al Khalifa (born 6 June 2012).
  - Sheikh Hamdan bin Nasser Al Khalifa (born 28 October 2018).
  - Sheikh Khalid bin Nasser Al Khalifa (born 15 February 2022).
- Sheikha Futtaim bint Mohammed Al Maktoum (born 22 July 1994).
- Sheikha Salamah bint Mohammed Al Maktoum (born 8 August 1999).
- Sheikha Shamma bint Mohammed Al Maktoum (born 13 November 2001).

==== Haya bint Hussein ====
Sheikh Mohammed married Princess Haya bint Hussein on 10 April 2004, and they divorced on 7 February 2019. They have two children:

- Sheikha Al Jalila bint Mohammed Al Maktoum (born 2 December 2007).
- Sheikh Zayed bin Mohammed Al Maktoum (born 7 January 2012).

==== Randa bint Mohammed Al-Banna ====
Sheikh Mohammed married Randa bint Mohammed Al-Banna in 1972. They later divorced. They have one daughter:

- Sheikha Manal bint Mohammed Al Maktoum (born 12 November 1977). She is married to Sheikh Mansour bin Zayed Al Nahyan, and they have five children:
  - Sheikha Fatima bint Mansour Al Nahyan (born 9 June 2006).
  - Sheikh Mohammed bin Mansour Al Nahyan (born 4 December 2007).
  - Sheikh Hamdan bin Mansour Al Nahyan (born 21 June 2011).
  - Sheikha Latifa bint Mansour Al Nahyan (born 23 January 2014).
  - Sheikh Rashid bin Mansour Al Nahyan (born 22 March 2017).

==== Delila Aloula ====
Mohammed has three daughters from his marriage to Delila Aloula:

- Sheikha Dalal bint Mohammed Al Maktoum
- Sheikha Latifa bint Mohammed Al Maktoum (I) (born 16 June 1983). She is married to Sheikh Faisal bin Saud bin Khalid Al Qassimi and they have four children:
  - Sheikh Muhammad bin Faisal Al Qassimi (born 28 July 2018).
  - Sheikha Shaikha bint Faisal Al Qassimi (born 29 October 2020).
  - Sheikh Hamdan bin Faisal Al Qassimi (born 24 December 2021).
  - Sheikha Hind bint Faisal Al Qassimi (born 14 May 2023).
- Sheikha Maryam bint Mohammed Al Maktoum (I) (born 11 August 1987). She is married to Sheikh Suhail bin Ahmed Al Maktoum and they have five children:
  - Sheikha Fatima bint Suhail Al Maktoum (born 26 September 2019).
  - Sheikh Ahmed bin Suhail Al Maktoum (born 1 December 2020).
  - Sheikha Latifa bint Suhail Al Maktoum (born 17 February 2022).
  - Sheikha Hessa bint Suhail Al Maktoum (born 3 February 2024).
  - Sheikh Mohammed bin Suhail Al Maktoum (born 20 October 2025).

==== Houria Ahmed Lamara ====
From his marriage to Houria Ahmed Lamara, Mohammed has five children:

- Sheikha Maitha bint Mohammed Al Maktoum (born 5 March 1980).
- Sheikha Shamsa bint Mohammed Al Maktoum (born 15 August 1981).
- Sheikha Latifa bint Mohammed Al Maktoum (II) (born 5 December 1985).
- Sheikh Majid bin Mohammed Al Maktoum (born 16 October 1987). He is married to Hessa Beljafla and they have five children:
  - Sheikh Mohammed bin Majid Al Maktoum (born 15 July 2015).
  - Sheikha Dubai bint Majid Al Maktoum (born 15 July 2015).
  - Sheikha Maitha bint Majid Al Maktoum (born 17 May 2017).
  - Sheikh Rashid bin Majid Al Maktoum (born 2 February 2019).
  - Sheikh Maktoum bin Majid Al Maktoum (born 15 July 2022).
- Sheikh Mansoor bin Mohammed Al Maktoum (born 26 June 1989).

==== Umm Marwan ====
Mohammed has a son with one of his former wives:

- Sheikh Marwan bin Mohammed Al Maktoum (born 20 March 1981). He is married to Dalal Al Marzouq and they have two sons:
  - Sheikh Mohammed bin Marwan Al Maktoum
  - Sheikh Rashid bin Marwan Al Maktoum (born 18 June 2013)

==== Zoe Grigorakos ====
Mohammed has one daughter from his marriage to Zoe Grigorakos:

- Sheikha Mahra bint Mohammed Al Maktoum (born 26 February 1994). She was married to Sheikh Mana bin Mohammed bin Rashid bin Mana Al Maktoum from 2023 until her divorce in 2024.
  - Sheikha Mahra bint Mana Al Maktoum (born 1 May 2024)

==== Dalya Al Muthanna ====
Sheikh Mohammed was married to Dr. Dalya Al Muthanna. They have one daughter:

- Sheikha Haya bint Mohammed Al Maktoum (born 1 October 2000)

== Honours ==
- Brazil: Collar of the Order of the Southern Cross awarded by President Jair Bolsonaro (12 November 2021).
- Bahrain: Collar of the Order of Sheikh Isa bin Salman Al Khalifa
- KSA: First Class of the Order of King Abdulaziz
- Spain: Grand Cross of the Order of Charles III
- Morocco: Grand Cordon of the Order of the Throne
- Netherlands: Knight Grand Cross of the Order of Orange-Nassau awarded by Queen Beatrix (8 February 1974)
- UAE: Collar of the Order of Zayed (2 December 2012)
- United Kingdom: Honorary Knight Grand Cross of the Order of St Michael and St George (GCMG) awarded by Queen Elizabeth II (25 November 2010).
- United Kingdom: Knight Grand Cross of the Order of the British Empire (GBE)

== Ancestry ==
The ancestry of Mohammed bin Rashid Al Maktoum is as follows:

Ancestors of Mohammed bin Rashid Al Maktoum

16. Sheikh Hasher bin Maktoum Al Maktoum
8. Sheikh Maktoum bin Hasher Al Maktoum
4. Sheikh Saeed bin Maktoum Al Maktoum
2. Sheikh Rashid bin Saeed Al Maktoum
20. Sheikh Hureiz Al Falasi
10. Sheikh Al Mur bin Hureiz Al Falasi
5. Sheikha Hassa bint Al Mur Al Falasi
1. Sheikh Mohammed bin Rashid Al Maktoum
24. Sheikh Khalifa bin Shakhbut Al Nahyan
12. Sheikh Zayed bin Khalifa Al Nahyan
25. Sheikha Moza bint Abdullah Al Suwaidi
6. Sheikh Hamdan bin Zayed Al Nahyan
26. Sheikh Mohammed bin Saif Al Falahi
13. Sheikha Maryam bint Mohammed Al Falahi
3. Sheikha Latifa bint Hamdan Al Nahyan
28. Sheikh Mejren Al Falasi
14. Sheikh Obaid bin Mejren Al Falasi
7. Sheikha Shamsa bint Obaid Al Falasi

== See also ==
- Mohammed bin Rashid Al Maktoum Solar Park
- Timeline of Dubai

Mohammed bin Rashid Al Maktoum House of Al Maktoum Born: 15 July 1949
Regnal titles
Preceded by Maktoum bin Rashid Al Maktoum	Ruler of Dubai; 2006–present	Incumbent; Heir: Hamdan bin Mohammed Al Maktoum
Political offices
Preceded by Maktoum bin Rashid Al Maktoum	Prime Minister and Vice President of the United Arab Emirates; 2006–present	Incumbent
Preceded by Khalifa bin Zayed Al Nahyan	Acting President of the United Arab Emirates; 2022	Succeeded by Mohamed bin Zayed Al Nahyan
