= Mohammed bin Rashid School of Government =

University in Dubai (2005-)

Coordinates: 25°13′20″N 55°17′21″E

Mohammed Bin Rashid School of Government
- كلية محمد بن راشد للإدارة الحكومية
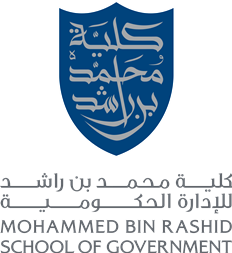
- Type: Public university
- Established: 2005
- President: Dr. Ali Sebaa Al Marri
- Location: Zaabeel, Dubai, UAE
- Publications: DSG NEWS
- Website: www.mbrsg.ae?lang=en-us

The Mohammed Bin Rashid School of Government, is a research and teaching institution located in Dubai, United Arab Emirates. Original founded in 2005 as the Dubai School of Government, public policy in the Arab world is the focus of the institute. Sheikh Mohammed bin Rashid Al Maktoum, Vice President and Prime Minister of the United Arab Emirates, and Ruler of Dubai, is responsible for the academy's creation. Yassar Jarrar was the founding executive.

== Academic programs ==
In December 16, 2009, the school graduated its first cohort of 32 students in an intensive, one-year Master of Public Administration program. Designed for mid-level public sector professionals, the MPA program trains students in the theory and techniques of public sector management, and to help them better understand the political and social context in which public policies are designed and implemented and public services are provided. The MPA was conducted "in coordination with" Harvard Kennedy School’s Faculty Advisory Committee, although there was little contact between the two schools and the formal affiliation ended in 2011. The MPA degree is awarded by DSG, not by Harvard University.

DSG offers an Executive Diploma in Public Administration (EDPA) in partnership with the Lee Kuan Yew School of Public Policy at the National University of Singapore.

All DSG academic programs are accredited by the UAE Ministry of Higher Education and Scientific Research.

=== Executive education ===
The school conducts customized and open executive education programs through its faculty and in affiliation with Harvard Kennedy School at Harvard University and the Lee Kuan Yew School of Public Policy at the National University of Singapore. Executive education clients have included organizations within the Dubai Government, as well as governments throughout the Arab world.

In May 2008, the school signed a Memorandum of Understanding to provide academic and training programs for Egyptian government officials. A similar agreement was reached in July 2008 with the Government of Syria, and discussions are ongoing with officials in other governments throughout the Arab world.

== Public affairs ==
The school provides a platform for public dialogue and knowledge exchange by convening conferences, lectures, seminars and policy forums. DSG's Distinguished Speakers Series has featured guests such as Lee Kuan Yew, Klaus Schwab, Lawrence Summers, John Chambers, David Ellwood, Joseph Nye, Francis Fukuyama, Suad Joseph, Kishore Mahbubani and Bob Graham.

The school hosts a Research Seminar Series, which brings together academics and researchers, serving as a focal point for the identification of research interests.

== The Dubai Initiative ==
The Dubai School of Government had an affiliation with Harvard Kennedy School at Harvard University, which ended by 2011. This joint partnership, known as the Dubai Initiative, included funding, coordinating and facilitating fellowships, internships, faculty and graduate research grants, working papers, multi-year research initiatives, conferences, symposia, public lectures, policy workshops, faculty workshops, case studies and customized executive education programs.
