= Ahmed bin Mohammed Al Maktoum =

Second Deputy Ruler of Dubai

- Sheikh

Deputy Ruler of Dubai
- Incumbent
- Assumed office 28 April 2023 Serving with Maktoum bin Mohammed Al Maktoum
- Monarch: Mohammed bin Rashid Al Maktoum
- Preceded by: Hamdan bin Mohammed Al Maktoum
- Born: 7 February 1987 (age 39); Dubai, United Arab Emirates
- Spouse: Madiyah bint Dalmook Al Maktoum (m. 2019)
- Issue: Hind bint Ahmed Al Maktoum; Maryam bint Ahmed Al Maktoum
Names
- Sheikh Ahmed bin Mohammed bin Rashid bin Saeed bin Maktoum bin Hasher bin Maktoum bin Butti bin Suhail Al Maktoum
- House: Al Maktoum
- Father: Mohammed bin Rashid Al Maktoum
- Mother: Hind bint Maktoum Al Maktoum

Sheikh Ahmed bin Mohammed bin Rashid Al Maktoum (Arabic: أحمد بن محمد بن راشد آل مكتوم; born 7 February 1987) is an Emirati royal and politician who serves as Second Deputy Ruler of Dubai, chairman of the Dubai Media Council, president of the UAE National Olympic Committee (NOC), and chairman of the Mohammed bin Rashid Al Maktoum Knowledge Foundation (MBRF).

He was named as second deputy ruler in 2023, alongside his brother Sheikh Maktoum under their father Mohammed bin Rashid Al Maktoum's reign, unofficially placing Ahmed as third-in-line to the succession, behind his brothers Hamdan and Maktoum.

== Early life ==
Sheikh Ahmed was born on 7 February 1987 in Dubai, United Arab Emirates. He is the fourth son, and fifth child, that Sheikh Mohammed bin Rashid Al Maktoum and his first wife Sheikha Hind bint Maktoum Al Maktoum, the First Lady of Dubai, had together.

== Career ==
=== Government roles ===
In June 2022, Sheikh Ahmed was appointed as the chairman of the Dubai Media Council, after its establishment.

On 28 April 2023, Sheikh Mohammad Bin Rashid Al Maktoum, Vice President and Prime Minister of the United Arab Emirates and Ruler of Dubai issued Decree No. 21 of 2023 appointing Sheikh Ahmed bin Mohammed Al Maktoum as Second Deputy Ruler of Dubai and his brother, Sheikh Maktoum bin Mohammed Al Maktoum, as First Deputy Ruler of Dubai.

On 7 August 2023, the Election Commission of the National Olympic Committee announced that Sheikh Ahmed had won the presidency of the UAE National Olympic Committee for the period until 2024.

Ahmed is also the chairman of the Mohammed bin Rashid Al Maktoum Knowledge Foundation (MBRF).

== Personal life ==
On 5 June 2019, Sheikh Ahmed married Sheikha Madiyah bint Dalmook Al Maktoum in a ceremony that saw two of his brothers, Sheikh Hamdan and Sheikh Maktoum, also getting married the same day. They have two daughters:

- Sheikha Hind bint Ahmed bin Mohammed Al Maktoum (born 22 October 2022).
- Sheikha Maryam bint Ahmed bin Mohammed Al Maktoum (born 6 May 2026).
