= Rashid bin Mohammed Al Maktoum =

Sheikh of the Emirate of Dubai (1981–2015)

- Sheikh
- Born: 12 November 1981; Dubai, United Arab Emirates
- Died: 19 September 2015 (aged 33); Dubai, United Arab Emirates
- Burial: Bur Dubai's Umm Hurair cemetery
Names
- Sheikh Rashid bin Mohammed bin Rashid bin Saeed bin Maktoum bin Hasher bin Maktoum bin Butti bin Suhail Al Maktoum
- House: Al Maktoum
- Father: Mohammed bin Rashid Al Maktoum
- Mother: Hind bint Maktoum Al Maktoum

Sheikh Rashid bin Mohammed bin Rashid Al Maktoum (Arabic: راشد بن محمد بن راشد آل مكتوم; 12 November 1981 – 19 September 2015) was the eldest son of Vice President, Prime Minister of the United Arab Emirates and Ruler of Dubai Sheikh Mohammed bin Rashid Al Maktoum and his wife Sheikha Hind bint Maktoum bin Juma Al Maktoum. He died at age 33 of a heart attack.

== Biography ==
Rashid was one of Mohammed bin Rashid Al Maktoum's many children. He was born on 12 November 1981. Rashid was educated in Dubai at the Rashid School for Boys. He then attended Sandhurst Military Academy in the United Kingdom and graduated in 2002.

Rashid was the Crown Prince of Dubai until his younger brother Hamdan was appointed crown prince in 2008.

Rashid was a principal partner or owner in the following listed companies:

- Noor Investment Group, Principal Partner
- Noor Bank, Principal Partner
- United Holdings Group Dubai, Owner
- Zabeel Racing International, Owner
- Dubai Holding Company, Principal Partner

== Sport ==
Rashid was a well-known sports figure in the UAE. He participated in a number of International and local Equestrian Endurance competitions winning a number of laurels. His greatest achievement was winning two gold medals in the 2006 Asian Games 120 km Endurance individual mixed as well as 120 km Endurance Team Mixed events. He owned Zabeel Racing, the Dubai stables where his horses were trained. Rashid led the individual owners list an unprecedented five times with over 428 wins. He was also a football fan; his favourite club was Manchester United.

In January 2006 Rashid was appointed president of the UAE Olympic Committee but he later resigned from his position. He also served as president of Dubai Cultural and Sports Club.

== Death ==
Rashid died of a heart attack on the morning of 19 September 2015 at the age of 33.

A three-day mourning period was declared in Dubai upon his death, and the United Arab Emirates flags were flown at half mast. Funeral prayers were held at Zabeel Mosque. His burial took place on the same day in Bur Dubai's Umm Hurair cemetery.
