= Hamdan bin Mohammed Al Maktoum =

Crown Prince of Dubai (born 1982)

Hamdan bin Mohammed Al Maktoum حمدان بن محمد آل مكتوم
- Sheikh
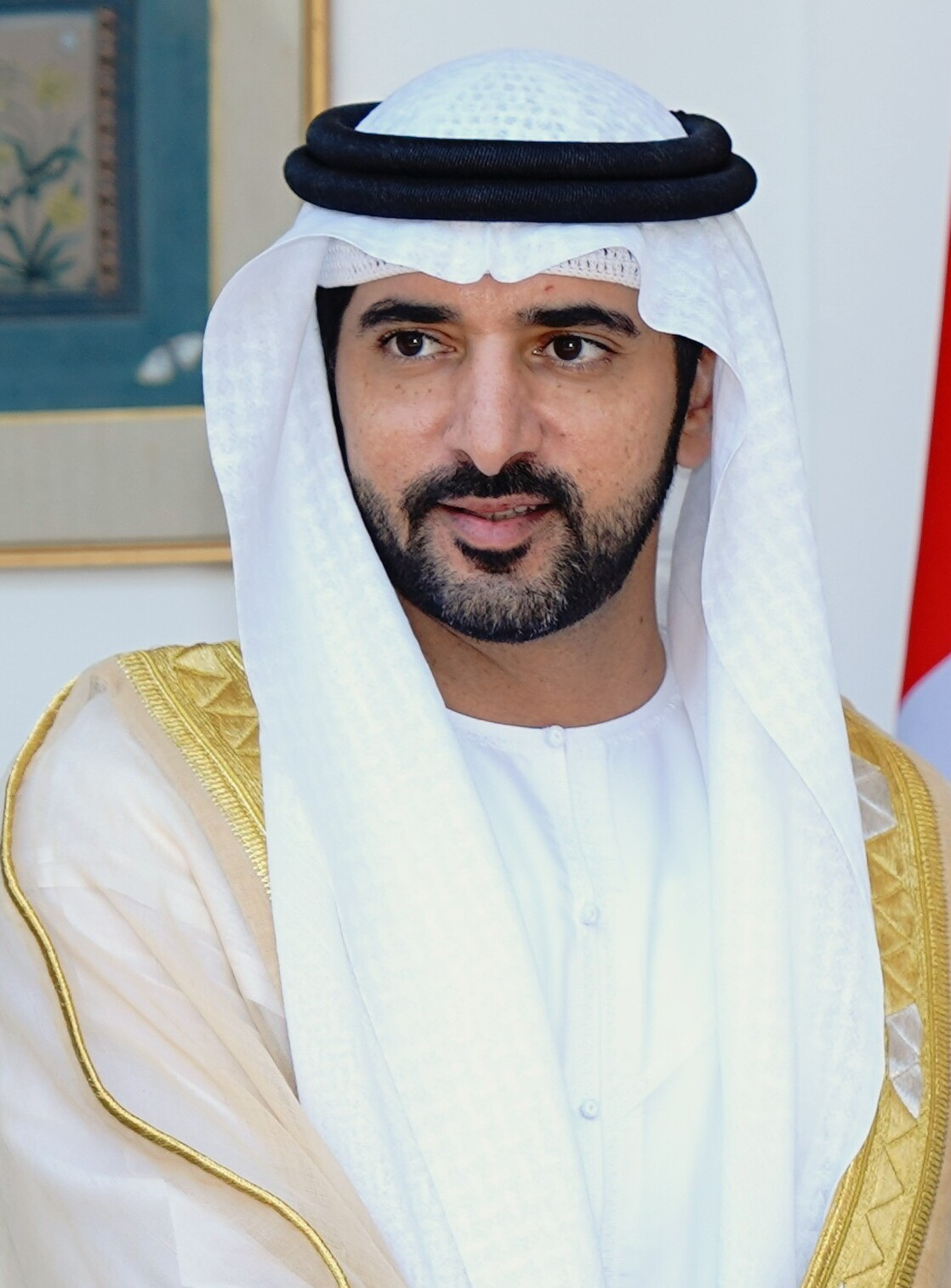
- Sheikh Hamdan in 2025

Deputy Prime Minister of the United Arab Emirates
- Incumbent
- Assumed office 14 July 2024 Serving with 4 other people
- President: Mohamed bin Zayed Al Nahyan
- Prime Minister: Mohammed bin Rashid Al Maktoum

Minister of Defence
- Incumbent
- Assumed office 14 July 2024
- President: Mohamed bin Zayed Al Nahyan
- Preceded by: Mohammed bin Rashid Al Maktoum

Crown Prince of Dubai
- Incumbent
- Assumed office 1 February 2008
- Monarch: Mohammed bin Rashid Al Maktoum
- Preceded by: Rashid bin Mohammed Al Maktoum

Deputy Ruler of Dubai
- In office 4 January 2006 – 1 February 2008 Serving with Hamdan bin Rashid Al Maktoum
- Monarch: Mohammed bin Rashid Al Maktoum
- Preceded by: Maktoum bin Rashid Al Maktoum
- Succeeded by: Maktoum bin Mohammed Al Maktoum
- Born: 14 November 1982 (age 44); Dubai, United Arab Emirates
- Spouse: Shaikha bint Saeed bin Thani Al Maktoum (m. 2019)
- Issue: Rashid; Shaikha; Mohammed; Hind
Names
- Sheikh Hamdan bin Mohammed bin Rashid bin Saeed bin Maktoum bin Hasher bin Maktoum bin Butti bin Suhail Al Maktoum
- House: Al Maktoum
- Father: Mohammed bin Rashid Al Maktoum
- Mother: Hind bint Maktoum Al Maktoum
- Education: Royal Military Academy Sandhurst; London School of Economics
- Sports career
Medal record
Representing United Arab Emirates
Equestrian
World Equestrian Games
Gold medal – first place	2010 Kentucky	Team endurance
Gold medal – first place	2014 Normandy	Individual endurance
Bronze medal – third place	2010 Kentucky	Individual endurance

Sheikh Hamdan bin Mohammed bin Rashid Al Maktoum (Arabic: حمدان بن محمد بن راشد آل مكتوم, romanized: Ḥamdān bin Muḥammad bin Rāšid Āl Maktūm; born 14 November 1982) is an Emirati royal and politician who has been the Crown Prince of Dubai since 2008. He is the Minister of Defence of the UAE since 14 July 2024. He served as deputy ruler of Dubai from 2006 to 2008. He is popularly known as Fazza (Arabic: فزاع), the name under which he publishes his poetry, which means "the one who helps" in Arabic. As an equestrian, Maktoum is a multiple world champion at the World Equestrian Games, though has previously been temporarily banned for riding a doped horse.

== Early life and education ==
Hamdan bin Mohammed is the son of Sheikh Mohammed bin Rashid Al Maktoum and Sheikha Hind bint Maktoum bin Juma Al Maktoum, the senior wife of Mohammed. He is the second male child of their twelve children and he is the third son of his father. Hamdan's elder full brother was Sheikh Rashid bin Mohammed.

Hamdan bin Mohammed was educated in Dubai at the Rashid School For Boys and then at the Dubai School of Government. He continued his studies in the United Kingdom, where he graduated from Sandhurst in 2001; he later attended the London School of Economics.

== Positions and roles ==
Hamdan bin Mohammed was appointed as the Chairman of the Dubai Executive Council in September 2006. On 1 February 2008, he was appointed Crown Prince of Dubai, while his brother Sheikh Maktoum bin Mohammed Al Maktoum acceded to Deputy Ruler of Dubai. As the new hereditary prince, Hamdan appointed new key personnel and financial advisors, while Hamdan himself became head of HN Capital LLP. He is the head of the Sheikh Mohammed bin Rashid Establishment for young entrepreneurs; he sits on the Dubai sports council and the Dubai autism centre.

He was part of the Dubai World Expo 2020 delegation when the emirate was awarded the right to host the event. He went to the top floor of the Burj Khalifa to wave the UAE flag a few days after the World Expo 2020 win. He is the founder of the Hamdan International Photography Award, which was launched in 2011.

In June 2022, Sheikh Hamdan launched the "Dubai Global" initiative, which was meant to establish 50 commercial representative offices for Dubai on five continents. The initiative supported Dubai-based firms and strengthened the city's position as a business hub.

Sheikh Hamdan was appointed Deputy Prime Minister of the UAE on 14 July 2024. He was also appointed as Minister of Defence of the United Arab Emirates on 14 July 2024, succeeding his father Mohammed bin Rashid Al Maktoum who held this designation since the formation of the UAE in 1971.

== Equestrian ==
He rides for Godolphin Stables and has attended Royal Ascot.

Sheikh Hamdan won a gold medal at the Alltech FEI World Equestrian Games™ 2014 in Normandy (FRA), team gold in 2012, and a bronze medal in 2010. He led a team of five UAE riders at the Championships in Samorín on 17 September 2016.

In 2009, he was banned for 10 months from competition after it was found one of his horses was competing while on a steroid. In 2013, evidence shared from The Daily Telegraph showed Sheikh Hamdan was riding a horse under a false name during the 2012 World Championships at Euston Park.

== Personal life and interests ==
The Crown Prince's Instagram account has more than 17 million followers, as of April 2025. He posts pictures that showcase his hobbies, which include animals, poetry, sports, photography, and adventures.

Hamdan Al Maktoum is an equestrian, skydiver and scuba diver. He dives in Fujairah. He is known for his romantic and patriotic poems in Arabic. He publishes his poems under the pen name of Fazza (فزاع).

On 15 May 2019, Sheikh Hamdan married his cousin Sheikha Shaikha bint Saeed bin Thani Al Maktoum, on the same day that his brothers Maktoum and Ahmed also married. On 6 June 2019, he and his brothers celebrated the royal wedding together at the Dubai World Trade Center. On 21 May 2021, it was announced that Sheikh Hamdan had welcomed twins, a son named Rashid and a daughter named Shaikha. On 25 February 2023, Sheikh Hamdan welcomed another son, named Mohammed. On 22 March 2025, he welcomed his second daughter, Hind.

== Honours ==
- Knight Cross of the Order of Civil Merit (Kingdom of Spain, 23 May 2008)
