= Aisha al-Qahtani =

Qatari women's rights activist

- Born: Qatar
- Education: Philosophy and English literature
- Occupation: Women's rights activist
- Movement: Women's rights

Aisha al-Qahtani is a Qatari women's rights activist who was granted asylum in the United Kingdom. She rose to prominence when she shared her story of how she escaped Qatar during a family holiday to Kuwait in 2019.

== Early life ==
Al-Qahtani was born into an influential military family in Qatar. She was the youngest daughter of a high-ranking military official and the niece of an ambassador. As a child, she claims she got into trouble with her family for reading and listening to Western novels and music. al-Qahtani also stated that, because of her "disobedience", she was often beaten by her family and that her bedroom windows were barred. She also recalled that after she had cut her hair, a vase was smashed over her head by a family member. Her family had also arranged for her to marry a fundamentalist religious cleric.

She is a philosophy and English literature graduate.

== Escape to the United Kingdom ==
Due to Qatari law, al-Qahtani was unable to leave the country without permission from a male relative, as she was under 25. After learning of the escape of Princesses Latifa and Shamsa bint Mohammed Al Maktoum, she was inspired to flee Qatar, and spent several years planning an escape. One night during a family holiday to Kuwait in 2019, she evaded her brother and left the hotel in a taxi. From there, she boarded a 3am flight to London. In a later interview with 60 Minutes Australia, she claimed that if she had been caught fleeing Kuwait by her family she would've been killed. One day after landing in the United Kingdom, she alleged that was informed by police that one of her male relatives had been prevented from entering the country at Heathrow Airport.

al-Qahtani claims that due to threats from her family, she's had to frequently relocate throughout the United Kingdom after they allegedly bribed government officials for her location. She also stated that the Qatari government had been in contact with her and promised her safety if she returned.

In interviews, al-Qahtani has stated that she feels it is her responsibility to advocate for Qatari women after she fled and emphasised the importance of informing people about what is happening to them in Qatar. She has said that she dreams of inspiring a revolution there for women's rights, and that she holds the government responsible for allowing male family members to exert control over women's lives.

== See also ==
- Women in Qatar
- Latifa bint Mohammed Al Maktoum
- Shamsa bint Mohammed Al Maktoum
- Human rights in Qatar
