= Radha Stirling =

Human rights advocate

- Born: November 1978 (age 47–48); Florida, USA
- Education: Bond University
- Occupation: Human rights advocate
- Website: radhastirling.com

Radha Stirling (born 1978) is the founder of the UK-based organizations Detained in Dubai, Due Process International, and IPEX Reform. Her work focuses on judicial systems and extradition laws in the Middle East.

In 2008, Stirling founded Detained in Dubai, a justice organisation, after her friend, Cat Le-Huy, had been imprisoned in Dubai. Stirling campaigned for his release; subsequently, she received requests from other people in need of help. Stirling subsequently founded Detained in Dubai to provide legal and advocacy assistance to individuals detained in the United Arab Emirates.

Stirling also campaigns for changes to the legal system of the United Arab Emirates (UAE) and founded Due Process International to campaign for reforms in the wider Middle East. Stirling lobbied the Australian Parliament regarding human rights provisions in its extradition treaty with the UAE.

In March 2018, Stirling acted for Hervé Jaubert and Sheikha Latifa Bin Rashid Al Maktoum, after she made allegations of abuse and torture against her father, Mohammed bin Rashid Al Maktoum, the ruler of Dubai. Indian and UAE soldiers captured the two as they were in the Arabian Sea, near the coast of India.

== Early life ==
Stirling attended Mater Christi College, in Belgrave, Victoria; Yarra Valley Grammar; Box Hill TAFE and Bond University.

== Career ==
Stirling became active in the Middle East when Cat Le-Huy, a friend, was detained in Dubai. She led a campaign for his release in 2008, founding Detained in Dubai.

Stirling founded a campaign group, IPEX Reform, where she focuses on cases involving extradition and Interpol red notices. Stirling has provided expert witness testimony in UAE and Qatar extradition cases.

in 2017, Stirling and barrister Ben Cooper of Doughty Street Chambers urged the British Irish Commercial Bar Association (BICBA) to cancel an upcoming conference with the Dubai International Arbitration Centre (DIAC) following allegations of corruption and malpractice. BICBA later cancelled their event.

In 2023, Stirling was hired by Joe Biden's sexual assault accuser, Tara Reade.

=== Lobbying ===
Stirling has engaged with various political figures on behalf of her clients. In 2010, Senator Kroger and Stirling successfully lobbied Australian parliament to install human rights safety provisions into the newly passed extradition treaty between Australia and the UAE.

Stirling has worked with a number of British politicians including Priti Patel who advocated for Asa Hutchinson to be freed by the UAE, Kenny MacAskill for Conor Howard, Emma Lewell-Buck who raised the case of Robert Urwin in Parliament, Crispin Blunt who supported Christopher Emms and Canadian MP Richard Martel and Parliamentary Secretary to the Foreign Affairs Minister Pamela Goldsmith-Jones to successfully resolve 86 criminal cases against André Gauthier in the Gold AE scandal. Prime Minister Justin Trudeau responded to calls by Martel, before his release from jail in Dubai. Stirling has worked with Lord Timothy Clement-Jones, Baroness Janet Whitaker and Andy Slaughter, MP to call on the Foreign Office to increase their travel warnings and even sanction the UAE over the abuse of Brits in detention. In 2022, she worked with Douglas Chapman, MP to secure the freedom of Scotsman Brian Glendinning.

=== Interpol and extradition reform ===
Stirling founded IPEX Reform, an NGO campaigning for reform of extradition laws and the red notice system.

Stirling has stated that the Interpol red notice system is subject to misuse by various governments, including the United States and the UAE.

=== Criticism of the British Foreign Office ===
Stirling has called for increased travel warnings, saying "no-one would really be aware" of the severity of cyber-crime laws in the UAE, and the "FCO had failed to adequately warn tourists about them." Over Billy Hood's detention, she said "These are not isolated incidents but repeat patterns and this is why Baroness Whitaker, Andy Slaughter and other MP's have called on the foreign office to increase their travel warnings and even sanction the UAE over the abuse of Brits in detention."

Stirling accused the Foreign Commonwealth and Development Office of "working too strongly in cooperation with the UAE Government". She criticised the FCO for providing advice to British travellers which "really falls short of the reality of the situation". Stirling also worked with Billy Barclay, who said "that the embassy was advising the family against campaigning for his release. "In fact, it was only as a result of the campaign...that he is home today."

=== Media appearances ===
Stirling has appeared in a number of documentaries and TV shows. She has appeared on Good Morning Britain, 60 Minutes, ITV's DayBreak, BBC's The Missing Princess, an Aljazeera documentary with Tamer Almisshal, and the Sean Hannity show.

=== Journalism ===
She hosts her own blog and has contributed to the Jerusalem Report, the Times of Israel, the Independent and Inside Arabia.

=== Ras Al Khaimah and hacking ===
Stirling's work includes criticism of the administration of Ras Al Khaimah (RAK) and its ruler, Sheikh Saud bin Saqr Al Qasimi.

A Citizen Lab and Facebook investigation found her clients were targeted by Israeli spy company, Bluehawk CI. Stirling suggested America should hold foreign states and corporations to account.

In a separate incident, The Daily Beast reported on an attempt to install malware on Stirling's phone by individuals seeking information regarding her litigation against Ras Al Khaimah. The hackers were seeking information on her RAK clients and litigations she was involved with as well as the Jordanian Princess Haya. They then tried to send her malware to surveil her phone

=== Alcohol in the UAE ===
In August 2018, Stirling stated that "the UAE maintains a deliberately misleading facade that alcohol consumption is perfectly legal for visitors" after Swedish-Iranian national Ellie Holman, whom she assisted, was reportedly arrested for drinking one complimentary glass of wine aboard an Emirates flight from London to Dubai. She said "They will offer you alcohol on their airline, and arrest you at the airport for accepting it. This can only be regarded as such a deliberate attempt to misrepresent UAE rules on alcohol that it amounts to entrapment."
