= Detained in Dubai =

London-based organisation

Detained in Dubai is a London-based organisation founded in 2008 by Radha Stirling, which states its aim is to help foreigners abroad.

Detained in Dubai was founded when Cat Le-Huy, a colleague of Stirling's from Endemol, was arrested in the UAE. Stirling led the legal team and media that ended with Le-Huy's release. Following the international press coverage of the case, Stirling was asked by others for assistance.

== Cases and causes ==
Detained in Dubai has represented businesspeople and celebrities including Andy Neal, Jamie Harron, Billy Barclay, Ellie Holman, Conor Howard, Billy Hood, Sheikha Zeynab and Brian Glendinning.

=== Princess Latifa ===
In March 2018, Detained in Dubai responded to requests for help from Latifa bint Mohammed al-Maktoum, a princess and daughter of the prime minister of the United Arab Emirates (UAE) who was abducted by masked armed men off a boat near Goa on 4 March 2018. As of 5 May 2018, Latifa's location was unknown, but in December 2018, the “troubled girl” was reported to be in the care of her family by Mary Robinson, former United Nations High Commissioner for Human Rights, after a meeting with Latifa's step-mother Princess Haya. Robinson was publicly criticised by Detained in Dubai and Human Rights Watch; in February 2021, Robinson retracted her statement, claiming she and Haya had been misled by the Dubai royal family.

In April 2019, Detained in Dubai attracted media attention to the case of Laleh Shahravesh, a British citizen who was arrested in Dubai for having called her ex-husband an "idiot" and her ex-husband's new wife a "horse" in a Facebook post. According to Detained in Dubai, Shahravesh had risked a two-year prison sentence and a £50,000 fine for her "horseplay".

=== Tori Towey ===
In July 2024, Detained in Dubai was reported to be providing legal assistance to Tori Towey, an Irish citizen and former flight attendant for the airline Emirates being held captive within UAE borders; Irish and British media organizations began reporting on the situation on July 9. Ms. Towey had moved to Dubai in 2023 for work and had married an unnamed South African man while there. The husband reportedly became violently possessive and physically abusive soon after the marriage, resulting in a number of hospital visits for the victim and eventually driving Towey to try and commit suicide.

Following the suicide attempt, Towey was arrested by the Dubai authorities and taken into police custody where she was charged with attempted suicide and alcohol consumption. Towey had also been informed previously that a travel ban had been imposed on her by the UAE authorities, preventing her from leaving the country; her husband is alleged to have ripped up her passport. Towey's mother travelled to Dubai to support her daughter and advocate for her release.

Radha Stirling has said she spoke to Ms Towey on the morning of July 10. Taoiseach Simon Harris, Tánaiste Micheál Martin and Irish Ambassador to the UAE Alison Milton have also been in contact with Towey, with Harris stating "I had a conversation with the Tánaiste who is working on this matter as Minister of Foreign Affairs. I’ve spoken to our ambassador in the region as well and have been in constant contact with her on this matter since yesterday" In a statement on their website, Detained in Dubai said “We are calling on Dubai authorities to urgently drop the charges against Tori, remove the travel ban and let her fly home to Ireland with her mother."

On July 10, Taoiseach Harris announced in Dáil Éireann that Towey's travel ban had been lifted and that the Irish Embassy in Dubai had made arrangements to escort Towey to the airport and fly her home to Co. Roscommon as soon as she was ready to do so.

== Partnerships and Cases ==
Detained in Dubai gained steam when they made controversial partnerships

=== Shahid Bolsen ===
Irish-German American activist, writer, and public figure Shahid King Bolsen became involved with the company after "Detained In Dubai" took up his case in 2012. Bolsen admitted to killing a German engineer he lured into his apartment online, under false pretenses of sex in 2006. Bolsen has been accused of inciting violence against Americans and American businesses in Egypt as recently as 2015, which he denied in an interview with Stirling.

According to The New York Times, Bolsen is quoted as saying "The idea is disruption without bloodshed, I condemn the loss of life and the use of violence against people". But, he added, if a few lives are lost to help prevent needless deaths at the hands of security forces, "sometimes it is a price to be paid." Bolsen claims that the question was focused on property damage not loss of life.

=== Other Partners ===
Ellie Holman

In August 2018, Swedish-Iranian Ellie Holman was charged with having alcohol in her blood after drinking one complimentary glass of wine on an Emirates flight prior to her arrival in Dubai. Radha Stirling alleged that "the UAE maintains a deliberately misleading facade that alcohol consumption is perfectly legal for visitors." According to Detained in Dubai, the UAE presented that she had been detained for visa-related issues, though the official prosecution charge provided that she had been arrested for the consumption of alcohol and invading the privacy of an officer. Detained in Dubai has campaigned for legislative reforms to prevent further such arrests.

In response, Emirates released a statement clarifying that alcohol consumption is not prohibited on their flights and alcohol is served in the lounges in the Dubai International Airport and is available for purchase in the duty-free area of the airport. A statement from attorney General of Dubai was released detailing that Holman attempted to enter Dubai using an expired Swedish passport and was held for less than 24 hours and then deported due to profanity and photographing a government official in a restricted area. Holman later stated that she had been held due to a "visa mistake". The original story was criticized by Dubai for being "fake news."

Joseph and Joshua Lopez

In June 2024, two Ohio brothers, Joseph and Joshua Lopez, were sentenced to four months in a Dubai prison over charges of alcohol consumption, assaulting a police officer, damaging a patrol vehicle and resisting arrest. One of the brothers, Joseph is an Air Force veteran, who is currently “Mister Louisiana” in the Mister USA competition. On 25 May 2024, the brothers visited Dubai to generate content. “Detained in Dubai” stated that the brothers were drugged at yacht party by local resident. On 2 June, they were taken to two separate “after parties”, where they were drugged through a drink and were forced to make large bill payment. Their request for blood request was ignored by the authorities. Detained in Dubai described the jail as "among the world's most notorious." Radha Sterling said the Ohio brothers were clearly “targeted by scammers who were wanting to rob them”. She also condemned the UAE for its treatment of tourist, stating that it is not safe and crime-free as it portrays. The Lorenzo brothers were seeking help from the US lawmakers, including Republican Ohio Sen. JD Vance, who was in talks with the UAE Embassy in the US and the State Department.

Charles Wimberly (US Navy Veteran)

On 21 September 2024, a US navy veteran, Charles Wimberly travelled from Georgia to Dubai. Wimberly suffered from PTSD and back injury, and was therefore carrying prescription CBD oil and Ibuprofen. On 27 September 2024, he was detained from Dubai International Airport over acquisition of “trafficking” his own prescribed medication. He was facing 3+ years in Dubai jail. Radha Stirling said the situation is “every tourist’s nightmare”. Wimberly was later released on bail, but was not allowed to leave Dubai.

== See also ==
- Prisoners Abroad, UK charity supporting British persons imprisoned abroad
