= Alia Toukan =

Queen of Jordan from 1972 to 1977

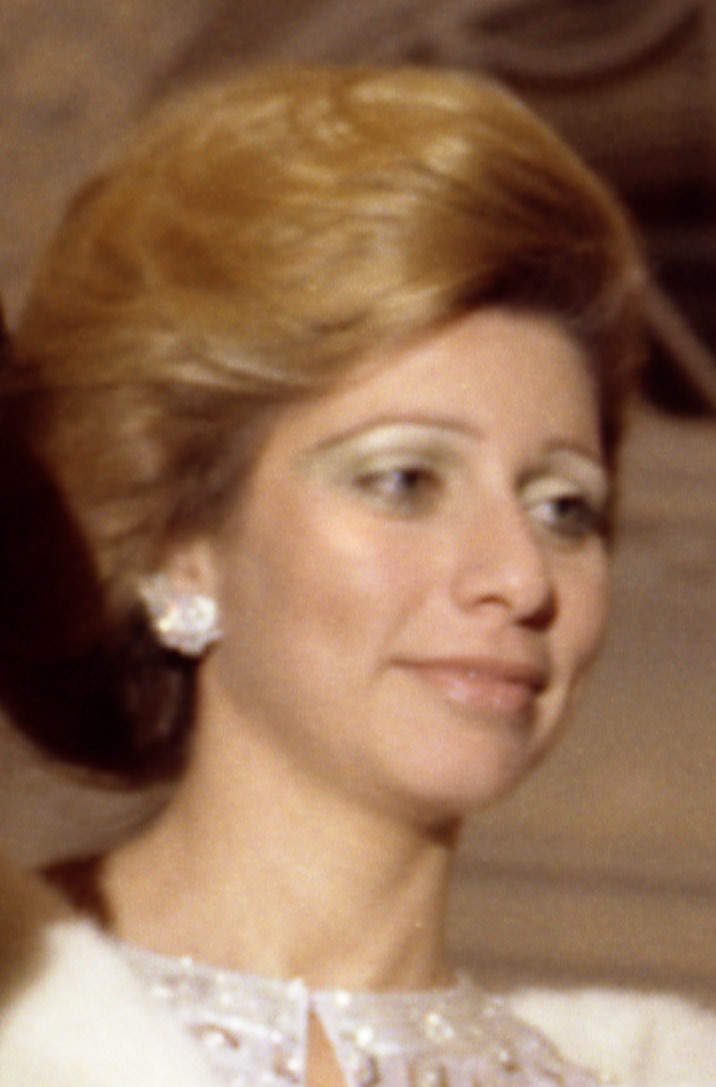
- Alia in 1976

Queen consort of Jordan
- Tenure: 24 December 1972 – 9 February 1977
- Born: Alia Bahauddin Toukan; 25 December 1948; Cairo, Kingdom of Egypt
- Died: 9 February 1977 (aged 28); Amman, Jordan
- Burial: Raghadan Palace
- Spouse: Hussein of Jordan (m. 1972)
- Issue: Princess Haya; Prince Ali; Abir Muhaisen (adopted)
- Father: Baha ud-din Toukan
- Mother: Hanan Hashim

Alia Baha ud-din Toukan (Arabic: علياء بهاء الدين طوقان, romanized: 'Āliyā' Bahāʾ ud-Dīn Ṭūqān; 25 December 1948 – 9 February 1977), also known as Alia Al Hussein (Arabic: علياء الحسين), was Queen of Jordan as the third wife of King Hussein from their marriage on 24 December 1972 until her death in a helicopter crash in 1977.

== Background ==
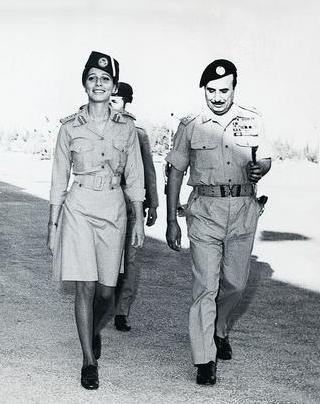
Queen Alia walking alongside Jordanian Army Chief of Staff Habis Majali.

Alia Toukan was born on 25 December 1948 in Cairo, Egypt, the daughter of Baha Toukan and his wife Hanan Hashim. Her mother, a homemaker, was a grandniece of Ibrahim Hashim Pasha, and her father was a diplomat. At the time of Alia's birth, he was the ambassador of Jordan to the Court of St James' (United Kingdom), Italy, Turkey and Egypt all at once. Toukan, a close confidant of King Abdullah I of Jordan, had previously helped write the Jordanian Constitution in 1952, and had served as Jordan's first Ambassador to the United Nations.

Alia spent most of her childhood traveling with her parents during her father's career in Jordan's diplomatic corps: she lived in Egypt, Turkey, London, the United States, and Rome. She attended Church School in London with her younger brothers, Alaa and Abdullah. She was educated at the Rome Center of Liberal Arts of Loyola University Chicago. She studied political science with a minor in social psychology, and public relations at Hunter College in New York City. She was interested in sports and writing, and she wished to be a diplomat. In 1971, she moved to Jordan, where she worked for Royal Jordanian Airlines. She was asked by King Hussein, grandson of Abdullah I, to oversee the preparations for the first International Water Skiing Festival held in the coastal city of Aqaba in September 1972.

== Family ==
Alia married the King in a private ceremony at her father's house, with no attendance of any other royal family members, on 24 December 1972, 3 days after the king divorced his second wife Princess Muna Al-Hussein, and was titled Queen Alia Al Hussein (Arabic: الملكة علياء الحسين).

They had two children:

- Princess Haya (born 3 May 1974)
- Prince Ali (born 23 December 1975)

They also adopted Abir, a young Palestinian girl whose mother had been killed by a plane crash at a refugee camp near the Amman airport.

== Queen ==
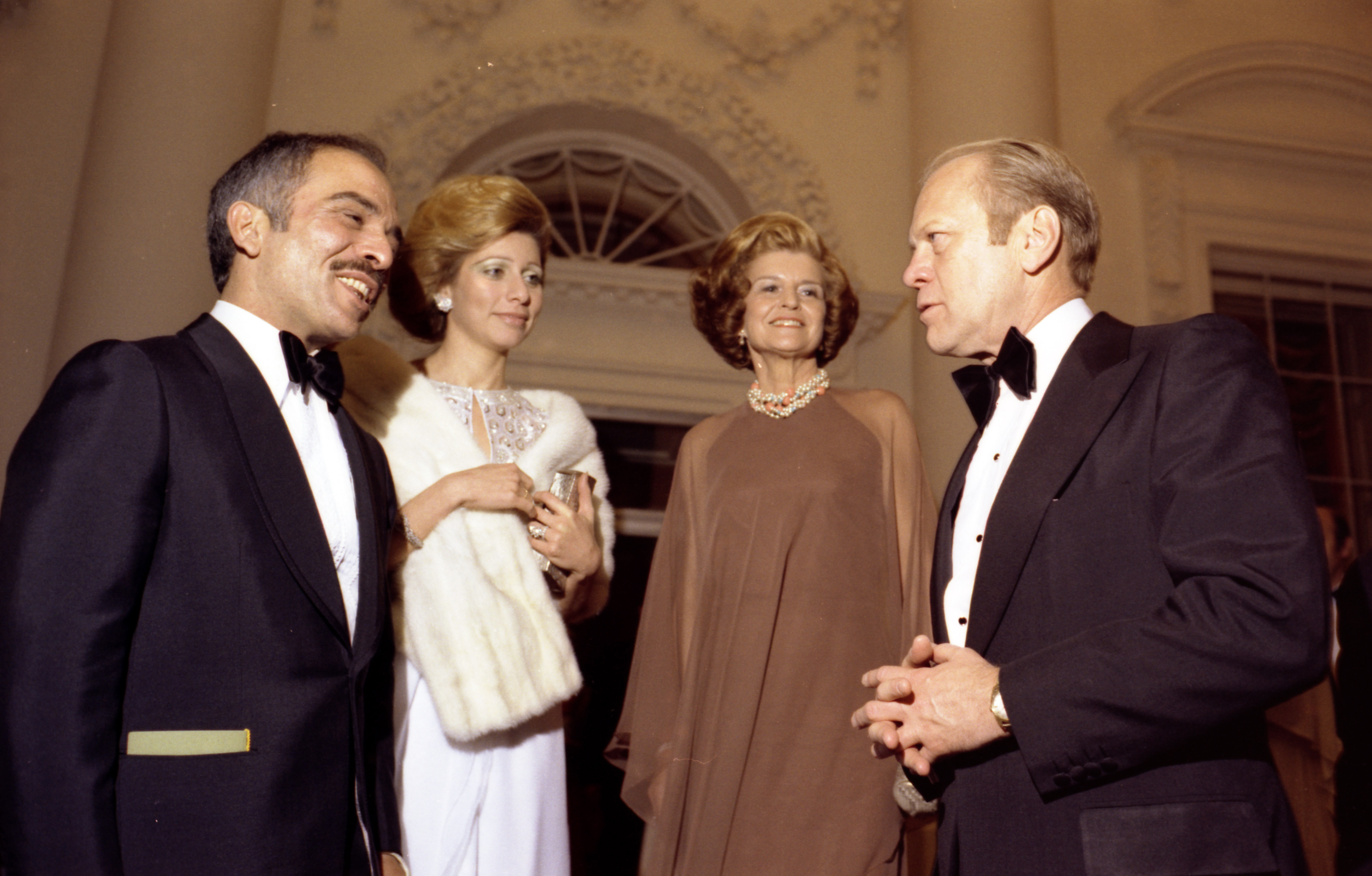
Queen Alia (left) with her husband following state dinner with Betty and Gerald Ford on 30 March 1976.

Queen Alia founded the Office of the Queen of Jordan and gave it an active and public role. The active role she took in Jordan has been emulated by her successors. She financed social development projects, placing particular emphasis on women and children. She often made surprise visits to hospitals and national institutions, aiming to raise service standards and help people to help themselves. In her drive to ensure that children from impoverished backgrounds received their right to education, she fostered close ties with schools such as the Schneller School for Orphans, which took many of the street children that Queen Alia sent there.

Her commitment to improving social services continued throughout her lifetime and was still pursued in her name after her death, when King Hussein ensured the continuation of the many educational scholarships given in her honour.

Alia's love of the arts and literature inspired the establishment of libraries throughout the country, including one at the Central Bank of Jordan and another in the King Hussein Medical City. Her interest in the arts led to the founding of the Haya Cultural Centre for Children, the National Folklore Troupe and the Alia Art Gallery. It was also instrumental in conceiving the Jerash Festival for the Arts.

In 1974, Alia called for women to be granted the right to vote and be elected for parliament. On 4 April 1974, a law was promulgated granting women this right; however, the suspension of parliamentary life in Jordan between 1974 and 1989 prevented its implementation.

== Death and legacy ==
Alia died in a military helicopter crash in Amman, Jordan, on 9 February 1977. She was on her way back from an inspection trip to Tafileh Hospital in southern Jordan. King Hussein announced her death on radio, stating that the crash had happened in a violent rainstorm. The Minister of Health Mohammed al-Beshir and Lieutenant Colonel Dr. Mohannad Alkhas Hatough were also killed in the crash. Her funeral ceremony took place on the following day, in which members of the Jordanian Armed Forces took part. Among the foreign dignitaries at the funeral was the Syrian president Hafez al-Assad.

Amman's principal airport, Queen Alia International Airport (AMM), was built in 1983 and named in her honour. It is located 32 km (20 miles) south of the city and replaced Amman Marka International Airport (now Amman Civil Airport) as the city's main gateway.

== Honours and decorations ==
National

- Dame Grand Cordon with Collar of the Order of al-Hussein bin Ali.
- Dame Grand Cordon of the Supreme Order of the Renaissance [special class] (24 December 1972).

Foreign

- Member of the Order of Gabriela Silang (Republic of the Philippines, 1 March 1976).
- Dame Grand Cordon of the Order of the Precious Crown (Empire of Japan, 3 March 1976).
- Great Star of Honour for Services to the Republic of Austria (Republic of Austria, 15 June 1976).

== Institutions named after or associated with Queen Alia ==
- Queen Alia International Airport
- Queen Alia Military Hospital
- Securing Political Constitutional Rights for Women
- The SOS Children's Village
- The Queen Alia Foundation for Hearing and Speech
- The Farah Rehabilitation Unit at the King Hussein Medical Center
- The Queen Alia Heart Institute, also at the King Hussein Medical Center
- Tkiyet Um Ali Queen Alia (Um Ali – The Mother of Ali)

Royal titles
Vacant Title last held by Muna Al-Hussein as princess consort	Queen consort of Jordan; 24 December 1972 – 9 February 1977	Vacant Title next held by Noor Al-Hussein
