= ICGS Samarth =

Indian coast guard vessel

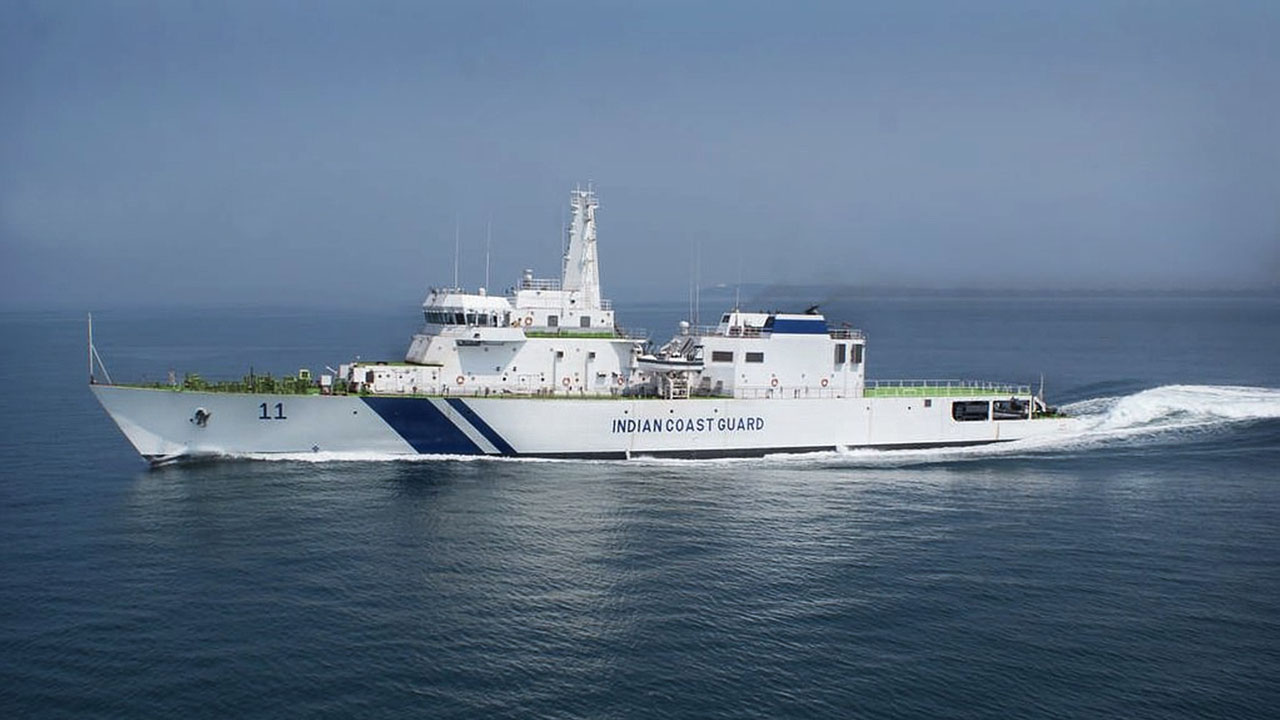
- ICGS Samarth patrolling in the Arabian Sea

History

India
- Name: Samarth
- Namesake: 'Capable'
- Owner: Indian Coast Guard
- Builder: Goa Shipyard Limited
- Acquired: 30 October 2015
- Commissioned: 10 November 2015
- Status: in active service

General characteristics
- Class & type: Samarth-class offshore patrol vessel
- Displacement: 2,450 tonnes (2,700 short tons)
- Length: 105 m (344 ft)
- Propulsion: 2 X diesel engines 9,100 kW (12,200 hp) each
- Speed: In excess of 23 kn (43 km/h; 26 mph)
- Endurance: 6,000 nmi (11,000 km)
- Complement: 98(14 Officers)
- Aircraft carried: 1x helicopter: HAL Dhruv

ICGS Samarth is the Indian Coast Guard's latest and largest Offshore Patrol Vessel (OPV). Samarth is first in the series of six 105m offshore patrol vessels and has been built by Goa Shipyard Limited. The vessel was commissioned to Coast Guard service on 10 November 2015 by Defence Minister Manohar Parrikar. Samarth is based in Goa is extensively used for patrolling along the Exclusive Economic Zone and other duties, as it is set to be extensively used along the Western Seaboard. The vessel will be under the command of a Deputy Inspector-General.

== Service history ==
In 2018 ICGS Samarth and Shoor, along with Indian Navy vessels, took part in an operation to seize UAE princess Latifa bint Mohammed Al Maktoum with controversy as to whether this was a hostage rescue or, in cooperation with the UAE, an attempt to thwart the princess' escape from the UAE.

On 27 February 2024, Samarth and Abhinav arrived at the Port of Galle, situated in Galle, Sri Lanka, as part of a formal visit. Following the completion of the official engagement, the coast guard vessels departed the port on 1 March 2024 and sailed to the Port of Colombo.

== See also ==
- ICGS Samrat
