= Oldfields School =

- Glencoe, Maryland 21152; USA

Information
- Type: Independent, Day, Boarding
- Motto: Fortezza, Umilitade, e Largo Core (Courage, Humility, and Largeness of Heart)
- Established: 1867
- Faculty: 32
- Grades: 8–12
- Gender: All-Girls
- Enrollment: 100
- Average class size: 8 students
- Campus size: 130 acres
- Colors: Green and White
- Mascot: Tiger and Dragon
- Website: oldfieldsschool.org

Oldfields School is a college preparatory school for girls in grades 8 to 12 in Sparks Glencoe, Maryland. As of 2016, Oldfields School had approximately 100 boarding and day students in grades 8 through 12, coming from 28 states and 15 countries.

In April 2023, Oldfields announced it would close at the end of the 2022–23 school year, setting up a partnership with Garrison Forest School to facilitate accepting its remaining students. After a lawsuit filed against the outgoing board, a fundraising drive and other support from the Oldfields community, the School reopened with new students for the 2024-2025 school year.

Its theater, also home to the Manor Mill Playhouse theatrical company, is named after the British actor David Niven.

== History ==
It was founded in Baltimore County, Maryland in 1867 by Anna Austen McCulloch, and the first girls' boarding school in Maryland.

Among the school's notable graduates was Wallis Warfield Simpson, who became the Duchess of Windsor.

== Athletics ==
In 2014 and 2015, the Oldfields School Cross-Country team won the Interscholastic Athletic Association of Maryland Conference C Championships. In 2015, the Oldfields School Badminton shared top honors in the IAAM Conference B Championship with Institute of Notre Dame.

During the 2023 uncertainty, Oldfields left the IAAM.

== Notable alumnae ==
- Niki de Saint Phalle, sculptor
- Wallis, Duchess of Windsor
- Alice du Pont Mills, Du Pont heiress
- Abir Muhaisen, princess of Jordan
- Helen Pitts-Blasi, American trainer of thoroughbred race horses
- Lana du Pont, Olympic equestrian
