= Majid bin Mohammed Al Maktoum =

Sheikh of Emirate of Dubai

Majid bin Mohammed bin Rashid Al Maktoum
- Sheikh
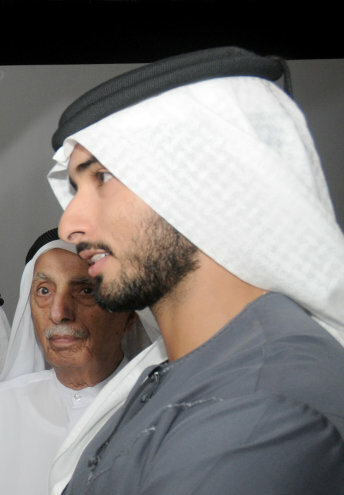
- Sheikh Majid in 2010
- Born: 16 October 1987 (age 39)
- Spouse: Hessa Beljafla (m. 2014)
- Issue: Mohammed; Dubai; Maitha; Rashid; Maktoum
Names
- Sheikh Majid bin Mohammed bin Rashid bin Saeed bin Maktoum bin Hasher bin Maktoum bin Butti bin Suhail Al Maktoum
- House: Al Maktoum
- Father: Mohammed bin Rashid Al Maktoum
- Mother: Houria Ahmed Lamara

Sheikh Majid bin Mohammed bin Rashid Al Maktoum (Arabic: ماجد بن محمد بن راشد آل مكتوم; born 16 October 1987) is a member of the House of Maktoum, the ruling royal family of the Emirate of Dubai. He is the fifth son of Sheikh Mohammed bin Rashid Al Maktoum, Vice President and Prime Minister of UAE and Emir of Dubai.

== Background and personal life ==
Born in Dubai, Sheikh Majid is a son of the ruler of Dubai, His Highness Sheikh Mohammed bin Rashid Al Maktoum, Emir of Dubai and Prime Minister of the United Arab Emirates. His mother, the Algerian born Houria Ahmed Lamara, was the fifth of the seven wives of his father. Majid's parents are divorced. He has three full siblings, all sisters, and their names are Sheikha Maitha, Sheikha Shamsa, and Sheikha Latifa.

In 2014, Majid married Hessa Beljafla. Majid and his wife have five children, three sons and two daughters, being:

- Sheikh Mohammed, born in 2015, twin with his sister Sheikha Dubai
- Sheikha Dubai, born in 2015, twin with her brother Sheikh Mohammed
- Sheikha Maitha, born in 2017
- Sheikh Rashid, born in 2019
- Sheikh Maktoum, born in 2022.

As the son of the Emir of Dubai and as a member of the Al Maktoum family, Majid receives a significant allowance and leads a luxurious lifestyle with hobbies like horse racing and hand gliding. The net worth of the Al Maktoum family is estimated at more than 20 billion dollars. According to Forbes, it is the fifth richest royal family in the world.

== Education ==
Sheikh Majid went to school at Rashid School For Boys after which he underwent military training at the Royal Military Academy Sandhurst, United Kingdom and Dubai Police Academy. Under his patronage, multiple cultural landmarks and sporting events have been built and started respectively in Dubai. He is married to Hessa Beljafla and has five children.

Sheikh Majid started his education in Dubai where he graduated from Rashid School For Boys in 2005. According to Sheikh Majid, his prime influence and greatest role model has been his father Sheikh Mohammed. After graduating, Sheikh Majid joined the Royal Military Academy Sandhurst in the United Kingdom. where he was honored with the Sword of Honour upon his graduation in 2007 among 484 cadets.

Sheikh Majid participated in a series of military camps and leadership seminars before enrolling in Dubai Police Academy where he studied security crisis management. His thesis, "Ingenuity in Crisis Management in line with the Vision of His Highness Sheikh Mohammed bin Rashid Al Maktoum," was informed by his studies at Royal Military Academy Sandhurst and Dubai Police Academy and by the ideology of his father Sheikh Mohammed. He graduated from Dubai Police Academy on 18 November 2009.

== Official duties and public life ==
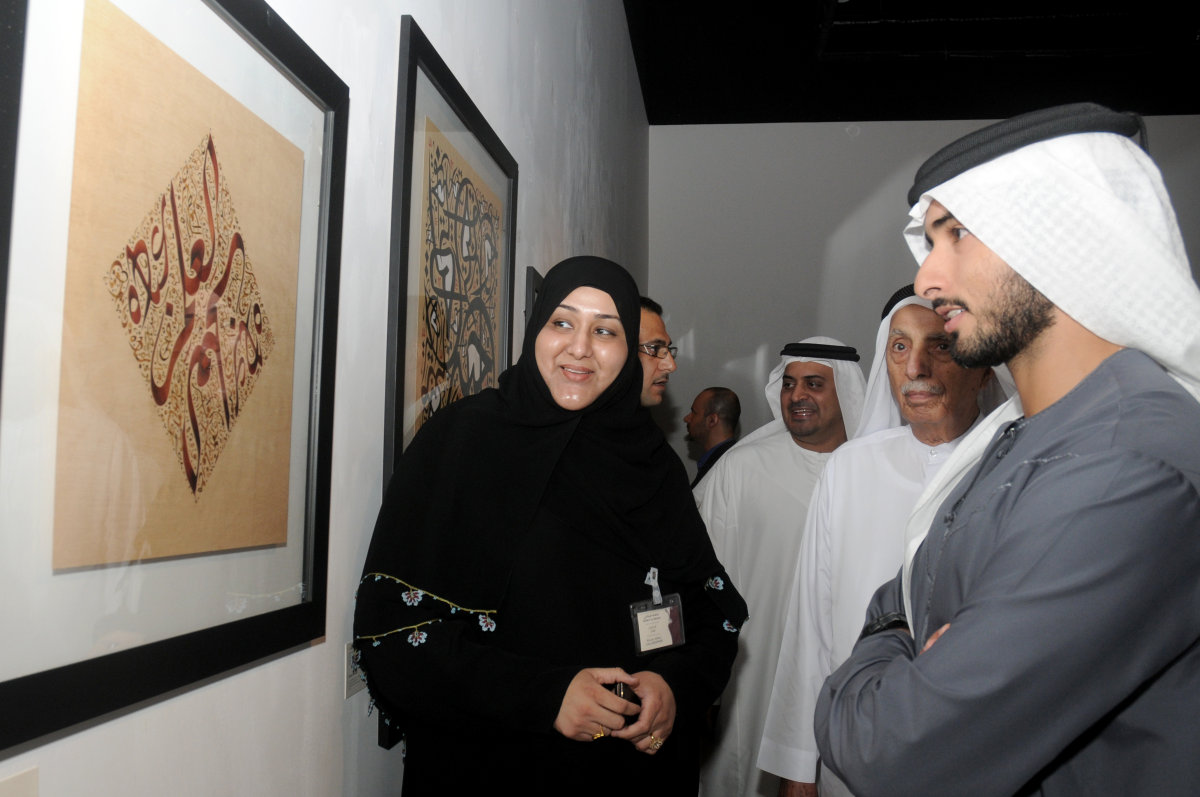
Sheikh Majid at Dubai Calligraphy Centre, October 2010

In March 2008, Dubai Culture and Arts Authority (DCAA) was established by a decree issued by Sheikh Mohammed bin Rashid Al Makhtoum and Sheikh Majid was appointed as Chairman of the entity. During his tenure, the Dubai Calligraphy Centre was set up, the Youth Media Awards of Dubai were launched, and the Al Ajer initiative during Ramadan was started. The Wa Sahebhoma Initiative was launched in order to allow young citizens of the UAE to be able to perform Umrah (pilgrimage) with their parents; this was in collaboration with the Mohammed bin Rashid Al Maktoum Humanitarian and Charity Establishment. In 2014, his half-sister Sheikha Latifa bint Mohammed Al Maktoum assumed the position. The UAE Nationals Training Initiative under Sheikh Majid aims at developing employment skills for UAE national youth to be able to handle executive and managerial positions.

Philanthropy efforts include his efforts at Dubai Cares as an ambassador of the Dubai Cares campaign along with his siblings, where he was a representative diplomat on behalf of Sheikh Mohammed bin Rashid Al Maktoum in several Islamic countries in Africa and Asia where the campaign's framework included providing education and knowledge infrastructure for over one million children in both Arabic and Islamic countries.

== Sporting interests and patronage ==
Sheikh Majid is a sportsman and is interested in the traditional sports of horse riding and camel riding as well as football (soccer), swimming, and shooting and actively pursues his interests in these sports. He is considered a pioneer and a guru of introducing CrossFit to the UAE. Under him a Dubai Fitness competition is conducted. The Gulf Film Festival is conducted under his patronage.

=== Camel and horse racing ===
Sheikh Majid has participated in professional horse and camel endurance races and is a patron of the horse and camel marathons. He led the UAE endurance team to victory at the 11th Pan Arab Games in Cairo in 2007, winning two gold medals in the individual and team events. In November 2008, he once again led the UAE endurance team to victory in the International Equestrian Federation (FEI) World Endurance Championship that took place in Malaysia and brought back the gold medal. Every year the Majid bin Mohammed Arabian Camel Marathon and Camel Racing World Championship is organised under his auspices.

=== Football and futsal ===
Al Wasl Football Club is a United Arab Emirates Football League club based in Dubai. It is a part of the multi-sports club Al Wasl Sports Club. Al Wasl FC is one of the most successful clubs in the UAE with a large fan base in the Arabian Peninsula. Sheikh Majid was appointed Vice President of Al Wasl Sports Club.

Since summer of 2011, the Majid bin Mohammed Futsal Championship is being organised with the participation of sixteen teams divided into four groups. Many of the games are hosted in schools and university gymnasiums. The success of this championship was largely due to the support of several governmental departments such as the UAE Football Association, the UAE Committee of Futsal and Dubai Sports Council, Dubai Media Incorporated, Dubai Police, and Dubai Corporation for Ambulance Services, in addition to Al Wasl Sports and Cultural Club that hosted the final games on their fields.

=== Sea Dubai Festival ===
Sea Dubai is a water sports festival that takes place in December of each year, and is one of the most important marine sports festival in the region as it attracts the attention of water sports fans around the globe. The festival hosts final rounds for the Class 1 World Powerboat Championship and the International Canoe Race, as well as traditional sailing races. Sheikh Majid bin Mohammed bin Rashid Al Maktoum, patron of the event, officially announced the launch of the festival during the prize distribution ceremony of the 2008 season, marking the beginning of the chain of events that have been organized by Mina Seyahi. "Sea Dubai" has grown to be one of the leading international sea festivals in the world and is very well-attended.
