= Mater Christi College =

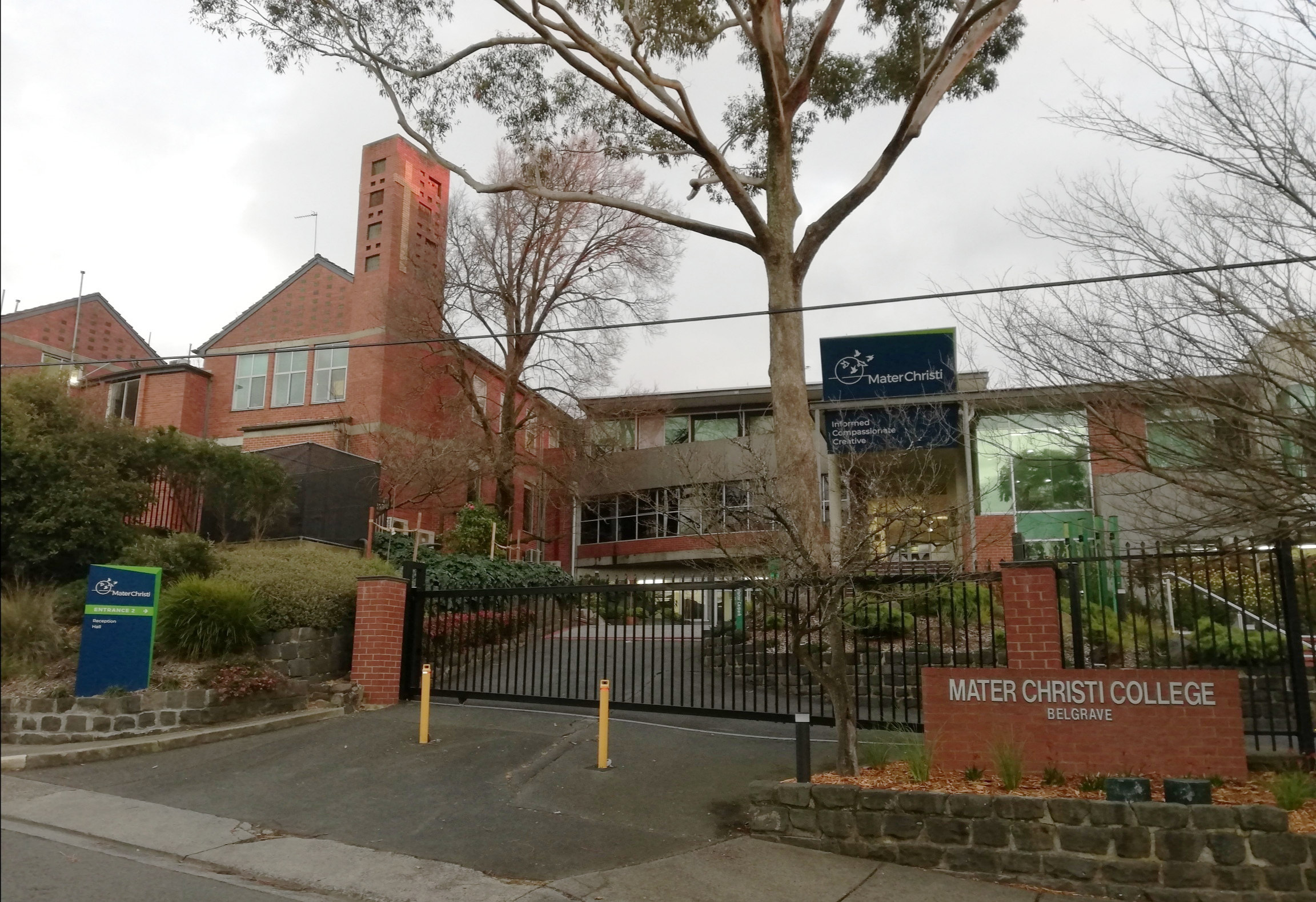

Location
- 28 Bayview Road; Belgrave, Victoria, 3160; Australia; 37°54′38″S 145°21′33″E

Information
- Type: Independent secondary day school
- Religious affiliations: Roman Catholic; Sisters of the Good Samaritan
- Established: 1963; 63 years ago
- Principal: Dr Maria Haggett
- Grades: 7–12
- Gender: Girls
- Enrollment: >700
- Colors: Purple, blue, green and orange
- Website: materchristi.edu.au

Mater Christi College is an independent Roman Catholic secondary school for girls located in the eastern Melbourne suburb of Belgrave, Victoria, Australia.

== History ==
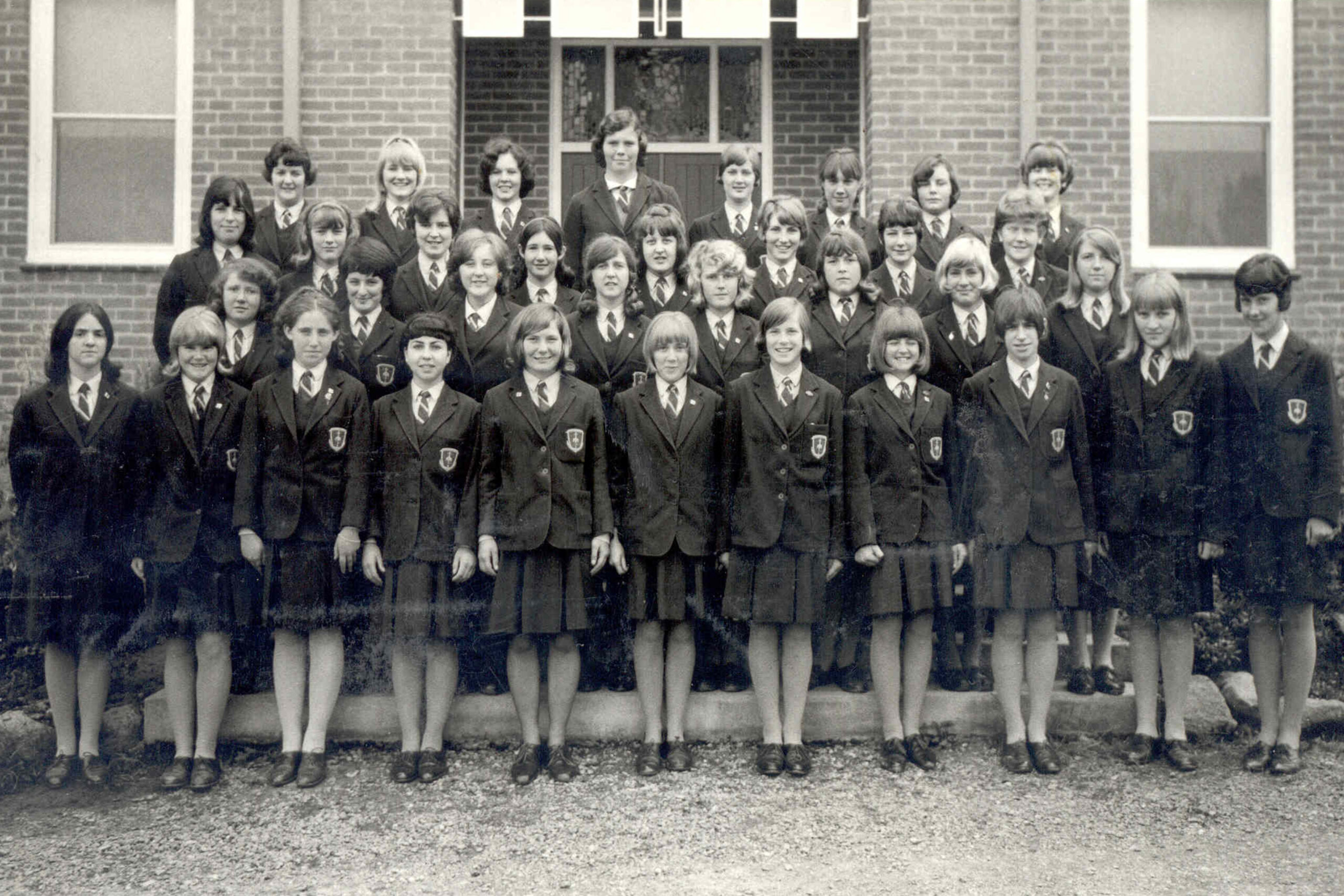
Foundation Year, Mater Christi College, Belgrave, Victoria, Australia

Mother Mary Olivera, Superior General of the Good Samaritan Order of the Catholic Church declared in 1962, “Let’s build a boarding school on top of the hill in Belgrave". Subsequently, the school was founded by the Sisters of the Good Samaritan religious order in 1963 outside Belgrave, overlooking the Dandenong Ranges of Victoria. Six Good Samaritan Sisters initially instructed 62 female students, offering an academic education, "based on the principles of Benedictine values". The site chosen in 1962 consisted of grounds which contained Heathermont, a c. 1920s guest house.

A cottage named Sunny Siesta was on the 90 degree turn at the top of Bayview Road and was where the first sisters established their convent in May 1962. The original chapel and classrooms were opened in 1964 and a new convent was established by 1974. In 2013, the college published a history: "Informed, Compassionate, Creative: Mater Christi College: a School of Good Samaritan Education Celebrating 50 Years 1963-2013" which revealed that in its early years, Mater Christi students who lived on nearby farms were permitted to ride their horses to school despite the nuns stating that doing so was "unladylike". While the school does not have an on-campus horse riding facility, it has long encouraged its students in co-curricular equine sports.

== 21st Century ==
The college was initially envisaged as a small day and boarding school and in 1966 the first matriculation (Year 12) class graduated. The rapidly growing population in the eastern suburbs of Melbourne saw Mater Christi College grow. In 2026 there were around 700 girls enrolled at the college. Some years earlier the student cohort population had been over 900 and included students from several Asia-Pacific countries. In 1989, an academic program for international students was established which subsequently resulted in the establishment of a boarding house being attached to the college. It closed in 2015. Mater Christi offers a broad range of subjects to suit students and is designed so that students undertake studies from all areas of learning at Years 7 to 12. Students are then able to select from a wide range of VCE units.

== Facilities ==
Facilities at Mater Christi College include:

- Full WiFi Campus
- MacBook Program
- Contemporary learning spaces
- Science Labs
- Library/Learning Commons
- Chapel
- Arts Studios / photography and ceramics
- Technology (textiles) centre
- One indoor hall with full sized basketball court
- An outdoor field training area
- Industry standard hospitality / food technology centres
- Outdoor tennis courts
- Dance Studio
- Cafe

== Notable alumnae ==
- Renae Hallinan, an Australian and Melbourne Vixens netballer.
- Jane Flemming, former Olympian athlete and Commonwealth medallist, sports media commentator
- Radha Stirling, human rights advocate
- Candy Yuen Ka-man, Miss Photogenic of Miss Hong Kong 2009 pageant, Hong Kong actress, show host
