= Hervé Jaubert =

French naval officer

- Born: March 13, 1956 (age 70); Paris, France
- Occupations: Yacht captain, businessman and security consultant

Hervé Jaubert (born 13 March 1956) is a French former Navy officer, marine engineer and DGSE agent. He moved to Stuart, Florida in the early 2000s where he set up a company to build and operate recreational submarines, under the Exomos brand. He then moved his firm to the United Arab Emirates. After the 2008 financial crisis, Exomos was closed. In May 2008, facing accusations in Dubai of fraud and embezzlement worth AED 14 million (US$3.8 million), Jaubert escaped from Dubai in a dinghy. He subsequently returned to Stuart, where he was a permanent US resident and wrote a book about his ordeal. On April 15, 2009, he was tried in absentia in Dubai and convicted of illegally acquiring AED 14 million by abusing his position with Exomos, a subsidiary of Dubai World, according to court records. He was sentenced to five years in prison but Jaubert denied the charges against him. His book, titled “Escape from Dubai” was published November 10, 2009.

== Events in the United Arab Emirates ==
=== Accusation of embezzlement and escape ===
In 2004, Sultan Ahmed bin Sulayem visited Jaubert's factory in Florida and invited him to move his firm to Dubai, United Arab Emirates. Jaubert accepted the invitation and bin Sulayem put him in charge of a new subsidiary of Dubai World. There, Jaubert set up a submarine manufacturing company with a factory, which after two years started making tourist submarines and superfast boats: it made four mini-submarines, a submersible yacht, and a larger submarine called Nautilus which could carry nine people.

Jaubert was put in charge of a newly formed subsidiary of Dubai World that Bin Sulayem chaired, which is the same company behind the development of Palm Jumeirah and World Islands. He lived with his American wife and two children in a villa with private swimming pool. According to Dubai courts, auditors investigating the company accounts found gaps and equipments that Mr Jaubert had ordered from his own company in Florida failed to arrive, or parts were faulty. He was alleged to have short-changed Dubai World by AED 14 million. According to Jaubert, the company wanted to pull the plug on the venture but wanted to blame someone first. Jaubert was questioned by auditors and the police. According to Jaubert, the police threatened Jaubert to "insert needles into your nose again and again". According to Jaubert, he promised to pay back the AED 14 million to buy time to escape. He had a travel ban and his passport was seized due to being under investigation. After his escape, the court found Jaubert guilty of embezzlement in absentia and sentenced him to five years in prison and ordered him to repay AED 14 million.

According to Jaubert's account, he got to Fujairah, where a set of frogman's kit was smuggled to him in parts. One night in May 2008, he put this frogman's kit on, and an Arab woman's abaya over it as a disguise. He slipped from his hotel to the beach at night disguised under the abaya and swam to the area's only police patrol boat, which was in a coastguard station, and climbed onto the boat and clogged its fuel lines to prevent pursuit. Next morning he made his escape on a rubber dinghy with a small outboard motor, and sailed and waited in international waters for six hours to a prearranged meeting with a fellow former spy in a sailing boat, just outside United Arab Emirates territorial waters. The sailing boat carried him in eight days to Mumbai in India, and from there in 2008 he went home to Florida.

After Jaubert escaped, Dubai World and Dubai police accused Jaubert of embezzlement, and said that at least two of his submarines he was contracted to work on did not work.

=== Latifa bint Mohammed Al Maktoum ===
On March 4, 2018, Hervé Jaubert, his crew, and a Finnish woman, Tiina Jauhiainen, helped Dubai Princess Latifa escape from Dubai. They were intercepted by Indian and Emirati special forces and abducted from their yacht off the coast of Goa, India. They were renditioned to Dubai and imprisoned in a secret prison. Two weeks later Jaubert was released, along with Jauhiainen and the three Filipino crew, no charges were ever filed against them, while India and Dubai were accused of the abduction and for violating international treaties.

In December 2018, his American ex-wife Helene Jaubert told American news website The Daily Beast that Hervé Jaubert and Radha Stirling had been in contact with princess Latifa bint Mohammed Al Maktoum (II) for 5 years and invented the whole disappearance scheme together. According to Helene, “The whole plan was for Herve to help her escape and once he got her out the daughter was going to get to the dad and say I want $3 million or else I’ll tell all to the media”. According to Helene, "It was a con. It’s a corrupt scheme gone haywire". Herve Jaubert denied these allegations on the news website. According to Stirling, Latifa phoned her from the boat in the middle of the ambush, saying she feared for her life and “was hearing gunshots.” According to Stirling, Latifa made the call via WhatsApp and evidence of the call was provided to authorities in the US and UK and made available to reporters, although The Daily Beast pointed out that a satellite phone is normally needed to call from their alleged location in the Indian Ocean. However, it was quickly established that the yacht Nostromo was outfitted with satellite phone. In August 2019, Tiina Jauhiainen gave her version of events to on-line magazine Insider. It was later discovered that the FBI assisted the UAE to locate Nostromo.

== Trials ==
On 28 June 2009 a court in Dubai tried Jaubert in absentia and found him guilty and sentenced him to 5 years imprisonment. George Dalton, Dubai World's chief counsel, stated in an interview in September 2009 that he was confident that a US Court would return a similar verdict against Jaubert.

On 9 September 2009 Jaubert filed a lawsuit in Martin County Court in Florida against Dubai World, for defamation, fraud, abuse of process by the Dubai police, and false imprisonment.

On 28 February 2011 at Fort Pierce, Florida the court rejected all Dubai World's claims against Herve Jaubert of breach of contract, fraud, embezzlement and theft. The court also found against Jaubert's claim of abuse of process, and Jaubert was not awarded any money damages or other relief.

On December 11 2019, a judgment by Sir Andrew McFarlane, the senior family judge in the high court of Justice in England, ruled on the balance of probabilities, that: Sheikh Mohammed orchestrated the attack of the yacht Nostromo and the abductions of Princess Latifa, Herve Jaubert and his crew, on their way to India, by armed Indian military forces in international waters. In the judgement, Sir Andrew said Indian military assaulted and treated badly Latifa and Herve Jaubert, threatening to kill them. Then, they handed them over to UAE authorities. Sir Andrew said there was no ground for doubting that it was Latifa who decided to escape from Dubai and not Herve Jaubert who was merely the facilitator.

== Books ==
Herve Jaubert published nine books:

- 1995: a book called "Il n' a plus de secrets dans les services" (ODILON MEDIA)
- 2009: a book called "Escape from Dubai" (ISBN 978-0929915944), about his Dubai experience.
- 2011: a novel called "The Boston Fracture" (ISBN 978-1466405615), a politico-techno-action thriller.
- 2015: Comment contredire un Musulman (French Edition) " (ISBN 978-1507506561)
- 2016: " Misere sexuelle des musulmans et violence (French Edition) " (ISBN 978-1540654960)
- 2016: " How to bust a Muslim in 20 questions: Islampology" (ISBN 978-1534780163)
- 2019: " Princess Latifa and the Spy" (ISBN 978-1093730685)
- 2022: A novel called "Beyond After " (ASIN B0B61LKYGF), a Pre & post-apocalyptic drama set in the near future in the Philippines.
- 2023: A book called "A private family matter" (ISBN 979-8396652781), about his abduction with Princess Latifa.
