= Tkiyet Um Ali =

Non-governmental organisation in Jordan

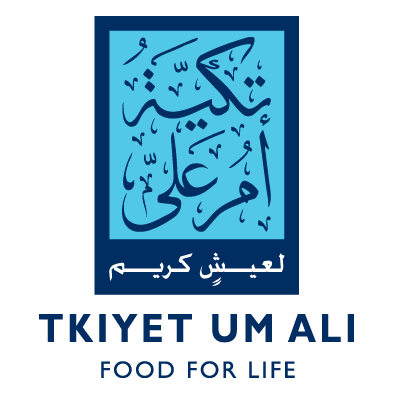
- Founded: 2003; 23 years ago
- Founder: conceptualized by Queen Alia al-Hussein, initiated by Princess Haya bint Al Hussein
- Type: non-profit organization
- Purpose: underprivileged citizens
- Location: Amman — Jordan
- Region served: Jordan
- Key people: Princess Haya bint Al Hussein, Chairperson
- Website: http://www.TUA.jo/

Tkiyet Um Ali (Arabic: تكية أم علي, romanized: Takiyyat ʾUmm ʿAlī) is a Jordanian non-governmental organisation founded by Princess Haya in honour of her late mother Queen Alia. It functions as a takiyya, which in the modern Arab world means a place or institution providing food assistance to people in need. Tkiyet Um Ali also provides other services to the needy and the hungry in Jordanian society.

== History ==
Originally conceptualised by Her Late Majesty Queen Alia more than 40 years ago, Tkiyet Um Ali (TUA) was founded in 2003 by Her Royal Highness Princess Haya Bint Al Hussein. It is an initiative that aims to eradicate hunger in the Arab World.

== Programmes ==
Tkiyet Um Ali is a food relief initiative primarily operating in the Arab world. It is an NGO in Jordan that serves sustainable hot meals and provide humanitarian aid on a daily basis to the poor and needy within Jordanian society in all locations. Tkiyet Um Ali assists 30,000 households living in extreme poverty throughout the Hashemite Kingdom of Jordan through food parcel deliveries consisting of basic life needs such as food and commodities.
