= Maitha bint Mohammed Al Maktoum =

Karate and taekwondo practitioner

- Sheikha
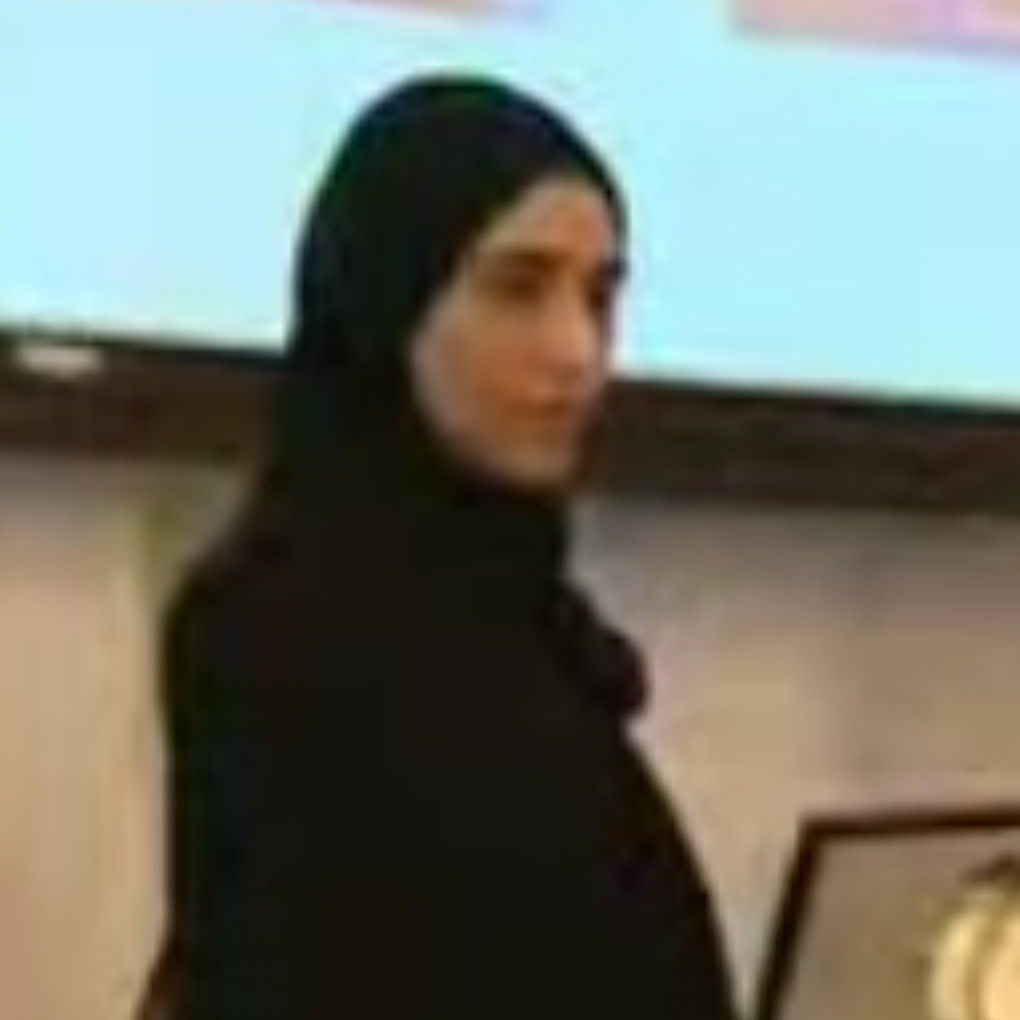
- Sheikha Maitha in 2006
- Born: 5 March 1980 (age 46); Dubai
Names
- Sheikha Maitha bint Mohammed bin Rashid bin Saeed bin Maktoum bin Hasher bin Maktoum bin Butti bin Suhail Al Maktoum
- House: Al Maktoum
- Father: Mohammed bin Rashid Al Maktoum
- Mother: Houria Ahmed Lamara

Sheikha Maitha bint Mohammed bin Rashid Al Maktoum (Arabic: مَيْثَاء بِنتِ مُحَمَّد ابْنِ رَاشِد آل مَكتُوم; born 5 March 1980) is a karate, taekwondo, polo athlete and Sheikha of Dubai. She represented the United Arab Emirates at the 2008 Summer Olympics, becoming the first female Olympian for her country.

== Personal life ==
Sheikha Maitha is the daughter of Sheikh Mohammed bin Rashid Al Maktoum, the Vice President and Prime Minister of the United Arab Emirates (UAE), and ruler of the Emirate of Dubai. Her mother is an Algerian, Houria Ahmed Lamara. She is the full sister of Sheikha Shamsa, Sheikha Latifa, and Sheikh Majid.

She was appointed as a board member of the Global Initiative Foundation in December 2015.

== Sports career ==
In 2000, Sheikha Maitha began her martial arts career. In 2004, she won the karate 65-kg class at the 10th Pan Arab Games and became the first UAE woman to win an international gold medal. Representing the United Arab Emirates in the 2006 Asian Games, she won the silver medal at the Women's Over 60 Kilogram karate event. In 2007, she won another gold medal at the 11th Pan Arab Games in Cairo. In March 2008, the UAE National Olympic Committee announced Sheikha Maitha's participation at the 2008 Summer Olympics, making her the first woman to represent the UAE. She participated in taekwondo in the women's 67 kg category.

In March 2011, she participated in the GCC Women's Sports Championships in Abu Dhabi and won the gold medal in Taekwondo. Sheikha Maitha started playing women's polo at the age of 32 as injuries prevented her from continuing martial arts. She participated with her team in the IFZA Silver Cup 2021 and advanced to the semi-finals. Her team won at the Polo Masters Cup 2021 and the Dubai Polo Challenge 2021.

== Accolades ==
In 2007, Sheikha Maitha was named Arab Sportswoman of the Year for winning the silver medal at the 2006 Asian Games. That same year, she was the first Arab woman to receive the World Fair Play Award in Paris, France. In 2008, she was included as 17th on the list of the "20 Hottest Young Royals" compiled by Forbes magazine.

== See also ==
- List of royal Olympians

Preceded by Saeed Al Maktoum	Flagbearer for United Arab Emirates; Beijing 2008	Succeeded by Saeed Al Maktoum
