= Abir Muhaisen =

Adopted daughter of King Hussein of Jordan

- Born: 1973 (age 52–53); Amman, Jordan
- Father: Hussein (adopted)
- Mother: Alia Al-Hussein (adopted)

Abir Muhaisen (Arabic: عبير محيسن; born 1973) is a Palestinian woman who was adopted as a child by King Hussein of Jordan and his third wife, Queen Alia, after Muhaisen's biological mother was killed in a plane crash at a Palestinian refugee camp in Amman, Jordan in 1976.

Muhaisen was educated in the United States. She briefly attended Garrison Forest School, a boarding school in Maryland, before graduating from Oldfields School in Glencoe, Maryland in 1991. She earned a Bachelor of Arts degree in Elementary Education from American University, and a Master of Arts in Sports Management and Physical Education from Virginia Commonwealth University.
