= Latifa bint Mohammed Al Maktoum (born 1985) =

Sheikha of Dubai

- Sheikha
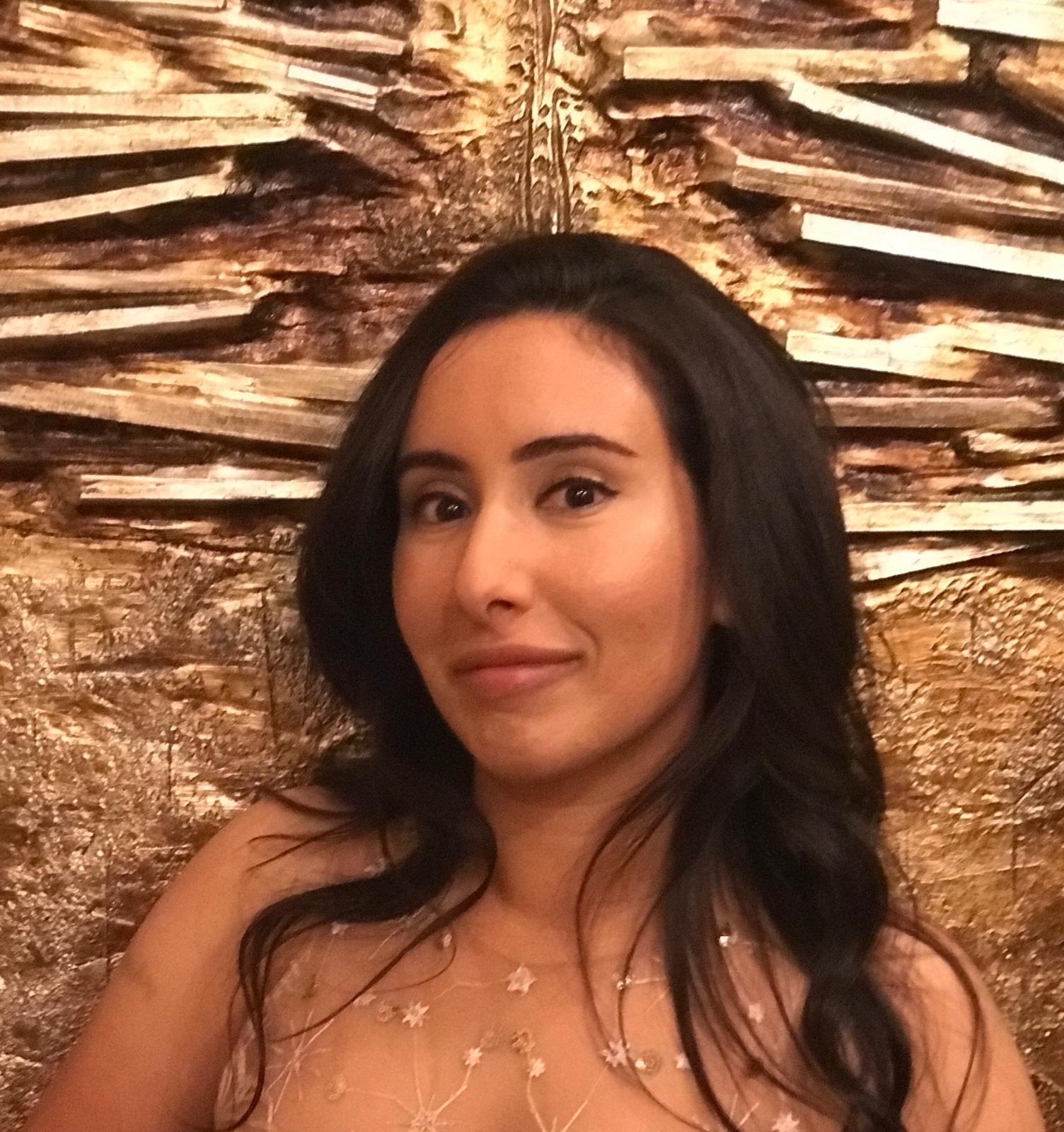
- Sheikha Latifa in January 2018
- Born: 5 December 1985 (age 40); Dubai, United Arab Emirates
Names
- Sheikha Latifa bint Mohammed bin Rashid bin Saeed bin Maktoum bin Hasher bin Maktoum bin Butti bin Suhail Al Maktoum
- House: Al Maktoum
- Father: Mohammed bin Rashid Al Maktoum
- Mother: Huriah Ahmed al M'aash
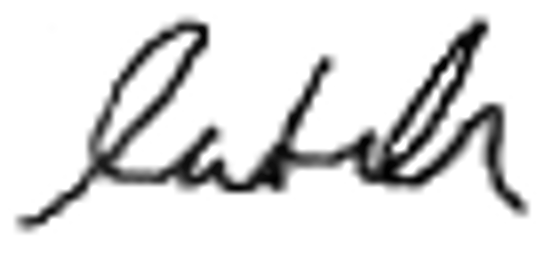
- Signature

Sheikha Latifa bint Mohammed bin Rashid Al Maktoum (Arabic: لطيفة بنت محمد بن راشد آل مكتوم, romanized: Laṭīfa bint Muḥammad bin Rāshid Āl Maktūm; born 5 December 1985) is an Emirati princess and a member of the Dubai ruling family. She is the daughter of Sheikh Mohammed bin Rashid Al Maktoum, Prime Minister of the UAE, and an Algerian woman named Huriah Ahmed al M'aash.

Sheikha Latifa has two half-sisters with the same name. She is the full sister of Sheikha Maitha (born 1980), Sheikha Shamsa (born 1981), and Sheikh Majid (born 1987).

Sheikha Latifa escaped from Dubai in late February 2018 but was forcibly returned from international waters near the Indian coast by a joint India–Emirates operation on 4 March 2018. In December 2018, the Dubai royal court said that she was back in Dubai. She was believed to be held against her will under the order of her father, Sheikh Mohammed bin Rashid Al Maktoum. In June 2021, a brief statement issued on her behalf by law firm Taylor Wessing stated that she was free to travel and wants privacy. In August 2021 and after Latifa had been photographed in public places in Dubai, Spain and Iceland, the #FreeLatifa campaign, which had lasted three and a half years, came to an end. In February 2022, the UN High Commissioner for Human Rights, Michelle Bachelet, stated that she met Latifa in Paris and that Latifa was well and wished for respect for her privacy.

== Early life ==
Sheikha Latifa is one of Sheikh Mohammed bin Rashid Al Maktoum's children. Her mother is Huriah Ahmed al M'aash, and she was born on 5 December 1985.

In a video statement, Sheikha Latifa said that she and her brother Sheikh Majid spent their early childhood under the care of their paternal aunt. Her early education was at the Dubai English Speaking School and later at the International School of Choueifat, with one year at the Latifa School for Girls. Sheikha Latifa is an experienced skydiver, coached by former world champion skydiver Stefania Martinengo, and held accelerated freefall instructor rating.

In 2002, at the age of 16 years, a first attempt by Sheikha Latifa to escape ended in her capture at the Emirati-Omani border; she was subsequently jailed for three years and four months. She claimed in the video statement to have been kept in solitary confinement and subject to "constant torture", physically through beatings and mentally, during her arrest.

== 2018 disappearance ==
Nostromo location before disappearance
15.684°N 73.222°E

On 24 February 2018, Sheikha Latifa and her Finnish friend Tiina Jauhiainen left Dubai in a car and crossed the border to Oman. They left Oman on jet skis and joined American–French citizen and former French intelligence officer Hervé Jaubert and his crew on the yacht Nostromo. Two days later, she made contact with Radha Stirling of Detained in Dubai, notifying Stirling of her departure from Dubai. She also posted a few departing messages on her verified Instagram social media account.

On 3 March 2018, Jaubert made contact with an Indian journalist in preparation for the end of their journey. The following day, Sheikha Latifa, Jaubert and Jauhiainen, along with the crew of three Philippine nationals, were intercepted by Indian authorities while approaching Goa on the U.S.-registered yacht Nostromo, call sign WDG9847. An investigation by The Guardian and Bureau of Investigative Journalism later revealed that on the same day, Signalling System No. 7 protocol was exploited in an attempt to locate Jaubert's phone. The Daily Beast's investigation revealed the FBI assisted the UAE to locate Nostromo.

On 9 March 2018, the Daily Mail broke the news of the disappearance of Nostromo and those aboard, after being contacted by Sheikha Latifa's representatives.

She had made a 39-minute video before the escape attempt, to be released in case her life was in danger, and it was made public on 11 March 2018. Recorded at Jauhiainen's apartment, the video explains her family background and the circumstances leading to her decision to flee. In the video, she also accuses her father of maltreatment of her and her sister Shamsa along with other serious charges, including murder.

The Finnish National Bureau of Investigation confirmed the disappearance of Jauhiainen and opened an investigation in collaboration with the Finnish Ministry for Foreign Affairs. The brother of Jauhiainen confirmed her friendship with Sheikha Latifa.

On 20 March 2018, Nostromo was spotted at the port of Fujairah in the UAE. It left the next day for Sri Lanka with the released crew, including Jaubert and three Philippine nationals, on board. Nostromo reached Galle, Sri Lanka, on 2 April 2018.

On 22 March 2018, Sheikha Latifa's companion Jauhiainen was found, prompting the Finnish Ministry for Foreign Affairs to terminate its search in cooperation with the Dubai authorities. The location where Jauhiainen was found and details of prior events were not shared officially, but according to her family she returned from Dubai to Finland that night.

According to Detained in Dubai, a number of people were detained or interrogated in connection to the event in UAE and Oman, notably Christian Elombo, a French national whose family is living in Luxembourg; Elombo spent more than a month in custody in Oman, from late February to 5 April 2018. After being released without charge, he was again taken into custody in Luxembourg on 6 April 2018 for 41 days under an Interpol Red Notice issued by the UAE. The notice was later retracted without notification or producing any evidence for the cited kidnapping charges.

=== Interception of the yacht Nostromo ===
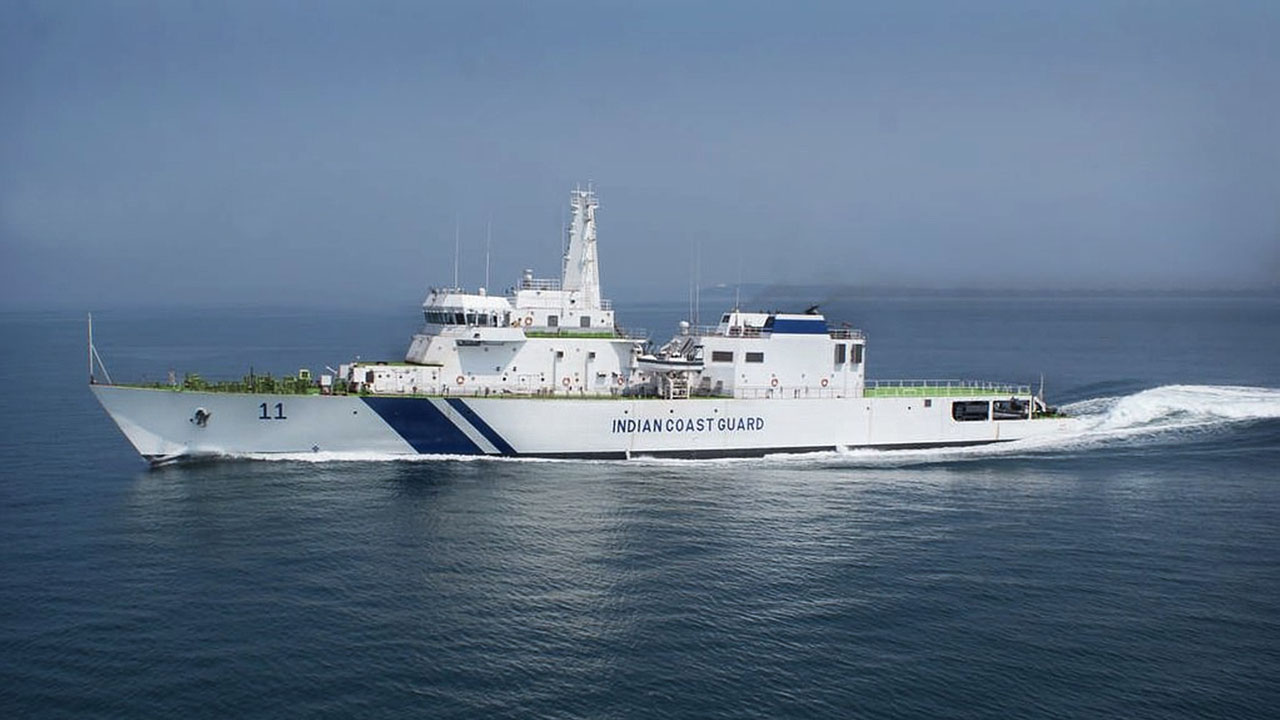
Indian Coast Guard Offshore patrol vessel ICGS Samarth

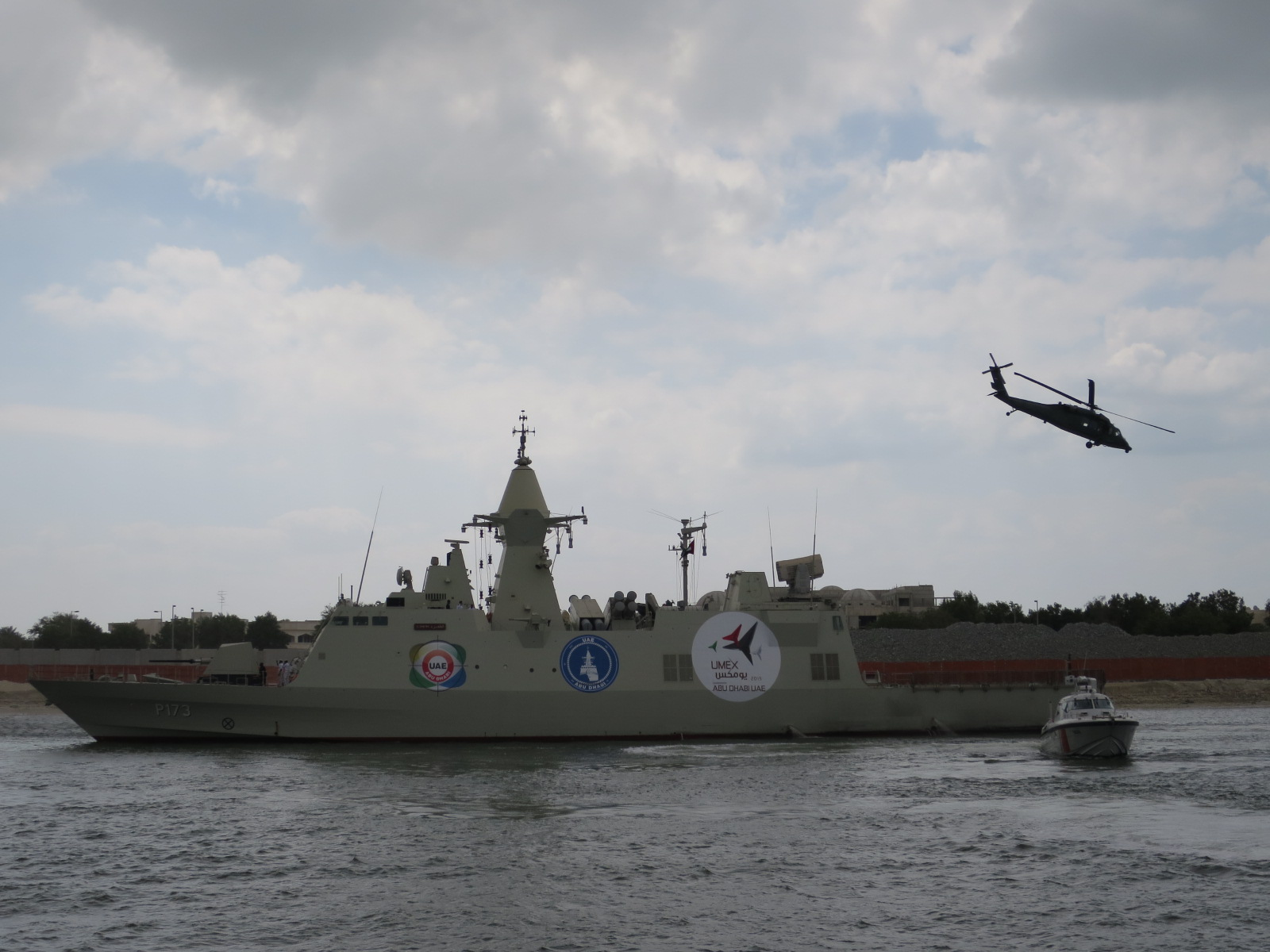
UAE Navy Baynunah-class corvette

According to the testimonies of the crew, the yacht was being actively searched for by Indian Coast Guard search and rescue aircraft SAR CG 782 on 3 March 2018. On the day of interception, the yacht was scouted by another aircraft. Before the raid on 4 March 2018, three marine vessels were spotted on radar by Nostromo's crew, tailing it at a speed of less than 5 knots. Two of the vessels were later identified as ICGS Shoor and ICGS Samarth, described in media statements by Jaubert: "The two coast guards vessels had a huge marking on the side of the hull, which read 'Indian Coast Guard' and one had an ID number painted: 11".

After sunset two unmarked speedboats carrying six to eight armed Indian MARCOS Special Forces personnel in full military gear and Tavor assault rifles were launched from these ships to intercept Nostromo. The raid began with the use of stun and smoke grenades to disorient and incapacitate the crew, who were then handcuffed. After being taken over by Indian Coast Guard, the yacht was boarded by at least ten Emirati special forces personnel, who arrived by helicopter. Sheikha Latifa, despite claiming asylum to Indian personnel and expressing a clear unwillingness to go back to the UAE from where she was fleeing, was forcefully taken away onto one of the ships. Nostromo and the rest of the crew were taken to the naval base in Fujairah, escorted by the Indian Coast Guard and then transferred to UAE warship Baynunah.

According to Radha Stirling's account, she received her last voice message from Latifa during the alleged raid in a panicked state, telling her "Radha please help me, there are men outside" and that she had heard "gunshots". Further attempts of communication from those on-board Nostromo allegedly failed due to jamming from an Indian electronic warfare aircraft.

In total, at least three Indian and two Emirati warships, two military planes, and a helicopter were involved in the raid on Nostromo, about 50 miles off the coast of Goa.

=== Media reactions and aftermath ===
In the early days after the disappearance of the yacht Nostromo and its crew, the news was primarily carried on English and Finnish tabloids with awareness campaigns in social media. Jauhiainen and Jaubert made their first public appearance after the incident in a press conference arranged by Detained in Dubai in London despite alleged threats from the UAE government to stay silent.

Following a period without mention in the Gulf media, in mid-April the Western media reported the first reaction from the UAE, originating from an anonymous source close to the Dubai government. According to that source, Sheikha Latifa had been "brought back", was now "with her family", and "doing excellent". The source further claimed the incident had been a "private matter" that had been used to "tarnish the reputation of Dubai and Sheikh Mohammed," and said that three of those who had accompanied Sheikha Latifa were wanted in Dubai on previous charges. In May 2018, Human Rights Watch questioned Dubai's story, and asked Dubai authorities to reveal her location, adding: "[f]ailure to disclose the whereabouts and status of the princess could qualify as an enforced disappearance". Dubai authorities said that they could not comment on her case for legal reasons. The UN OHCHR Working Group on Enforced or Involuntary Disappearance sought responses on allegations from the Governments of India and UAE.

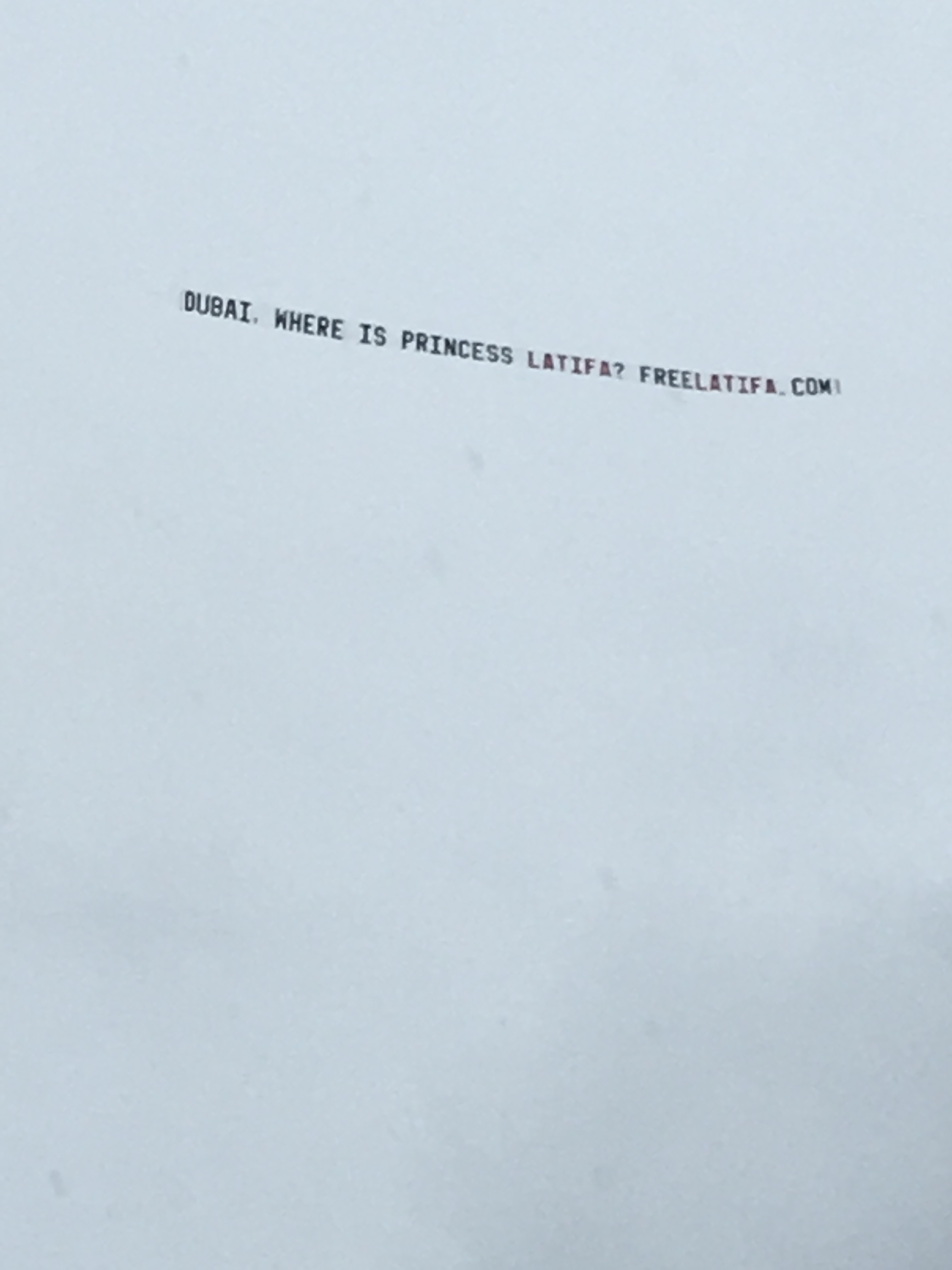
Banner flown at the 2018 Kentucky Derby

Ad-Diyar, a mainstream Arab newspaper in Lebanon, published calls by Human Rights Watch raising the issue that Sheikha Latifa had been forcibly hidden. Support groups raised awareness of the campaign at the 2018 Kentucky Derby by flying a banner saying "DUBAI, WHERE IS PRINCESS LATIFA?".

The UAE-controlled media began reporting extensively about the social activities of her half-sister with the same name, who serves as Vice Chairman of Dubai Culture and Arts Authority. Many news outlets reported show jumper Sheikha Latifah bint Ahmed bin Juma Al Maktoum as missing, due to similarity in names.

The Indian government was widely criticised for its extrajudicial outreach, citing national interests and disregard of formal legal process. Indian media reported that Prime Minister Narendra Modi and his advisers were directly involved in giving the orders for interception at the request of Sheikh Mohammed bin Rashid Al Maktoum and didn't seek any formal request from UAE. An Indian Ministry of External Affairs spokesperson claimed that "[n]o such incident has been brought to our notice." Deputy Commandant Avinandan Mitra of the Indian Coast Guard, in response to media queries about this incident near the Indian coastline, said that "we have no such information or operation." Indian Intelligence agencies said they were trying to verify the claims but had no further comment. On 2 January 2019, Minister of State for External Affairs V. K. Singh denied any involvement of Indian Government in repatriation of emirati princess while replying to a question raised by member of parliament Saugata Roy. According to ThePrint, extradition of Christian Michel from UAE to India on 19 November 2018 was a direct result of Indian involvement in forced return of Sheikha Latifa as a quid pro quo.

Similarly, the Finnish government was criticised for not raising concerns about a human rights violation of one of their citizens to Indian authorities. A day later, the Finnish Minister of Foreign Affairs, Timo Soini, responded, saying Finland had been in correspondence with UAE and Indian officials about the issue outside of media.

Amnesty International, on 4 September 2018, released a public statement appealing to the government of UAE to disclose the whereabouts of Sheikha Latifa and uphold its international legal obligations, while also calling upon the Indian government to investigate any role of its security forces and officials involved in the raid on Nostromo and unlawful excesses that may have been committed.

On 6 December 2018, the release of the BBC Two documentary Escape from Dubai: The Mystery of the Missing Princess elicited the first official response on the matter from the Dubai royal court in the form of a brief statement saying that Latifa was safe at home. The documentary covered the escape attempt that Sheikha Latifa had spent seven years planning and looked into her sister Shamsa's attempt to escape in 2000. In January 2019, Sheikh Mohammed bin Rashid Al Maktoum's wife, Princess Haya al-Hussein of Jordan, half-sister of King Abdullah II of Jordan, spoke in defense of Dubai's treatment of Sheikha Latifa. After news reports of Princess Haya's alleged separation with Mohammed bin Rashid Al Maktoum, human rights campaigners called on Princess Haya to speak out on her stepdaughter Latifa's fate in Dubai.

The matter was referred to the United Nations special rapporteur on extrajudicial, summary, or arbitrary executions by Guernica 37, a London-based law firm representing Latifa and her two friends. Chairman-rapporteur, Bernard Duhaime of the UN's working group on enforced or involuntary disappearances wrote to Dubai's royal family requesting evidence that Latifa was alive and the grounds on which she was being held captive or else they would have to make a public statement.

In February 2021, a UN investigation determined that the princess was exchanged for British arms dealer Christian Michel, who was extradited from Dubai to Delhi to be tried for paying bribes.

==== Visit from Mary Robinson ====
On 24 December 2018, three low-resolution photographs taken on 15 December 2018, showing Sheikha Latifa alongside Mary Robinson, the former United Nations High Commissioner for Human Rights, and former president of the republic of Ireland, were released by UAE authorities. According to Mary Robinson, the meeting was arranged by one of the wives of Mohammed bin Rashid Al Maktoum, Princess Haya. Robinson described Latifa in a BBC Radio 4 interview as a "troubled young woman" who regretted making the earlier video in which she alleged abuse, and was receiving psychiatric care. The comments were criticised by various rights groups and Detained in Dubai's head Radha Stirling for reciting Dubai's official version of the events "almost verbatim". Human rights groups and associates of Sheikha Latifa questioned the nature of the brief visit, calling for independent investigation and assessment of her situation and disputing suggestions of any psychiatric problems and reiterating the possibility of her being held under captivity. Robinson later told the BBC that she had been "horribly tricked".

David Haigh and Marcus Essabri, Latifa's cousin, commenting on the released photos of Latifa, stated that Sheikha Latifa appeared to have been forcibly medicated while held in Dubai under orders of her father, Sheikh Mohammed bin Rashid Al Maktoum.

==== 2019 court proceedings ====
In December 2019, a UK family court ruled that, on the balance of probabilities, Sheikh Mohammed orchestrated the abductions of Sheikha Latifa and Sheikha Shamsa and subjected Princess Haya to a campaign of "intimidation"; the findings were published in March 2020.

==== 2021 documentary ====
Latifa was held captive in a private villa in Dubai after her attempted escape from her family in February 2018. In April 2019, human rights lawyer and founder of Detained International David Haigh and Tiina Jauhiainen were able to covertly re-establish communication with her and began obtaining text and video messages from her. The communication abruptly ended on 21 July 2020 when Latifa stopped responding to messages.

In February 2021, the footage obtained by Haigh and Jauhiainen was used in Panorama, a BBC program that showed Latifa recounting how she had fought back against the soldiers taking her off the boat until she was tranquilized and carried onto a private jet which landed in Dubai. The United Nations human rights office asked the UAE to present proof that Princess Latifa was alive. On 9 April 2021, the organization said that the Emirates stated that Sheikha Latifa was being cared for by her family but failed to provide a "proof of life" for her. A spokesperson also said that the Emirates had in principle agreed to a meeting about Sheikha Latifa between senior United Nations officials and the Emirati ambassador in Geneva. On 21 April, independent United Nations advisers said in a statement that they were "alarmed" that the Emirates had not provided any concrete information, and that the statement by the Emirati authorities was not sufficient. The United States response to the statement, which said that freedom from arbitrary detention was a universal human right, was described in the New York Times as "muted".

==== 2021 Kentucky Derby complaint ====
On 28 April 2021, days before the Kentucky Derby in which Latifa's father Sheikh Mohammed bin Rashid Al Maktoum had a horse named Essential Quality who was considered a favorite to win, a group of human rights lawyers and students at the University of Louisville filed a complaint with the Kentucky Horse Racing Commission, asking for the Sheikh and Essential Quality to be barred from the Derby on the grounds of Sheikha Latifa's alleged situation. The Racing Commission announced on 29 April that as the complaint had not articulated a violation of its regulations, no sanctions would be put in place.

==== 2021 Mall of the Emirates photo appearance ====
On 22 May 2021, a photo that appears to show Princess Latifa sitting with two other women in a Dubai shopping mall, the Mall of the Emirates, was posted online and shared on two public Instagram accounts. Although the image has not been verified, a friend of Latifa's confirmed that it is a photo of the princess. According to sources, the women who posted the photo were paid to do so. Some human rights activists asked the UK government to help.

==== 2021 Madrid–Barajas Airport appearance ====
In June 2021, pictures of Latifa at Adolfo Suárez Madrid–Barajas Airport were posted on Instagram by former Royal Navy member Sioned Taylor, who had also published photos showing Latifa in the Mall of the Emirates. She mentioned they were on a "Great European holiday with Latifa". David Haigh, co-founder of the Free Latifa campaign, stated that they were "pleased to see Latifa seemingly having a passport, travelling and enjoying an increasing degree of freedom", and confirmed that several campaign members had been contacted directly by the princess herself.

==== 2021 UAE Pegasus surveillance leaks ====
In July 2021, leaked data from the surveillance firm NSO Group Pegasus spyware revealed that a list of UAE-targeted phone numbers included numbers for Latifa and several of her close friends. Pegasus spyware allows full access, including GPS, to target phones, and may have helped to track Latifa's escape route.

A mobile device belonging to the British human rights lawyer representing Latifa, David Haigh, was also found to be compromised with Pegasus.

=== 2021 end of #FreeLatifa campaign ===
In August 2021, after Latifa had been photographed in public places in Dubai, Spain and Iceland, the #FreeLatifa campaign, which had lasted three and a half years, came to an end. Human rights lawyer David Haigh, Latifa's cousin Marcus Essabri and Sioned Taylor, observing her wellbeing, described her situation as "the best position she has been in, in terms of freedom, for two decades". The FreeLatifa campaign stated:

Following the meeting between Marcus and Latifa in Iceland it has been decided that the most appropriate step at this time is to close the Free Latifa campaign. The primary purpose of the Free Latifa campaign was to see Latifa free leading the life she chooses for herself. We have clearly gone a long way towards achieving that goal over the last three years, with bodies such as the United Nations now monitoring the current and future wellbeing of Latifa.

David Haigh, co-founder of the Free Latifa campaign encouraged caution, saying: "It's quite right and understandable that everyone needs to look at everything that's happening now with extreme caution and monitor the situation closely."

In April 2023, an unverified account opened on Instagram under Latifa's name shared a statement, thanking people who showed interest in her well-being and claiming "I can understand it from the outside perspective of seeing someone so outspoken fall off the grid and have others speak on her behalf, especially after everything that has happened which appears to make me look like I'm being controlled. I am totally free and living an independent life."

== Controversy ==
In May 2018, Helene Jaubert, ex-wife of former French Navy officer Hervé Jaubert told The Daily Beast that Jaubert and Radha Stirling had been in contact with Latifa for five years, and invented the scheme together: "The whole plan was for Hervé to help her escape and once he got her out the daughter was going to get to the dad and say 'I want $3 million or else I'll tell all to the media'. It was a con. It's a corrupt scheme gone haywire". According to Stirling, Latifa phoned her from the boat in the middle of the ambush, saying she feared for her life and "was hearing gunshots". Latifa made the call via WhatsApp and evidence of the call was provided to authorities in the United Kingdom and the United States and made available to reporters. The Daily Beast pointed out that a satellite phone is normally needed to call from their alleged location in the Indian Ocean. However, it was established that the Nostromo was outfitted with satellite phone. In August 2019, Tiina Jauhiainen gave her version of events to online magazine Insider.

=== FBI role in capture ===
According to USA Today, the Federal Bureau of Investigation (FBI), "responding to an urgent plea from the powerful Dubai leader's office, provided assistance essential to [Latifa's] capture." The article went on to say "USA TODAY's sources said they believe the FBI was misled about her circumstances aboard the yacht". The FBI declined to comment.

== See also ==
- Lists of solved missing person cases
