= Shamsa bint Mohammed Al Maktoum =

Emirati princess

- Sheikha
- Born: 15 August 1981 (age 45); Dubai
Names
- Sheikha Shamsa bint Mohammed bin Rashid bin Saeed bin Maktoum bin Hasher bin Maktoum bin Butti bin Suhail Al Maktoum
- House: Al Maktoum
- Father: Mohammed bin Rashid Al Maktoum
- Mother: Huriah Ahmed al M'aash

Sheikha Shamsa bint Mohammed bin Rashid Al Maktoum (Arabic: شمسة بنت محمد بن راشد آل مكتوم, Shamsa bint Muḥammad bin Rāshid Āl Maktūm; born 15 August 1981) is an Emirati princess and a member of the Dubai ruling family. Her father, Sheikh Mohammed bin Rashid Al Maktoum, is the prime minister of the United Arab Emirates, and her mother, Huriah Ahmed al M'aash, is from Algeria. She is the full sister of Sheikha Maitha (born 1980), Sheikha Latifa (born 1985) and Sheikh Majid (born 1987).

In July 2000, whilst on holiday in the United Kingdom, she fled her family and stayed with friends in London. In August 2000, she was abducted by men working for her father off the street in Cambridge, and taken back to Dubai on a private jet. In 2020, a UK Family Court found that her father orchestrated her abduction.

== Disappearance in 2000 ==
In summer 2000, Shamsa was in the United Kingdom on holiday with her extended family residing at their Longcross estate near Chobham in Surrey. In an attempt to seek a better future for herself and escape restrictions on her life in Dubai, she used the opportunity to flee from her family in mid July 2000. After her escape, she stayed with friends for a few weeks in a London flat before being found by her family.

In August 2000, Shamsa was forcibly picked up by what she describes as four Arab men carrying guns from the streets of Cambridge while walking out of a bar and taken back to Dubai on a private jet. In March 2001, after having been contacted by a British solicitor who had spoken to Shamsa, Cambridgeshire police began investigating the incident. During inquiries, people close to Shamsa in the United Kingdom substantiated her story of escape, and the matter was raised in Parliament; the police investigation stalled, however, which was alleged at the time as being due to denial of access to her by Dubai authorities and non-cooperation of the Longcross estate staff. According to the Foreign Office, Sheikh Mohammed himself tried to intervene with the British government over the police investigation.

As of July 2023, Shamsa has not been seen in public in the 23 years since her disappearance.

== 2018 revival of investigation ==
In March 2018, Shamsa's sister Latifa also attempted to escape and was also forcibly recaptured and brought back to Dubai. Her video-statement corroborating story of Shamsa's attempted escape, her own abuse and their imprisonment in a family-owned compound brought the almost two decades old incident back into media focus, as has a BBC Panorama documentary of 16 February 2021 about Latifa's plight. Appeals by various human rights groups and campaigners seeking release of the two sisters made a United Nations special rapporteur to seek official response from the United Arab Emirates as well. A few months later in 2019, Princess Haya had to leave Dubai with her children reportedly due to feeling threatened after inquiring about the sisters on her own.

In December 2018, the police investigation on Shamsa's disappearance was reopened after testimony of Shamsa's cousin Marcus Essabri (then Fatima Essabri) living in the United Kingdom, and their mutual correspondence before her disappearance made her wishes for freedom apparent.

Essabri called for the release of both Shamsa and Latifa from Dubai and Sheikh Mohammed's prison. He also features on the BBC Panorama documentary that was originally broadcast on 16 February 2021.

== 2019 court proceedings ==
In December 2019, a United Kingdom family court ruled that – on the balance of probabilities – Sheikh Mohammed orchestrated the abductions of Sheikha Latifa and Sheikha Shamsa and subjected Princess Haya to a campaign of "intimidation"; the findings were published in March 2020.

Police have subsequently said that the lapsed investigation into Shamsa's disappearance is to be reviewed.

== See also ==
- List of people who disappeared mysteriously (2000–present)
