= Princess Haya bint Hussein =

King Hussein I of Jordan's daughter

Princess Haya bint Al Hussein
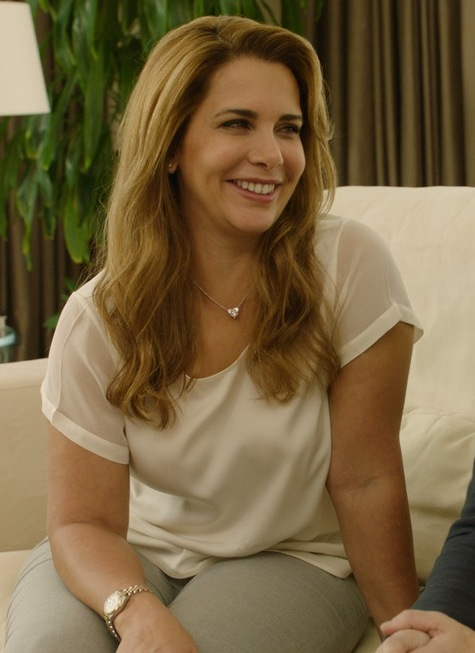
- Princess Haya in 2017
- Born: 3 May 1974 (age 52); Amman, Jordan
- Spouse: Mohammed bin Rashid Al Maktoum (m. 2004; div. 2019)
- Issue: Sheikha Al Jalila bint Mohammed Al Maktoum; Sheikh Zayed bin Mohammed Al Maktoum
Names
- Haya bint Hussein bin Talal bin Abdullah
- House: Hashemite (by birth); Al Maktoum (by marriage)
- Father: Hussein of Jordan
- Mother: Alia Toukan

Princess Haya bint Al Hussein (Arabic: الأميرة هيا بنت الحسين; born 3 May 1974) is the daughter of King Hussein of Jordan and his third wife, Queen Alia. She is the half-sister of King Abdullah II.

Haya is a graduate of the University of Oxford in England and an accomplished equestrian. She represented Jordan at the 2000 Summer Olympics in Sydney and was a two-term President of the International Federation for Equestrian Sports (FEI).

In 2004, Haya became the second official wife of the ruler of the Emirate of Dubai, Sheikh Mohammed bin Rashid Al Maktoum. They had two children, Sheikha Al Jalila and Sheikh Zayed. In 2019, Haya and Mohammed divorced, and she left Dubai with her children to reside in the United Kingdom. Legal proceedings between Haya and Mohammed before the High Court in London over custody of their children attracted considerable media attention. On 5 March 2020, a British court ruled that on the balance of probabilities, Sheikh Mohammed, the absolute ruler of Dubai and the prime minister of the UAE, had abducted two of his daughters, Shamsa and Latifa, and had threatened Haya. In March 2022, the court awarded sole custody of the couple's two children to Haya.

== Early life and education ==
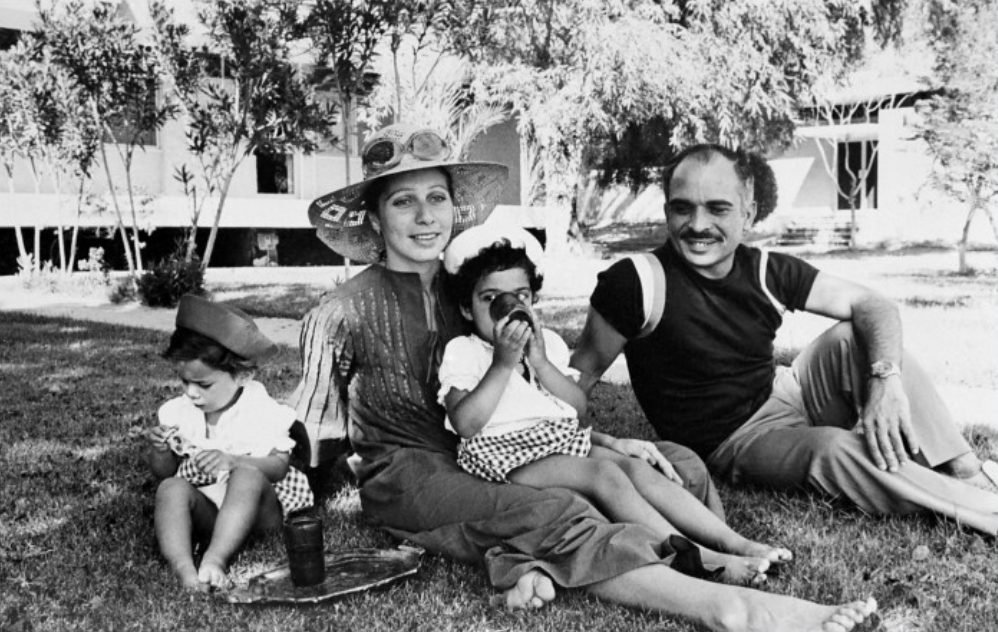
King Hussein and Queen Alia with their children Prince Ali and Princess Haya, 1976

Princess Haya was born in Amman, the capital of the Hashemite Kingdom of Jordan, the daughter of King Hussein and his third wife, Queen Alia. She has a younger brother, Prince Ali bin Hussein born on 23 December 1975, and older sister, Abir Muhaisen (born 1973), the latter of whom was adopted by Haya's parents after her biological mother was killed by a plane crash at their Palestinian refugee camp in Amman. In 1977, when Haya was 3 years old, her mother died in a helicopter crash. Her father died from complications related to non-Hodgkin's lymphoma in 1999, leaving the crown to her half-brother, King Abdullah II.

She was educated in the United Kingdom, where in 1985, she attended Badminton School in Bristol, and later the Bryanston School in Dorset. From 1993 to 1995, she was enrolled at St Hilda's College, Oxford, from which she graduated with a BA honours degree in philosophy, politics, and economics (PPE).

== Sports career ==
Princess Haya began horse riding internationally when she was 13. In 1992, she took the bronze medal in individual Jumping at the seventh Pan Arab Games in Damascus, Syria, and in 1993 was named Jordan's athlete of the year. Princess Haya was the first woman to represent her native Jordan in international equestrian sport and the only woman to win a medal in the Pan-Arab Equestrian Games. Having trained for several years in Ireland and Germany, she qualified for the 2000 Summer Olympics in Sydney representing Jordan in show jumping, where she was also her country's flag bearer.

In 2007, Princess Haya became a member of the International Olympic Committee (IOC), and in 2010 became an appointee to the IOC's International Relations Committee, and has also served on the IOC Athletes' and Culture and Olympic Education Commissions, from 2005 to 2010.

Haya's horse racing silk: Green, sleeves chevroned green and black, green cap.

On 7 June 2008, New Approach, a three-year-old colt owned by Princess Haya, trained in Ireland by Jim Bolger and ridden by Kevin Manning, won the Derby Stakes. On 25 October 2008, her three-year-old colt, Raven's Pass, won the $5 million Breeders' Cup Classic. After being named the European champion 2-year-old in 2007 and winning the 2008 Epsom Derby, New Approach was retired at the end of the 2008 racing season. In 2009, due to her contribution to the equine world, she was made the first Patron of Retraining of Racehorses.

Princess Haya serves as president of the International Jordanian Athletes Cultural Association, which she founded to provide athletes with needed national incentive and support.

=== International Federation for Equestrian Sports (FEI) ===
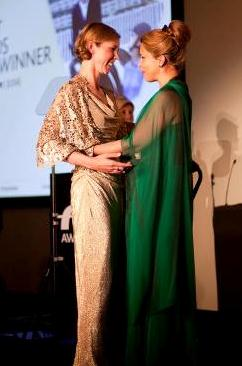
Princess Haya (right) congratulating FEI 2012 award winner Courtney King-Dye

Princess Haya participated in the 2002 FEI World Equestrian Games at Jerez de la Frontera in Spain, and represented Jordan at the FEI General Assembly on several occasions. She was elected president of the International Federation for Equestrian Sports (FEI) in 2006 for an initial four-year term in the FEI's first contested presidential race. In 2010, she became the first sitting FEI president to be challenged in a re-election bid. She succeeded, however, in winning a second and final four-year term, receiving 75 percent of the vote to soundly defeat her two European rivals. Nonetheless, during the FEI's campaign to eliminate doping and horse abuse in equestrian sport, Princess Haya's husband and stepson were both convicted by the FEI in 2009 for serious doping violations. Princess Haya ceded presidential powers to a senior colleague for the FEI disciplinary processes on the matter, officially stepping down from her position in 2014. She later complained that the issue would be used to "injure and damage the reputations of myself and my family".

Princess Haya frequently appeared, along with her husband, at Royal Ascot, the Epsom Derby and other highlights of the English equestrian calendar; both were reported to have been friendly with Queen Elizabeth II.

== Humanitarian work ==
Princess Haya is the first Arab and first woman to become Goodwill Ambassador for the United Nations World Food Programme and UN Secretary General Ban Ki-moon appointed her a UN Messenger of Peace in 2007.

She founded Tkiyet Um Ali (TUA), the first Arab NGO dedicated to overcoming local hunger, in her native Jordan, which provides food assistance and employment opportunities to thousands of poor families. In November 2012, Tkiyet Um Ali announced a campaign to quadruple the number of its beneficiaries to reach 20,000 families living under the food poverty line, aiming to meet the UN Millennium Development Goals on hunger by 2015. Tkiyet Um Ali (TUA) is intended to expand to reach all Jordanian families with insufficient income to meet basic food needs. In addition, Dar Abu Abdullah (DAA) and TUA announced a strategic partnership for a parallel jobs creation program to help TUA beneficiaries become more self-sufficient.

Princess Haya chaired Dubai's International Humanitarian City, which is the world's largest operational center for the delivery of aid, both in emergencies and for long-term development. Ten UN agencies and nearly 40 non-government organizations are members of the IHC which has supported relief efforts all over the globe, including for Syrian refugees affected by civil war, for East Africans during the last drought, in Pakistan during the 2009 floods, and to Afghanistan and Yemen. The IHC has also hosted UN and NGO staff evacuated during emergencies and civil unrest.

She was an ambassador for the World Food Programme from 2005 to 2007, and then appointed a UN Messenger of Peace in July 2007 by Secretary-general Ban Ki-moon. She was a founding member of former secretary-general Kofi Annan's Global Humanitarian Forum based in Geneva, and writes editorials and articles on hunger, nutrition and the UN Sustainable Development Goals which have appeared in the London Times, Le Figaro, the Globe and Mail, and La Repubblica. In August 2012, she supported the 2012 United Nations' World Humanitarian Day in Dubai. Under her patronage, Dubai twice hosted the Global Meeting of the World Food Programme and is increasingly a center for United Nations and regional meetings on development and humanitarian aid.

Relief and charitable programmes in Jordan also benefitted from the support of the princess's consort, Sheikh Mohammed, specifically the King Hussein Cancer Foundation, the Haya Cultural Centre and the "Reading Nation" campaign.

Princess Haya has followed in her father's footsteps in giving her support to the charitable foundation "Anything is possible", set up in the name of King Hussein to advance education for girls, including the project "The Maiden Factor", established by sailor Tracy Edwards with the relaunch of her yacht Maiden in 2018.

She is a member of the Honorary Board of the International Paralympic Committee.

== Personal life ==
On 10 April 2004, Princess Haya married Sheikh Mohammed bin Rashid Al Maktoum, the vice president and prime minister of the UAE and Ruler of Dubai, as his second and junior wife. The marriage ceremony was held at al-Baraka Palace in Amman.

On 2 December 2007 in Dubai, Princess Haya gave birth to her first child, Sheikha Al Jalila bint Mohammed bin Rashid Al Maktoum. The baby's birth coincided with the United Arab Emirates' 36th celebration of its National Day, on 2 December. On 7 January 2012, she gave birth to her second child, Sheikh Zayed bin Mohammed bin Rashid Al Maktoum.

She resides in a home in Kensington Palace Gardens. As an envoy of the Embassy of Jordan, she is able to remain in the UK and is granted diplomatic immunity and protection under the Vienna Convention on Diplomatic Relations.

=== Divorce and court proceedings ===
On 7 February 2019, Sheikh Mohammed divorced Princess Haya under Sharia law, though she was not informed at the time. The date was the twentieth anniversary of the death of her father, King Hussein of Jordan. By early 2019, Princess Haya had become suspicious of the transportation of two of her stepdaughters, Sheikha Shamsa and Sheikha Latifa, back to the United Arab Emirates,

On 15 April 2019, Princess Haya left Dubai with her children Sheikha Jalila and Sheikh Zayed to reside in the United Kingdom. The topic attracted immense media coverage all over the world. She was reported to have applied for asylum in Germany, and the British newspaper The Times reported that she had been escorted by a German diplomat to Germany. The Times reported that Sheikh Mohammed allegedly posted a poem on Instagram, in Arabic and English, accusing his wife of treachery and betrayal and also threatening her.

Some British media coverage of the divorce proceedings reported allegations that Princess Haya had formed a relationship with a member of her security team. These allegations were not the subject of any finding by the High Court.

Wardship and early proceedings

On 14 May 2019, Sheikh Mohammed commenced proceedings in England and Wales under the inherent jurisdiction of the High Court of Justice seeking orders for the children to be returned to the Emirate of Dubai. On 30 July 2019 at the High Court, Princess Haya issued applications for the children to be made Wards of Court, and for a forced marriage protection order (FMPO) with respect to Sheikha Jalila, and for a non-molestation order for her own protection. All of the orders were granted.

On 11 December 2019, in the High Court of Justice Family Division, Royal Courts of Justice, London, the Rt Hon Sir Andrew McFarlane, President of the Family Division, said he would "evaluate the risk of either or both of the children being removed from their mother's care and taken to Dubai against her will".

Findings of the High Court

On 5 March 2020, the High Court found, on the balance of probabilities, that Sheikh Mohammed had orchestrated the abductions of two of his other children. The judge accepted the allegations that in 2000 Mohammed ordered the unlawful abduction of his daughter Sheikha Shamsa from the United Kingdom to Dubai. On two occasions, in 2002 and 2018, Mohammed ordered and orchestrated the forcible return of his daughter Sheikha Latifa to the family home in Dubai. In 2002, the return was from the border of Dubai with Oman, and in 2018 it was by an armed commando assault at sea near the coast of India. Sheikha Shamsa and Sheikha Latifa were, following their return to the custody of their father's family, allegedly deprived of their liberty. The judge also found allegations of physical abuse amounting to torture, previously made by Sheikha Latifa in a video, to be credible.

The High Court also accepted that Sheikh Mohammed had conducted a campaign, by various means, with the aim of harassing, intimidating or otherwise putting Princess Haya in great fear from the end of 2018. Princess Haya was subjected to intimidation and abuse, including having a gun placed on her pillow twice and threats to be taken to a remote prison.

Early in the court proceedings, Sir Andrew McFarlane described the sheikh as "a man of international prominence whose position and international standing justify a high level of respect". In March, writers for The Guardian reflected upon that contextualisation, commenting: "After McFarlane's explosive conclusions, it is unclear whether his flattering description still holds."

On 6 October 2021, the High Court found that agents of Sheikh Mohammed used the Pegasus spyware to hack the phones of Princess Haya, her solicitors including Baroness Fiona Shackleton, a personal assistant and two members of her security team in the summer of 2020 "with the express or implied authority" of the sheikh. The spyware's developer, NSO Group, itself had contacted an intermediary in August 2020 to inform Princess Haya of the hacking, of which Sheikh Mohammed denied knowledge. The judgment referred to the hacking as "serial breaches of (UK) domestic criminal law", "in violation of fundamental common law and ECHR rights", "interference with the process of this court and the mother's access to justice" and "abuse of power" by a head of state. It was also revealed that Sheikh Mohammed attempted to purchase a property near to Princess Haya's home, that "if anyone chose to use it, it is in prime position for direct or electronic surveillance". Princess Haya told the court: "It feels as if I am being stalked, that there is literally nowhere for me to go to be safe from [Sheikh Mohammed], or those acting in his interests. It is hugely oppressive."

On 21 December 2021, Princess Haya was granted full custody of her children. The High Court ordered Sheikh Mohammed to pay a lump sum settlement of £251.5 million to Princess Haya in addition to £5.6 million-a-year for each of their two children and an upfront payment of £290 million as guarantee. The sheikh also removed an online poem, titled "You lived, You Died", which had been perceived as a threat by Princess Haya. In March 2022, the High Court declared that Princess Haya had been a victim of "domestic abuse", and she was announced as the sole person in charge of the children's schooling and medical care. Sir Andrew McFarlane said Sheikh Mohammed "consistently displayed coercive and controlling behaviour" against family members who went against his will.

== Honours and awards ==
=== Honours ===
National

- Jordan: Grand Cordon with Brilliants of the Supreme Order of the Renaissance, Jordan, 30 January 2006.

Foreign

- France: Officer of the Legion of Honour, France, 26 September 2014.

=== Awards ===
- 2015 Hunger Hero Award, United Nations World Food Programme, Davos, Switzerland, 22 January 2015.
