= Humaid bin Abdulaziz Al Nuaimi =

- Sheikh

Ruler of Ajman
- Reign: 1910–1928
- Predecessor: Abdulaziz bin Humaid Al Nuaimi
- Successor: Rashid bin Humaid Al Nuaimi III
- Died: 1928
- House: Al Nuaimi

Humaid bin Abdulaziz Al Nuaimi was Ruler of Ajman, one of the Trucial States which today form the United Arab Emirates (UAE), from 1910 to 1928. His rule was marked by a running conflict with the Al Bu Shamis and their charismatic Sheikh, Abdulrahman bin Muhammad Al Shamsi.

== Accession ==
Humaid bin Abdulaziz was travelling in Muscat when he received the news of his father's death in an attempted coup and rushed back to Ajman to consolidate his position as the next Ruler of the emirate, forcing the leader of the coup, his cousin Mohammed bin Rashid Al Nuaimi, to flee for his life.

One of Humaid's first acts once he had established himself was to respond to a rather snooty letter from the British Resident to all of the Trucial Sheikhs, warning them not to undertake any concession for pearls or sponges with any foreign agent. To this, Humaid responded 'We have been obedient to your order and, God willing, we shall do nothing contrary to your view.' It was a sentiment which was not to last.

== Ajman fort taken ==
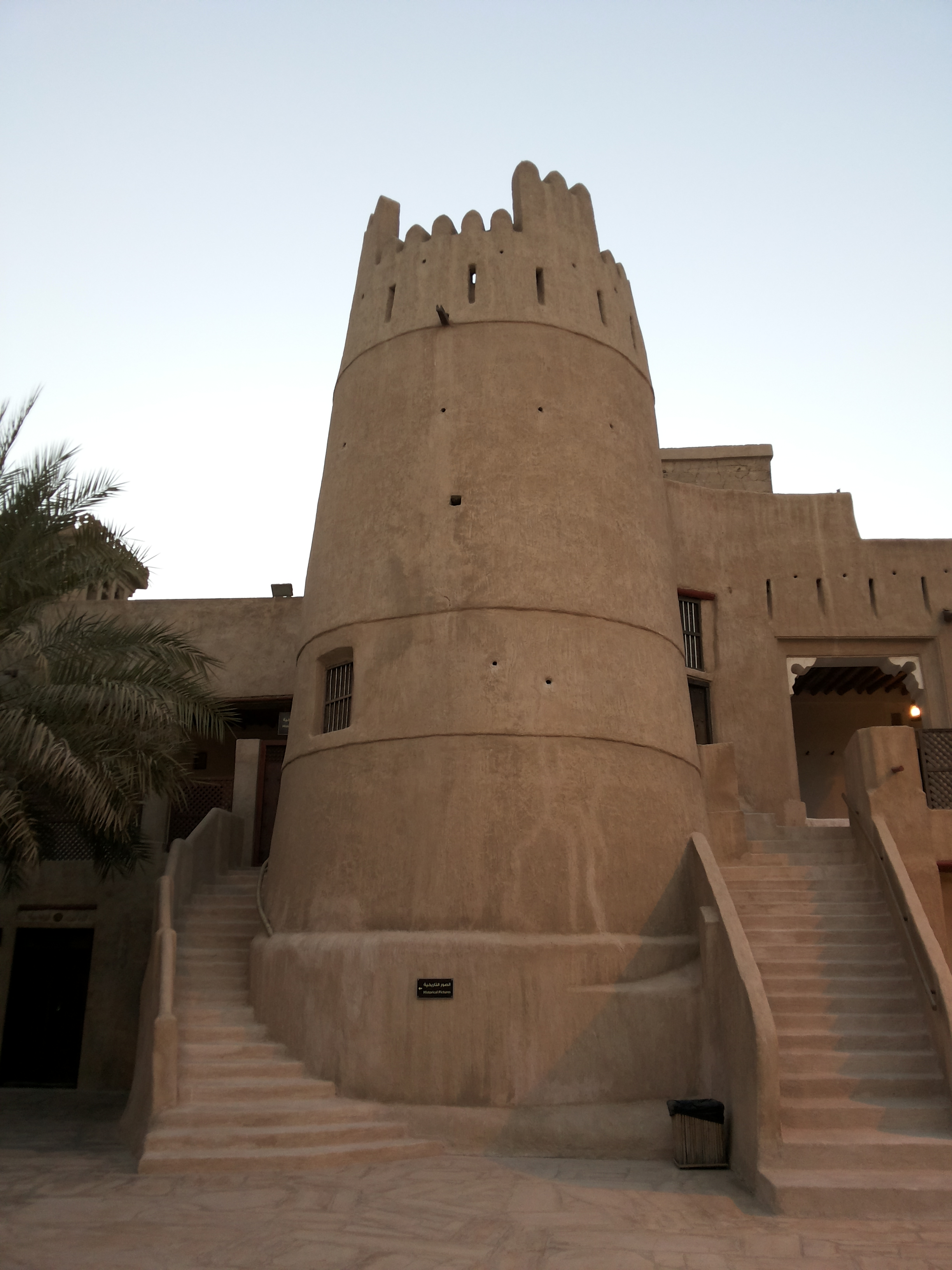
Ajman Fort

In June 1920, the head of the Na'im Al Bu Shamis tribe (which the Na'im Al Bu Khuraiban had originally displaced when they first settled Ajman in 1816), Abdulrahman bin Muhammad Al Shamsi of Al Heera, seized the fort of Ajman and was only removed after the intercession of the British Residency Agent.

Khalid bin Ahmed Al Qasimi of Sharjah raised a force together with Humaid bin Abdulaziz and they attacked Abdulrahman in Heera. Again, the British intervened and an agreement was made that recognised Abdulrahman as a subject of Khalid's and bound him to cause no further trouble.

At the time Al Heera was quite a large coastal pearling village of about 250 houses. Abdul Rahman was promised safe passage by the British residency agent as he owed money to a number of British subjects but was prevented from returning to Al Heera by Humaid bin Abdulaziz. After spending time in Ru'us Al Jibal (in Oman) and Al Khan (Southern Sharjah), Abdulrahman was allowed to return to Al Heera by the ruler of Sharjah in 1921 in a settlement at least partly enforced by the presence of the British ship HMS Triad under Captain John Pearson. This annoyed Humaid bin Abdulaziz, who gained nothing by it.

== British relationship ==
Irritated by their constant mediation over the Al Heera affair, Humaid defied the British in the matter of a manumission certificate which he had allegedly torn up. Refusing to come on board a British ship to meet with the resident and also refusing to pay a 1,000 Rupee fine levied on him, he was finally threatened with bombardment, HMS Crocus and HMS Cyclamen both being offshore at the time. Humaid pointed out to the British that it would 'be the worse for them' if they dared to bombard his fort and they commenced fire. With one tower of the fort totally demolished and a second crumbling under cannon fire, Humaid paid the fine.

In early 1922, along with the other Trucial Sheikhs, Humaid signed an agreement with the British that any oil concessions would be granted only to a British government appointee. However, no such concession was signed during his rule.

== Coup in Sharjah ==
In January 1924, a further attack on Heera was planned by Humaid and Khalid bin Ahmed and forces from Sharjah surrounded Al Heera. Humaid was bound over not to take part in the action by the British Residency Agent and a truce was forged. Abdulrahman was forced into exile, joining his dispossessed son-in-law, Sultan bin Saqr Al Qasimi II, in Dubai. This final movement against Al Heera was too much for the people of Sharjah, however, and they called on Sultan bin Saqr to return and depose Khalid bin Ahmed, which they did, taking Sharjah after an 11-day battle in November 1924. This ensured that Humaid's implacable foe Abdulrahman was now allied to the powerful ruler of Sharjah.

Humaid was pleased when, in 1926, the British decided to exile Abulrahman of Al Heera to Aden for four years. He was, in fact, allowed back early but too late for Humaid, who died in 1928, being succeeded by Sheikh Rashid bin Humaid Al Nuaimi III.
