= Al Bu Kharaiban =

Bedouin tribe of the United Arab Emirates

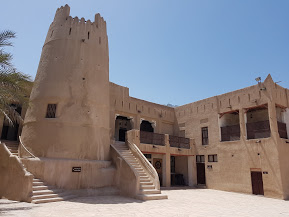
Ajman Fort, the seat of power of the Rulers of Ajman until 1967, when it became a police station. The Rulers of Ajman since its establishment in 1820 have been members of the Al Bu Kharabain subsection of the Na'im tribe.

The Al Bu Kharaiban is an Arab tribe of the United Arab Emirates, a subsection of the Na'im and the tribe from which the Rulers of the Emirate of Ajman are drawn.

== Origins ==
Lorimer, in his 1908 Gazeteer of the Persian Gulf, recorded some 140 Al Bu Kharabian living in Hafit village near Buraimi, noting they were semi-settled, cultivating dates in the summer and roaming to find pasture for their flocks in the winter. He also observed some 700 Al Bu Kharaiban in Ajman town and a further 90 townsfolk and 90 Bedouin at Hamriyah (today a part of Sharjah). He also notes a number of Al Bu Kharaiban in Buraimi village itself, as well as in Su'arah in the Buraimi Oasis, and that it is from these members of the tribe that the Ruler of Ajman was drawn. Lorimer identifies the Na'im in general as 'the most powerful Ghafiri tribe in the Dhahirah district of the Oman Sultanate' and identifies Ajman and Hamriyah as particular strongholds of the tribe, whose Bedouin he describes as 'warlike and predatory.'

== Buraimi ==
The Na'im in Buraimi (including the Khawatir and Al Bu Shamis) were led by the Al Bu Kharaiban and were originally loyal to Shakhbut bin Khalifa of Abu Dhabi, and would be again to Zayed bin Khalifa Al Nahyan, but their relationship with the Al Bu Falah was often fractious and, resentful of the encroachment of the Al Bu Falah and their allies the Manasir in the mid-late C19th, adopted Wahhabism as a doctrine. Following the Saudi withdrawal in 1871, they submitted to Muscat. Holding the fort in Buraimi, the tribe was powerful in that area but would rally behind Zayed bin Khalifa both there and in Hatta, where they asked for his support in interceding in a conflict with the Bani Qitab in 1905. The village neighbouring Hatta, Masfout, was originally dependent on the Na'im of Buraimi but fell to the Al Bu Kharaiban ruler of Ajman, Rashid bin Humaid III, in 1948.

== Ajman ==
Al Bu Kharaiban Nuaimi rule in Ajman effectively began with Sheikh Rashid bin Humaid Al Nuaimi who, with some fifty followers, took control of the coastal settlement of Ajman from members of the Al Bu Shamis Nuaimi in a short conflict. This was sealed in 1816/17 by the taking of the fort by Rashid, who was to be a signatory of the 1820 General Maritime Treaty with the British. Faction fighting between the Na'im subsections wasn't limited to Masfout, however, and with the continuing decline of the larger Na'im tribal federation beyond Buraimi, the Al Bu Shamis maintained an almost completely separate identity and, in fact, the Al Bu Shamis leader of Al Heera – Sheikh Abdulrahman bin Muhammad Al Shamsi was often at loggerheads, if not war, with the Al Bu Kharaiban Ruler of Ajman.
