= Al Bu Shamis =

Bedouin tribe of the United Arab Emirates

- Arab tribe
- Ethnicity: Arab
- Location: Oman, United Arab Emirates
- Language: Arabic
- Religion: Islam
- Surnames: Al-Shamsi

The Al Bu Shamis (Arabic: آل بو شامس) singular Al Shamsi (Arabic: الشامسي) is an Arab tribe of the United Arab Emirates, also evident in northern Oman.

== Origins ==
The Al Bu Shamis are one of three sections of the Na'im, the others being Al Bu Kharaiban and Khawatir. Of the three sections, the Al Bu Shamis, during the broader fragmentation of the Na'im, has become virtually independent and associated closely with the ruling Al Bu Falah of Abu Dhabi. Originally forming the Bedouin component of the Na'im, the Al Bu Shamis retained a predominantly nomadic character into the 1950s when their population was estimated at 1,000 individuals, including around 400 armed men. At that time leadership of the Bedouin Al Bu Shamis was held by Muhammad bin Salmin bin Rahmah, who resided at either Sunaynah or Qabil, south of the Buraimi Oasis. In accordance with practices common among some Bedouin tribes of Oman authority was exercised jointly with other, usually related leaders; in this case his cousins Mani and Hamad bin Ali bin Rahmah.

The Al Bu Shamis emigrated in Eastern Arabia to settle around the Dhahirah and Sunaynah areas. Later migrations led some of them to Al Ain and the Buraimi Oasis. Although smaller in number, the settled Al Bu Shamis occupied strategically significant oases and coastal settlements and their local leaders were regarded as prominent figures. Some members of the tribe owned land in Dhank, while others under the leadership of Shaikh Rashid bin Hamad Al Shamsi resided in Hamasa. The Al Bu Shamis were also traditionally the headmen of the substantial proportion of the populations in Hamriyah and Al Heera, both dependencies of Sharjah that frequently attempted to assert their independence through the 19th and into the 20th century. The Al Bu Shamis are believed to have settled along the coast after being temporarily displaced from Dhahirah in the early 19th century.

While the Na'im were often involved in disputes and open warfare with other tribes, including the Bani Kaab, Bani Qitab and Al Bu Falah, the Al Bu Shamis remained generally on good terms with other tribes, particularly the Duru and Bani Qitab. In contrast, the Al Bu Shamis although belonging to the Ghafiri faction like the rest of the Na'im, developed a close alliance with the Al Bu Falah. This relationship may have originated from the assistance provided by Shaikh Tahnun bin Shakhbut in helping the Al Bu Shamis regain control of Qabil and Sunaynah in Dhahirah at some point prior to 1833.

The Na'im, including the Al Bu Shamis, settled Buraimi and nearby Al Ain, where Na'im expansion came at the expense of the Dhawahir tribe, but also rubbed up against the Bani Yas and the allied Manasir. The Na'im as a whole were led by the Sheikh of the Al Bu Kharaiban. Although the Na'im were linked to the growing Wahhabi influence in the Buraimi area and adopted the doctrine, they allied with other forces to evict the Wahhabis from Buraimi in 1871 and subsequently occupied many of the forts around Buraimi. However, following the death of Zayed the Great, the Na'im once again were aligned with Muscat but in the 1930s and 40s came under Saudi influence. As with other sections of the Na'im, the sovereignty of the Sultan was generally acknowledged insofar as it involved customary taxation on agricultural produce but it otherwise entailed limited reciprocal obligations. The allocation of petroleum concessions enhanced the negotiating leverage of leaders of the largely autonomous tribal sections. According to contemporary accounts, the leader of the Bedouin Al Bu Shamis is alleged to have visited the Sultan in Muscat around 1948 and offered the complete loyalty of his followers in exchange for 10,000 Maria Theresa dollars. The proposal was reportedly declined although the Sultan is said to have presented the shaikh with a considerably smaller sum as a gift.

With the continuing decline of the Na'im tribal federation, the Al Bu Shamis maintained an almost completely separate identity and, in fact, the Al Bu Shamis leader of Al Heera – Sheikh Abdulrahman bin Muhammad Al Shamsi was often at loggerheads, if not war, with the Na'imi Al Bu Kharaiban Ruler of Ajman.

With Saudi interests focused on Buraimi in the late 1940s, together with the Bani Kaab, the Al Bu Shamis were ranged against British forces during the Buraimi Dispute and actively fought the British forces. As a consequence, a number of members of the tribe elected to be deported to Bahrain and then on to live in Saudi Arabia, while the majority chose to settle in the Al Ain region of Abu Dhabi and the Omani Governorate of Al Buraimi.

== Notable members ==
Sheikh Zayed bin Sultan, the founder of the United Arab Emirates, was married to Alia, the daughter of Muhammed bin Salmin bin Rahmah, the Sheikh of the Bedouin Al Bu Shamis. The owner of the Dubai-based. fashion retail organization Al Shamsi holdings is Ali Saeed Al-Shamsi.

Other notable people include:

- Abdulrahman bin Muhammad Al Shamsi – Former ruler of Al Heera.
- Saeed Mohammed Al Shamsi – UAE Diplomat and Ambassador to Australia Saeed Mohammed Al Shamsi
- Taryam Omran Taryam Al Shamsi – co-founder of Al Khaleej and Gulf Today newspapers
- Abdulaziz Nasser Al Shamsi – Protocol of the UAE Ministry of Foreign Affairs Abdulaziz Nasser Al Shamsi
- Ahlam (singer)
- Sultan Al-Shamsi - Emirati footballer who won the Asian champions league with Al Ain club.
- Mohamed Al-Shamsi - Emirati footballer
- Alia Al Shamsi - Emirati author and poet
- Mohammed Ahmad S Al-Shamsi - Saudi Arabian professor and inventor
- Saeed Mohammed Al Shamsi - Emirati lawyer
- Ahmed Abdulla Al Shamisi - Emirati footballer
- Amna Al Shamsi - Emirati politician serving as the Minister of Climate Change and Environment
- Khalfan Mubarak Al Shamsi - International Emirati soccer player
