= Abdulrahman bin Muhammad Al Shamsi =

Abdulrahman bin Muhammad Al Shamsi was the Sheikh, or head man, of the township of Al Heera, today a suburb of Sharjah in the United Arab Emirates. A highly influential and often divisive figure in regional politics during the early 20th century in the Trucial States, he was referred to by one British Political Resident as ‘a stormy petrel of the Trucial Coast, a man feared by everyone in and around Sharjah’.

Frequently at odds with other rulers of communities in the Trucial Coast, he was also often in trouble with the British administration. However, he was also instrumental in concluding negotiations between the British and the Ruler of Sharjah, Sultan bin Saqr Al Qasimi, for the establishment of an airport in Sharjah and the construction of the associated Mahatta Fort.

== Al Heera ==
Al Heera, in common with the community at Hamriyah, to the north of Ajman, was populated by members of the Al Bu Shamis tribe (Singular Al Shamsi), a subsection of the Darawishah Na’im. It found its first mention in British records in 1830, with the note: "The people of Heera, a Joasmee dependency, commit a piracy upon a Bundar Abbas boat. Sheikh Sultan bin Suggur of his own accord compels full restitution of the property and punishes the perpetrators."

In 1840, the then-ruler of the town, Sheikh Humeid bin Obeid bin Saeed Al Shamsi, invaded the neighbouring emirate of Ajman and was eventually ousted by a joint force from Sharjah and Dubai, which went on to burn Al Heera in retaliation. The action reflected a long-standing grievance between the Al Bu Shamis and the Al Bu Kharaiban Na'im of Ajman.

In 1906, Al Heera had a small and active pearling fleet of 25 boats (each would have required a crew of some 18 men) and 10 fishing boats. Date groves stretched inland with 2,500 trees, and the populace kept herds of livestock and even sustained a few shops. The town, consisting of some 250 houses in all, was watered by relatively shallow wells and defended by a number of towers.

By 1920, Al Heera was a township, nominally under the control of Sharjah but – like Hamriyah – given to asserting its independence. Beset by a number of poor pearling seasons – and the pearling banks of the Persian Gulf being massively over-fished – Abdulrahman Al Shamsi, as the head man of Al Heera, was responsible for maintaining the livelihoods of his town's pearling fleet. He fell into debt, owing some Rs 21,560. This was a sum almost equivalent to the entire subscription raised by the town of Dubai that year for the maintenance of its ruling family and the tribes and others to whom Dubai paid subsidies. To bear a debt equivalent to the running costs of Dubai illustrated how deeply in trouble Al Shamsi was, for a man who commanded a small fleet of 25 pearling boats.

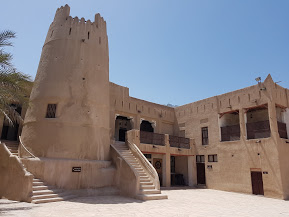
Ajman Fort. The fort was invaded and taken by Al Shamsi's forces in June 1920.

== Invasion of Ajman ==
In an act of desperation, Al Shamsi raised a force which headed north and attacked Ajman and its fort on 15 June 1920, towards the end of Ramadan that year. The Ruler of Ajman, Humaid bin Abdulaziz Al Nuaimi was forced to flee and the town's souq was set aflame. Al Shamsi and his men occupied the fort for six days.

Al Shamsi's occupation of the fort was terminated following the involvement of the British Residency Agent acting together with Khalid bin Ahmed Al Qasimi of Sharjah. Khalid subsequently raised a force, with Humaid bin Abdulaziz Al Nuaimi, to attack Al Shamsi in Al Heera. The British once again intervened and an agreement recognised Al Shamsi as a subject of Sharjah's ruler, binding him over to cause no further trouble.

Irritated by British interference in the Al Heera affair, Humaid bin Abdulaziz defied the British, and was alleged to have torn up a slave's manumission certificate - seen at the time as a great offence against British standing. Refusing a request to come on board ship to meet with the British Resident and also refusing to pay a 1,000 rupee fine levied on him, he was finally threatened with bombardment, HMS Crocus and HMS Cyclamen both Arabis-class sloops being offshore at the time. In an act of further defiance, Humaid threatened the British that it would "be the worse for them" if they dared to bombard his fort. The subsequent bombardment reduced the fort and, with one of its great towers totally demolished and a second crumbling under blistering cannon fire, Humaid sued for peace and paid the fine. The incident sealed the enmity of the Ruler of Ajman towards Al Shamsi.

== First exile ==
Al Shamsi fled the retribution of Ajman, taking refuge with the Shihuh of the Rus Al Jibal, the mountains inland of Ras Al Khaimah. However, his enormous debts were mostly owed to Indian merchants, who were British subjects. The British Residency Agent, Isa bin Abdullatif Al Serkal, acted in their interests, backed by the Political Resident in Bushire, in offering Al Shamsi asylum at the Residency Agent's house in Sharjah. The Political Resident also intervened with Humaid bin Abdulaziz Al Nuaimi, requesting Abdulrahman be allowed to attempt to repay his debts by settling in Al Khan, to the south of Sharjah town and far away from Ajman's border. This arrangement would have allowed him to take to the sea with his fleet from Al Heera for the 1921 pearling season.

Having failed to gain a foothold in Bahrain's more lively pearling business, Al Shamsi returned to Dubai in December 1920, where his subjects from Al Heera visited him and requested his return. He then returned to Al Heera in contravention of his agreement and found himself facing the combined wrath of both Ajman and Sharjah. The British, mindful of Al Shamsi's debts owed to their subjects, sent HMS Triad to enforce a peace between Al Shamsi, Sharjah and Ajman.

A truce was signed on 8 January 1921, Abdulrahman agreeing to quit Al Heera for Sharjah for a period of one month and not to cause trouble. Khalid bin Ahmad of Sharjah agreed to act as guarantor for Abdulrahman, now pledged to be a subject of Sharjah.

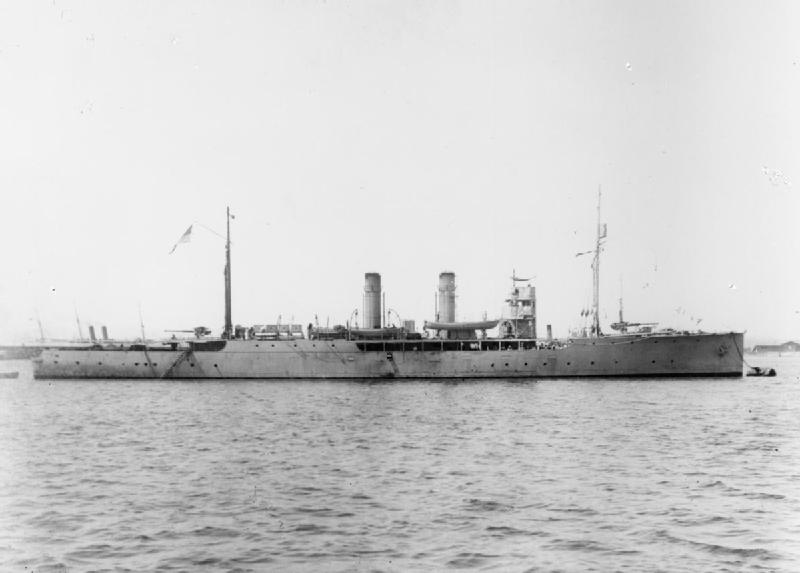
An Arabis-class sloop, similar to HMS Cyclamen

== War for Sharjah ==
Khalid bin Ahmad Al Qasimi of Sharjah had succeeded as Ruler of Sharjah and Ras Al Khaimah in 1914, when his cousin, Saqr bin Khalid Al Qasimi, died. Saqr bin Khalid's young son, Sultan bin Saqr Al Qasimi, was in his minority at the time. He remained in Sharjah and Khalid acted against the young man, dispossessing him and eventually forcing him into exile in Dubai, in the face of the disapproval of the prominent families of Sharjah. By the time of Al Shamsi's conflicts with Ajman and Khalid bin Ahmad, Khalid was becoming increasingly unpopular, particularly over the expense of maintaining his rule over turbulent Al Heera and the resulting levies on the pearling fleet of Sharjah. In 1923, Sultan bin Saqr married while in exile in Dubai, his new bride being Abdulrahman Al Shamsi's daughter. Another of Al Shamsi's daughters married Sultan's brother.

Khalid bin Ahmad Al Qasimi, angry at the match between Al Shamsi and a young man he saw as a potential usurper, moved against Al Heera and was pushed back by Al Shamsi's forces. The conflict escalated until the British Resident, Arthur Trevor, brokered a peace between Khalid bin Ahmed and Al Shamsi, who was forced to leave Al Heera and head for Dubai and the house of his son-in-law. This final movement against Al Heera was too much for the people of Sharjah, however, and they called on Sultan bin Saqr Al Qasimi to return and depose Khalid bin Ahmed. Abdulrahman enjoyed considerable influence among and backing from the Bedouin tribes of the interior, particularly the warlike Manasir and Bani Qitab and his backing was crucial to Sultan's action against Khalid bin Ahmed to take control of Sharjah. The force under Sultan moved north, taking Sharjah after 11 days of house-to-house conflict in November 1924.

Now exiled himself, Khalid took refuge first in Dubai and then Umm Al Quwain. He was to become Sheikh of the inland town of Dhaid and also the east coast town of Kalba before his death in 1950.

== Second exile ==
On 11 October 1925, Ibrahim bin Rajab, the cousin of the British Residency Agent in Sharjah, Isa Bin Abdullatif Al Serkal, was killed by a shot fired from the dense alleys of Sharjah. It was believed attack was aimed at the agent himself. Stuart Horner, secretary to the Political Resident, travelled on HMS Cyclamen to Sharjah to investigate, together with the Bahraini trader, Yousuf bin Ahmed Kanoo. The evidence presented to Horner was flimsy, including a woman who saw a freed slave linked to Al Shamsi holding a gun near to where the shooting had taken place. No trial was held.

After deliberations, and under increasing pressure to show clemency from the Trucial Rulers as well as the heads of the Al Bu Shamis, it was decided that Al Shamsi would be exiled to Aden for a period of four years (Karachi for five was the original suggestion of the Political Resident, Francis Prideaux). The British duly once again sent HMS Triad and the sloop HMS Cyclamen to Ras Al Khaimah, where the Ruler, Sultan bin Salim refused to give up Abdulrahman ‘for fear of consequences to himself’. He eventually complied and Al Shamsi was sent onto Bombay and then to a four-year exile in Yemen, although he returned after three years following Sultan bin Saqr's petitioning of the British and offer of a guarantee of good behaviour .

The sum of 800 rupees was to be paid by Sharjah to the family of the agent's cousin and a fine of 3,000 rupees was to be paid to the government of India ‘on account of the outrage’.

Al Shamsi's early return from exile was not to result in peace and stability, however. He almost immediately came to blows with the British Residency Agent, Isa bin Abdullatif Al Serkal. This time – on the evening of 31 January 1931 – three slaves belonging to Abdulrahman had taken refuge in the British Residency in Sharjah, seeking their manumission (release). Al Shamsi and 100 armed men had surrounded the Residency and Isa bin Abdullatif Al Serkal was forced to take refuge in Kalba until a British ship could be brought to Sharjah in his support. Sultan bin Saqr was given two options: surrender Abdulrahman to be exiled or pay Rs 2,000 and give up 100 good rifles. Sultan chose the latter, very expensive, option and Al Shamsi retained his freedom.

== Negotiations for Sharjah Airport ==
Telegram announcing the death of Abdulrahman bin Muhammad Al Shamsi of Al Heera

The Imperial Airways Empire Route was originally established on the Northern Shore of the Persian Gulf, with Imperial Airways seaplanes landing off Hengam Island, but the agreement to use the route made with the Persian Government lapsed in 1932 when the Persian Government attempted to use the continuation of rights to the facility as leverage to gain British recognition for the Persian claim to the Tunbs Islands – a claim the British refused to countenance. As a consequence, a Southern route was sought.

Negotiations with several Trucial Sheikhs resulted in British offers to establish an airport (originally seeking only landing rights for seaplanes) being rejected. Eventually a location outside the coastal town of Sharjah was selected. Sultan bin Saqr Al Qasimi agreed – with reservations – to host the airfield.

An agreement was made on 22 June 1932 with Sultan bin Saqr, which secured him a monthly rental of 800 rupees for landing rights and fees and a personal subsidy of 500 rupees. Concerned that the airfield would result in British interference in Sharjah's internal affairs, Sultan bin Saqr also gained assurances that British steam ships would come ashore at Sharjah, providing income for the town's traders.

The fraught negotiations between the British and Sultan bin Saqr were briefly interrupted when the British resident in the Persian Gulf, Hugh Biscoe, suffered a heart attack and died at sea en route to Sharjah.

Local resistance to the idea of an airport in Sharjah was fierce and Sultan bin Saqr found himself fighting violent opposition to the scheme, even as he was trying to negotiate its conclusion. He played an ace card, bringing Al Shamsi to the negotiations to argue Sultan's case to those who opposed the scheme. According to Captain Crabbe, the Senior Naval Officer for the Persian Gulf in his summary of the affair, Sultan bin Saqr ‘played a master stroke by introducing Abdulrahman into the discussions’.

== Death ==
Abdulrahman Al Shamsi ruled Al Heera until his death on 10 August 1942, when the township reverted to rule by Sharjah.
