= Ain Al Nuaman =

Ain Al Nuaman عين النعمان
- Village
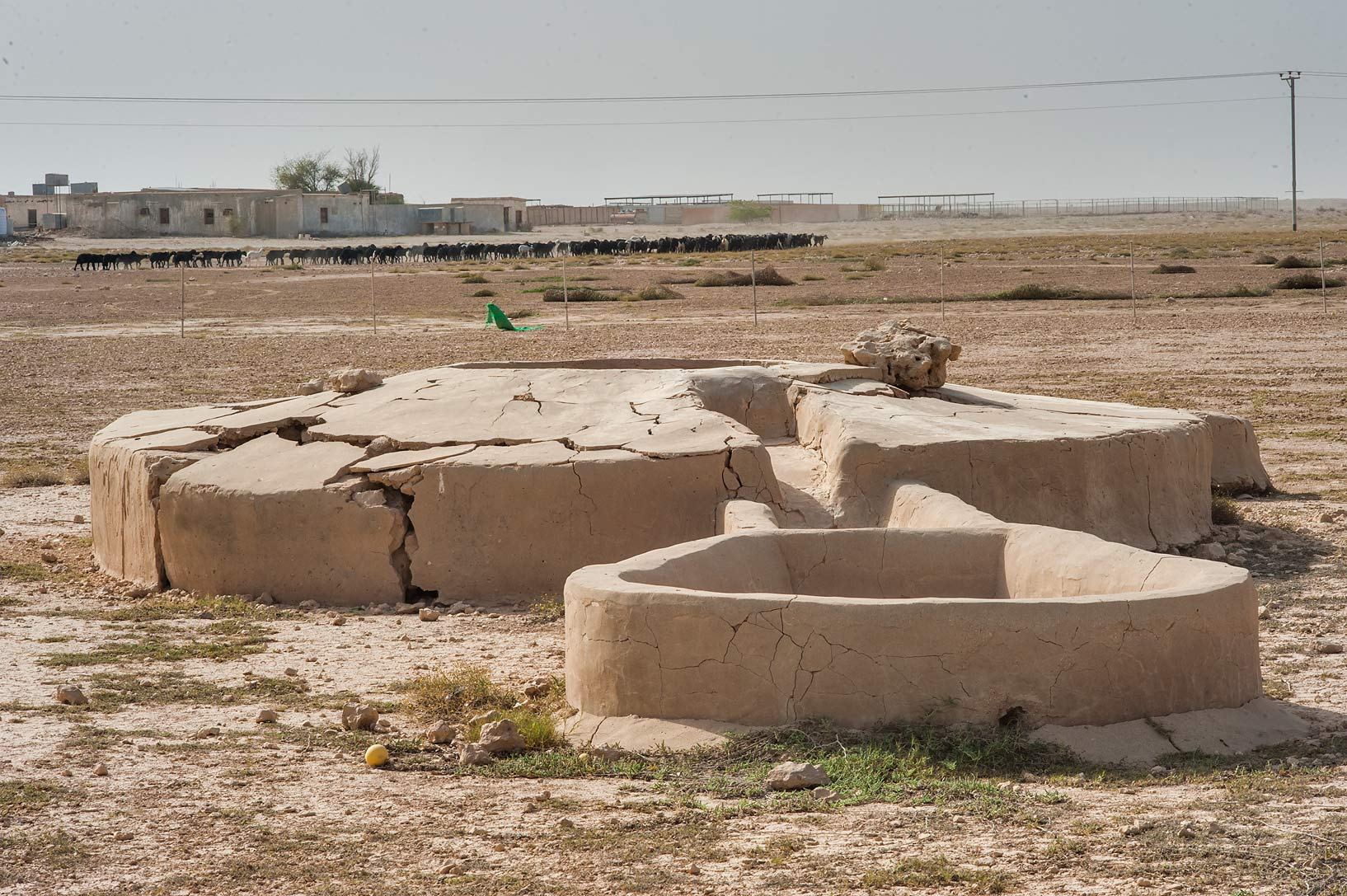
- The original Ain Al Nuaman Well constructed by the Na'im tribe

- Location in Qatar
- Coordinates: 25°51′24″N 51°05′00″E
- Country: Qatar
- Municipality: Al Shamal
- Zone: Zone 78
- District no.: 421

Area
  - Total: 11.2 sq mi (28.9 km^{2})

Ain Al Nuaman (Arabic: عين النعمان, romanized: ‘Ain An Nu‘mān) is a village in north-west Qatar, in the municipality of Ash Shamal. It is roughly 91 km (57 mi) away from the capital Doha, and is close to the ruins of Zubarah. Largely an agricultural settlement, the area is characterized by its large concentration of farms and gardens, with little else in the way of public infrastructure. According to the Ministry of Environment, there were about six households in the village in 2014.

== Etymology ==
Named after a local well, the first constituent of the village's name, ʿayn, refers to a natural source of water in Arabic. The second part, Nuaman, refers to the Na'im tribe, which is the family name of the individual who built the well which supplied water to the village. Another variant of the name is Ain Al Noman.

== History ==
Based on field work carried out by anthropologists in Qatar in the 1950s, the main tribe in the area of Al Suwaihliya were the Al Ramzan branch of the Na'im tribe.

== Infrastructure ==
The condition of the roads in the village is poor. Currently, only a one-lane road runs through the village center and does not have adequate lighting. There is also a marked absence of commercial establishments in the village.

Constructed in 1946, the Al Nuaman Mosque is considered a local historical landmark and has undergone preservation efforts by Qatar Museums.

== Gallery ==
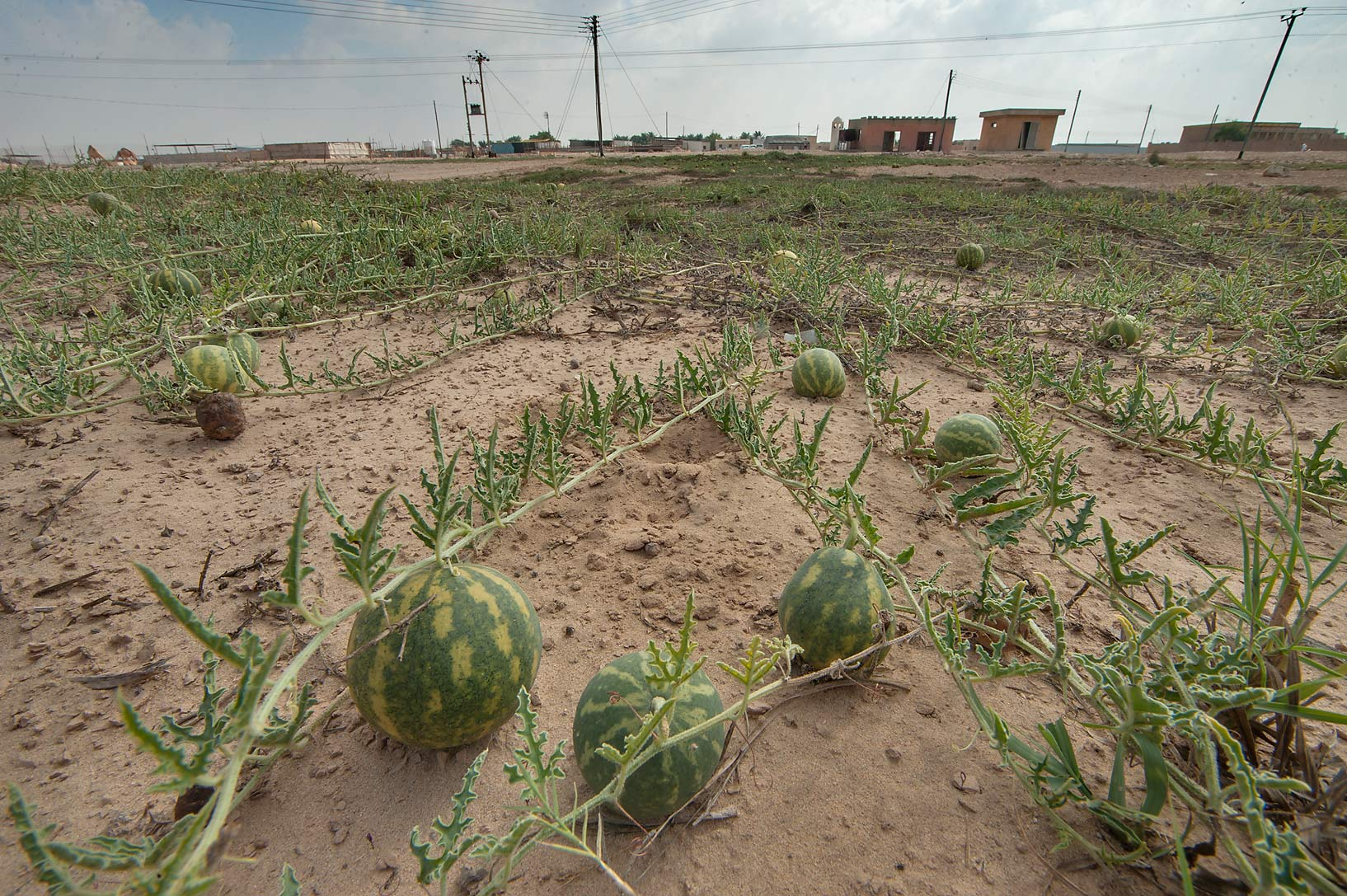
Desert gourds (Citrullus colocynthis) growing in Ain Al Nuaman

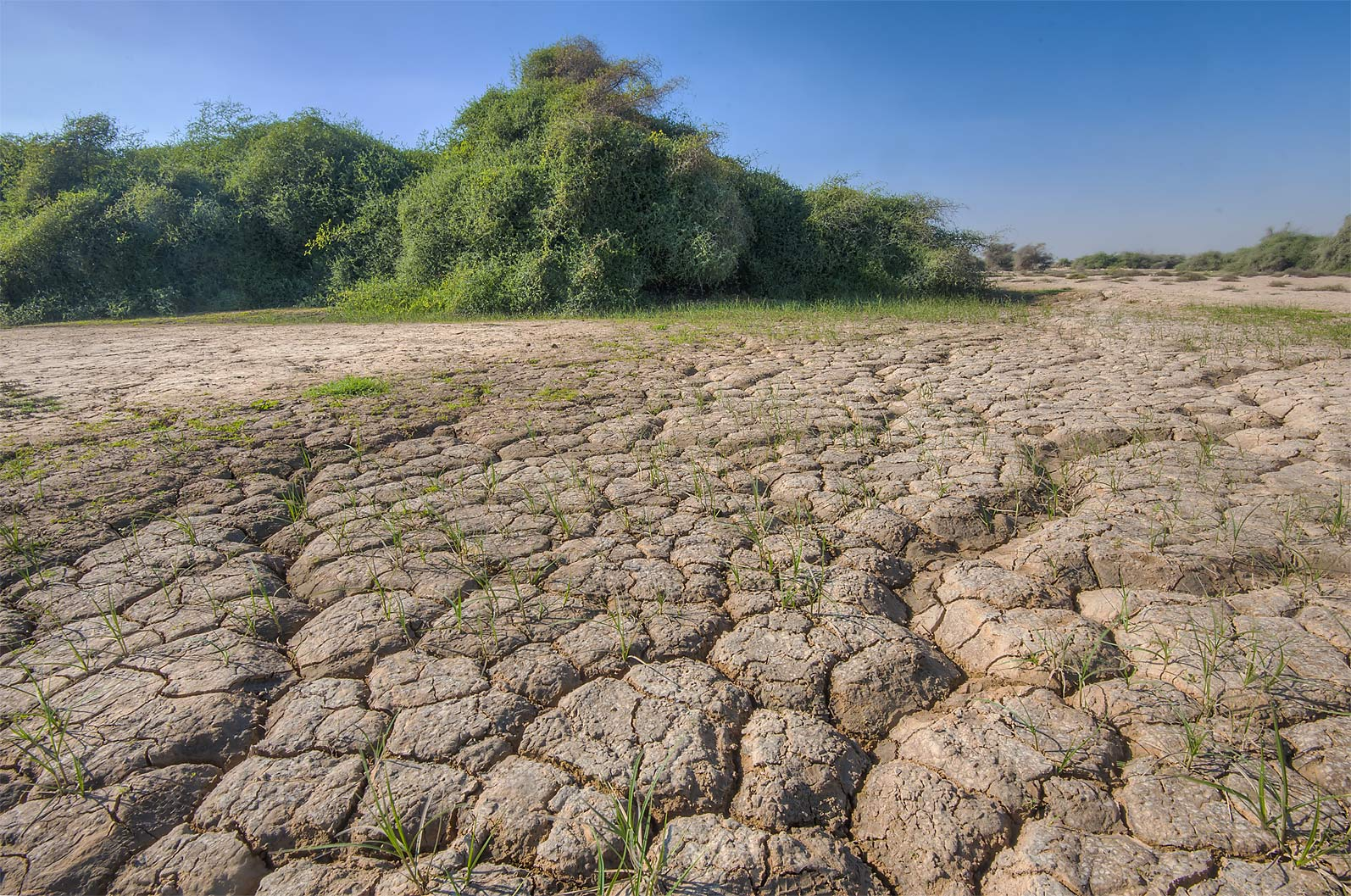
Silty depression near Ain Al Nuaman

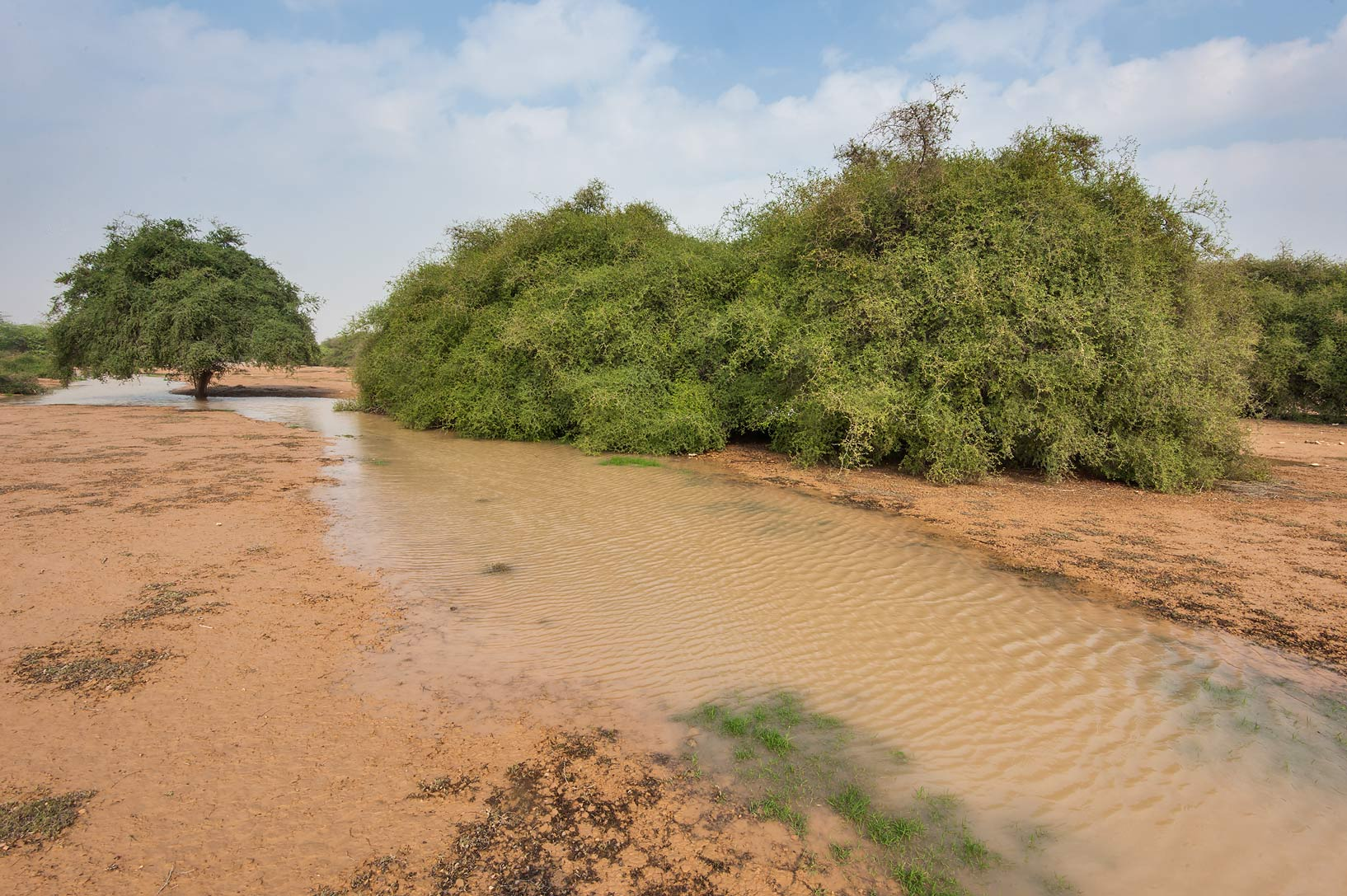
Ephemeral stream (jeri) in silty depression in Ain Al Nuaman

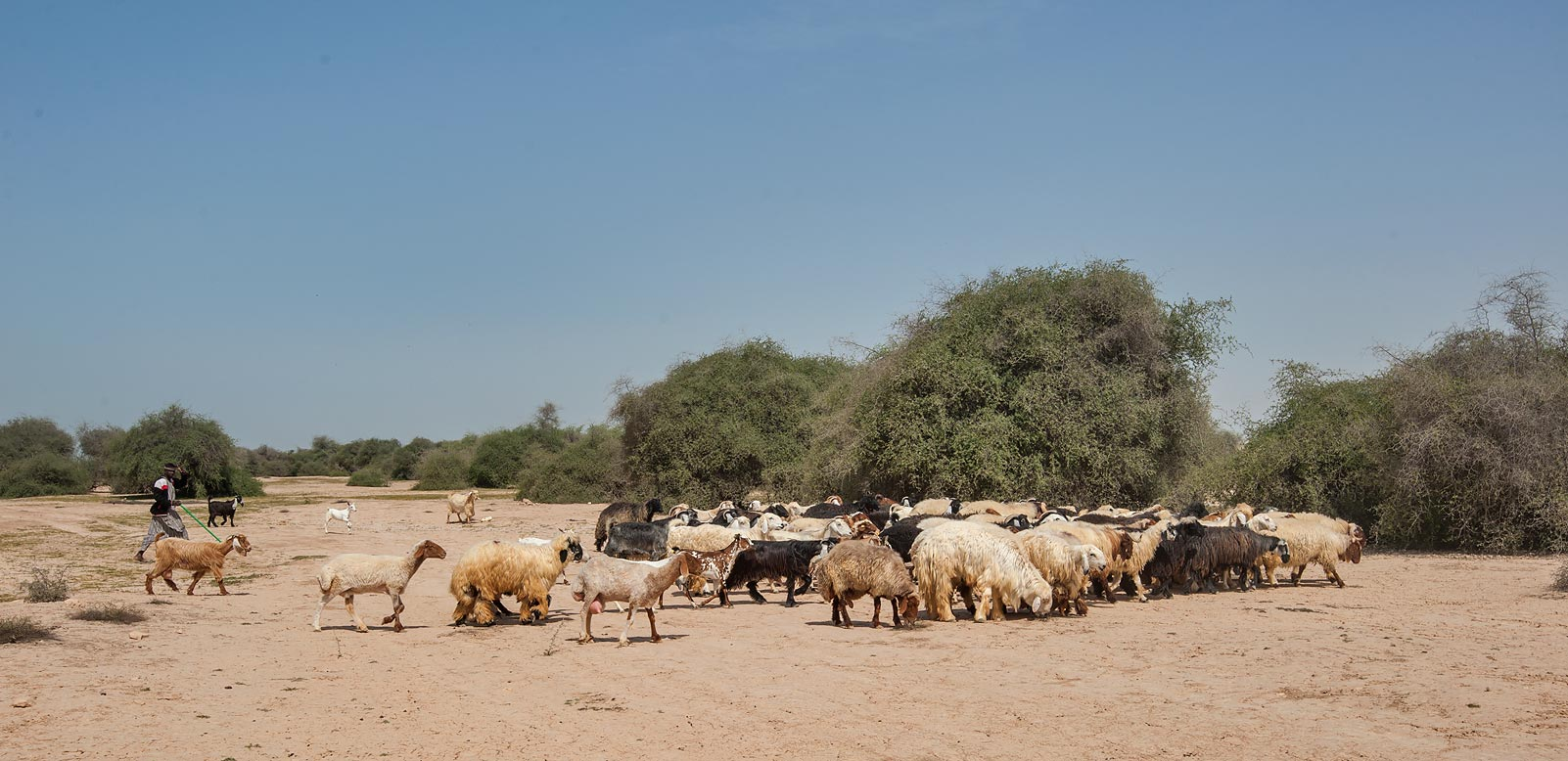
Herd of sheep grazing in Ain Al Nuaman
