= Al Nuaimi =

Ruling royal family of Ajman, UAE

Al Nuaimi آل النعيمي
- Royal house
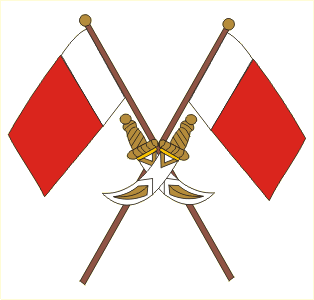
- Parent house: Bedouin tribe; Ghafiri tribe; Na'im; Al Bu Kharaiban; Al Nuaimi
- Country: United Arab Emirates
- Founded: 1816; 210 years ago
- Founder: Rashid bin Humaid Al Nuaimi
- Current head: Humaid bin Rashid Al Nuaimi III
- Titles: Emir; Sheikh
- Style: His/Her Highness

The Al Nuaimi (Arabic: آل النعيمي) family is the ruling royal family of Ajman, one of the seven emirates that together comprise the United Arab Emirates (UAE).

The family name is derived from the singular of 'Na'im': the Na'im is a major tribal confederation divided into three sections, the Al Bu Kharaiban, the Khawatir and the Al Bu Shamis (singular Al Shamsi). The Rulers of Ajman are drawn from the Al Bu Kharaiban section.

== Founding Ajman ==
The foundation of Ajman under Al Nuaimi rule took place when Sheikh Rashid bin Humaid Al Nuaimi and fifty of his followers took the coastal settlement of Ajman from members of the Al Bu Shamis tribe in a short conflict. It wasn't until 1816 or 1817, however, that the Ajman fort finally fell to Rashid's followers and his rule was endorsed by the powerful Sheikh of neighbouring Sharjah and Ras Al Khaimah, Sheikh Sultan bin Saqr Al Qasimi.

== List of Al Nuaimi Rulers ==
- 1816–1838 Sheikh Rashid bin Humaid Al Nuaimi (d. 1838)
- 1838–1841 Sheikh Humaid bin Rashid Al Nuaimi (1st time) (d. 1864)
- 1841–1848 Sheikh Abdelaziz bin Rashid Al Nuaimi (d. 1848)
- 1848–1864 Sheikh Humaid bin Rashid Al Nuaimi (2nd time)
- 1864 – April 1891 Sheikh Rashid bin Humaid Al Nuaimi II (d. 1891)
- April 1891 – 8 July 1900 Sheikh Humaid bin Rashid Al Nuaimi II (d. 1900)
- 8 July 1900 – February 1910 Sheikh Abdulaziz bin Humaid Al Nuaimi (b. 18.. – d. 1910)
- February 1910 – January 1928 Sheikh Humaid bin Abdulaziz Al Nuaimi
- January 1928 – 6 September 1981 Sheikh Rashid bin Humaid Al Nuaimi III (b. 1904 – d. 1981)
- 6 September 1981–present Sheikh Humaid bin Rashid Al Nuaimi III (b. 1931)

== See also ==
- Na'im, for further information on the tribe and its history
