= Bani Kaab =

Bedouin tribe of Oman and the United Arab Emirates

- Arab tribe
- Ethnicity: Arab
- Location: Oman, United Arab Emirates
- Descended from: Banu Ka'b
- Branches: Drisah, Makatim, Misaid, Miyadilah, Miyalisah, Mizahamiyin, Nawaljiyin, Salalat, Sawalim, Shwaihiyin, Yidwah, Zahairat
- Language: Arabic
- Religion: Islam
- Surnames: Al-Kaabi

The Bani Kaab (Arabic: بني كعب) (singular Al Kaabi Arabic: الكعبي) is an Arab tribe in Oman and the United Arab Emirates, also evident in other Gulf countries.

== Origins ==
The tribe is associated with the area around and to the north of the Omani Wilayat of Mahdah, and to areas of the Emirates to the East of Buraimi, including the Wadi Kadra, Wadi Hatta and Wadi Qor.

Subsections of the Bani Kaab include the Drisah, Makatim, Misaid, Miyadilah, Miyalisah, Mizahamiyin, Nawaljiyin, Salalat, Sawalim, Shwaihiyin, Yidwah and Zahairat. Of these, the Drisah and Shwaihiyin were nomadic while the other sections had settled by the turn of the 20th century, a population of some 7,250 of whom 1,150 were Bedouin.

== History ==
By 1844, the tribe had allied itself (in common with other tribes of the interior of southeastern Arabia) with Sheikh Khalifa bin Shakhbut Al Nayhan of the Bani Yas in a tribal confederation which united to drive Wahhabi forces from Buraimi. Despite their alliance under the Bani Yas, the Bani Kaab were rivals to the Na'im and Bani Qitab, and had pushed sections of the Na'im north as far as the Jiri plain.

In an area and time of shifting alliances, a century later the Bani Kaab were in alliance with the Saudis, the Sheikh of the tribe at the time, Obaid bin Jumah, confirming to the Governor of Saudi Arabia's Eastern Province, "Our territories are yours." Although the Na'im and Bani Kaab were frequently opposed to each other, in the 1940s they came together when the prospect of oil concessions loomed. In this, they were opposed to the oil companies, the imposition of the rule of the Trucial Sheikhs, the Sultan of Muscat and the British alike.

When the Buraimi Dispute unfolded in the 1950s, the Bani Kaab supported the Saudi incursion under Shaikh Rashid bin Hamad of the Al Bu Shamis and were involved in fighting against the British force, the Trucial Oman Levies.

== Notable figures ==
- Noura bint Mohammed Al Kaabi — is an Emirati politician and businesswoman currently serving as Minister of State at the UAE Ministry of Foreign Affairs.
- Amer Al-Kaabi — is a Qatar football goalkeeper who played for Qatar in the 2000 Asian Cup. He also played for Al Ahli and Al Ittihad (later renamed Al Gharrafa).
- Ahmed Al-Kaabi — is an Omani professional footballer who plays as a left-back for Al-Nahda and the Oman national team.
- Saad Sherida al-Kaabi — is the current minister of energy in Qatar, and the president and CEO of Qatar Energy, the state-owned corporation which operates all oil and gas activities in the State of Qatar.
- Mohamed Faraj Al-Kaabi — is a male hammer thrower from Qatar.
- Ali bin Abdullah Al Kaabi — is the former minister of labour and social affairs in the United Arab Emirates.
- Khaled Al-Kaabi — Emirati sport shooter.
