= Al Heera =

- Location within United Arab Emirates
- Coordinates: 25°22′53″N 55°24′11″E
- Country: United Arab Emirates
- Emirate: Sharjah
- Elevation: 0 m (0 ft)

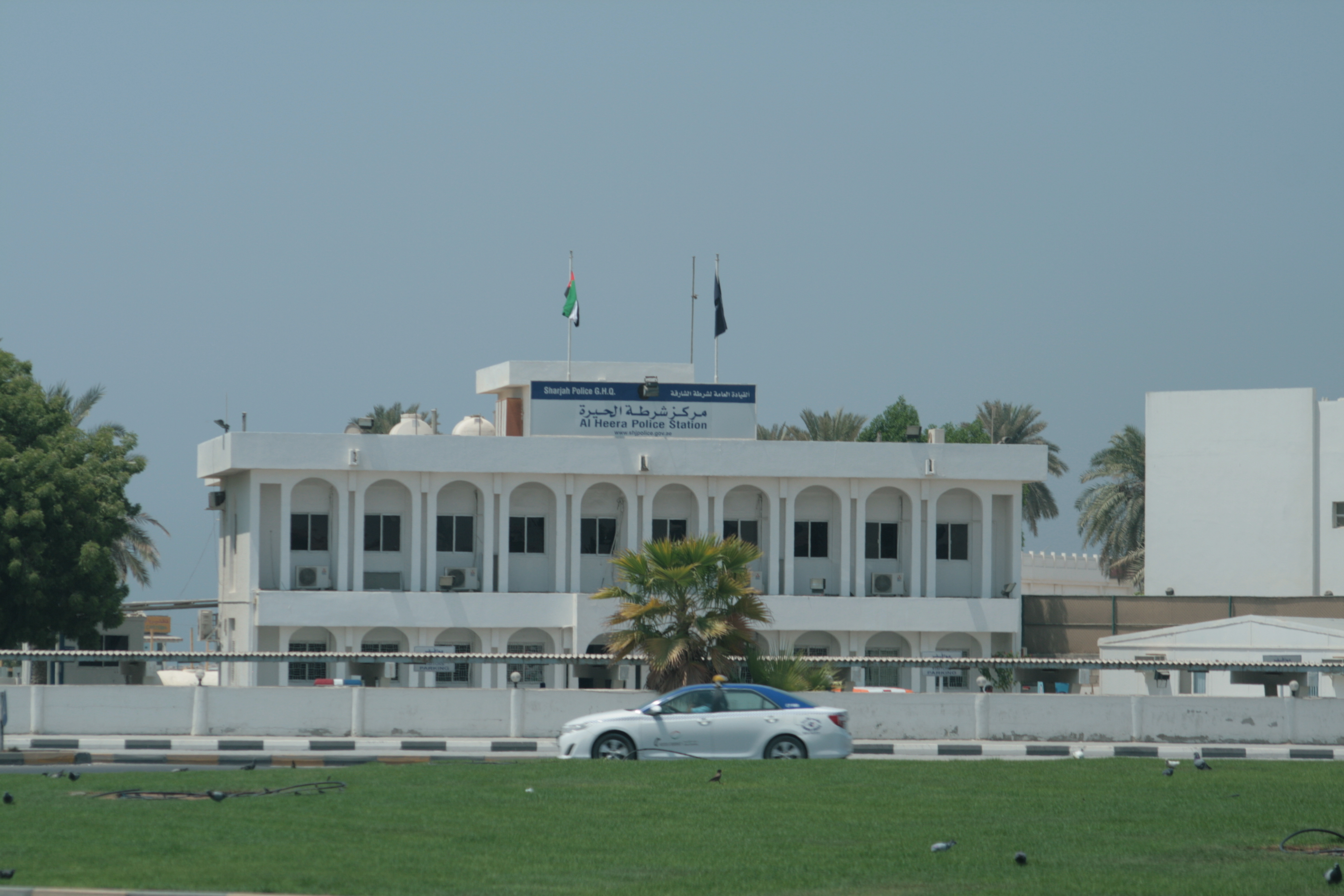
Al Heera Police Station, now home to the Al Heera Literature Society.

Al Heera is a suburb in Northern Sharjah in the United Arab Emirates, traditionally home to the Al Bu Shamis section of the Na'im tribe. At one stage declaring its independence from Sharjah, with its own Sheikh, it formally became part of the Emirate of Sharjah in 1942 on the death of its Ruler, Abdulrahman bin Muhammad Al Shamsi. A coastal settlement with a small harbour formerly used by a number of fishermen and pleasure boat owners, its main distinguishing feature today is its police station, converted in 2019 into the 'Al Heera Literature Society' building.

The original coastal fishing village, built mainly of traditional Emirati adobe and coral houses, sat along the corniche in the area immediately behind the Al Heera Police Station but fell into disuse and was home to taxi drivers and illegal labourers through the 1990s until it was cleared. Little remains today to mark where the original settlement existed, although a 'heritage village' has been recently established alongside a beach development project, Al Heera Beach.

== History ==
Although the settlement of Al Fasht (also known as Al Fisht), which forms part of the area now known as Al Heera, was bombarded by the British as part of the Persian Gulf Campaign of 1819, Al Heera is first directly mentioned in British records of 1830: "The people of Heera, a Joasmee dependency, commit a piracy upon a Bundar Abbas boat. Sheikh Sultan bin Suggur of his own accord compels full restitution of the property and punishes the perpetrators."

In 1840, the then-ruler of the town, Sheikh Humeid bin Obeid bin Saeed, invaded the neighbouring emirate of Ajman, and was eventually ousted by a joint force from Sharjah and Dubai, which went on to burn Al Heera in retaliation.

Some 80 years later, the head of the Al Bu Shamis, Sheikh Abdulrahman Al Shamsi, briefly deposed Humaid bin Abdulaziz Al Nuaimi, the ruler of Ajman on 15 June 1920, by taking Ajman Fort. He was convinced to leave the fort after six days by the British Residency Agent in Sharjah.

At the time Al Heera was quite a large coastal pearling village of about 250 houses. Opposed by the Rulers of Ajman and Sharjah, Abdulrahman was promised safe passage by the British Residency Agent as he owed money to a number of British subjects but was prevented from returning to Al Heera by the vengeful Sheikh of Ajman. After spending time in Ru'us Al Jibal (in Oman) and Al Khan (Southern Sharjah), Abdulrahman was allowed to return to Al Heera by the ruler of Sharjah in 1921 in a settlement at least partly enforced by the presence of the British ship HMS Triad under Captain John Pearson.

The son of the former Ruler of Sharjah, Sheikh Sultan bin Saqr Al Qasimi, was a minor when his uncle, Sheikh Khalid bin Ahmad Al Qasimi, took power in 1914. Sultan subsequently, on reaching his majority, petitioned Ahmad for the restitution of property and money that Khalid had seized on assuming power, but in vain. Embittered, Sultan left Sharjah in 1921 and settled in Dubai. In 1923, he married the daughter of Abdulrahman bin Muhammad Al Shamsi of Al Heera.

Khaled bin Ahmad took this as a challenge and once again moved against Al Heera, but Abdulrahman appealed to the British Residency Agent who negotiated a peace and put two of his own men to guard the fort at Al Heera. Khalid then appointed a Wali over Al Heera who Abdulrahman then arrested. Khalid then moved once again against Al Heera, which Abdulrahman now prepared to defend against a combined force from Sharjah and Ajman. Another British intervention followed and Abdulrahman went to Dubai to join his son-in-law.

By now, the people of Sharjah had had enough and called on Sultan to rule them. On 1 November 1924, Sultan bin Saqr, backed by a force raised by Abdulrahman, was welcomed into Sharjah and deposed Khalid in a brief, 11-day conflict. Abdulrahman's son-in-law was now Ruler of Sharjah and would come to depend on him almost completely.

Abdulrahman was suspected of an attempt on the life of the British Residency Agent in October 1925, causing a major clash between the British government and the Rulers of the Trucial States, specifically Ras Al Khaimah, whose ruler refused to give Abdulrahman up to the British in 1926, but eventually complied. Abdulrahman was sent onto Bombay and then to a four-year exile in Yemen, although he returned after three years with Sultan guaranteeing his good behaviour to the British.

Al Heera was caught up in an outbreak of smallpox that took place throughout the Trucial Coast in 1936, with British reports of infections and deaths consistently enumerating these in Dubai, Sharjah, Ajman, Ras Al Khaimah, Umm Al Quwain and Al Heera – a recognition of the status of the township at that time among the settlements of the coast.

Abdulrahman ruled Al Heera until his death on 10 August 1942, when the township reverted to rule by Sharjah.

== Trucial Oman Scouts ==
Al Heera was the site of the Mirgab Military Base, the core base of operations for the Trucial Oman Scouts, the paramilitary force established by the British government to ensure internal security and stability in the Trucial States. Consisting of a Medical Centre, Mechanical Transport Squadron, Signals Squadron and Quartermaster, the base was serviced by a dhobi and coffee shop owned and operated by an Emarati, Esa bin Mousa Al Amri, as well as a camp shop owned by a Mr Lalchand and managed by a Sikh gentleman by the name of Hari Singh Bhatia.

The base is used today by the Sharjah Police Special Tasks Section.

== Poetry ==
Al Heera was something of a centre for the development of the UAE's strong tradition of Nabati poetry. Among the first Classical Arabic UAE poets to gain importance in this part of the world during the twentieth century were Mubarak Al Oqaili (1880–1954), Salem bin Ali Al Owais (1887–1959) and Ahmed bin Sulayem (1905–1976). Al Owais was born in Al Heera. Three other prominent Nabati poets in the UAE were Khalfan Musabah (1923–1946), Sheikh Saqr Al Qasimi (1925–1993), a former ruler of Sharjah, and Sultan bin Ali Al Owais (1925–2000). The three poets, known as the Heera Group, grew up in Al Heera and were close friends.
