= Fatima bint Rashid Al Nuaimi =

- Sheikha of Fujairah; Sheikha of Ajman
- Born: Ajman, UAE
- Died: 14 December 2014; Fujairah, UAE
- Issue: Hamad bin Mohammed Al Sharqi
Names
- Sheikha Fatima bint Rashid Al Nuaimi
- House: House of Al Nuaim
- Father: Rashid bin Humaid Al Nuaimi III

Sheikha Fatima bint Rashid Al Nuaimi (died 14 December 2014) was an Emirati Ajman royal and a member of the Al Nuaimi and Al Sharqi families. She was the mother of the present Ruler of Fujairah, Hamad bin Mohammed Al Sharqi, who has held that position since 1974. Fatima bint Rashid Al Nuaimi was also the sister of the Ruler of Ajman, Humaid bin Rashid Al Nuaimi.

Sheikha Fatima bint Rashid Al Nuaimi died on 14 December 2014. All flags in Ajman were lowered to half staff to mark a three-day period of mourning following her death.
