= Al Shamsi Holdings =

Emirati company

- Company type: Private
- Industry: Retail
- Founded: 2000
- Headquarters: Dubai, United Arab Emirates
- Area served: Middle East/GCC
- Products: Apparel, Footwear, Accessories, Home accessories
- Number of employees: 520
- Website: http://alshamsiholdings.com/index.php?

Al Shamsi Holdings is a retail organization focusing on fashion in the Gulf Cooperation Council. The company was founded in 2000. It represents international brands Desigual, Vincci, Parfois, Okaidi and Tati. It is one of the leading retail companies in the GCC, employing over 500 multicultural staff, running over 75 stores.

== History ==
Over the past 15 years, they have opened 76 stores across the UAE, Kuwait, Oman, Bahrain and Qatar, with brands from 5 different countries. The first brand to partner with Al Shamsi Holdings was the popular French children’s clothing brand Okaidi.
