= Al Heera Beach Sharjah =

White sand beach in Sharjah

Al Heera Beach Sharjah Sharjah Beach
- Beach
- Al Heera beach pavilion view

- Location within United Arab Emirates Location within Persian Gulf
- Coordinates: 25.3927°N 55.4192°E
- Location: Al Heerah Suburb - Sharjah

Dimensions
  - Length: 1.24 miles (2.00 km)
- Access: Sharjah Al Jubail Bus station - 2.1 m, Khalid port Terminal - 1.1 km Sharjah International Airport - 16 km

Al Heera Beach

Al Heera Beach or Al Hirah Beach also known as Sharjah Beach, is a white sand beach that is located of Sharjah, United Arab Emirates, on the coast of the Persian Gulf. It stretches along the coast south of the city's historic place of Al Heerah - Sharjah.

== Infrastructure and activities ==
Heera beach is a major tourist attraction of the Sharjah. It is also the main place for the local people to escape from the summer heat. Three-organically shaped pavilions each featuring eight buildings and pavilions blend harmoniously into the setting comprising a 3.5 km-long beach and promenade. Embedded between cluster 2 and 3 are a marina with clubhouse, several service buildings and a small park. The marina is open to the public. The beach is popular for its restaurants, cafés, playgrounds, ample greenery, jogging- and bike tracks, and the like make it a hangout for people of all ages. Kite flying and beach football are common sports at the beach.

== Events ==
=== Sharjah Beach Festival ===
The Sharjah Beach Festival was held in 2024 from August 15 to September 15. It featured various water sports, such as paddleboarding, beach volleyball & soccer, and obstacle courses. It also offered yoga, aerobics, Zumba sessions, and expert-led fitness workshops.

Other highlights included musical shows, outdoor beach cinema, reading sessions, puppet shows, and various interactive games and workshops tailored to children, teenagers, and adults.

=== New Year's Eve ===
On New Year's Eve, firework shows are held, lasting 10 minutes from midnight.

== See also ==
- Sharjah
- Al Heerah
