= Amna Al Shamsi =

Emirati politician

Her Excellency Amna Al Shamsi
- آمنة بنت عبد الله الضحاك الشامسي

Minister of Climate Change and Environment
- Incumbent
- Assumed office 6 January 2024
- Preceded by: Mariam Al Mheiri

Personal details
- Born: Amna bint Abdullah Al Dahak Al Shamsi
- Education: Khalifa University

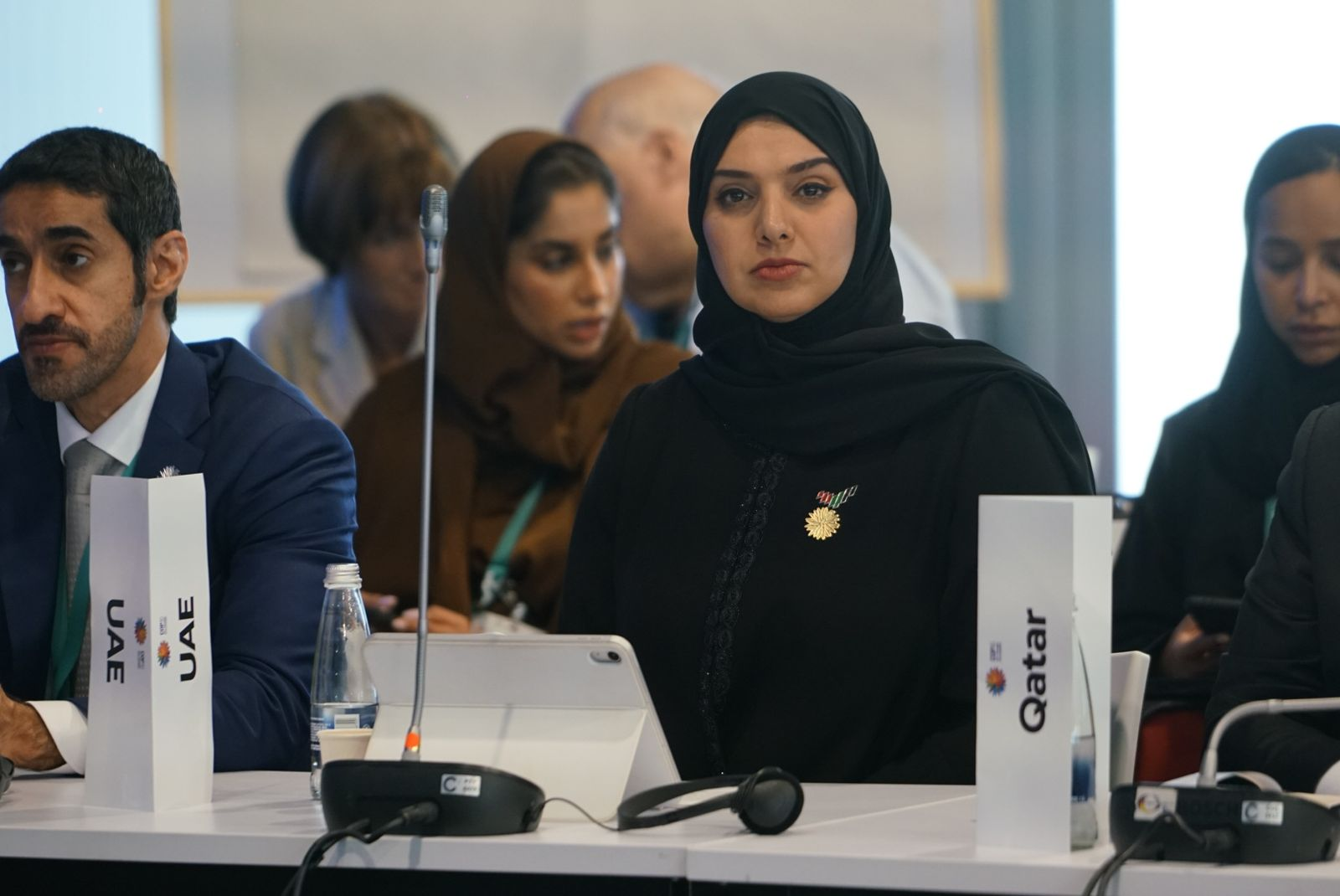
H.E. Dr. Amna Al Dahak, Minister of Climate Change and Environment of the UAE

Amna bint Abdullah Al Dahak Al Shamsi (Arabic: آمنة بنت عبد الله الضحاك الشامسي) is an Emirati politician serving as the Minister of Climate Change and Environment since 6 January 2024. She previously served as the spokesperson for the UAE Government during the COVID-19 pandemic, and chaired the organizing committee for the International Junior Science Olympiad 2021 and the International Biology Olympiad 2023.

== Education ==
She holds a PhD in Computer Engineering from Khalifa University, and both bachelor's and master's degrees in Computer Science from the University of Sharjah.

== Career ==
She previously held the position of Assistant Undersecretary for the Care and Capacity Building Sector at the Ministry of Education since July 2016, and served as Director of the Innovation and Entrepreneurship Department at the Ministry of Education. She has been a member of several committees, including the Digital Transformation Committee, the National Family Prevention Committee, and the Gulf Gifted Council. She chairs several national committees, including the Child Protection Council in the Educational Environment, the National Committee for Green Education, and the National Committee for Creative Arts in Education.
