= Mohammed Ahmad S Al-Shamsi =

Inventor, professor and former delegate

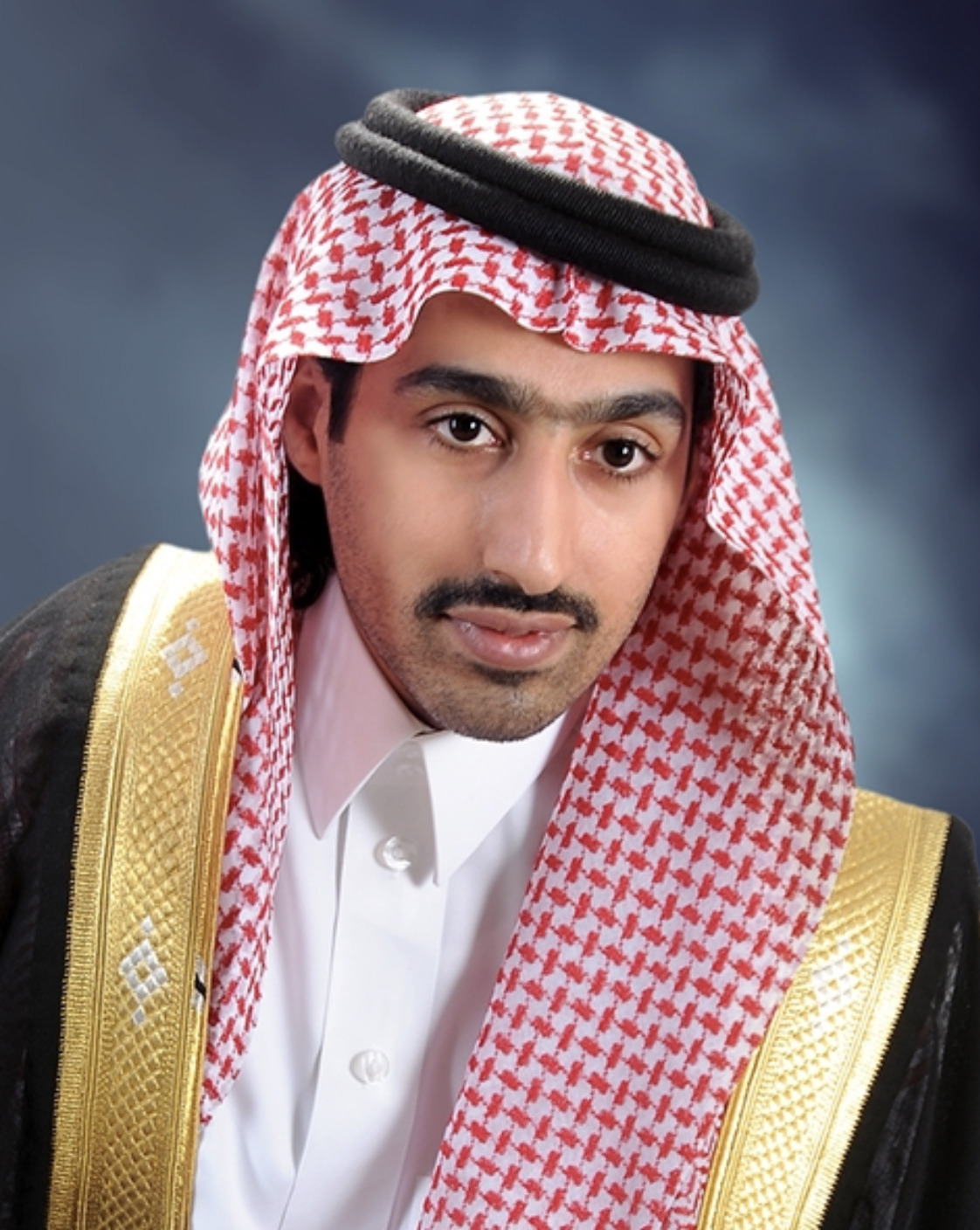
- Born: Dammam, Saudi Arabia
- Education: King Saud University (MSc), University of Waterloo (PhD), Stanford University, Harvard University, University of Cambridge, University of Oxford.
- Occupations: Professor in King Abdulaziz City for Science & Technology and Deputy Director-General for The General Directory of Research Grants.

Mohammed Ahmad S Al-Shamsi (Arabic: محمد أحمد الشامسي) is known for his work as an inventor, professor, and a formal delegate in Saudi Missions in selected United Nations meetings and agreements since 2013 such as Climate Summit, United Nations Framework Convention on Climate Change (UNFCCC), Paris Agreement of 2015, and Intergovernmental Panel on Climate Change (IPCC). He has worked to protect the Saudi interests in the international negotiations. He also was a formal representative of King Abdulaziz City for Science & Technology (KACST) in several international forums such as East Africa Environmental Risk & Opportunities Summit (The Republic of Djibouti) and The meeting of The Global Leaders of Innovation Funders (Manchester, UK).

== Education ==
Mohammed received his B.Sc. in 2005, and M.Sc. in 2007 from King Saud University (KSU), Riyadh, and received his Ph.D., (Civil Engineering) in 2013 from University of Waterloo (UW), Canada. He received a multiple management credentials and executive educations from top ranking schools and accredited associations around the world including Stanford University, Harvard University, University of Oxford, University of Cambridge, Project management Institute (PMI), and American Academy of Project Management (AAPM).

== Career ==
He started his career as academic researcher in 2006 in the laboratories of King Abdulaziz City for Science and Technology (KACST) since he got his bachelor's degree. He then held a faculty position of assistant professor (civil and environmental engineering) in 2013, and associate professor in 2019. Al-Shamsi was temporary worked in 2015 as adjunct professor in Civil Engineering Department, Imam Muhammad ibn Saud Islamic University, Riyadh.

Since 2013, he held several management roles starting from a supervisor of laboratories in the national center of environmental technologies, acting manager of several research national centers. Then, he was appointed a deputy director for scientific affairs in the Life Science and Environmental Research Institute (LSERI) in 2015 until 2018. In 2019, he was appointed deputy director-general for the General Directory of Research Grants in KACST.

In his management role, he structured and restructured several departments and units and set financial & non-financial incentive-based-performance programs, human resources development plans, auditing and risk management plans and project management restructuring plan. He was leading the hiring team in the appointments for over 300 candidates. He had designed and developed the training pathways for over 100 employees.

One of his publication, where he was the first author, was cited over 100 times in many prestigious journals, where he and his co-workers proposed a new chemical equation to illustrate the behavior of quick passivation of nano iron particles in contact with the persulfate chemical oxidant.

Al-Shamsi published many scientific articles in high impact peer-reviewed journals. One of his publication, where he was the first author, was cited over 100 times in many prestigious journals. He was a co-author for the 3rd National Communication that was submitted by the government of Saudi Arabia to United Nation body (UNFCCC). His name was indicated in the section of Appendix X2: Contributors & Reviewers for "A Guide to the Project Management Body of Knowledge (PMBOK 6th edition)" and "The Standard for Portfolio Management, 5th edition".

Alshamsi was an official examiner for several scientific prizes including the outstanding awards for the King Abullah Prize for Inventors & Gifted (2013 round), and Almarai Prize for Scientific Innovation (Research Unit Prize in the field of Environment-2013). He also serve as a reviewer for several scientific journals and organizations including Royal Society of Chemistry (RSC) Advances, Journal of Hazardous Materials, Chemosphere, Nanoscale (RSC), and Environmental Research.

Al-Shamsi co-invented several technologies and software in the field of carbon capture and storage, climate change, desertification, groundwater remediation, and nano synthesizing machines and techniques. Over 17 patents were filled with his name as a first inventor with other co-inventors in several patent offices including the United States Patent & Trademark Office (USPTO), Saudi Patent Office, and World Intellectual Property Organization (WIPO).

== Publications ==
=== Peer reviewed research ===
- Alharbi, Badr H.; Pasha, Mohammad J.; Al-Shamsi, Mohammed Ahmad S. (20 March 2019). "Influence of Different Urban Structures on Metal Contamination in Two Metropolitan Cities". Scientific Reports. 9 (1): 4920. Bibcode:2019NatSR...9.4920A. doi:10.1038/s41598-019-40180-x. PMC 6426876. PMID 30894573.
- Alharbi, Badr H.; Pasha, Mohammad J.; Al-Shamsi, Mohammed Ahmad S. (April 2019). "Metal contamination decrease with new legislation: A decade of metal risk assessment in urban dust". Journal of Environmental Management. 236: 214–223. Bibcode:2019JEnvM.236..214A. doi:10.1016/j.jenvman.2019.01.062. PMID 30735940. S2CID 73452240.
- Al-Shamsi, Mohammed Ahmad; Thomson, Neil R. (2013). "Competition by aquifer materials in a bimetallic nanoparticle/persulfate system for the treatment of trichloroethylene". Environmental Science: Processes & Impacts. 15 (10): 1964–8. doi:10.1039/C3EM00285C. PMID 23949733.
- Al-Shamsi, Mohammed A.; Thomson, Neil R.; Forsey, Steven P. (1 October 2013). "Iron based bimetallic nanoparticles to activate peroxygens". Chemical Engineering Journal. 232: 555–563. Bibcode:2013ChEnJ.232..555A. doi:10.1016/j.cej.2013.07.109.
- Al-Shamsi, Mohammed A.; Thomson, Neil R. (11 September 2013). "Treatment of Organic Compounds by Activated Persulfate Using Nanoscale Zerovalent Iron". Industrial & Engineering Chemistry Research. 52 (38): 13564–13571. doi:10.1021/ie400387p.
- Al-Shamsi, Mohammed A.; Thomson, Neil R. (30 October 2013). "Treatment of a Trichloroethylene Source Zone using Persulfate Activated by an Emplaced Nano-Pd–Fe0 Zone". Water, Air, & Soil Pollution. 224 (11): 1780. Bibcode:2013WASP..224.1780A. doi:10.1007/s11270-013-1780-1. S2CID 98230651.

=== Books ===
- Co-authored the Third National Communication of the Kingdom of Saudi Arabia submitted to the United Nation Framework Convention on Climate Change (UNFCCC) on 22 December 2016 by Saudi Designated National Authority (DNA).
- Al-Shamsi, Mohammed (2013). Iron Nanoparticles for In Situ Chemical Oxidation (Thesis). hdl:10012/7694.
- Al-Shamsi, M. A., Traffic Density on Urban Highway of Riyadh City as a Source of Soil Pollution by Heavy Metals. M.Sc. Thesis. King Saud University, Riyadh, Kingdom of Saudi Arabia. (2007).
- Strategic Priorities for Environmental Technology Program. (2008), King Abdulaziz City for Science & Technology (KACST) and Ministry of Economy and Planning. Riyadh City, Kingdom of Saudi Arabia.
- Pasha, M., Al-Shamsi, M., et al. ″Urban Particulate Air Pollution- An Effort to Determine Inhalable Particulate Load, size Distribution and Chemical Characterization in Ambient Air in Riyadh″, Internal research report, Natural Resources and Environmental Research Institute, KACST, Riyadh city, Kingdom of Saudi Arabia (2007-2008).
- Mohammed Ahmad S Al-Shamsi. "Research Sub-Contractor: Models for the Decline of the National Research and Innovation System." Release Date: Feb. 2, 2020. ISBN 978-1-71447-820-0.

==== Research Sub-Contractor ====
The book "Research Sub-Contractor: Models for The Decline of The National Research and Innovation System" criticizes the misconduct of research and research funding in Saudi Arabia and the like countries.

One of the biggest obstacles the author notes is the country's current system of funding subcontractors to conduct research. Far too often, subcontractors divert their funding to foreign researchers and academic institutions for self-promotion and publication in prestigious international scientific journals. This undermines the Saudi research and development system by using limited government money to support foreign institutions.

For Al-Shamsi, economic independence and homeland security will only be guaranteed by local and homegrown innovation.

The author proposes various ideas on how the Saudi government could foster homegrown innovation. These include the creation of new government councils that report directly to the prime minister, new patent laws and greater protections on intellectual property, and the funding of Saudi industrial expositions and scientific journals.

The book is a step by step playbook for maximizing research and innovation, for countries, but the same ideas could also be applied to improve businesses.

== Patents ==
- Al-Shamsi, M. A., & Thomson, N. R., System and method for chemical oxidation of organic compounds using nano-metal catalysts to activate peroxygens. WIPO (PCT). WO2013142995A1. Published 2013.
- Al-Shamsi, M. A., Al-Fadul, S. M., and Al-Shamari, A., Device For Automated Synthesis of Metal Nanoparticles. United States Patent Office (US2019/0291071 A1). Published 2019.
- Al-Shamsi, M. A., & Al-Fadul, S. M., Laboratory Equipment and Method of Using The Same for Drying a Starting Material to Produce Nano Material. United States Patent Office (US2019/0226762 A1). Published 2019.
- Al-Shamsi, M. A., & Thomson, N. R., Method for Treatment of Hazardous Organic Compounds Using Nano-metal Particles Catalyzed Peroxygens. Saudi Patent No. 3518. Issued on 04/08/2014.
- Al-Shamsi, M. A., & Al-Fadul, S. M., Reduction Drying Laboratory Apparatus for Nano Particles. Saudi Patent No. 5312. Issued on 12/04/2017.
- Al-Shamsi, M. A., Al-Fadul, S. M., and Al-Shamari, A., Nano Manufacturing Machine in Redox Controlled Conditions. Saudi Patent No. 5666. Issued on 21/12/2017.
- Al-Shamsi, M. A., Al-Fadul, S. M., Pasha, M. J., High Sensitive Nanomaterial Preparation Device for Imaging and Characterization Instruments. Saudi Patent Application No. 117390009. Filled in 28/09/2017.
- Al-Shamsi, M. A., Azizov A.A., Al-Fadul, S. M., Alosmanov R.M., Aliyeva S.B., Bunyad-zadeh I.A., Eyvazova G.M., Aliyev E.M., A Method of Manufacturing a Hybrid Composite of Natural Bentonite Clay and Synthetic Rubber. Saudi Patent Application No. 117390187. Filled in 19/12/2017.
- Al-Shamsi, M. A., Alharbi B. H., An Automatic System to Combat Desertification to Stop Sand Movement Through Controlling Groundwater Pumping Based on Wind Speed. Saudi Patent Application No. 118390798. Filled in 26/08/2018.
- Al-Shamsi, M. A., Alharbi B. H., Al-Fadul, S. M., Synthesizing Method of Zero Valent Metal Nano Materials In The Outer Space. Saudi Patent Application No. 118400058. Filled in 27/09/2018.
- Al-Shamsi, M. A., Alharbi B. H., A Giant Machine to Capture and Dispose Green House Gases by Pumping Them Into Stratosphere. Saudi Patent Application No. 118400132. Filled in 23/10/2018.
- Al-Shamsi, M. A., Alharbi B. H., Quick Method to Transport Green House Gases (GHGs) Using Stratospheric Balloon. Saudi Patent Application No. 118400162. Filled in 04/11/2018.
- Al-Shamsi, M. A., Alharbi B. H., Hot Carbon dioxide Balloon. Saudi Patent Application No. 118400195. Filled in 14/11/2018.
- Al-Shamsi, M. A., Alharbi B. H., Destructive Device for Sand Dunes. Saudi Patent Application No. 118400196. Filled in 14/11/2018.
- Al-Shamsi, M. A., Alharbi B. H., Al-Fadul, S. M., Method and Apparatus for Carbon and Utilization Using Nano Slurry Medium. Saudi Patent Application No. 118400235. Filled in 27/11/2018.
- Al-Shamsi, M. A., Alharbi B. H., Open-Circuit Device to Capture CO2 from Human Respiratory. Saudi Patent Application No. 119400381. Filled in 21/01/2019.
