= Parfois =

Portuguese women's accessories brand

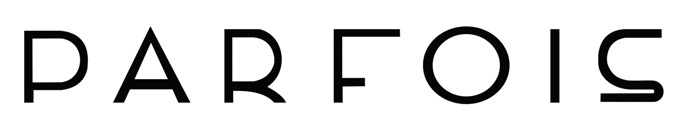

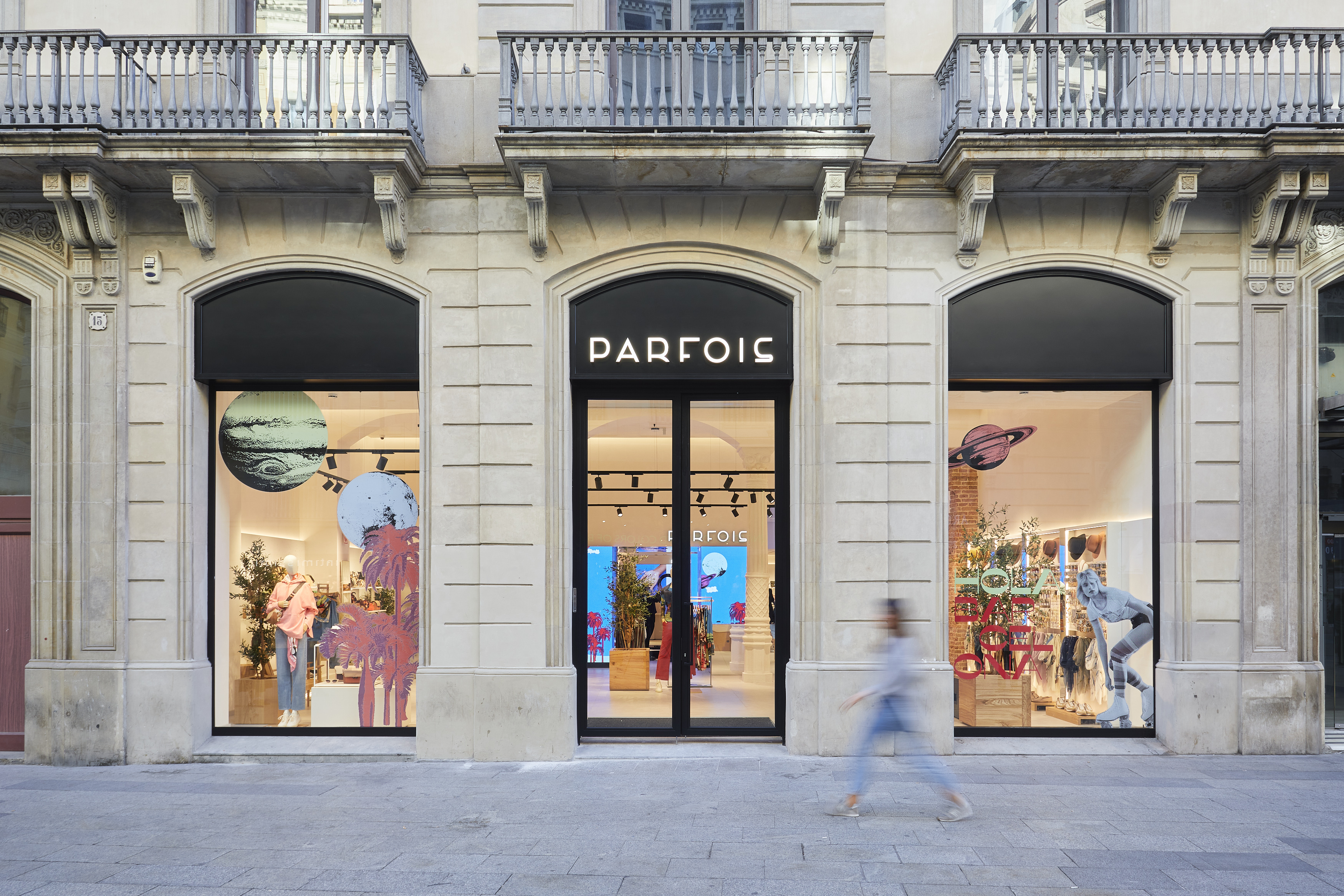
- Shop in the Portal de l'Àngel in Barcelona
- Company type: Private
- Industry: Fashion Retail
- Founded: 1994
- Founder: Manuela Medeiros
- Headquarters: Porto, Portugal
- Number of locations: 1,000+ (2025)
- Area served: Worldwide
- Key people: Luis Maseres (CEO)
- Products: Bags, Clothing, Jewellery, Shoes, Accessories
- Website: https://www.parfois.com/

Parfois is a Portuguese women's accessories brand with fashion accessories such as handbags, jewelry, wallets, sunglasses, belts, scarves, watches, hair accessories, etc.

== History ==
Parfois started as a fashion accessory brand in 1994, opening its first store in Porto, Portugal.

In September 2019, Parfois inaugurated the opening of its 1,000th store, in Paris.

== Description ==
Parfois is specialized in the creation and distribution of bags (handbags, wallets, travel bags), accessories (jewelry, sunglasses, scarves, belt, hats, gloves), shoes (heels, platform heels, wedges, flats, boots) and clothes (capes, short woven coats, tops, leggings, bottoms).

In 2019, Parfois reached the 1,000 stores milestone. In 2023, the company managed stores in Albania, Poland, Switzerland, Malta, Cyprus, Dominican Republic, Spain (365 Spanish stores), Turkey, Trinidad and Tobago, Israel, France and Ireland.

== Gallery ==
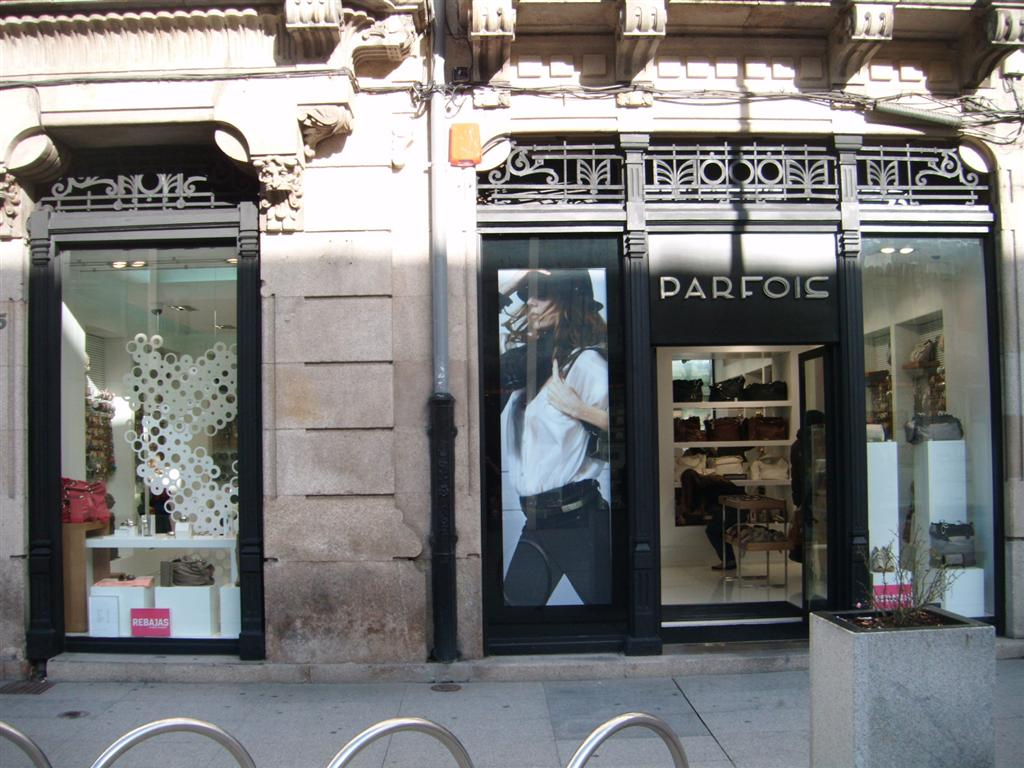
Store in Plaza Lugo, Coruña, Spain.

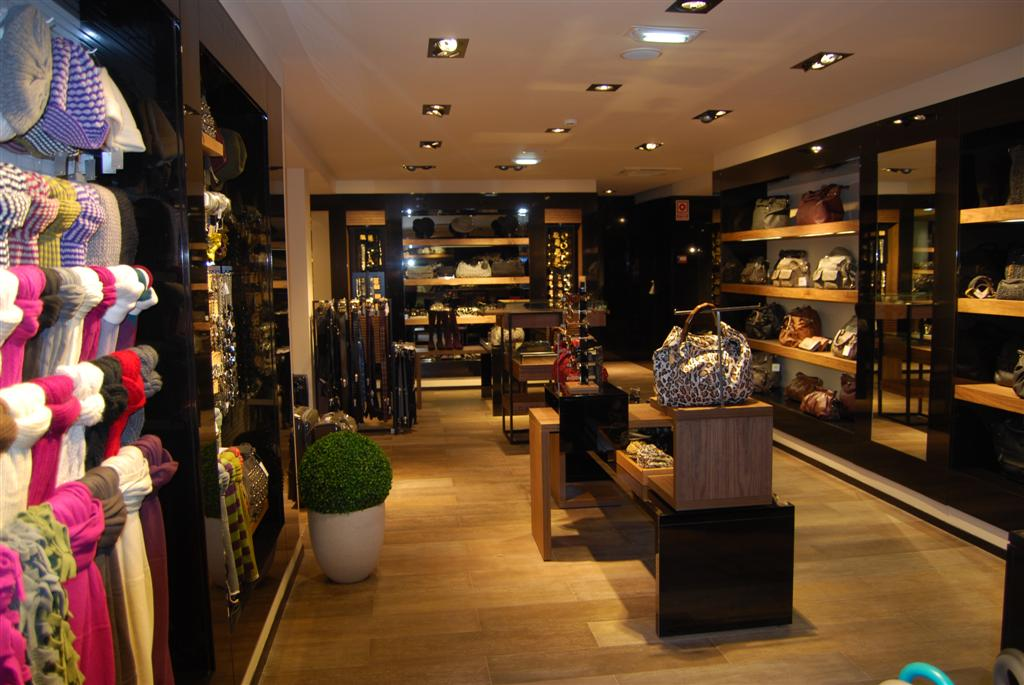
Store interior in Preciados, Madrid, Spain.

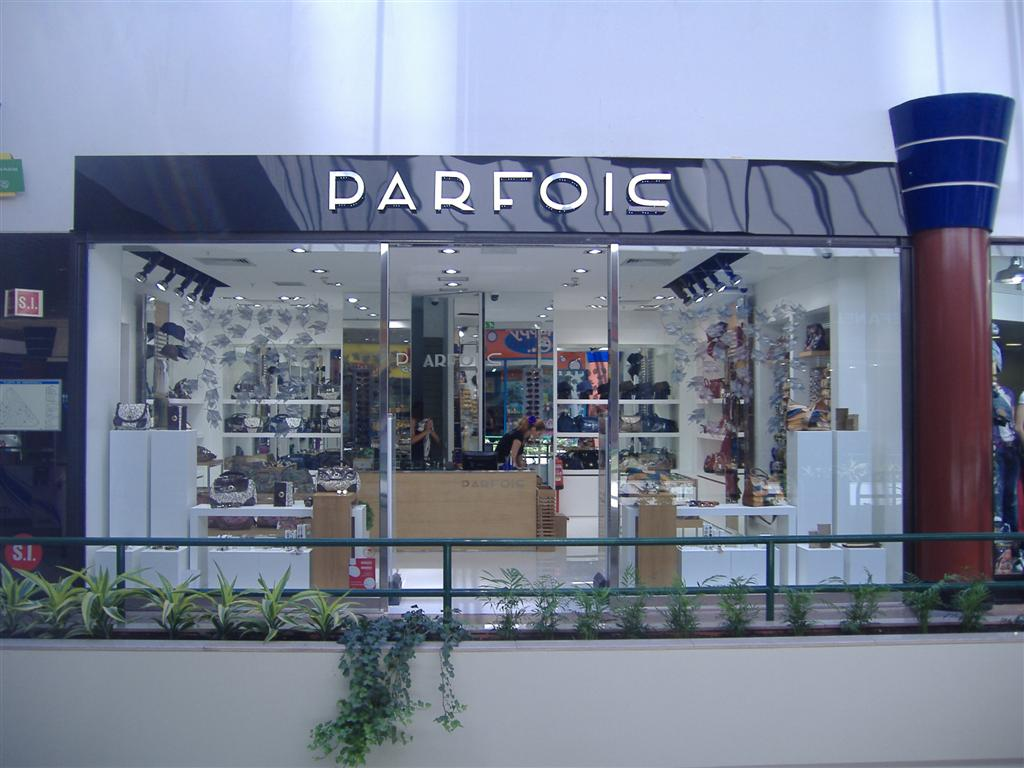
Store in Amoreiras Shopping Center, Lisbon, Portugal.
