= HMS Triad (N88) =

Ship of the Royal Navy

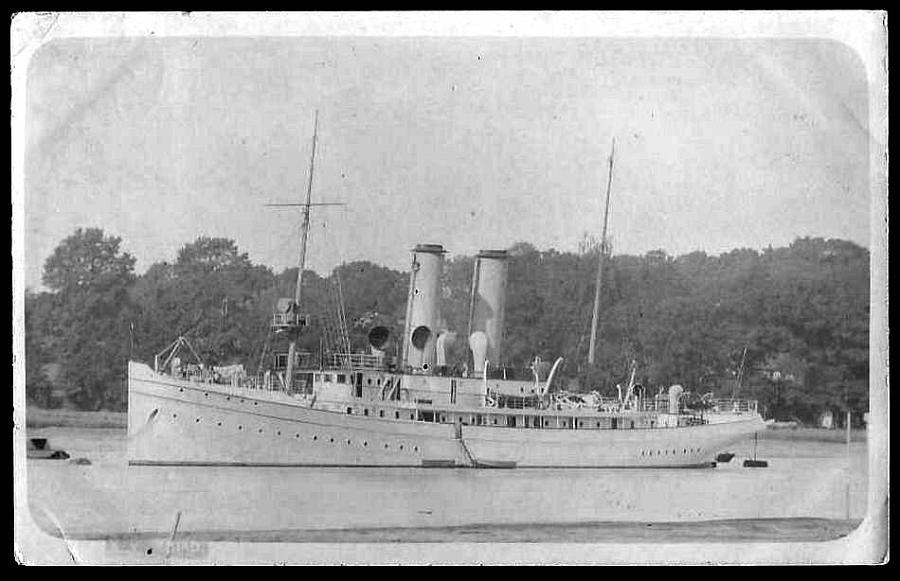
- HMS Triad shortly after entering naval service

History

United Kingdom
- Name: HMS Triad
- Builder: Caledon Shipbuilding and Engineering Co.
- Launched: 9 November 1908
- In service: August 1914
- Out of service: May 1933
- Identification: Pennant number N88
- Fate: Sold out of the navy

General characteristics
- Class & type: Hired yacht
- Tonnage: 1,212 GRT; 440 NRT
- Length: 250 ft (76 m)
- Beam: 35 ft 6 in (10.82 m)
- Propulsion: Two shafts; Twin triple expansion engines 409 hp (0.305 MW) each
- Armament: 2 × 12-pounder naval guns

HMS Triad was a private yacht that was hired into the service of the Royal Navy during World War I, and later became the headquarters ship of the British navy in the Persian Gulf.

== Private yacht ==
Triad R.Y.S. was built by Caledon Shipbuilding and Engineering Co. in Dundee for G.A. Shenley Esq. from Warsash, Southampton and designed to be reminiscent of Edwardian ocean greyhounds. She was launched on 9 November 1908 and completed in June 1909. Shenley only kept her for three years before selling her to Richard Grech, who, in the summer of 1914, was yachting in the Eastern Mediterranean when the First World War was declared. Grech promptly made his way to the nearest friendly port and offered Triad to authorities for use as an auxiliary patrol vessel.

== Service ==
=== World War I ===
Due to her size, 250 feet (76 m) in length, and speed, powered by two custom-built Caledon triple expansion engines, the Admiralty did not hesitate at the offer and armed the now HMS Triad with two 12-pounder guns. She would be used during the Gallipoli offensive during the first landings, transporting Australian forces from British Egypt to the front, as well as medically evacuating the wounded.

The admiral of the Gallipoli naval force, John de Robeck, saw the battleship HMS Triumph sunk by the German submarine U-21, with de Robeck ordering the fleet to disperse, but still needing to be near the front, chose to transfer his headquarters to HMS Triad. de Robeck so liked Triad due to her ability to steam close inshore, out of submarine sight, that he kept her as his flagship after Gallipoli. In this capacity she saw further service in the Aegean Sea before being transferred to the Persian Gulf near the end of the war.

=== Post-war ===
At the end of the war, instead of transferring Triad back to Grech, as had been done to most other hired yachts, the Admiralty decided to retain her, and compensated Grech in 1919. On 8 December 1919, Triad collided with HMS Lucia.

On 1 January 1920, she became a Special Service Vessel and served as the headquarters ship for the Royal Navy in the Persian Gulf, suffering a collision with SS Bankura on 7 October 1920.

Triad became involved in the settlement of a number of disputes in the Trucial States, including the imbroglio following the invasion of Ajman by the sheikh of the neighbouring town of Al Heera, Abdulrahman bin Muhammad Al Shamsi, in December 1920. Triad was ultimately sold out of Royal Navy service at Bombay in May 1933. She was replaced as the Persian Gulf headquarters ship by HMS Shoreham.

== Legacy ==
On 2 November 1995, a model of Triad was sold at auction by Christie's for 20,250 GBP.
