= Alia Al Shamsi =

Emirati author and poet (born 1982)

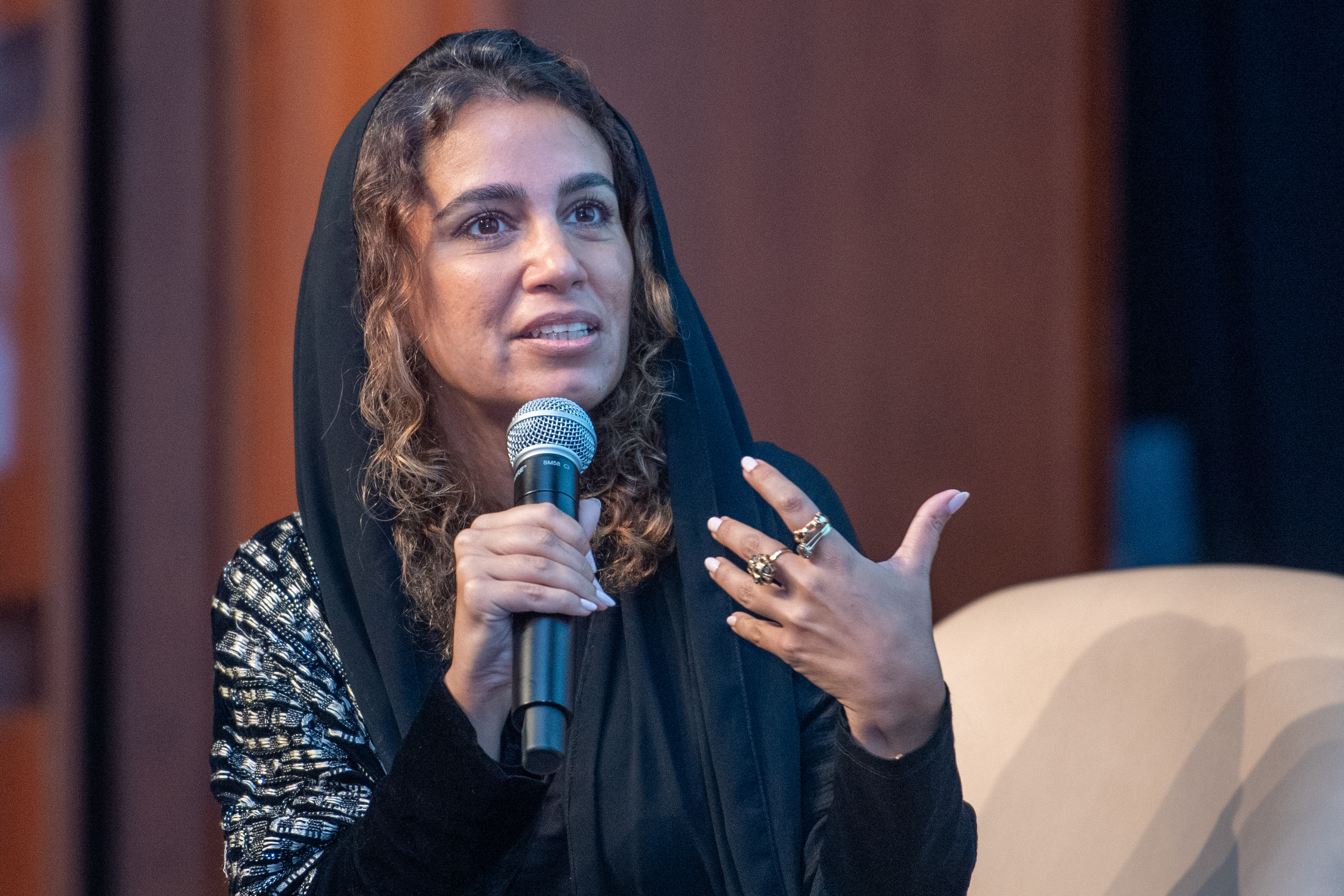
- Born: 1982 (age 43–44); Dubai
- Occupation: Cultural Programming Manager at the Louvre Abu Dhabi
- Writing career
- Genre: for children

Alia Al Shamsi (born 1982) is an Emirati author. She is the Cultural Programming Manager at the Louvre Abu Dhabi.

== Life ==
Al Shamsi is an Emarati Italian. She was born in Dubai in 1982. She gained a degree in photography from Durham University in 2008. Al Shamsi graduated with a photography degree in 2014 from Griffith University in Brisbane, Australia. Four years later she was awarded a master's degree from Durham University.

In 2019, she was the Acting Cultural Programming Manager at the Louvre Abu Dhabi art museum.

In 2021, Harpars Bazaar magazine decided to arrange for six women to be given mentors. Six leading women achievers were chosen and Alia Al Shamsi was one of them. It was said to be an exercise in "women empowerment". She was asked about "women empowerment" and she said that the important idea was empowerment and there was no need to give it a gender. The May 2021 issue of Harper's Bazaar Arabia was devoted to this demonstration. In 2021 she was profiled as a female leaders of note in the MENA region by Entrepreneur magazine.

In 2024 she was still at the Louvre Abu Dhabi as the Cultural Programming Manager.

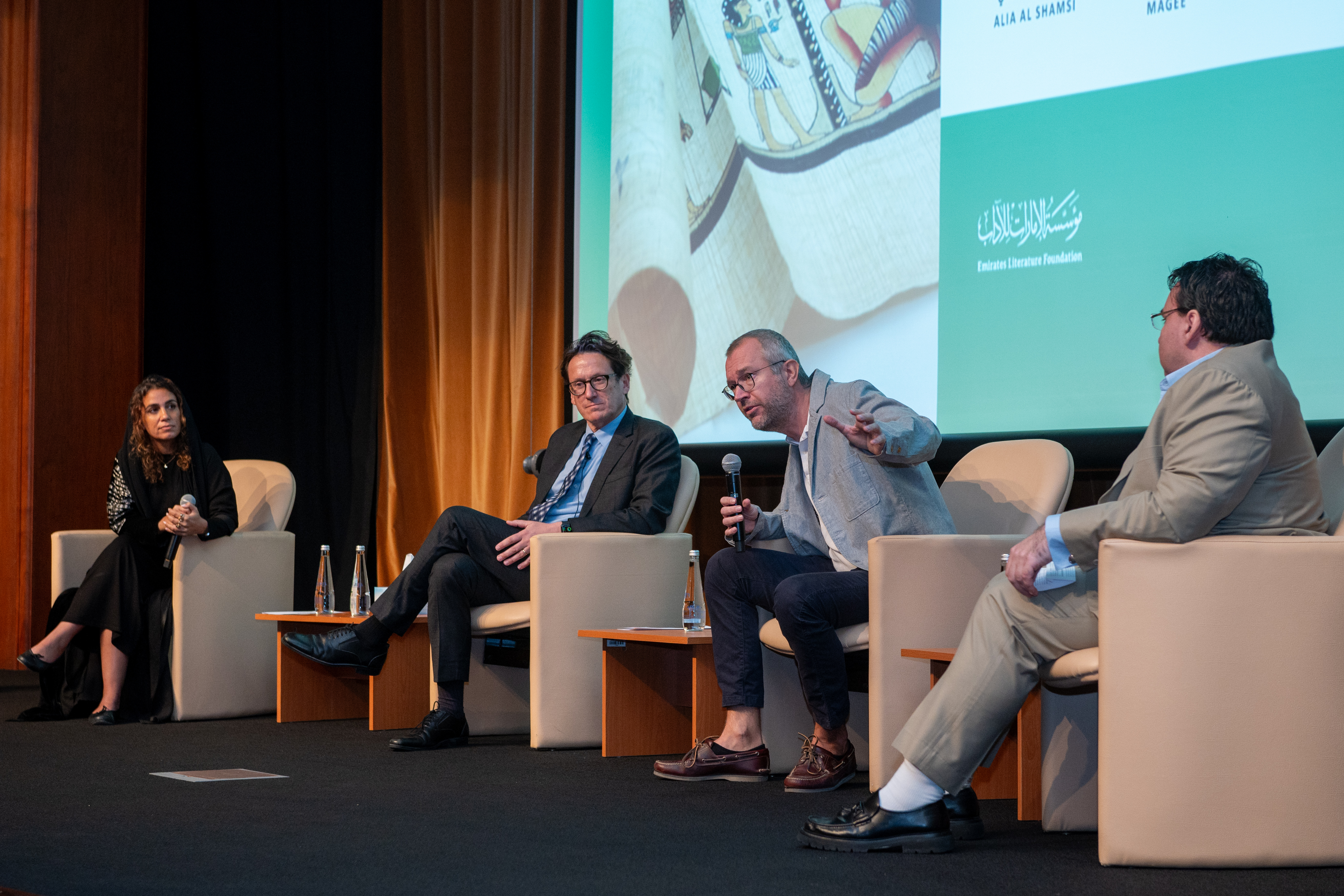
At the UAE's National Library and Archives in 2023

== Works ==
In 2014 her children's book Alayah was published. It was illustrated and it concerned a story about a girl with sand in her hair. The book was included in "Reading in Arabic Challenge" by Dubai Culture. Al Shamsi holds awards including British Council Cultural Leadership International 2010, EDAAD Scholarship 2007, and 2011 Emirates Woman Artist of the Year.
