= Rashid bin Humaid Al Nuaimi III =

- Sheikh
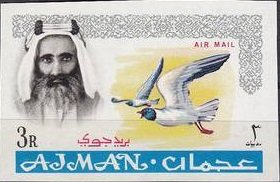
- portrait on a stamp, 1965
- Reign: 1928 – 6 September 1981
- Predecessor: Humaid bin Abdulaziz Al Nuaimi
- Successor: Humaid bin Rashid Al Nuaimi III
- Born: 1902; Ajman, Emirate of Ajman, Trucial States
- Died: 6 September 1981 (aged 78–79); United Arab Emirates
Names
- Rashid bin Ḥumaid Al Nuaimi
- House: Al Nuaimi
- Father: Humaid bin Abdulaziz Al Nuaimi
- Mother: Sheikha bint Saeed bin Majed bin Ali bin Rashid Al Nuaimi
- Religion: Sunni Islam

Sheikh Rashid bin Humaid Al Nuaimi III (Arabic: راشد بن حميد النعيمي), (1902 – 6 September 1981) was an Emirati royal, politician and a co-founder of the United Arab Emirates who served as the 9th ruler of Ajman and ruled the emirate from 1928 until 1981. Throughout his 53 years as ruler, he worked to build Ajman.

He is the father of the current ruler, Sheikh Humaid bin Rashid Al Nuaimi III. The ruling family belongs to the Al Na'im tribe.

== Early life ==
Rashid was born in Ajman in 1902, the son of Sheikh Humaid bin Abdulaziz Al Nuaimi, ruler of Ajman. In childhood he learned the Quran and Islamic studies and horsemanship, and he was trained in administration and government by accompanying his father, whom he served as deputy before succeeding him.

== Reign ==
Rashid took power in Ajman in 1928 as his father's successor and remained ruler until his death in 1981, a reign of about fifty-three years. In 1960 he appointed his son Humaid crown prince.

=== Development of the emirate ===
Sources credit his rule with the creation of a municipality department responsible for roads, markets and building projects, and with founding the Ajman Police in 1967. Education was placed on a formal footing in 1958, with schools opened for boys and girls, and an Islamic scientific institute was founded to teach the basics of sharia. Hospitals offering free treatment were established, and electricity and drinking water reached households in the emirate. His biography on nla.ae describes him as the first ruler in the Emirates to issue passports.

== Role in the formation of the UAE ==
Rashid is listed among the founding fathers of the United Arab Emirates. He took part in the meetings that formed the federation and signed the provisional constitution on 2 December 1971, after which Ajman became part of the UAE and he joined the Federal Supreme Council. His biography also notes his support for cooperation with the Arab League, which the new state joined on 6 December 1971.

== Children ==
- Ali bin Rashid Al Nuaimi (died July 1990)
- Fatima bint Rashid Al Nuaimi (died 14 December 2014)
- Humaid bin Rashid Al Nuaimi III
- Abdulla bin Rashid Al Nuaimi (died 12 January 2013)
- Nasser bin Rashid Al Nuaimi
- Nayla bint Rashid Al Nuaimi
- Shaikha bint Rashid Al Nuaimi
- Saeed bin Rashid Al Nuaimi (died 26 February 2025)
- Abdulaziz bin Rashid Al Nuaimi
- Saqr bin Rashid Al Nuaimi
- Hamdan bin Rashid Al Nuaimi
- Sultan bin Rashid Al Nuaimi
- Mohammed bin Rashid Al Nuaimi
- Sheikha Azza bint Rashid Alnuaimi
- Sheikha Salama bint Rashid Alnuaimi
- Ahmed bin Rashid Al Nuaimi
- Maryam bint Rashid Al Nuaimi

== See also ==
- Royal families of the United Arab Emirates
