= Khawatir =

Bedouin tribe of the United Arab Emirates

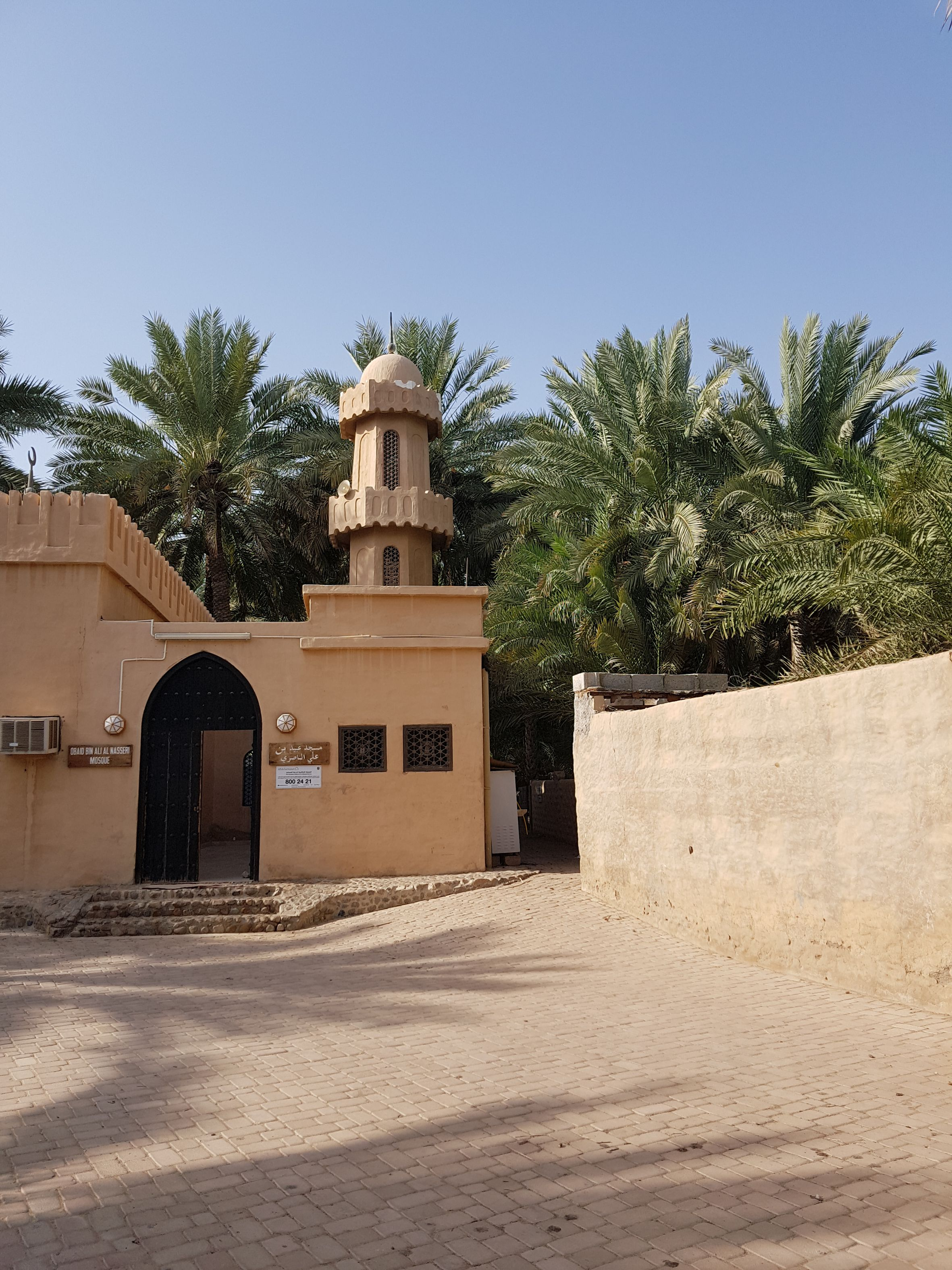
A mosque in the Buraimi Oasis, one of a number of settlements that was home to the Khawatir subsection of the Na'im.

The Khawatir (singular Khateri الخاطري) is an Arab tribe of the United Arab Emirates, a subsection of the Na'im.

== Origins ==
The Khawatir form one of three subsections of the Na'im, the others being the Al Bu Shamis and the Al Bu Kharaiban. It is from the latter that the current Rulers of the Emirate of Ajman are drawn.

A Bedouin tribe, whose dar stretched from Buraimi north to the Jiri Plain, the Khawatir mostly settled in the area around the Buraimi oasis and, resentful of the encroachment of the Al Bu Falah and their allies the Manasir in the C19th, adopted Wahhabism as a doctrine. Following the Saudi withdrawal in 1871, they submitted to Muscat but then became dependent on Zayed bin Khalifa Al Nahyan having been, like the Dawahir, hard pressed by his expansion in the Buraimi/Al Ain Oasis. The Khawatir frequently came into conflict with the Sharqiyin of Fujairah, but would generally ally with the Sharqiyin against the powerful Qawasim of Sharjah and Ras Al Khaimah. This occasional antipathy between the Khawatir (and their allies the Ghafalah) and Qawasim would result in problems for the British oil companies attempting to negotiate concessions and access to the interior.

As with the other Na'im of Buraimi, the Khawatir recognised the influence of the head of the Al Bu Kharaiban of Buraimi, and by the 1940s were considered to be independent of Muscat. Together with other Na'im in Buraimi, the Khawatir once again came under Saudi influence in the 1950s, leading to their participation in the Buraimi dispute.

Lorimer, in 1906, identified some 500 Khawatir living as Bedouin in the Jiri Plain, and these would have been relatively wealthy, with 800 camels, 70 donkeys, 1,500 sheep and goats and 100 cattle. A further 150 houses of Khawatir were settled at Hafit to the south east of Buraimi, with 900 date palms, 1,000 sheep and goats and 200 camels. They frequently shared inland water resources with the Ghafalah.

== Dhaid ==
As well as Buraimi, the Khawatir also settled in the Sharjah dependency of Dhaid, where they subsisted frequently uneasily with their Bani Qitab neighbours, a number of disputes culminating with the Khawatir prevailing in 1927, with suspicions of interference with the oasis' water supply arising because of the unusually poor date crop that year. The following year, a settlement conducted by the Na'im chiefs of this issue led to the ascension of the deposed Sheikh of Sharjah, Khalid bin Ahmed Al Qasimi to rule Dhaid. Khalid enlisted the support of the Khawatir (as well as the Bani Kaab, the Bani Qitab and the Sheikh of Hamriyah) in an attempt to invade a retake control of Sharjah, which was averted by the British. Khalid would go on to become ruler of Kalba on the death of his father in law, Sheikh Said bin Hamad Al Qasimi.
