= Na'im =

Bedouin tribe of the United Arab Emirates

Na'im النعيم (in Arabic)
- Arab tribe
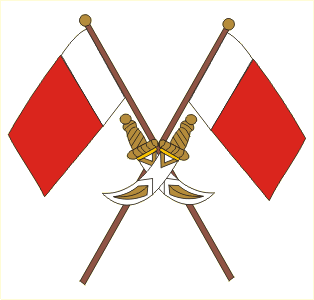
- Ethnicity: Arab
- Location: United Arab Emirates (Ajman, Abu Dhabi, Sharjah, Ras Al Khaimah, Dubai); Oman; Qatar; Bahrain
- Descended from: Ansar (Islam)
- Branches: Al Bu Kharaiban, Al Bu Shamis
- Language: Arabic
- Religion: Islam
- Surnames: Al Nuaimi

The Na'im (Arabic: نعيم) (singular Al Nuaimi Arabic: النعيمي) is a traditionally Ghafiri Arab tribe in the United Arab Emirates. The tribe is also present in other gulf countries.

Many of the tribes that constituted the population of the coastal towns and villages along the Gulf possessed Bedouin sections that shared portions of the surrounding semi-desert territory. The most significant tribe in the hinterland was the Na'im, owing both to their numerical strength and to the fact that they regarded the region as their principal center. In addition, the Na'im were widely distributed across Trucial Oman and the Sultanate of Oman. In the period following the Second World War, the combined Bedouin and settled population of the Na'im was estimated at approximately 5,000 individuals, with the capacity to mobilize around 2,000 armed men. According to the Gazetteer of the Persian Gulf, the tribe numbered about 13,000 at the beginning of the twentieth century. However, its population and political influence had been in decline for several decades, largely as a result of persistent internal divisions among its sub-tribes. Lorimer records that around 10,500 non-nomadic Na'im resided in the region at the time, excluding those who had migrated to Qatar and Bahrain in earlier generations. Of these, approximately 4,500 lived in the Sultanate of Oman, 3,500 in the shaikhdoms of the Trucial Coast, and 2,500 in the district referred to as “Independent Oman,” in addition to an estimated 2,500 Bedouin members of the tribe.

The Na'im are divided into three sections, the Al Bu Kharaiban, the Khawatir and the Al Bu Shamis (singular Al Shamsi). It is from the former section that the current Rulers of the Emirate of Ajman are drawn. The Al Bu Shamis have become virtually independent and are closely associated with the Al Bu Falah of Abu Dhabi. Despite this de facto independence, the shaikhs of the Al Bu Shamis periodically affirmed their continued recognition of the tamimah (supreme authority) of the Na'im as a whole. The traditional heart of Na'im territory was the oasis town of Buraimi and nearby Al Ain, where the Ghafiri Na'im’s predominant expansion came at the expense of the Dhawahir tribe, but also rubbed up against the Bani Yas and the allied Manasir, both of whom were classified as Hinawi within the framework of Omani political affiliations. The tribe followed the Ghafiri tradition and supported the Omani Iman, Yarub, in his bid to control Oman in 1723.

Although the Na'im were linked to the growing Wahhabi influence in the Buraimi area and adopted the doctrine unlike most tribes in the region, they allied with other forces of the Al Bu Falah ruler Khalifah bin Shakhbut in 1848 and Sultan Azzan bin Qais in 1869 to evict the Wahhabis from Buraimi. Following these campaigns, the Na'im subsequently occupied many of the forts around Buraimi. The tamimah of the Na'im established residence in the fort of Buraimi village and was regarded as the Sultan’s representative in the area, receiving a regular allowance analogous to that provided to other walis. However, following the death of Zayed the Great, the Na'im once again came under Saudi influence, leading to their participation in the Buraimi dispute.

== Origins ==
In 1818, according to the 'British Assistant Political Agent in Turkish Arabia', Captain Robert Taylor, the Na'im numbered some 20,000 men in Buraimi and 400 in Ajman.

By the beginning of the 20th century, the Na'im were spread across much of the area of the modern-day UAE, with families settled in Ajman, Dhaid, Hamriyah, Sharjah, Hafit, Heerah and Ras Al Khaimah. Some 5,500 Na'im at the time lived in and around the Buraimi oasis. The villages of Buraimi, Hamasa, and Saarah were predominantly occupied by members of the Na'im, with around 300 houses in total. Southeast of the oasis, Na'im settlements were largely associated with the Al Bu Shamis section, including Hafit and Qabil at the southern base of Jabal Hafit. A further 660 houses of Na'im were located at Dhank, in Dhahirah, Oman. Additional communities were located in Sanainah, south of the entrance to Wadi Jizi, which connects through the mountains to the Batinah coast, where some Na'im resided in Sanqar. Elsewhere, settled Na'im populations were found in Ajman town, comprising approximately 25 houses. In the small port of Hamriyah, a dependency of Sharjah, the headman and around 250 of its 300 houses were members of the Darawishah subsection of the Al Bu Shamis division. This subsection also dominated Hirah, another Sharjah dependency, with approximately 250 Na'im households. In Sharjah town itself, the Na'im formed a significant portion of the settled population, including 100 Darawishah houses, while other Sharjah territories, such as Daid, were home to 30 Khawatir households. Of the estimated 2,500 nomadic members of the Na'im, approximately 1,600 were typically present in Trucial Oman and its hinterland, regarding the district of Al Jau as their principal base. They shared the Dhahirah region with several Omani tribes and the Khatam area with the Bani Yas and the Dhawahir. Although the Na'im did not maintain permanent settlements in Wadi Hatta, the Bedouin Na'im and their tamimah at Buraimi customarily provided protection to the inhabitants of Masfut, whose population was in conflict with the Dubai-aligned community of Hajarain. At the time, the Na'im were mostly settled in towns or in pastoral communities, although in areas later identified as part of Ras Al Khaimah territory, the Khawatir were Bedouins roaming a dar consisting of the Jiri plain, shared with the Ghafalah and other groups, and the Hafit area with 800 camels, 1,500 sheep and goats and some 100 cattle. Elsewhere in the district between the mountains and the coast, the Bedouin Na'im gradually lost their former predominance to the Bani Kaab, who, together with the Bani Qitab, emerged as their principal rivals. The Bedouin Na'im maintained herds of camels as well as flocks of sheep and goats, and, owing to the availability of grazing land and water sources near their date gardens, rarely travelled far from their customary areas and did not venture into the deep sands. For this reason, the UK Memorial characterized them as “pastoral” rather than fully Bedouin.

Competition for grazing and other resources often spilled over into conflict between the tribes and the Na'im were often involved in disputes and open warfare with other tribes, including the Bani Kaab, Bani Qitab and Al Bu Falah. However, the Al Bu Shamis remained generally on good terms with other tribes, particularly the Duru and Bani Qitab. With the continuing decline of the Na'im tribal federation, the Al Bu Shamis maintained an almost completely separate identity and, in fact, the Al Bu Shamis leader of Al Heera – Sheikh Abdulrahman bin Muhammad Al Shamsi was often in strong disagreement, if not war, with the Na'imi Al Bu Kharaiban Ruler of Ajman.

== Masfout ==
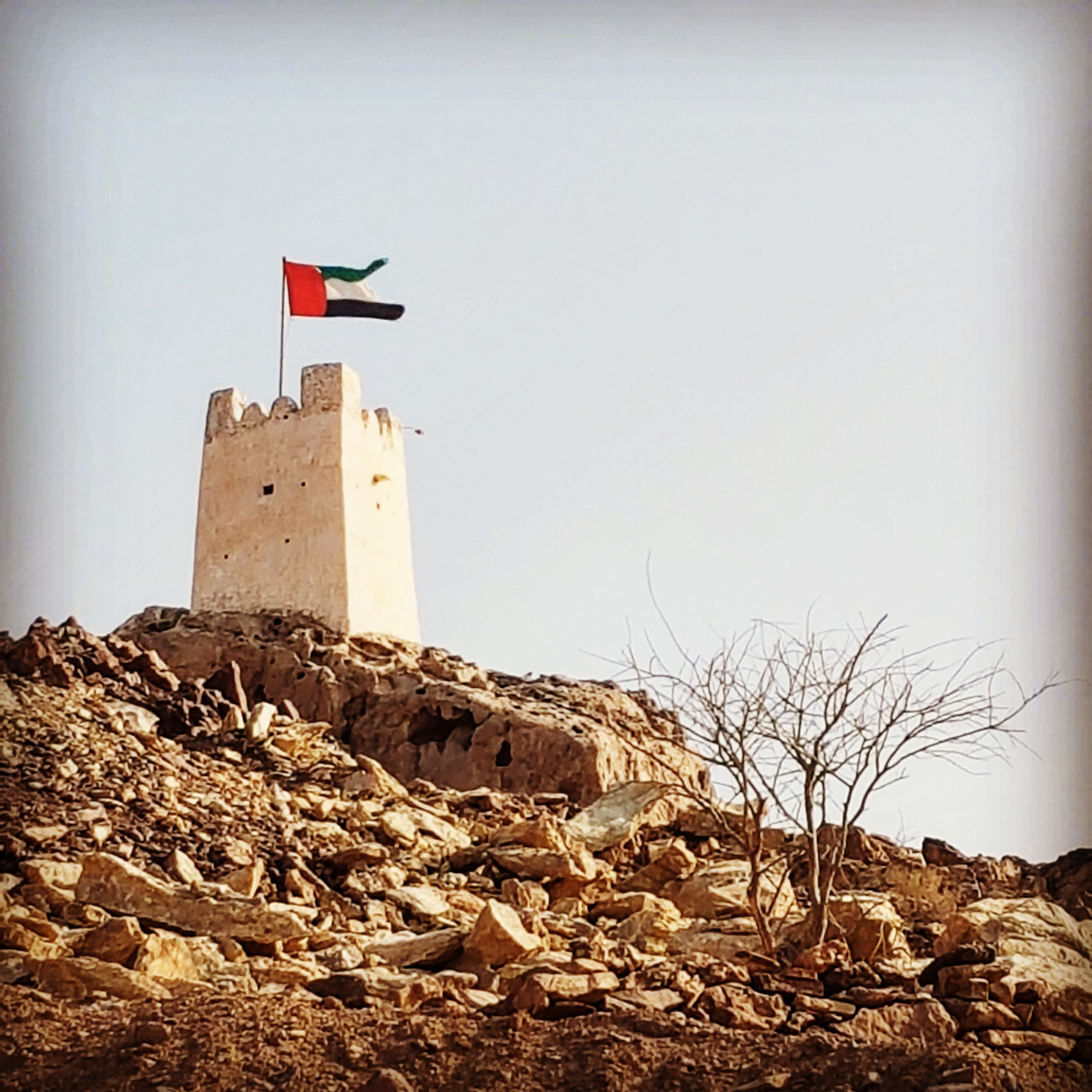
The Fort at Masfout

Masfout, a mountainous village in the Wadi Hatta, had long been home to the Na'im. They found themselves under threat in 1905 when the Bani Qitab built a fort in the wadi and started to harass caravans passing through the pass to the Omani Batina coast. Appealing to Zayed bin Khalifa Al Nahyah of Abu Dhabi, and following a meeting of the Trucial Sheikhs in Dubai in April of that year, they gained Zayed's support (against the young and ambitious Sheikh of Umm Al Quwain, Rashid bin Ahmad Al Mualla, who supported the Bani Qitab) and retained Masfout. The Na'im of Masfout were in almost constant conflict with the people of Hajarain, which later became a dependency of Dubai – today known as Hatta. However, they considered themselves independent of the rulers of Ajman.

In 1948, Masfout was seized from its Nuaimi Sheikh, Saqr bin Sultan Al Hamouda, by Sheikh Rashid bin Humaid Al Nuaimi III of Ajman, following a period of decline and conflict with neighbouring Hajarain (now known as Hatta), when Hamouda was unable to raise a force to oppose Rashid. Masfout has been part of the Emirate of Ajman since, albeit an exclave.

A period of uncertainty followed as the various Sheikhs of the region attempted to jostle for influence in order to sign petroleum concessions, with the Sultan in Muscat and the Saudis paying tribute to the Na'im in Buraimi and other local tribes in the area in return for fealty which often turned out to be short-lived. This activity among the rulers and tribes eventually led to the Buraimi dispute, where some 200 Na’im, Al Bu Shamis and Bani Kaab fought against the British. Following the conflict, a number of Na'im were resettled in Saudi Arabia.

At the turn of the nineteenth century, the Na'im were arguably the dominant force in the area west of the Hajar Mountains, with some 13,000 members and the ability to raise at least 2,000 fighting men. By the 1940s, this had dropped to just 300–400 rifles and the tribe was split into factions.

=== Qatar ===
The tribe were reported as being one of the most powerful tribes in Qatar in an 1890 report by the British government. In J. G. Lorimer's Gazetteer of the Persian Gulf published in 1904, he described the Na'im as "a Bedouin tribe who grazed their cattle on pastures surrounding Zubarah in 1873." He stated that 60 or 70 of the tribe's branch in Qatar had a hereditary attachment to the Bahraini emir. In 1937, a dispute over Zubarah took place between Bahrain and Qatar. The Na'im in Qatar split into sections, the Ramzan, who supported the Qatari emir Abdullah bin Jassim Al Thani, and the main section, Al Jabr, who had pledged allegiance to the ruler of Bahrain. In July 1937, Sheikh Abdullah Al Thani reported to the British agency that he was to take action against the Na'im who were residing in Ath Thaqab over their perceived violation of the country's laws. For their part, the leader of the Na'im claimed that Abdullah Al Thani had "stolen their cattle" and had set fire to the Na'im's houses and villages before and after his decree.

Hostilities came to a boiling point when an armed force sent by Abdullah Al Thani, numbering in the hundreds, confronted around 60 armed men of the Na'im who were encamped inside Ath Thaqab Fort. According to Rashid bin Mohammed, upon encountering the Qatari loyalists, he and his troops surrendered, but four of his men were shot and killed anyway. Abdullah Al Thani's forces continued to capture the fort and occupy the villages of Ath Thaqab, Freiha, Al-ʽArish and Al Khuwayr, whose inhabitants were among the Na'im supporters. After the Na'im had conceded defeat, Abdullah Al Thani confiscated most of their weapons, including 40 rifles from the people of Ath Thaqab, and some of their livestock. As a result of this conflict, about 1,000 members of the Na'im tribe went into exile in Bahrain, with some returning after the Second World War.

== Notable people ==
- Huda al-Naimi — medical physicist and writer from Qatar
- Ali Al-Naimi — Saudi politician who was the Minister of Petroleum and Mineral Resources from 1995 to 2016
- Abdulla Majid Al Naimi — Bahraini formerly detained in Guantanamo Bay
- Majed bin Ali Al-Naimi — Bahraini academic
- Mashel Al Naimi — Qatari motorcycle racer
- Mubaraka Al-Naimi — Qatari tennis player
- Humaid bin Rashid Al Nuaimi III — Emirati royal, politician, who serves as the ruler of the Emirate of Ajman and a member of the Federal Supreme Council
- Abdullah Al Nuaimi — Emirati engineer and politician
- Rashid bin Humaid Al Nuaimi III — Emirati royal, politician and a founder of the United Arab Emirates who served as the 9th ruler of Ajman and ruled the emirate from 1928 until 1981
- Rashid Abdullah Al Nuaimi — former foreign minister of the United Arab Emirates.
- Abdulrahman al-Nuaimi — Bahraini politician and opposition leader
- Buthaina Bint Ali Al Jabr Al Nuaimi — Qatari Minister of Social Development and Family
- Sultan Al-Nuaimi — Emirati professional boxer
- Ammar bin Humaid Al Nuaimi — Crown Prince of Ajman, one of the United Arab Emirates, and chairman of the Ajman Executive Council
- Issa bin Saad Al Jafali Al Nuaimi — Qatari Attorney General
- Fatima bint Rashid Al Nuaimi — Emirati Ajman royal and a member of the Al Nuaimi and Al Sharqi families
- Humaid bin Abdulaziz Al Nuaimi — Ruler of Ajman, one of the Trucial States which today form the United Arab Emirates (UAE), from 1910–1928
- Abd Al-Rahman al-Nuaimi — Qatari Islamic advocate, financier, and co-founder of the Alkarama human rights NGO
- Mansoor Al-Nuaimi — Omani footballer who plays for Al-Nahda Club
- Humaid bin Rashid Al Nuaimi II — ruler of Ajman, one of the Trucial States which today form the United Arab Emirates (UAE), from 1891–1900
- Talal Al-Nuaimi — a United Arab Emirates professional basketball player
- Abdelaziz bin Rashid Al Nuaimi — Ruler of Ajman, one of the Trucial States which now form the United Arab Emirates (UAE), from 1841 to 1848
- Rashid bin Humaid Al Nuaimi — Ruler of Ajman, one of the Trucial States which today form the United Arab Emirates (UAE), from 1816–1838
- Hamad Al Nuaimi — Emirati footballer

== See also ==
- Al Nuaimi for further information on the House of Nuaimi, ruling family of the Emirate of Ajman
