= Hamriyah Port =

Coordinates: 25.470°N 55.487°E

Hamriyah Port is deep water seaport and ancillary facilities located in the Hamriyah Free Zone in Sharjah, United Arab Emirates.

The port is administered by the Department of Seaports and Customs, Government of Sharjah.

The port is part of a free trade zone for companies and a center for export and re-export to other world markets. Principal deepwater port activities include petrochemical exports, general cargo and two container terminals with alongside berth depths of 14 metres. An inner harbour with berth depths of between five and seven metres provides supporting services include ship repairs, dry docks and minor ship building.
