= Al Khan =

Suburb and residential area in Sharjah, UAE

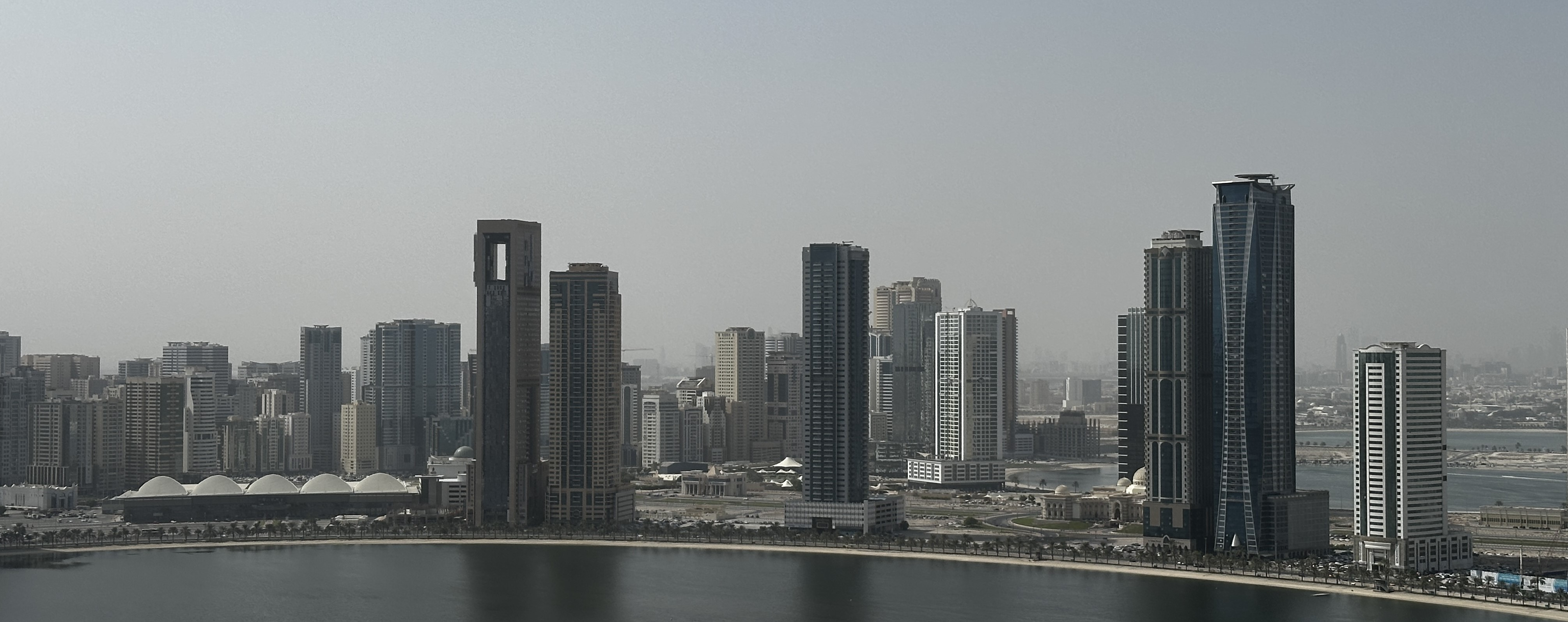

- Location within United Arab Emirates
- Coordinates: 25°19′55″N 55°21′32″E
- Country: United Arab Emirates
- Emirate: Sharjah
- Elevation: 7 m (23 ft)

Al Khan is a southern suburb of the city of Sharjah, United Arab Emirates. The suburb is located on the Al Khan Bay, which serves as a boundary between Sharjah and Dubai. Until recently, the area was deserted and home to a collection of crumbling traditional coral and adobe houses, but it now houses the Sharjah Aquarium. A number of the older buildings are being restored to create a heritage area.

== History ==
Around the start of the 20th century, Al Khan was administered by a tribal ruler and consisted of some 75 pearling boats and a settlement containing families of the Al Bu Mahair, Mazari and Manasir tribes. A British man-of-war was called to the area in 1917 following an argument between the ruler of Sharjah and the headman of Al Khan, Muhammad bin Ubaid bin Jarash, over absconding debtors from other pearling communities taking refuge in the township. The uneasy relations between Al Khan and Sharjah continued until after 1934, when the Ruler of Sharjah appointed his brother, Mohammad, as Wali over the township.

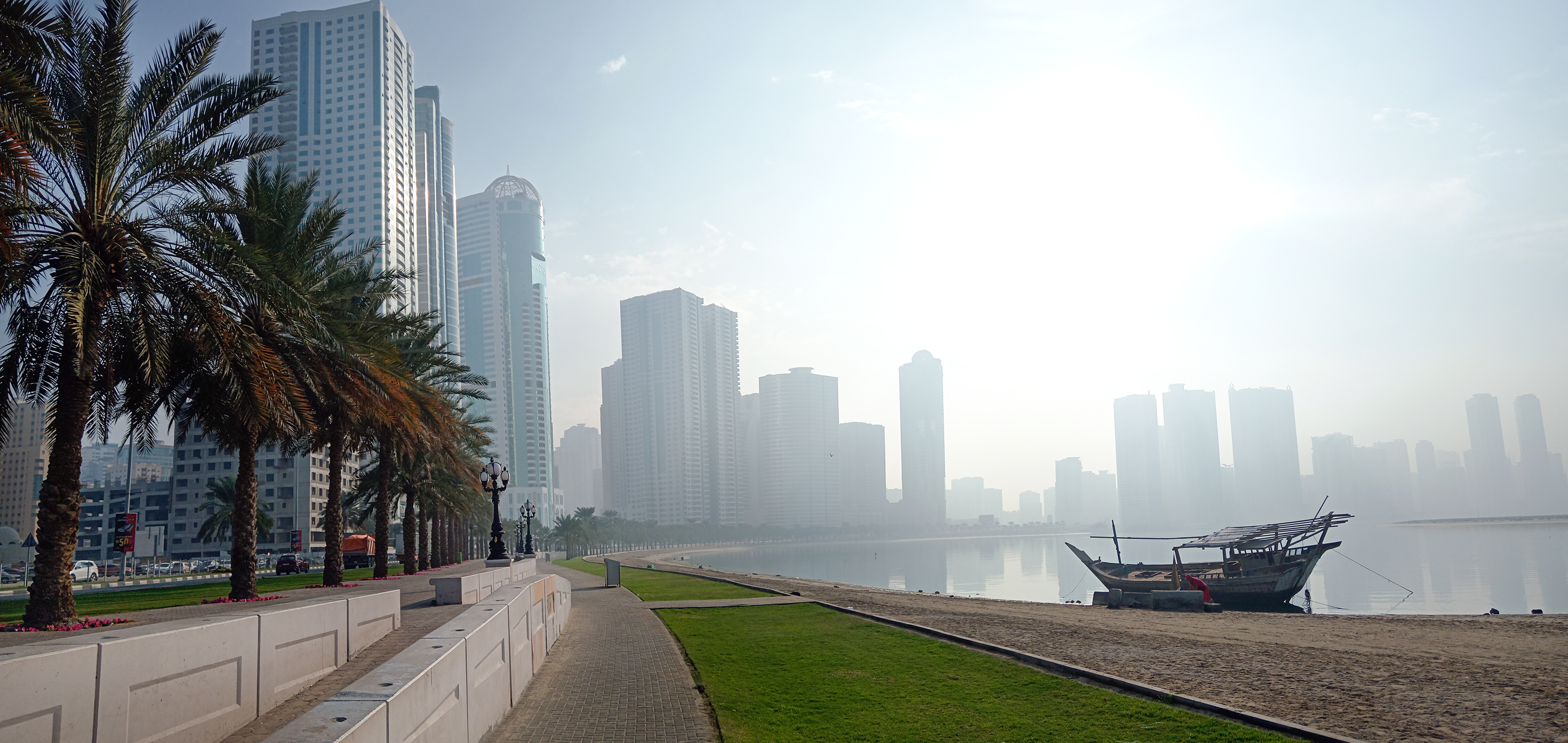
Al Khan

Al Khan was the scene of a firefight between the leaders of the rebellious Majlis movement and forces loyal to the Ruler of Dubai in February 1940. After several days of fighting, a truce was effected by the mediation of the Rulers of Umm Al Quwain, Ajman and Ras Al Khaimah on 29 March.

In 2011, archaeological finds of Neolithic and medieval times were made at Al Khan. It seemed that the tradition of using the shoreline of Al Khan for mooring fishing boats and enjoying a cookout, had been kept up for thousands of years from the Neolithic age to the present day. The survey being carried out by the Maritime Archaeology Stewardship Trust, has recovered the remains of houses, courtyards, and remnants. According to the Abu Dhabi Authority for Culture & Heritage, the project aims at conserving the UAE's coastal heritage.

== Geography ==
Al Khan lies between the emirates of Dubai and Sharjah.
