= Family tree of Emirati monarchs =

The following charts below are the family trees of the rulers of the seven emirates of the United Arab Emirates from the 18th century to present day. The House of Nahyan rules Abu Dhabi, the House of Maktoum rules Dubai, the House of Qasimi rules Sharjah and Ras Al Khaimah, the House of Sharqi rules Fujairah, the House of Mualla rules Umm Al Quwain, and the House of Nuaimi rules Ajman. The ruler of Abu Dhabi generally holds the presidency of the UAE and the ruler of Dubai holds the vice presidency and premiership.

== Family Tree of Abu Dhabi monarchs ==
Current ruler of Abu Dhabi
Previous ruler of Abu Dhabi

Dhiyab bin Isa^{(1)} r. 1761–1793
Shakhbut bin Dhiyab^{(2)} r. 1793–1816
Muhammad bin Shakhbut^{(3)} r. 1816–1818	Tahnun bin Shakhbut^{(4)} r. 1818–1833	Khalifa bin Shakhbut^{(5)} r. 1833–1845
Saeed bin Tahnun^{(6)} r. 1845–1855	Zayed bin Khalifa^{(7)} r. 1855–1909
Tahnoun bin Zayed^{(8)} r. 1909–1912	Hamdan bin Zayed^{(9)} r. 1912–1922	Sultan bin Zayed^{(10)} r. 1922-1926	Saqr bin Zayed^{(11)} r. 1926–1928	Khalifa bin Zayed; Al Nahyan
Mohammed bin Khalifa; Al Nahyan
Shakhbut bin Sultan^{(12)} r. 1928–1966	Fatima bint Mubarak; Al Ketbi	Zayed bin Sultan^{(13)} r. 1966–2004; President^{(1)} t. 1971–2004	Hassa bint Mohammed; Al Nahyan
Mohamed bin Zayed^{(15)} r. 2022–present President^{(3)} t. 2022–present	Khalifa bin Zayed^{(14)} r. 2004–2022; President^{(2)} t. 2004–2022
Khaled bin Mohamed; Al Nahyan

== Family Tree of Dubai monarchs ==
Vice President
Prime Minister
Current Emir of Dubai
Previous Emir of Dubai

Butti bin Suhail; Al Maktoum
Maktoum bin Butti^{(1)} r. 1833–1852	Saeed bin Butti^{(2)} r. 1852–1859
Hasher bin Maktoum^{(3)} r. 1859–1886	Rashid bin Maktoum^{(4)} r. 1886–1894	Suhail bin Maktoum; Al Maktoum
Maktoum bin Hasher^{(5)} r. 1894–1906	Butti bin Suhail^{(6)} r. 1906–1912
Saeed bin Maktoum^{(7)} r. 1912–1958	Juma bin Maktoum; Al Maktoum
Rashid bin Saeed^{(8)} r. 1958–1990^{(1)} r. 1971–1990 r. 1979–1990	Maktoum bin Juma; Al Maktoum	Thani bin Juma; Al Maktoum
House of Sharqi
Maktoum bin Rashid^{(9)} r. 1990–2006^{(2)} r. 1990–2006 r. 1971–1979, 1990–2006	Mohammed bin Rashid^{(10)} r. 2006–present^{(3)} r. 2006–present r. 2006–present	Hind bint Maktoum; Al Maktoum	Fatima bint Thani; Al Maktoum	Hamad bin Mohammed; Fujairah^{(4)} r. 1974–present
Hamdan bin Mohammed; Al Maktoum

== Family Tree of Sharjah and Ras Al Khaimah monarchs ==
House of Qasimi

Rahma; Ras; Al Khaimah^{(1)} r. 1708-1731
Matar; Ras; Al Khaimah^{(2)} r. 1731-1747
Rashid; Ras; Al Khaimah^{(3)} Sharjah^{(1)} r. 1747-1777
Saqr I Ras; Al Khaimah^{(4)} Sharjah^{(2)} r. 1777-1803
Sultan I Ras; Al Khaimah^{(5)} r. 1803-1808, 1820-1866; Sharjah^{(3)} r. 1803-1840, 1840-1866	Rahma bin Saqr; Al Qasimi
Saqr II; Sharjah^{(4)} r. 1840	Khalid I Ras; Al Khaimah^{(8)} r. 1867-1868; Sharjah^{(5)} r. 1866-1868	Ibrahim; Ras; Al Khaimah^{(7)} r. 1866-1867; Sharjah^{(7)} r. 1869-1871	Salim; Ras; Al Khaimah^{(9)} r. 1868-1869; Sharjah^{(6)} r. 1868-1883	Ahmad bin Sultan; Al Qasimi	Abdullah bin Sultan; Al Qasimi	Hassan; Ras; Al Khaimah^{(6)} r. 1814-1820
Saqr III; Sharjah^{(7)} r. 1883-1914	Sultan II; Ras; Al Khaimah^{(12)} r. 1921-1948	Mohammed bin Salim; Al Qasimi	Khalid II; Ras; Al Khaimah^{(11)} r. 1914-1921; Sharjah^{(8)} r. 1914-1924	Humaid; Ras; Al Khaimah^{(10)} r. 1869-1900
Sultan II; Sharjah^{(9)} r. 1924-1951	Muhammad; Sharjah^{(10)} r. 1951	Saqr II; Ras; Al Khaimah^{(13)} r. 1948-2010
Saqr IV; Sharjah^{(11)} r. 1951-1965	Khalid III; Sharjah^{(12)} r. 1965-1972	Saqr V Sharjah^{(13)} r. 1972	Abdul Aziz; Sharjah^{(15)} r. 1987	Sultan III; Sharjah^{(14)} r. 1972-1987, 1987-present	Saud; Ras; Al Khaimah^{(14)} r. 2010-present
Muhammad bin Sultan; Al Qasimi	Mohammed bin Saud; Al Qasimi
Sultan bin Muhammad; Al Qasimi

== Family Tree of Fujairah monarchs ==
House of Sharqi

Hamad I^{(1)} r. 1879-1936	House of Nuaimi
Saif^{(2)} r. 1936-1938	Mohammed^{(3)} r. 1938-1974	Fatima bint Rashid; Al Nuaimi
House of Maktoum
Hamad II^{(4)} r. 1974–present	Fatima bint Thani; Al Maktoum
Mohammed bin Hamad; Al Sharqi

== Family Tree of Umm Al Quwain monarchs ==
House of Mualla

Rashid I^{(1)} r. 1768-1820
Abdullah I^{(2)} r. 1820-1853
Ali^{(3)} r. 1853-1873	Ahmad I^{(4)} r. 1873-1904
Rashid II^{(5)} r. 1904–1922	Ibrahim bin Ahmad; Al Mualla
Abdullah II^{(6)} r. 1922-1923	Ahmad II^{(8)} r. 1929–1981	Hamad^{(7)} r. 1923-1929
Rashid III^{(9)} r. 1981-2009
Saud^{(10)} r. 2009-present
Rashid bin Saud; Al Mualla

== Family Tree of Ajman Monarchs ==
House of Nuaimi

Rashid I^{(1)} r. 1816-1838
Humaid I^{(2)} r. 1838-1841, 1848-1864	Abdulaziz I^{(3)} r. 1841-1848
Rashid II^{(4)} r. 1864-1891
Humaid II^{(5)} r. 1891-1900
Abdulaziz II^{(6)} r. 1900-1910
Humaid III^{(7)} r. 1910-1928
Rashid III^{(8)} r. 1928-1981	House of Sharqi
Humaid IV^{(9)} r. 1981-present	Fatima bint Rashid; Al Nuaimi	Mohammed; Fujairah^{(3)} r. 1938-1974/5
Ammar bin Humaid; Al Nuaimi
