= Royal families of the United Arab Emirates =

The royal families of the United Arab Emirates consist of the six ruling families of the seven Emirates.

- The Nahyan (branch of the House of Al Falahi) are the ruling family of Abu Dhabi.
- The Maktoum (branch of the House of Al Falasi) are the ruling family of Dubai.
- The Al Qasimi (also spelled Al Qassimi) families rule two of the seven emirates: Sharjah and Ras Al Khaimah.
- The Al Nuaimi are the ruling family of Ajman.
- The Al Mualla are the ruling family of Umm Al Quwain.
- The Al Sharqi are the ruling family of Fujairah.

== Nahyan dynasty – Abu Dhabi ==
- Sheikh Dhiyab bin Isa Al Nahyan (1761–1793)
- Sheikh Shakhbut bin Dhiyab Al Nahyan (1793–1816)
- Sheikh Muhammad bin Shakhbut Al Nahyan (1816–1818)
- Sheikh Tahnun bin Shakhbut Al Nahyan (1818–1833)
- Sheikh Khalifa bin Shakhbut Al Nahyan (1833–1845)
- Sheikh Saeed bin Tahnun Al Nahyan (1845–1855)
- Sheikh Zayed bin Khalifa Al Nahyan (1855–1909)
- Sheikh Tahnun bin Zayed Al Nahyan (1909–1912)
- Sheikh Hamdan bin Zayed Al Nahyan (1912–1922)
- Sheikh Sultan bin Zayed Al Nahyan (1922–1926)
- Sheikh Saqr bin Zayed Al Nahyan (1926–1928)
- Sheikh Shakhbut bin Sultan Al Nahyan (1928–1966)
- Sheikh Zayed bin Sultan Al Nahyan (1966–2004), founder of the United Arab Emirates
- Sheikh Khalifa bin Zayed Al Nahyan (2004–2022), President of UAE and Ruler of Abu Dhabi.
- Sheikh Mohammad bin Zayed Al Nahyan, President of UAE and Ruler of Abu Dhabi and Commander of UAE Armed Forces.
- Sheikh Hamdan bin Zayed bin Sultan Al Nahyan Emir's Representative in the Western Region of Abu Dhabi.
- Sheikh Hamdan bin Mubarak Al Nahyan, Minister of Higher Education & Research Of Science.
- Sheikh Abdullah Bin Zayed Al Nahyan, Minister of Foreign Affairs.
- Sheikh Mansour bin Zayed Al Nahyan, Minister of Presidential Affairs.

== Maktoum dynasty – Dubai ==
- Late Sheikh Rashid bin Saeed Al Maktoum, former ruler of Dubai
- Late Sheikh Maktoum bin Rashid Al Maktoum, Vice President and Prime Minister of UAE; Ruler of Dubai
- Emir Sheikh Mohammed bin Rashid Al Maktoum, Vice President and Prime Minister of UAE; Ruler of Dubai
- Crown Prince Sheikh Hamdan bin Mohammed bin Rashid Al Maktoum, Crown Prince of Dubai
- Deputy Ruler Sheikh Hamdan bin Rashid Al Maktoum, UAE Minister of Finance
- Deputy Ruler Sheikh Maktoum bin Mohammed bin Rashid Al Maktoum
- Sheikh Ahmed bin Saeed Al Maktoum, chairman of the airline Emirates

== Al Qasimi dynasty – Sharjah ==
- Sheikh Khalid bin Sultan Al Qasimi (1866 – 14 April 1868)
- Sheikh Salim bin Sultan Al Qasimi (14 April 1868 – March 1883)
- Sheikh Ibrahim bin Sultan Al Qasimi (1869–1871)
- Sheikh Saqr bin Khalid Al Qasimi (March 1883 – 1914)
- Sheikh Khalid bin Ahmad Al Qasimi (13 April 1914 – 21 November 1924)
- Sheikh Sultan bin Saqr Al Qasimi (1781–1866)
- Sheikh Sultan bin Saqr Al Qasimi II (21 November 1924 – 1951)
- Sheikh Mohammed bin Saqer Al Qasimi ( 1951 – May 1951)
- Sheikh Saqr bin Sultan Al Qasimi (May 1951 – 24 June 1965), first time ruling
- Sheikh Khalid bin Mohammed Al Qasimi (24 June 1965 – 24 January 1972)
- Sheikh Saqr bin Sultan Al Qasimi (25 January 1972– 1972), second time ruling
- Sheikh Sultan bin Muhammad Al Qasimi (1972 – 17 June 1987)
- Sheikh Abdulaziz bin Mohammed Al-Qasimi (17–23 June 1987)
- Sheikh Sultan bin Muhammad Al Qasimi (23 June 1987 – present)

== Al Qasimi dynasty – Ras Al Khaimah ==
- Sheikh Sultan bin Saqr Al Qasimi (1781–1866)
- Sheikh Ibrahim bin Sultan Al Qasimi (1866 – May 1867)
- Sheikh Khalid bin Sultan Al Qasimi (May 1867 – 14 April 1868)
- Sheikh Salim bin Ali Al Qasimi (14 April 1868 – 1869)
- Sheikh Humaid bin Abdullah Al Qasimi (1869 – August 1900)
- Sheikh Khalid bin Ahmad Al Qasimi (1914–1921)
- Sheikh Sultan bin Salim Al Qasimi (19 July 1921 – February 1948)
- Sheikh Saqr bin Mohammad Al Qassimi (February 1948 – 27 October 2010)
- Sheikh Saud bin Saqr Al Qasimi (27 October 2010 – present)
- Sheikh Faisal bin Sultan Al Qasimi, first Under Secretary of the Ministry of Defence
- Sheikh Fahim bin Sultan Al Qasimi, former GCC general secretary and minister
- Sheikh Khalid bin Faisal bin Sultan Al Qassimi, Abu Dhabi Motorsport ambassador and world rally driver

== Al Nuaimi dynasty – Ajman ==
- Sheikh Rashid bin Humaid Al Nuaimi (1816–1838)
- Sheikh Humaid bin Rashid Al Nuaimi (1838–1841)
- Sheikh Abdelaziz bin Rashid Al Nuaimi (1841–1848)
- Sheikh Humaid bin Rashid Al Nuaimi (1848–1864)
- Sheikh Rashid bin Humaid Al Nuaimi II (1864–1891)
- Sheikh Humaid bin Rashid Al Nuaimi II (1891–1900)
- Sheikh Abdulaziz bin Humaid Al Nuaimi (1900–1910)
- Sheikh Humaid bin Abdulaziz Al Nuaimi (1910–1928)
- Sheikh Rashid bin Humaid Al Nuaimi III (1928–1981)
- Sheikh Humaid bin Rashid Al Nuaimi III (1981–present)

== Al Mualla dynasty – Umm Al Quwain ==
- Sheikh Rashid bin Majid Al Mualla (1768–1820)
- Sheikh Abdullah bin Rashid Al Mualla (1820–1853)
- Sheikh Ali bin Abdullah Al Mualla (1853–1873)
- Sheikh Ahmad bin Abdullah Al Mualla (1873–1904)
- Sheikh Rashid bin Ahmad Al Mualla (1904–1922)
- Sheikh Abdullah bin Rashid Al Mualla II (1922–1923)
- Sheikh Hamad bin Ibrahim Al Mualla (1923–1929)
- Sheikh Ahmad bin Rashid Al Mualla (1929–1981)
- Sheikh Rashid bin Ahmad Al Mualla II (1981–2009)
- Sheikh Saud bin Rashid Al Mualla (2009–present)
- Sheikh Abdullah bin Rashid Al Mualla III (present deputy ruler)

== Al Sharqi dynasty – Fujairah ==
- Sheikh Hamad bin Abdullah Al Sharqi
- Sheikh Saif bin Hamad Al Sharqi
- Sheikh Mohammed bin Hamad Al Sharqi (1908–1974)
- Sheikh Hamad bin Mohammed Al Sharqi (1975–present)
- Sheikh Mohammed bin Hamad bin Mohammed Al Sharqi, crown prince of Fujairah

== See also ==
- List of rulers of individual Emirates of the United Arab Emirates
