= Sultan bin Salim Al Qasimi =

Sheikh Sultan bin Salim Al Qasimi
- His Highess Sheikh/ Ruler of Ras Al Khaimah

Ruler of Ras Al Khaimah
- Reign: 1921–1948
- Predecessor: Khalid bin Ahmad Al Qasimi
- Successor: Saqr bin Mohammed Al Qasimi
- Died: 1951
- House: Al Qasimi
- Father: Salim bin Sultan Al Qasimi

His Highness Sheikh Sultan bin Salim Al Qasimi was Ruler of Ras Al Khaimah from 1921–1948. His long and turbulent rule was characterised by internecine family and tribal disputes and he was finally removed as Ruler in a 1948 coup.

== Accession ==
Sultan bin Salim took over as wali or governor of Ras Al Khaimah when his brother Muhammad handed over control in July 1919. Sultan's father, Sheikh Salim bin Sultan Al Qasimi had managed affairs in Ras Al Khaimah since 1910 and had consolidated power to the point where the emirate was in all but name independent of Sharjah.

Salim died in August 1919 and Sultan bin Salim petitioned the British for Ras Al Khaimah to be recognised as a Trucial State and himself as its Ruler. In December 1919, the Political Resident, Arthur Prescott Trevor, visited Ras Al Khaimah and concluded that Sultan was too young to maintain his precarious grip on power in light of the strong factions supporting his brother Muhammad and decided to withhold recognition. Revisiting the question the following year, Trevor found Sultan had consolidated control and recommended the Government of India recognise him as Ruler, which it did on 7 June 1921, making Ras Al Khaimah the sixth Trucial State and establishing its independence both from Sharjah and its Ruler, Sheikh Khalid bin Ahmad Al Qasimi.

== Rule ==
Sultan bin Salim was only too aware of his family's turbulent past and moved to not only consolidate power but centralise it along with the revenues accruing to the Ruler. In 1906, J. G. Lorimer had estimated the revenues of the town at some 6,300 Rupees from pearling and 800 Rupees from customs duties. Ras Al Khaimah and its dependencies (Jazirat Al Hamra, Khatt, Rams and Dhayah, and Sha'am) also benefited from unusually rich agriculture and Ras Al Khaimah town alone had 15,600 date trees. This modest income had many claimants among members of the ruling family and Sultan was quick to deny them: in 1927 he had one of his cousins exiled after a bitter dispute over Sultan's refusal to pay allowances to family members.

In 1928, Sultan bin Salim found himself dragged into the dispute between the former Ruler of Sharjah, Sheikh Khalid Bin Ahmed Al Qasimi (from whom he had gained independence) and the current Ruler, Sheikh Sultan bin Saqr Al Qasimi, when the Sheikhs of the Na'im and Bani Ka'ab asked him to intercede and take over the inland oasis town of Dhaid on Khalid's behalf. The town had been formally ceded to Khalid by Sultan of Sharjah, but armed men loyal to Sultan remained there and Sultan bin Salim faced being brought into an expensive operation which would have yielded no revenue and precious little gain in influence. Furthermore, it threatened to bring him into conflict with the Ruler of Sharjah. He avoided being embroiled when Khalid entered Dhaid and took control in July 1928.

His attempt to tax the fiercely independent Habus tribe of Rash Al Khaimah, closely allied to the Shihuh, resulted in a brief conflict and a subsequent negotiation confirmed the Habus would not pay the tax.

=== Claim over Kalba ===
Sultan was also reluctant to be pushed into schemes which furthered British interests in the area, particularly in the provision of infrastructure and increased British interference in issues which a number of the Trucial Sheikhs saw as their internal affairs. His relationship with the British wasn't improved in 1937, when his sister's husband, the Ruler of Kalba, died suddenly. Sultan bin Salim asserted his sovereignty over Kalba and moved quickly with a force of armed men against the emirate. The British had a vested interest in Kalba, which was the site of the backup landing strip to Sharjah airport and Sultan was punished by being sent to Bahrain. Following protracted negotiations, Kalba was held as a Regency by Khalid bin Ahmad Al Qasimi.

=== Oil concession and coup ===
Sultan's finances were worsened by the decline of pearling and the global impact of the Great Depression of 1929. Strangely, this impecunity helped him maintain his hold on power but when he secretly signed a lucrative oil concession with Petroleum Development Ltd, outraged family members conspired to have him removed and, in 1948, Saqr bin Mohammad Al Qasimi mounted a successful bloodless coup against his uncle.

Sultan bin Salim Al Qasimi died in 1951.
