= Khalid bin Saqr Al Qasimi =

UAE royal and politician (born 1940)

- Sheikh

Crown Prince and Deputy Ruler of Ras Al Khaimah
- Successor: Saud bin Saqr Al Qasimi
- Born: 1 January 1940 (age 86); Ras Al Khaimah, Trucial States
- Spouse: Sheikha Fawqi bint Saqr Al Qasimi
- House: Al Qasimi
- Father: Saqr bin Mohammed Al Qasimi
- Mother: Sheikha Nora bint Sultan Al Qasimi
- Religion: Islam

Sheikh Khalid bin Saqr Al Qasimi (born 1940) is the former Crown Prince and Deputy Ruler of the Emirate of Ras Al Khaimah, the northernmost Emirate of the United Arab Emirates. He is the eldest son of Sheikh Saqr bin Mohammed Al Qasimi, who ruled Ras Al Khaimah from 1948 until his death in 2010.

Khalid served as the Crown Prince and Deputy Ruler of Ras Al Khaimah from 1958 until his removal from office by his father in June 2003. He currently resides in Sharjah, a neighboring Emirate. Khalid has repeatedly stated that his father, Sheikh Saqr, in 2004 reaffirmed in a royal decree that Sheikh Khalid – not his half-brother, Sheikh Saud bin Saqr al Qasimi – was the true Crown Prince and Deputy Ruler of Ras Al Khaimah. The claim has not been officially recognized by the Government of Ras Al Khaimah or the United Arab Emirates.

== Personal life and education ==
Khalid is one of eight brothers, most of whom hold official roles within the government of Ras Al Khaimah. He undertook his elementary schooling in Ras Al Khaimah, his secondary education in Cairo and his higher education at Loughborough University, a public university located in the East Midlands of England in the United Kingdom.

== Service and record as Crown Prince ==
Sheikh Khalid was named Crown Prince and Deputy Ruler of Ras Al Khaimah in 1958. As Crown Prince, Sheikh Khalid oversaw the day-to-day operations of the Ras Al Khaimah Government and served as principal contact with all foreign governments. He led high-level diplomatic missions to the United States during the Nixon, Reagan and Clinton Administrations. In 1999, President Clinton personally received him in the White House.

He served as Chairman of the Board of the National Bank of Ras Al Khaimah, the Ras Al Khaimah National Oil Company, RAK Gas Commission and RAK Cement Company.

During his tenure as Crown Prince and Deputy Ruler, Sheikh Khalid promoted economic development including the expansion of both the International Airport and Saqr Port, the promotion of clean energy and agricultural initiatives, cement manufacturing and investment in health care.

Khalid has been called a reformer for his efforts to promote changes that would lead to greater popular participation in society in both the Emirates and the region as a whole. As the Arabic news network Al Jazeera noted, the "[r]eform minded Sheikh Khalid had asked for democratic changes in his Emirate and the Country as a whole which have later been fully accepted and integrated policies of the Federal Government of the United Arab Emirates."

Khalid also built a reputation for hardline opposition to Iran and its controversial occupation of the Tunb Islands, which had been under the long historical control of Ras Al Khaimah, but were forcibly seized by Iran on November 30, 1971.

== Controversy surrounding removal from office ==
After 37 years in office, Khalid was removed as Crown Prince and Deputy Ruler on June 14, 2003 by his father and replaced by his younger half-brother Sheikh Saud bin Saqr al Qasimi.

The removal of Sheikh Khalid as Crown Prince and Deputy Ruler caused unrest in Ras Al Khaimah (RAK) and was met with street protests. Thousands of demonstrators shouted "with our souls and blood we defend you Khalid" and "no other crown prince" following his expulsion. Order was restored when Abu Dhabi, the lead emirate of the UAE, sent armored vehicles to Ras Al Khaimah.

Media reports at the time speculated that Sheikh Khalid was removed, in part, due to his support for women's rights and his opposition to Iran and its controversial occupation of the Tunb Islands. In addition, Sheikh Khalid's opposition to the war in Iraq to depose Saddam Hussein's Ba'ath regime was seen as counter to UAE policy

Separate media reports attribute his removal from office to other factors, mainly that Sheikh Khalid was considered to be at odds with the political leadership of the UAE. Khalid's vocal hostility to the US intervention to depose Saddam Hussein's Ba'ath regime became a liability for the UAE. In 2003, he led a protest march of several hundred people through Ras-Al Khaimah that culminated with Khalid himself burning the American flag and allowed the local radio station to broadcast a consistently anti-US line. This occurred at a time when the federal government guided by Sheikh Zayed in Abu Dhabi was strengthening cooperation with the US.

Once Khalid was deposed, the Emirates News Agency (WAM) reported the appointment of Sheikh Saud bin Saqr al-Qasimi as crown prince without delay, which gave the impression that Abu Dhabi approved of the appointment. No reaction was forthcoming from Dubai. Those close to Shaikh Saqr al-Qasimi, the Ruler of Ras al-Khaimah, said that despite the fact that he was at the time approaching 85, he was still with full faculties. As such, the pressure that Sheikh Khalid's supporters put on him to reverse his decision was futile. He said to those attempting to mediate in the affair at the time: "These are my sons and I am free to make my own decisions."

Despite Sheikh Khalid's repeated claims on his personal website (www.sheikhkhalidrak.com) that he has in his possession a decree re-instating him as crown prince, such a document has never been officially recognized by the Government or Ras Al Khaimah or the United Arab Emirates. The decree was never officially published in the UAE nor does it have an official document number, both of which are necessary for such a decree to take effect. For this reason, the official UAE informational website, www.uaeinteract.com listed Sheikh Saud bin Saqr Al Qasimi as Crown Prince and Deputy Ruler of Ra's al-Khaimah.

Moreover, the UAE embassy in Washington, DC stated officially that "Khalid bin Saqr Al-Qasimi currently holds no official role in the local government of the emirate or the Federal Government of the United Arab Emirates. As such, his words, views, or expressions do not represent the official position of any governmental agency in the UAE, either local or federal."

== Attempting to regain power in Ras Al Khaimah ==
According to The Guardian, "Khalid and his aides are trying to destabilize the current regime by creating international pressure. The strategy is to raise the stakes among the international community by suggesting aggressively that the existing leaders of Ras Al Khaimah – Khalid's brother and father – are in league with Iran and may be breaking international sanctions to support its nuclear ambitions."

The Guardian has revealed that Sheikh Khalid has spent in excess of US$3.7m (£2.6m) for a team of the U.S. and European security strategists, lawyers and lobbyists in order to wage a campaign to, in their own words, "undermine the current regime's standing" and to force the leadership of the UAE in Abu Dhabi, which has powerful influence over the emirate, to "make a change". In other words, to precipitate a coup in Ras Al Khaimah.

To this end, Sheikh Khalid has become vocal about the increasing influence of Iran in Ras Al Khaimah. In a 2009 letter U.S. lawmakers he noted: "The supportive posture [RAK] takes toward the Islamic Republic of Iran is undermining the policies of the United States"...[RAK] has become "an increasingly important staging ground for Iranian efforts to circumvent international economic sanctions.

According to published reports, now shown to have been funded by Khalid's lobbying team, Ras Al Khaimah has become a preferred port for Iranian smugglers to avoid customs and move nuclear materials – potentially for weapons – into Iran. George Webb, the head of the Canada Border Services Agency's Counter Proliferation Section, told Canada's National Post:

While nominally in the U.A.E., the port is controlled by Iran and is situated just across the Gulf from Bandar Abbas, an Iranian city with a naval base and an airport capable of landing large transport planes. "Ras Al Khaimah is actually leased by the Iranian government, staffed by Iranian customs," Mr. Webb said, as he examined a classified satellite photo of the port.

Sheikh Khalid's U.S. communications team insists these claims are "well sourced", but they have been rejected by the UAE embassy in London and the US. The UAE also denied the Sheikh's claim that RAK has links to Iran's nuclear program and that a port in RAK has in effect become an Iranian base, allowing Tehran to avoid international sanctions. Instead the Embassy described the claims as attacks as "baseless and without foundation and should be seen in the context of his long-standing dispute with his family."

"These appear to be old, scurrilous rumors which Sheikh Khalid has made on numerous occasions," a spokesman for the UAE said in a statement. "His claims are baseless and without foundation and should be seen in the context of his long-standing dispute with his family. We are surprised that these old allegations are now being rehashed once again."

== Global lobbying activities ==
Published reports reveal that Khalid and his aides are attempting to destabilize the regime of his brother, Sheikh Saud, by creating international pressure through extensive lobbying in the US and Europe. The strategy is to raise the stakes among the international community by suggesting aggressively that the existing leaders of Ras Al Khaimah – Khalid's brother and father – are in league with Iran and may be breaking international sanctions to support its nuclear ambitions.

California Strategies, a US west coast PR firm, has been employed to use blogs, Twitter accounts and a multimillion-pound PR and advertising budget to this end. And the plotters' allegations do not stop there. A private defense company, The Erinnyes Group Inc., run by a former member of the US air force special forces, Glenn Ignazio, has been hired to draw up a report into Ras al-Khaimah's security profile.

Sheik Khalid has been criticized by the current regime in Ras Al Khaimah for political activities in the United States that raise awareness and document RAK's connection with Iran.

In addition, Sheikh Khalid hired Glenn Simpson, an ex-Wall Street Journal reporter with extensive experience in investigating how Islamic terrorism is financed.

Sheikh Khalid attended the inauguration of President Barack Obama and purchased billboards congratulating Mr. Obama on his victory.

== Current policy positions ==
Sheikh Khalid has called for a clean, sustainable and independent energy future for Ras Al Khaimah and for increased educational opportunities, including a rapid expansion of international and cross-cultural student exchanges.

The Partnership is focused on the following initiatives:

- Develop opportunities for sustainability between national and sub-national governments in the Middle East
- Bring together leading green technology innovators, environmental experts and renewable energy developers to guide leaders in the Middle East in developing a sustainable future
- Assist with identifying projects that will attract investment and provide economic growth
- Work with other international and regional groups to foster collaboration for sustainability
- Be a resource for learning more about how to invest, develop, and encourage sustainability in the Middle East

On sovereignty and security matters, Al Qasimi is a strong supporter of the efforts of the United Arab Emirates and of the need for Ras Al Khaimah to work within the framework of the Federal Government. In this context, Khalid has long stood against Iran's occupation of the Greater and Lesser Tonb Islands and Abu Musa and strongly supports the United Arab Emirates efforts to bring the matter before the International Court of Justice and the United Nations. These islands are of particularly strategic value because of their location at the mouth of the Strait of Hormuz, the only sea passage to the open ocean for most of the Arab states of the Persian Gulf, and through which 40 percent of the world's oil supply travels every year.

Al Qasimi has announced "A Pledge For Progress". It calls for:

- Building an economy to serve the people and not just the powerful
- Pursuing energy independence
- Preserving Sovereignty
- Increasing educational opportunities for the next generation
- Promoting the rule of law, including respect for intellectual property
- Encouraging greater popular participation in government
