= List of rulers of individual Emirates of the United Arab Emirates =

This article lists the rulers of separate states on the territory of the United Arab Emirates, which were historically known as the Trucial States, and most of which became its emirates.

== List of rulers ==
=== Emirate of Abu Dhabi ===
Al Nahyan of Al Abu Falah dynasty

Ruled	Name	Notes
1761–1793	Sheikh Dhiyab bin Isa Al Nahyan	d. 1793
1793–1816	Sheikh Shakhbut bin Dhiyab Al Nahyan	d. 1816
1816–1818	Sheikh Muhammad bin Shakhbut Al Nahyan	
1818	Sheikh Shakhbut bin Dhiyab Al Nahyan	Since 1818 joint with his son Tahnun
1818 – Apr 1833	Sheikh Tahnun bin Shakhbut Al Nahyan	Since 1818 joint with his father Shakhbut. d. 1833
Apr 1833 – 1845	Sheikh Khalifa bin Shakhbut Al Nahyan	Since 1833 joint with his brother Sultan. d. 1845
Apr 1833 – Jul 1845	Sheikh Sultan bin Shakhbut Al Nahyan	Since 1833 joint with his brother Khalifa. d. 1845
Jul 1845 – Sep 1845	Sheikh Isa bin Khalid al-Falahi	Usurper
Sep 1845 – Dec 1845	Sheikh Dhiyab II bin Isa al-Falahi	Usurper
Dec 1845 – 1855	Sheikh Saeed bin Tahnun Al Nahyan	
1855–1909	Sheikh Zayed I bin Khalifa Al Nahyan	b. 1840 – d. 1909
May 1909 – October 1912	Sheikh Tahnoun bin Zayed Al Nahyan	b. 1857 – d. 1912
October 1912 – 22 August 1922	Sheikh Hamdan bin Zayed Al Nahyan	b. 1881 – d. 1922
22 August 1922 – 4 August 1926	Sheikh Sultan II bin Zayed Al Nahyan	b. 1881 – d. 1926
4 August 1926 – 1 January 1928	Sheikh Saqr bin Zayed Al Nahyan	b. 1887 – d. 1928
1 January 1928 – 6 August 1966	Sheikh Shakhbut II bin Sultan Al Nahyan	b. 1905 – d. 1989
6 August 1966 – 2 November 2004	Sheikh Zayed II bin Sultan Al Nahyan	b. 1918 – d. 2004. Founded the UAE in 1971 and became its first president.
2 November 2004 – 13 May 2022	Sheikh Khalifa bin Zayed Al Nahyan	b. 1948 – d. 2022
13 May 2022 – present	Sheikh Mohamed bin Zayed Al Nahyan	b. 1961

=== Emirate of Dubai ===
Al Maktoum dynasty

Ruled	Name	Notes
9 July 1833 – 1836	Obeid bin Said bin Rashid	d. 1836
9 July 1833 – 1852	Maktoum bin Butti bin Suhail	d. 1852
1852–1859	Saeed bin Butti	d. 1859
1859 – 22 November 1886	Hasher bin Maktoum	d. 1886
22 November 1886 – 7 April 1894	Rashid bin Maktoum	d. 1894
7 April 1894 – 16 February 1906	Maktoum bin Hasher Al Maktoum	d. 1906
16 February 1906 – November 1912	Butti bin Suhail Al Maktoum	d. 1912
November 1912 – 9 September 1958	Saeed bin Maktoum Al Maktoum	b. 1878 – d. 1958
10 September 1958 – 7 October 1990	Rashid bin Saeed Al Maktoum	b. 1912 – d. 1990
7 October 1990 – 4 January 2006	Maktoum bin Rashid Al Maktoum	b. 1943 – d. 2006
4 January 2006 – present	Mohammed bin Rashid Al Maktoum	b. 1949

=== Emirate of Sharjah ===
Al Qasimi dynasty

Ruled	Name	Notes
1727–1777	Sheikh Rashid bin Matar Al Qasimi	
1777–1803	Sheikh Saqr bin Rashid Al Qasimi	
1803–1840	Sheikh Sultan bin Saqr Al Qasimi	First rule
1840	Sheikh Saqr bin Sultan Al-Qasimi	
1840–1866	Sheikh Sultan bin Saqr Al Qasimi	Second rule
1866 – 14 April 1868	Sheikh Khalid bin Sultan Al Qasimi	
14 April 1868 – March 1883	Sheikh Salim bin Sultan Al Qasimi	Since 1869 joint with his brother Ibrahim
1869–1871	Sheikh Ibrahim bin Sultan Al Qasimi	Since 1869 joint with his brother Salim
March 1883 – 1914	Sheikh Saqr bin Khalid Al Qasimi	
3 April 1914 – 21 November 1924	Sheikh Khalid bin Ahmad Al Qasimi	
21 November 1924 – 1951	Sheikh Sultan bin Saqr Al Qasimi II	
1951 – May 1951	Sheikh Muhammad bin Saqr Al Qasimi	
May 1951 – 24 June 1965	Sheikh Saqr bin Sultan Al Qasimi	Ousted bloodlessly by the British
24 June 1965 – 24 January 1972	Sheikh Khalid bin Mohammed Al Qasimi	Assassinated in course of Saqr III's counter-coup
25 January 1972 – 1972	Sheikh Saqr bin Muhammad Al Qasimi	Acting due to Khalid III's assassination by Saqr III
1972 – 17 June 1987	Sheikh Sultan bin Muhammad Al-Qasimi	First rule
17 – 24 June 1987	Sheikh Abdulaziz bin Muhammad Al Qasimi	Failed coup d'état attempt against his younger brother Sultan after 7 days. Became Crown Prince but later died in 2002.
25 June 1987 – present	Sheikh Sultan bin Muhammad Al-Qasimi	Second rule

=== Emirate of Fujairah ===
Al Sharqi dynasty

Ruled	Name	Notes
1879–1936	Sheikh Hamad bin Abdullah Al Sharqi	
1936–1938	Sheikh Saif bin Hamad Al Sharqi	
1938–1974	Sheikh Mohammed bin Hamad Al Sharqi	
1974–present	Sheikh Hamad bin Mohammad Al Sharqi	

=== Emirate of Ras Al Khaimah ===
Al Qasimi dynasty

Ruled	Name	Notes
17xx–17xx	Sheikh Rahma al-Qasimi	
17xx–174x	Sheikh Matar bin Rahma al-Qasimi	
174x–1777	Sheikh Rashid bin Matar al-Qasimi	
1777–1803	Sheikh Saqr bin Rashid Al Qasimi	
1803–1808	Sheikh Sultan bin Saqr al-Qasimi	First Rule
1808–1814	Sheikh al-Husayn bin Ali al-Qasimi	Acting Ruler
1814–1820	Sheikh Hassan bin Rahma Al Qasimi	Acting Ruler
1820–1866	Sheikh Sultan bin Saqr al-Qasimi	Second Rule
1866 – May 1867	Sheikh Ibrahim bin Sultan al-Qasimi	
May 1867 – 14 April 1868	Sheikh Khalid bin Sultan Al Qasimi	
14 April 1868 – 1869	Sheikh Salim bin Sultan al-Qasimi	
1869 – August 1900	Sheikh Humaid bin Abdullah Al Qasimi	
10 July 1921 – February 1948	Sheikh Sultan bin Salim Al Qasimi	
February 1948 – 27 October 2010	Sheikh Saqr bin Mohammad Al Qassimi	
27 October 2010 – present	Sheikh Saud bin Saqr Al Qasimi	

Throne vacant from August 1900 until 10 July 1921

=== Emirate of Umm Al Quwain ===
Al Mualla dynasty

Ruled	Name	Notes
1768–1820	Sheikh Rashid bin Majid Al Mualla	
1820–1853	Sheikh Abdullah bin Rashid Al Mualla	
1853–1873	Sheikh Ali bin Abdullah Al Mualla	
1873–1904	Sheikh Ahmad bin Abdullah Al Mualla	
1904–1922	Sheikh Rashid bin Ahmad Al Mualla	
1922–1923	Sheikh Abdullah bin Rashid Al Mualla II	
1923–1929	Sheikh Hamad bin Ibrahim Al Mualla	
1929–1981	Sheikh Ahmad bin Rashid Al Mualla	
1981–2009	Sheikh Rashid bin Ahmad Al Mualla II	
2009–present	Sheikh Saud bin Rashid Al Mualla	

=== Emirate of Ajman ===
Al Nuaimi dynasty

Ruled	Name	Notes
1816–1838	Sheikh Rashid bin Humaid Al Nuaimi	
1838–1841	Sheikh Humaid bin Rashid Al Nuaimi	1st time
1841–1848	Sheikh Abdelaziz bin Rashid Al Nuaimi	
1848–1864	Sheikh Humaid bin Rashid Al Nuaimi	2nd time
1864–1891	Sheikh Rashid bin Humaid Al Nuaimi II	
1891–1900	Sheikh Humaid bin Rashid Al Nuaimi II	
1900–1910	Sheikh Abdulaziz bin Humaid Al Nuaimi	
1910–1928	Sheikh Humaid Humaid bin Abdulaziz Al Nuaimi	
1928–1981	Sheikh Rashid bin Humaid Al Nuaimi III	
1981–present	Sheikh Humaid bin Rashid Al Nuaimi III	b. 1931

== List of rulers of pre-union regions ==
These are regions that were once independent but now are affiliated with other emirates.

=== Dibba ===
- Under a Hakim

Ruled	Name	Notes
1871–1883	Sheikh Ahmad bin Sultan al-Qasimi	
1883–1937	Sheikh Rashid bin Ahmad al-Qasimi	Since 1903 joint with his brother Khalid II
1903–1924	Sheikh Khalid bin Ahmad al-Qasimi	Since 1903 joint with his brother Rashid
1937–1951	Sheikh Ahmad bin Rashid al-Qasimi	

- Reincorporated into Sharjah 1951

=== Al Hamriyah ===
- Under a Hakim

Ruled	Name	Notes
1875–1904	Sheikh Sayf bin `Abd al-Rahman Al-Shamsi	
1904–1921	Sheikh `Abd al-Rahman bin Sayf Al-Shamsi	First Rule
1921–1922	Sheikh Humayd bin `Abd al-Rahman Al-Shamsi	First Rule
1922	Sheikh `Abd al-Rahman bin Sayf Al-Shamsi	Second Rule
1922	Sheikh Humayd bin `Abd al-Rahman Al-Shamsi	Second Rule

- Reincorporated into Sharjah 1922 but retained semi-autonomy until the late 1960s.

=== Al Heera ===
Ruled	Name	Notes
1915–1942	Abdulrahman bin Muhammad Al Shamsi	

- Reincorporated into Sharjah 1942

=== Kalba ===
- Under a Hakim

Ruled	Name	Notes
1871–1900	Sheik Majid bin Sultan al-Qasimi	
1900–1903	Sheik Hamad bin Majid al-Qasimi	
1903–1937	Sheikh Saeed bin Hamad al-Qasimi	
1937–1951	Sheikh Hamad bin Saeed al-Qasimi	
1951–1952	Sheikh Saqr bin Sultan al-Qasimi	

- Reincorporated into Sharjah 1952

== See also ==
- Royal families of the United Arab Emirates
- List of Sunni dynasties
