= Humaid bin Abdullah Al Qasimi =

- Sheikh

Ruler of Ras Al Khaimah
- Reign: 1869–1900
- Predecessor: Salim bin Sultan Al Qasimi
- Successor: Saqr bin Khalid Al Qasimi
- Died: 1900
- House: Al Qasimi

Sheikh Humaid bin Abdullah Al Qasimi was Ruler of Ras Al Khaimah from 1869 to 1900. He survived an attempt to unseat him by the Ruler of Sharjah, with whom he later allied. He re-united Ras Al Khaimah with its secessionist dependencies.

== Accession ==
On the accession of Salim bin Sultan Al Qasimi as Ruler of Sharjah in 1868, following the death of his brother Khalid bin Sultan, Salim's nephew, Humaid bin Abdullah, assumed the role of Wali of Ras Al Khaimah. In the following year he proclaimed independence from Sharjah.

The machinations of the Saudi Agent in Buraimi, Turki Bin Ahmed, resulted in an attempt to establish Humaid as Ruler of Sharjah, but this attempt ultimately failed, resulting in violence in Sharjah and the death of the gentleman concerned.

== Coup attempt ==
In May 1869, Salim bin Sultan and his brother Ibrahim moved together against Humaid bin Abdullah with the intention of establishing Ibrahim as Ruler of Ras Al Khaimah, landing 1,500 men from 32 boats. Humaid was supported by a force of some 500 men landed from Umm Al Quwain and fighting took place both at Jazirat Al Hamrah and in Ras Al Khaimah town. The British Resident, Colonel Lewis Pelly, on hearing of this breach of the Maritime Truce (the embarkation of troops in an act of war by sea breached the treaty) sailed from Lingeh in the Dalhousie with the gunboat Hugh Rose. Arriving at Ras Al Khaimah on 12 May, Pelly then ordered Salim and Ibrahim to withdraw their forces from Ras Al Khaimah by sunset the next day.

Alliances shifted quickly, however, and in 1871 Humaid bin Abdullah, together with the Ruler of Umm Al Qawain, supported Salim bin Sultan when he took advantage of Ibrahim's absence on a journey to Abu Dhabi and cemented his ascendancy by retaking total control of Sharjah. At the same time, Humaid bin Abdullah retook the dependencies of Sha'am, Rams and Shimal, which had managed to secede from his rule.

In 1882, a quarrel between Ahmad bin Abdullah Al Mualla of Umm Al Quwain and Humaid bin Abdullah broke out into open fighting. Umm Al Quwain’s ruler was censured by the British and forced to pay a fine after he broke the Maritime Truce with a raid against the northern port of Rams carried out by seven Umm Al Quwain boats. Fighting on land now took place, with Ajman backing Umm Al Quwain against Sharjah and members of the Na’im backing Ras Al Khaimah. Zayed bin Khalifa Al Nahyan of Abu Dhabi mediated and the affair was eventually closed.

An attempt by Sha'am to secede in 1885 resulted in Humaid extracting a fine of 1600 Marie Theresa Dollars.

He died in 1900, his death resulting in the Ruler of Sharjah, Saqr bin Khalid Al Qasimi, taking over Ras Al Khaimah that same year.
