= Khalid bin Ahmad Al Qasimi =

- Sheikh

Ruler of Sharjah
- Reign: 1914–1924
- Predecessor: Saqr bin Khalid Al Qasimi
- Successor: Sultan bin Saqr Al Qasimi II
- Died: 1950
- House: Al Qasimi

Sheikh Khalid bin Ahmad Al Qasimi was the Ruler of Sharjah, a Trucial State and now one of the United Arab Emirates, from 1914–1924 and Ras Al Khaimah from 1914–1921. He acceded in May 1914 on the death of Saqr bin Khalid Al Qasimi, although was suffering from a bout of plague on his accession.

His rule was tumultuous and unpopular, marked by internecine conflicts and public discontent and saw the final disintegration of the Al Qasimi's joint rule over Sharjah and Ras Al Khaimah.

Deposed as Ruler of Sharjah in 1924, he went on to become ruler of Dhaid and Kalba (itself recognised by the British as a Trucial State) and a highly influential figure in the Shamaliyah (the east coast of the peninsula).

== Accession ==
Saqr bin Khalid Al Qasimi nominated his cousin, Khalid bin Ahmad, as his successor shortly before his death, as his own sons were still minors. Khalid moved quickly against Saqr's young son, Sultan bin Saqr Al Qasimi, dispossessing him and forcing his eventual exile to Dubai in 1921.

One of Khalid bin Ahmad's first acts on becoming Ruler of Sharjah was to settle the question of Jazirat Al Hamra. Home to some 500 houses of the Za'ab tribe (the Emirati family name Al Zaabi derives from the singular of Za'ab), Jazirat Al Hamra was normally regarded as a dependency of Ras Al Khaimah (although it was frequently an unwilling one) and Khalid confirmed this in a 1914 formal division of dependencies between the two emirates.

In 1916, he moved to put down a revolt in Al Hamriyah, with the assistance of the British ship HMS Philomel, signing a peace with Al Hamriyah on 29 February 1916.

In 1919, Khalid bin Ahmad appointed his brother Rashid bin Ahmad as Wali of Dibba, which led to a prolonged dispute over the fiefdom after Khalid was deposed as Ruler of Sharjah in 1924.

== Loss of Ras Al Khaimah ==
Khalid bin Ahmad's rule was characterised by a number of challenges, not the least of which was losing Ras Al Khaimah as a dependency. He had inherited a problematic situation in Ras Al Khaimah, where Salim bin Sultan Al Qasimi, the former Ruler of Sharjah and, briefly, Ras Al Khaimah, had established virtual independence. Salim's son son Muhammad took over the leadership role in Ras Al Khaimah after Salim became paralysed and then, in July 1919 renounced his position in favour of his brother, Sultan. Salim died in August 1919, leaving Sultan as a leader in his place.

The British were initially reluctant to recognise Sultan bin Salim as a Trucial Sheikh (and therefore independent from Khalid bin Ahmad) as they believed his tenure would be short-lived. However, on 7 June 1921, he was confirmed as such by the British Political Resident. Khalid's impotence in the face of this act was striking, as was his weakness at managing the rebellious headman of Al Heera, Abdulrahman bin Muhammad Al Shamsi.

With the ongoing failure of pearling, in December 1919 Khalid bin Ahmad was forced to raise a public subscription to maintain himself and his rule – the people of Layyah, Sharjah and Al Heera provided him with funds, 31,000 rupees in all. Al Khan resisted and was eventually cajoled, with the help of the British Residency Agent in Sharjah, to part with 2,000 rupees. At the time, a bag of rice was selling for between forty and forty-five rupees and a bag of flour for thirty-five rupees. The ruler of Dubai was forced into a similar move, again because of the continuing failure of the town's pearling fleet.

Abdulrahman bin Muhammad Al Shamsi of Al Heera was in a similar position, with huge debts of over 21,000 rupees almost equivalent to the entire subscription raised by Dubai for the annual maintenance of its ruling family. Al Heera's pearling fleet was 25 boats strong, and Abdulrahman had no obvious way out of his debt.

On 15 June 1920, Abdulrahman seized the fort of Ajman and was only removed after the intercession of the British Residency Agent, who was concerned that Abdulrahman owed so much money, mainly to merchants who were British subjects. Khalid bin Ahmed raised a force, together with Humaid bin Abdulaziz Al Nuaimi of Ajman and together they attacked Abdulrahman in Heera. Again, the British intervened and an agreement was made that recognised Abdulrahman as a subject of Khalid's and bound him to cause no further trouble. This annoyed Humaid bin Abdulaziz of Ajman who gained nothing by it. Abdulrahman was offered asylum in the British Residency in Sharjah.

In early 1922, along with the other Trucial Sheikhs, Khalid signed an agreement with the British that any oil concessions would be granted only to a British government appointee. However, no such concession was signed during his rule. He also entered into an agreement with the headman of Hamriyah to grant the town independence, signed in the presence of the British Resident Agent (to the fury of the Political Resident in Bushire) on 9 August 1923. Khalid's successor considered the agreement void.

== Deposed as Ruler of Sharjah ==
Sultan bin Saqr Al Qasimi, Saqr bin Khalid's son, petitioned Khalid for the restitution of property and money that Khalid had seized on assuming power, but in vain. Embittered, he left Sharjah in 1921 and settled in Dubai.

In 1923, Sultan married the daughter of Abdulrahman bin Muhammad Al Shamsi. Khalid bin Ahmad took this as a challenge and once again moved against Abdulrahman at Heera, but Abdulrahman appealed to the Residency Agent who negotiated a peace and put two of his own men to guard the fort at Al Heera. Khalid then appointed a Wali over Al Heera, who Abdulrahman arrested. Khalid then moved against Al Heera, which Abdulrahman now prepared to defend against a combined force from Sharjah and Ajman. Another British intervention followed and Abdulrahman went to Dubai to join his son-in-law.

The people of Sharjah had enough. Khalid was unpopular and was seen as weak, having lost Ras Al Khaimah and oppressed Al Heera. He had raised the taxation on his already hard-pressed pearling fleet. His actions toward Sultan, the son of the former ruler, were widely deprecated and his taxes and levies were resented. On 1 November 1924, at the end of the pearling season, the people of Sharjah wrote to Sultan bin Saqr and invited him to return to Sharjah as ruler. Backed by Bedouin recruited by Abdulrahman, Sultan deposed Khalid in a brief, 11-day conflict. Khalid took refuge in Dubai and then Umm Al Quwain.

== Ruler of Dhaid ==
Although removed as Ruler of Sharjah, Khalid had considerable influence over Sharjah's eastern dependencies, Dhaid, Dibba and Kalba. On taking control of Sharjah, Sultan bin Saqr removed Khalid's brother Rashid bin Ahmed as Wali of Dibba. The move was unpopular amongst the people of Dibba, itself a divided town, with the Shihuh dominating the Omani northern part of the town, the Al Qasimi the middle part and the south belonging to Fujairah. However, Rashid was restored in 1926 after leading a popular revolt and remained as wali until his death in 1937.

Now Khalid bin Ahmad moved against Sharjah, Sultan bin Saqr having sold off some of Khalid's property. On 10 June 1927, at the end of Ramadan, Ahmed led a force of men against Sharjah, supported by fighters from Umm Al Quwain, Hamriyah and the Bani Qitab Bedouin. Following 11 days of fighting, the British ships HMS Triad and HMS Lupin arrived at Sharjah and forced a ceasefire. In June 1927 Sultan bin Saqr and Khalid bin Ahmad agreed compensation for Khalid's property and a subsidy to be paid to Khalid by Sultan of 2,500 rupees a year. Khalid would take the fort at the desert oasis town of Dhaid and benefit from the revenues of the town. Dhaid, in 1906, generated some 228 Marie Theresa Dollars annually in water rates, as well as revenue from the sale of dates.

Although he had Sultan bin Saqr's agreement, Khalid remained in Umm Al Qawain and sent some of his men to Dhaid to occupy his newly acquired property as the Bedouin who had manned the fort for Sultan were still active in the area. With the support of the Sheikhs of the Bedouin Bani Ka'ab and Na'im tribes, who favoured any scheme which would weaken Sharjah, it was agreed that the ruler of Ras Al Khaimah, Sultan bin Salim Al Qasimi, would possess Dhaid 'on behalf of Khaled bin Ahmad'. This arrangement was not fully supported by Sultan bin Salim himself, who feared antagonising Sultan bin Saqr and also believed Khalid bin Ahmad would represent an ongoing financial burden with little hope of any return other than conflict.

Khalid bin Ahmad finally took full possession of Dhaid in his own right in July 1928.

== Ruler of Kalba ==
In April 1937, Khalid bin Ahmad married Aisha, the daughter of the former Wali but now ruler of Kalba, Sheikh Said bin Hamad Al Qasimi. Said bin Hamad had been recognised as a Trucial Sheikh by the British in 1936 in return for his agreement to confer landing rights for a backup airstrip to support the Imperial Airways airfield in Sharjah. Said bin Hamad died suddenly at the end of April 1937 while visiting Khor Fakkan. Said bin Hamad's son, Hamad, was still a minor and therefore Aisha moved quickly to establish a regency, travelling to Kalba and organising the town's defences. For many years Said bin Hamad had lived in Ajman and entrusted a slave by the name of Barut to manage Kalba on his behalf and Aisha now arranged for Barut to once again take charge as Wali. She sent a message to Khalid bin Ahmad, who was in Ras Al Khaimah at the time.

A period of intense political infighting and negotiation between the many involved parties now followed. In June 1937, the notable residents of Kalba selected the slave Barut as Regent for the 12-year-old Hamad, but this solution was not accepted by the British and Khalid bin Ahmad was selected as regent. Khalid was increasingly seen as an influential and unifying figure by the Bedouin and the townspeople of the East Coast, to the point where his old foe, Sultan bin Saqr of Sharjah, was forced to ask Khalid bin Ahmad for help in pacifying the tribes of the interior, particularly the Bani Qitab, paying Khalid 1,500 Rupees for his intercession.

Khalid ruled over Dhaid and Kalba (delegating his rule in Kalba to Barut and choosing himself to live in Dhaid and Al Heera) until 1950, when he was too old and infirm to take a further role in affairs. He died that year.
