= Abdelaziz bin Rashid Al Nuaimi =

- Sheikh

Ruler of Ajman
- Reign: 1841–1848
- Predecessor: Humaid bin Rashid Al Nuaimi
- Successor: Humaid bin Rashid Al Nuaimi
- Died: 1848
- House: Al Nuaimi

Abdelaziz bin Rashid Al Nuaimi was the Ruler of Ajman, one of the Trucial States which now form the United Arab Emirates (UAE), from 1841 to 1848.

Abdelaziz deposed his brother, Sheikh Humaid bin Rashid Al Nuaimi, in May 1841, taking possession of Ajman fort. With popular support, Abdelaziz consolidated his position and was able to avoid any intervention from Humaid's father-in-law and close ally, Sheikh Sultan bin Saqr Al Qasimi, the Ruler of Sharjah.

In May 1847, Abdelaziz was a signatory to the treaty with the British, the 'Engagement to Prohibit Exportation of Slaves'.

He received commendations from the British following an incident in 1845, when two vessels carrying rice tried to make Ajman port in a storm: one was wrecked at the entrance to the harbour, but the other managed to make the inner harbour, having lost part of its cargo. A number of men attempted to help themselves to the cargo of the partly wrecked boat, and Abdelaziz personally forced the crowd back at swordpoint, protecting both the cargo and crew.

He led 400 men of Ajman into battle with neighbouring Hamriyah in September 1848, incurring huge loss of life. Abdelaziz himself was killed in the action and his brother Humaid bin Rashid was wounded. Humaid, whom Rashid had originally deposed in 1841, now acceded once again as ruler of Ajman.
