= Layyah, Sharjah =

Layyah
- Location within United Arab Emirates
- Coordinates: 25°21′3″N 55°22′17″E
- Country: United Arab Emirates
- Emirate: Sharjah

Layyah is the name of a suburb of the city of Sharjah, United Arab Emirates (UAE). It is the site of the city's main power station and desalination plant.

At the turn of the 20th century, it was noted by J.G. Lorimer that there were roughly four or five shops in Layyah, in addition to a bazaar of some 200 shops in Sharjah proper.
