= Saqr bin Rashid Al Qasimi =

- Sheikh

Ruler of Ras Al Khaimah
- Reign: 1777–1803
- Predecessor: Rashid bin Matar Al Qasimi
- Successor: Sultan bin Saqr Al Qasimi
- Died: 1803
- House: Al Qasimi

Saqr bin Rashid Al Qasimi was the Ruler of Ras Al Khaimah and Sharjah from 1777–1803 as head of the Al Qasimi maritime federation. He acceded following the resignation of his father, Sheikh Rashid bin Matar Al Qasimi, the head of the Al Qasimi, after some 30 years' rule.

Saqr married the daughter of Sheikh Abdullah Al Ma'in of Qishm, a key rival of his father's and the former Sheikh of Qishm, cementing an alliance between the Ma'in and the Al Qasimi which consolidated Al Qasimi power in Qishm and Lingeh and gave them effective control of access to the Persian Gulf.

Saqr's strong leadership helped the Qawasim (the plural of Al Qasimi) expand their trading links, gaining a foothold in the coastal towns Charak and Lingeh on the Iranian side of the Persian Gulf, the islands of Siri, Qishm and Qais and Ras Al Khaimah (which was already in their hands) and Rams on the Arabian coast, an area known as Sir at the time, as well as Shinas on the coast of the Gulf of Oman.

== Accusations of piracy ==
Shortly after the handover of power from Rashid to Saqr, in 1778, the first accusation of piracy against the Qawasim was made by the British after a vessel flying Omani colours that turned out to be owned by the East India Company was taken off the coast of Ras Al Khaimah. Pressed by the British to explain their actions, the Al Qasimi response, from Rashid himself, was that the vessel was flying the colours of the Sultan of Muscat, with whom the Qawasim were at war. An investigation led to a note written by Francis Warden, Chief Secretary to the Government of Bombay, which stated that not until 1796 could he trace a single act of aggression by the Al Qasimi against the British flag. Nevertheless, the die was cast – the Qawasim would come into increasing conflict with the ally of their enemy in Muscat – the British.

=== The Bassein incident ===
The Bassein was a snow, a small ship similar to a brig, used for both trade and as a light military escort. Sailing past Rams north of Ras Al Khaimah on 18 May 1797, she was taken by a force of twenty-two dhows and escorted to Ras Al Khaimah. At this time, the Qawasim were at war with Oman and Oman was at war with Persia. The Bassein and its crew were released two days later on the order of Saqr bin Rashid Al Qasimi, who responded to a query regarding the incident from the British Resident at Basra, ‘God forbid I should think of capturing your vessels,’ he said. ‘I must however observe on the subject of the detention of your vessel by my cruisers near the Island of Qeshm… When my cruiser meets the vessel of my friends such as those belonging to you, to the Arabs in alliance with me and to the Basra Government, they behave to them with amity, but when they meet the vessels of my enemies they attack and destroy them, placing confidence in God.’

Lorimer cites the incident as an 'insult to the British flag', but there was no evidence presented of any injury, plunder or other harm. The Bassein was allowed to continue on its way with all hands. The incident has been termed 'an odd sort of piracy.'

=== The Viper incident ===
On 15 September 1797, fourteen-gun British brig Viper was at Bushire as were a number of Qawasim dhows under the command of Saleh, the estranged nephew of Saqr bin Rashid. Saleh approached the resident of Bushire and outlined his intention to run down some dhows from the Omani port of Sur who were at the port. He requested that the British stay aloof from his planned action and requested supplies of powder and shot and was in fact given forty three-pound cannon balls but no powder.

The resulting action in the port was a scene of great confusion. The Viper was shot at and immediately cast off and prepared for war, directing a broadside of shot herself at the dhows surrounding her at port. Saqr bin Rashid, in the correspondence with the Resident at Basra that followed, said that the Omani dhows were first to open fire. The Viper’s captain says ‘two of the dhows’ fired on the ship. Saqr bin Rashid made many protestations of friendship towards the British and assured the Resident that he would investigate the incident further with Saleh.

The Viper lost thirty-two of its crew of sixty-five, including the young Lieutenant Carruthers, who had taken charge of the vessel as fighting broke out. The Viper's captain was ashore at the time of the incident.

=== Civil war in Oman ===
Francis Warden concluded that a number of the incidents taking place in the Gulf at this time could be laid at the door of the state of unrest that prevailed in Oman, where the Imam Ahmad bin Said Al Busaidi’s death in December 1783 had resulted in the usurpation of his successor, Sultan bin Ahmad. As a result, Omani ships from both sides of what was effectively an Omani civil war were cruising the Gulf and those allied to the deposed Imam felt free to attack the ships of their enemy’s ally: the British, who had signed a treaty with the Sultan in August 1798. In fact, it was to be Warden, in his 1819 Historical Sketch of the Joasmee Arabs, who stated that up until the close of 1804, the Qawasim ‘committed no act of piracy but, with the exception of the attacks on the Bassein and Viper cruisers, manifested every respect to the British flag.’

At the turn of the century, the Wahhabi forces of the First Saudi Kingdom started to encroach on the area and their threat against the Buraimi oasis caused the Sultan of Muscat to seek peace with Saqr.

On his death in 1803, Saqr was succeeded by his son, Sultan bin Saqr Al Qasimi.
