= Sultan bin Saqr Al Qasimi II =

Ruler of Sharjah from 1924 to 1951

- Sheikh
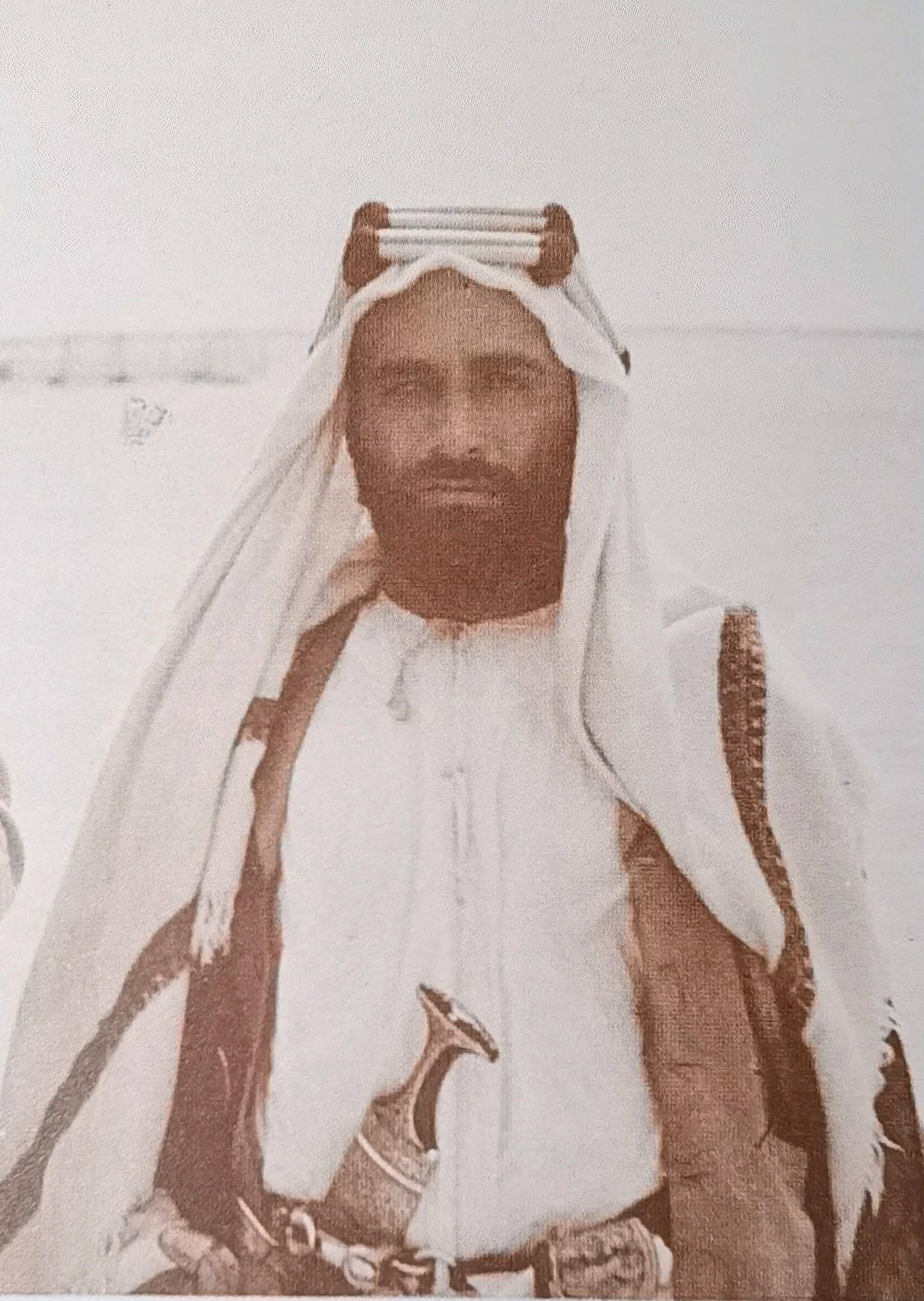
- Sheikh Sultan II in 1935

Ruler of Sharjah
- Reign: 21 November 1924 – March 1951
- Predecessor: Khalid bin Ahmad Al Qasimi
- Successor: Muhammad bin Saqr Al Qasimi (acting, March–May 1951); Saqr bin Sultan Al Qasimi
- Born: Sultan bin Saqr bin Khalid bin Sultan bin Saqr Al Qasimi; 23 June 1906; Sharjah
- Died: March 1951 (aged 44); London, United Kingdom
- Burial: Sharjah
- Spouse: Noura bint Abdulrahman Al Shamsi; Meera bint Muhammad Al Suwaidi; Latifa bint Saeed Al Qutbi
- Issue: Saqr (Ruler of Sharjah, 1951–1965); Shaikha; Khalid; Muhammad; Salim; Noura; Abdullah; Saud; Ahmed (Deputy Ruler, 1990–2020); Azza; Alya
- House: Al Qasimi
- Father: Saqr bin Khalid Al Qasimi
- Mother: Shaikha bint Khamis bin Salim Al Suwaidi

Sheikh Sultan II bin Saqr Al Qasimi (23 June 1906 – March 1951) was the Ruler of Sharjah, a Trucial State and now one of the United Arab Emirates, from 1924 to 1951. He was responsible for the establishment of the first airport in the Trucial States and Persian Gulf, Sharjah Airport, and the construction of Mahatta Fort to serve passengers on the Imperial Airways Empire Route.

His father having ceded the rule of Sharjah to Khalid bin Ahmad Al Qasimi, Sultan found himself dispossessed and in 1921 departed to live in exile in Dubai. In 1923, he married the daughter of Abdulrahman bin Shamsi, the headman of Al Heera.

Buoyed by Khalid's unpopularity and backed by Abdulrahman's force of personality and arms, Sultan deposed Khalid and became Ruler of Sharjah. However, he found the interior of the country dominated by Bedouin tribes and the East coast increasingly dominated by the former Ruler, Khalid bin Ahmad, leaving Sultan the effective ruler of a cluster of coastal settlements, many of which constantly tried to secede from his rule.

He is cited as having presided over a low ebb in the power of the Qawasim, formerly a powerful maritime federation.

Born on 23 June 1906, Sultan bin Saqr succeeded his cousin Khalid bin Ahmad Al Qasimi as Ruler of Sharjah on 21 November 1924. During his rule Sharjah became the site of the first airport in the territory of the present-day United Arab Emirates, under an agreement signed with the British government on 22 July 1932 for Imperial Airways, and on 17 September 1937 he granted the emirate's first oil concession. He founded a library in Sharjah Fort in 1925 and later funded the Al Islah school, which was renamed after him. A poet, he died in London in March 1951 after a long illness; his brother Muhammad bin Saqr administered the emirate as acting ruler for about two months before his son Saqr bin Sultan Al Qasimi was recognised as Ruler in May 1951. His poems were collected and edited by his nephew, the present Ruler of Sharjah Sheikh Sultan bin Muhammad Al-Qasimi, in three volumes published between 2011 and 2018.

== Accession ==
Sultan's father, Saqr bin Khalid Al Qasimi, died while Sultan was still a young boy. Shortly before his death, he agreed that Khalid bin Ahmad Al Qasimi (his senior cousin) should become Ruler. Khalid acceded in 1914.

Sultan bin Saqr, on reaching his majority, petitioned Khalid for the restitution of the property and money that Khalid had seized on assuming power, but in vain. Embittered, Sultan left Sharjah in 1921 and settled in exile in Dubai. In 1923, he married the daughter of Abdulrahman bin Muhammad Al Shamsi the headman of Al Heera, a dependency of Sharjah, who had been embroiled in open conflict with both the Rulers of Sharjah and Ajman.

Khalid bin Ahmad Al Qasimi took this union as a challenge and attacked Abdulrahman Al Shamsi at his home in Al Heera. Following an intercession by the British Resident Agent, Abdulrahman quit Al Heera and went to live in Dubai with his son-in-law Sultan.

Khalid was unpopular and was seen as weak, having lost Ras Al Khaimah and oppressed Heera. His actions towards Sultan, as the son of the former ruler, were widely deprecated by the people of Sharjah and his taxes and levies were resented. On 1 November 1924, Sultan bin Saqr was welcomed into Sharjah and, acting with the support of Abdulrahman and his forces, deposed Khalid after 11 days of street to street fighting.

== Rule ==
Although removed as Ruler of Sharjah, Khalid had considerable influence over Sharjah's eastern dependencies, Dhaid, Dibba and Kalba. On taking control of Sharjah, Sultan bin Saqr removed Khalid's brother Rashid bin Ahmad as Wali of Dibba. However, he was restored in 1926 after leading a popular revolt and remained as Wali until his death in 1937.

In June 1927, following a brief and bloody fight in Sharjah between forces loyal to Khalid bin Ahmad and forces loyal to Sultan bin Saqr, an agreement was reached between Sultan and Khalid to provide for the upkeep of the deposed ruler's family. This ceded the fort at Dhaid and the revenues of the inland oasis town to Khalid bin Ahmad. Dhaid, in 1906, generated some 228 Marie Theresa Dollars annually in water rates, as well as revenue from the sale of dates.

Although he had Sultan bin Saqr's agreement, Khalid remained in Umm Al Qawain and sent some of his men to Dhaid to occupy his newly acquired property as the Bedouin who had manned the fort for Sultan were still active in the area. With the support of the Sheikhs of the Bedouin Bani Ka'ab and Na'im tribes, who favoured any scheme which would weaken Sharjah, it was agreed that the ruler of Ras Al Khaimah, Sultan bin Salim Al Qasimi, would possess Dhaid 'on behalf of Khaled bin Ahmad'. This arrangement was not fully supported by Sultan bin Salim himself, who feared antagonising Sultan bin Saqr and also believed Khalid bin Ahmad would represent an ongoing financial burden with little hope of any return other than conflict.

Khalid bin Ahmad finally took full possession of Dhaid in his own right in July 1928.

== Abdulrahman Al Shamsi ==
Sultan's father-in-law was, to say the least, a colourful figure and in October 1925 was accused of the murder of the cousin of the British Native Residency Agent, Isa Bin Abdullatif Al Serkal. Although it wasn't doubted that Abdulrahman disliked the man, there was scant proof of his involvement in the murder and the British sent the Political Resident (accompanied by the Bahraini trader, Yousuf Kanoo) to Sharjah to investigate. They concluded (with no trial and scant evidence) that Abdulrahman was responsible. This caused an increasing outcry and outbreak of tension between the Al Bu Shamis and other leaders on the coast. In order to reduce tension and with fear of another attack on the Residency Agent part it was arranged that Abdulrahman would be sent to Ras Al Khaimah and given into the custody of the Ruler, Sultan bin Salim Al Qasimi. It was then decided by the British Political Resident to exile Abdulrahman to Aden for four years. HMS Triad and the sloop HMS Cyclamen were dispatched to Ras Al Khaimah, where the Ruler, Sultan bin Salim refused to give up Abdulrahman ‘for fear of consequences to himself’. With the help of Saeed Al Maktoum of Dubai five days later on 16 June 1926, Abdulrahman gave himself up to the British and was sent to Aden. Having served three years of his four-year exile, in 1929 he was permitted to return after a sustained outcry led by Sultan bin Saqr and the leaders of the Al Bu Shamis.

Abdulrahman was to be a staunch and helpful ally to Sultan, who faced the task of containing many of the uncompromising and warlike chiefs of Bedouin tribes such as the Bani Qitab, who declared war on Sultan but who were allied to Abdulrahman. When war broke out between Sharjah and Ajman in 1933, Abdulrahman brought the Bani Qitab and Manasir to fight on Sharjah's side. This didn't stop the Bani Qitab, who were paramount across much of the interior of the peninsula, in 1936 blocking geologists from Petroleum Concessions from exploring the interior, even though they held permits from Sultan. Eventually Sultan was to petition his predecessor, Khalid bin Ahmad Al Qasimi, to intercede on his behalf with the Bani Qitab – Khalid having become a highly influential leader amongst the tribes of the East Coast. However, this was not successful, Sultan remaining in effective control by 1937 of only the Western coastal area of Sharjah.

Abdulrahman's powerful personality and position appear to have given him a dominant role in his relationship with Sultan, who came to resent his father-in-law - especially when he declared Al Heera independent of Sharjah. He attempted to have Abdulrahman ostracised by other leaders but to no avail and it was only on Abdulrahman's death that Al Heera was confirmed as a part of the territory of Sharjah.

== East Coast ==
Sultan bin Saqr's 18th century namesake had established Al Qasimi dominance over the east coast, the area known as the Shamaliyah but the Al Qasimi relationship with the dominant tribe of Fujairah, the Sharqiyin, was fractious and the Sharqiyin on a number of occasions moved to secede from Sharjah, but also to encroach on the territory of Kalba.

In 1926, strained relations boiled over into open conflict between Kalba and Fujairah. A number of tribal affiliations were brought into the fray and Sharjah, Muscat and Ras Al Khaimah were all involved in what looked to be escalating into a major tribal conflict.

The involvement of the Sultan of Muscat led to an agreement agreed by all parties and peace broke out, only to be threatened again in 1927.

By 1936, the grant of Trucial Status to Kalba by the British and the establishment of rule over Kalba by Khalid bin Ahmad Al Qasimi stabilised the situation.

== Sharjah Airport ==
An air route to connect the British empire was established by Imperial Airways, running from Croydon via Cairo to Cape Town in South Africa and Brisbane in Australia. The agreement to use a base on the Persian coast lapsed in 1932 and a Southern route was subsequently sought as a matter of urgency. Surveys were made in Dibba and Sharjah, with two Sharjah locations being preferred. Carried out by Group Captain Welsh, the survey noted that the rest house required for the overnight stay should be fortified. Welsh also pointed to the likely location of Kalba on the east coast, which would eventually host the backup airstrip, leading to Kalba being recognised by the British as a Trucial State in its own right.

British Political Resident, Sir Hugh Biscoe had obtained Sultan bin Saqr's agreement to the airfield both verbally and in a letter and was surprised to arrive in Sharjah on 2 May 1932 and find Sultan opposed to signing an agreement to host the facility. Biscoe blamed Dubai for 'getting at' Sultan, despite Saeed Al Maktoum's strong opposition to aviation. In a state of penury following the long and slow collapse of the pearling industry, Sultan had even been forced to pawn family jewels, and could hardly afford to alienate family members opposed to what they saw was the inevitable expansion of British interests and direct presence in Sharjah.

Biscoe called for the Air Force to send a flight of Westland Wapitis to Sharjah to ‘strengthen the Sheikh’s hand’, clearly intending the warplanes to have a threatening impact on the group opposed to the airport. Sultan bin Saqr also called on his father-in-law for support and Abdulrahman duly weighed in. The Wapitis arrived on 20 May and their pilots laid out markers for the proposed runway, but Sultan bin Saqr’s brothers erased the marked-out ground soon after the planes left. HMS Bideford was called in, visiting Ajman and Ras Al Khaimah and issuing warnings to their respective rulers not to interfere. Sultan held out for more concessions, including that the British India steamer call to Sharjah, as it did to Dubai, fortnightly. On 19 July 1932, on his way to Sharjah to finalise the negotiations, Hugh Vincent Biscoe died of a heart attack.

Biscoe had taken the precaution of calling to Kuwait to pick up Arabist (Biscoe himself spoke no Arabic) Lieutenant-Colonel Harold Dickson, suspecting that the Residency Agent was not providing an accurate translation. Dickson agreed with Biscoe, afterwards he was to note, ‘I am inclined to think that he has not given us all the support that we had a right to expect in this affair of the air station.' However, with Biscoe now dead, Dickson took over negotiations. The argument was passionate and long. Dickson was to recall, 'I told the Sheikh quite openly that it was impossible for me to continue business in an atmosphere which resembled that of chattering women rather than the deliberations of serious men.’

=== Agreement ===
Punctuated by the arrival of a flying boat, yet another British show of strength, the two-day-long wrangle was finally concluded when, at 7.30 pm on 22 July 1932, Sultan bin Saqr Al Qasimi signed an agreement for ‘the establishment of an air station at Sharjah’. The agreement secured Sultan bin Saqr a monthly rental of 800 Rupees for landing rights and fees and a personal subsidy of 500 Rupees. Concerned that the airfield would result in British interference in Sharjah's internal affairs, he also gained assurances that British shipping would route through Sharjah, providing income for the town's traders.

He agreed to build a rest-house for crew and passengers which was fortified against "possible but unlikely raids by bedouin" according to the 1937 documentary film Air Outpost, which featured Sharjah's airport. Sultan also supplied a number of armed men as guards.

At 4 p.m. on 5 October 1932, the first westbound Imperial Airways flight arrived from Gwadar to Sharjah, carrying four passengers on the Handley Page HP42 aircraft ‘Hanno’.

The route was originally flown by HP42s, with two weekly flights landing in Sharjah on Sunday and Wednesday evenings on the outbound flight and Wednesday and Saturday evenings on the return flight. A backup landing strip was established in Kalba in August 1936.

By 1938, Sharjah was no longer an overnight stop on the route although the Imperial Airways flying boat service from Sydney to London included an overnight stop in Dubai, following the establishment of Civil Air Agreements with Dubai's ruler. The outbreak of skirmishing between Dubai and usurpers who had escaped to Al Khan in Sharjah in 1940 threatened the security of Sharjah's airport and led to unusual intervention by the British political agent in a land-based dispute: the British had previously restricted their interests and treaties purely to maritime affairs. That same year, the British agent reported that were attempts to disseminate pro-Nazi German sentiments in Sharjah by members of the Sheikh's court, which, however, were promptly stopped after British verbal intervention.

The airport was used extensively during World War II by the RAF and a new agreement was made with Sultan to establish an RAF base in Sharjah.

== Oil concession (1937) ==
On 17 September 1937 Sultan bin Saqr signed an agreement with Petroleum Concessions Ltd granting the company a concession to explore for oil in Sharjah, the first agreement of its kind in the emirate. The concession allowed nine years of geological survey before drilling; on 26 February 1946 the Sheikh signed an amendment extending that period because of the war.

== Secession ==
Sultan's rule was plagued by attempts at secession, not only by Al Heera, but also Kalba, Dibba, Fujairah, Dhaid, Al Khan and Hamriyah. Having lost the effective control of the East coast and the interior to Khalid bin Ahmad Al Qasimi, Sultan relied on British interventions in order to retain control even of his diminished coastal holding. In trying to allow access to the interior for geologists exploring for oil under the terms of concessions he had signed, he was forced to ask Khalid bin Ahmad for help in pacifying the tribes of the East Coast and interior, particularly the Bani Qitab, paying Khalid 1500 Rupees for his intercession.

== Education and libraries ==
In 1925 Sultan bin Saqr established a library in Sharjah Fort, known as the Al Qasimia Library, which Sharjah's public library system regards as its origin; its centenary was marked in 2025. He encouraged and supported the Al Taimia Library, opened by Abdullah bin Hassan Al Madfa on 10 February 1929. In the late 1940s he took over the full funding of the Al Islah school, which was renamed "Al Islah Al Qasimia" in his honour. His secretary and treasurer was Ibrahim bin Muhammad Al Madfa, founder of the handwritten newspaper Oman in 1927. According to his nephew's memoir Sard al-Dhat (2009), he kept two libraries, one in the fort and one at his house.

== Poetry ==
Sultan bin Saqr began composing poetry at the age of twenty-one and wrote much of his verse in India during periods of medical treatment, on illness, absence from home and longing for his family. His nephew, Sheikh Sultan bin Muhammad Al-Qasimi, collected and edited his poems in three volumes published by Al Qasimi Publications: Nashij al-Wada: The Last Poems of Sheikh Sultan bin Saqr bin Khalid Al Qasimi (2011), Poetic Exchanges between Sheikh Sultan bin Saqr Al Qasimi and his friend Sheikh Muhammad bin Abdulaziz Al Siddiqi (2017), and Al-Tayyib fi al-Tashbib: Poems of Sheikh Sultan bin Saqr Al Qasimi (2018). The Ruler also devoted the second chapter of his autobiography Sard al-Dhat (2009) to his uncle, and documented the 1932 air agreement in Sharjah Air Station between East and West (2008).

== Illness, death and succession ==
Sultan bin Saqr travelled to India for medical treatment in 1944, leaving Sharjah on 19 April and returning on 12 September. In March 1949 he fell seriously ill and was flown to the Bahrain Government Hospital and then, on 10 March 1949, to Bombay for further treatment, his brother Muhammad bin Saqr acting for him in Sharjah. Sharjah Fort Museum displays his passport and a letter of thanks that he wrote to his doctors in India. On 8 February 1951 he travelled to Europe to continue his treatment, and he wrote his last poem on 8 March 1951. He died in London in March 1951, and his body was brought back to Sharjah. His brother Muhammad bin Saqr administered the emirate as acting ruler for about two months, until his son Saqr bin Sultan was recognised as Ruler in May 1951, with a formal ceremony on 1 May 1951.

His son, Saqr bin Sultan Al Qasimi, acceded to rule Sharjah but, a fervent Arab Nationalist, he was removed at the request of the Al Qasimi family in 1965. He would later return to Sharjah and mount an attempted coup in February 1972 that resulted in the death of the ruler of Sharjah and UAE founding father, Khalid bin Muhammad Al Qasimi. Saqr's surrender was taken by Sheikh Mohammed bin Rashid Al Maktoum at the head of the Union Defence Force.

== Personal life ==
According to the Ruler of Sharjah's genealogical work Al-Tadhkira bil-Arham, Sultan bin Saqr's mother was Sheikha bint Khamis bin Salim Al Suwaidi, and he married three times. By Noura bint Abdulrahman bin Muhammad Al Shamsi, whom he married in 1923, he had Shaikha and Saqr, Ruler of Sharjah from 1951 to 1965; by Meera bint Muhammad bin Salim Al Suwaidi he had Khalid, Muhammad, Salim and Noura; and by Latifa bint Saeed bin Salim bin Bainouna Al Qutbi he had Abdullah, Saud, Ahmed (Deputy Ruler of Sharjah, 1990–2020), Azza and Alya. His grandsons include the Crown Prince of Sharjah, Sheikh Sultan bin Mohammed bin Sultan Al Qasimi, son of Muhammad, and the Deputy Ruler, Sheikh Sultan bin Ahmed Al Qasimi, son of Ahmed. His brother Muhammad bin Saqr was the father of the present Ruler, Sheikh Sultan bin Muhammad Al-Qasimi; his sister Aisha bint Saqr married Sheikh Sultan bin Salim Al Qasimi, Ruler of Ras Al Khaimah (1921–1948). His house stood next to Sharjah Fort.
