= Rashid bin Matar Al Qasimi =

- Sheikh

Ruler of Ras Al Khaimah
- Reign: 1747–1777
- Predecessor: Rahma bin Matar Al Qasimi
- Successor: Saqr bin Rashid Al Qasimi
- Died: after 1777
- House: Al Qasimi

Sheikh Rashid bin Matar Al Qasimi was Ruler of Ras Al Khaimah and Sharjah from 1747 to 1777, as head of the Al Qasimi maritime federation. Rashid bin Matar ruled at a time when maritime violence was prevalent throughout the Persian Gulf, following incursions by the Portuguese and fighting at sea and on land on the Persian Coast between the Persians, British and Dutch and the British and French, over 'factories' established on that coast by both maritime powers.

== Clashes with the British ==
In 1727, the Al Qasimi established a port at Qishm, causing a loss of trade to the British, which led to the bombardment of the Al Qasimi facility and a demand for restitution from the British for the losses they had suffered.

British East India Company interests were habitually protected by the use of firepower and two Arab maritime forces jostling for supremacy on both coasts of the Persian Gulf, the Al Qasimi and the Bani Ma'ain, soon found themselves in conflict with the British (J. G. Lorimer reports 'the insolence of the local chiefs'). The Al Qasimi fleet of the time comprised some 63 large and 669 small ships and a force of 18,000 men.

== Alliances ==
Following the invasion of Oman by the Persians under Nader Shah, the Shah of Iran, the Al Qasimi became increasingly distrustful of their new neighbours and one of Rashid bin Matar's first acts on acceding in 1747 was to conclude an alliance with Mulla Ali Shah, the former naval chief under Nader Shah who had taken the opportunity of the latter's assassination to seize Bandar Abbas. In 1755, Rashid together with Mulla Ali Shah attacked and took Qishm and Luft. This began a prolonged conflict with the Ma'in, who allied with Mir Mahanna, the Persian governor of Bandar Rig.

The overthrow of the Persians by the first of the Saidis of Muscat, the Imam Ahmad, created a new enemy for the Al Qasimis and they went to war with Muscat in 1758.

The successful alliance with Mullah Ali Shah was sealed when, in 1758, he married Rashid's daughter. This helped to restore an Al Qasimi presence in Qeshm in 1763, yielding a third of the island's revenues.

In 1759, the Qawasim under Rahma sailed together with a Huwala force from Bandar Charak (the port inland of Kish on the Persian coast), against Mir Muhanna, the piratical Sheikh of Bandar Rig (north-west of Bushire). In 1761, the Qawasim again moved in concert with Ali Shah after his family had been imprisoned on Hormuz by members of the Bani Ma’in tribe. During this conflict a Muscat boat headed for the British factory at Bandar Abbas was taken by the Qawasim, carrying 2,400 bags of rice and a ‘Leaguer of Arrack’. Ali Shah, a Muslim, made restitution for the rice but notably not for the alcoholic Arrack. A peace was brokered between the Bani Ma’in, Qawasim and Ali Shah, resulting once again in the division of the revenues from Qeshm, but also awarding the Qawasim ownership of the great ship, the Rahmani.

In 1763, the British yielded to pressure from the Persians and moved their principal Agency from Bandar Abbas to the Ottoman port at Basra, at the northernmost tip of the Arabian Gulf. A series of attacks were mounted by the British against Al Qasimi held Qeshm and Larak in March 1763, in an attempt to make up the losses caused by the move. Finding that Mullah Ali Shah had limited funds to pay their reparations and their forces diminished by spirited resistance, the British instead settled for the seizure of the Rahmani from its mooring on the island of Luft - an action that ultimately failed, both angering and emboldening the Qawasim.

In 1759, Rashid allied with the Sheikh of Charak against Mir Mahanna. Following the re-establishment of the British agency at Bushire in 1770, the British stepped up their maritime presence in the region. The Qawasim decision to support Oman against the Persians was an odd alliance, but it wasn't just local forces clashing and allying - the British, French, Dutch and indeed Persians were also circling each other. Alliances shifted quickly and by 1773 Rashid threw in his lot with the Sultan of Muscat in attacking Karim Khan, the Vakil of Persia, on the Persian coast, who had appointed a member of the Ma’in tribe, competitors to the Qawasim, as ruler of Bandar Abbas, Hormuz and Qeshm in an attempt to consolidate his rule over the coast of Persia. This resulted in the expulsion of the Al Qasimi Huwala andother Arab tribes from the three territories in 1765. Two years later, the Al Qasimi were once again at war with Muscat.

In 1777, Rashid resigned in favour of his son, Saqr bin Rashid, although he still remained active.

== Accusations of piracy ==
During Rashid's reign in the mid-eighteenth century, the Qawasim were engaged in persistent naval conflict along the Persian coast. His forces established temporary footholds at Qeshm, Laft, and Bandar Lengeh, and repeatedly clashed with Persian authorities at Bandar Abbas. In 1759 they created a "disturbance" at Bandar Abbas that resulted in injuries to the servants of the British Agency, and in 1761 Rashid led demonstrations against Bandar Lengeh and Ras Al Khaimah while also attempting, unsuccessfully, to seize Hormuz. These actions, though considered disruptive to regional trade and shipping, were framed by the British at the time as part of a power struggle between the Qawasim, Persia, and the Imamate of Oman.

Contemporary sources do not apply the label of piracy to Rashid bin Matar's activities. The characterization of the Qawasim as pirates only emerged in the years 1778–1780, after Rashid had been succeeded by his son Saqr bin Rashid, when their naval campaigns came to include indiscriminate attacks on commercial shipping and were perceived by the British as a systemic threat to trade in the Persian Gulf. Rashid, having retired from public life, nevertheless carried on a correspondence regarding British accusations of piracy with John Beaumont, the British Resident at Bushire.

The first accusations by the British of piracy occurred after an incident in 1778 where Qawasim forces attacked and boarded an East India Company vessel. In responding to the British complaint, Rashid bin Matar, who still held nominal authority, pointed out that the ship was running the colours of the Sultan of Muscat, with whom he was at war and therefore the taking of the ship was an acceptable act of war. In fact, the Omani flagged ship taken by the Qawasim, only on being overwhelmed, ran up British colours.

Lorimer, asserted that the Qawasim had begun, by 1778–1780, ‘to indulge in those indiscriminate piracies, by which a few years later, they were to acquire great notoriety’ but doesn't substantiate the charge with any instances of piracy - something that others reporting on the area at that time (such as Low in his History of the Indian Navy) also don't mention. The next reported incident of a piracy on the part of the Qawasim didn't actually take place until 20 years later, in 1797, under the rule of Rashid's son, Saqr.
