= Humaid bin Rashid Al Nuaimi II =

- Sheikh

Ruler of Ajman
- Reign: 1891–1900
- Predecessor: Rashid bin Humaid Al Nuaimi II
- Successor: Abdulaziz bin Humaid Al Nuaimi
- Died: 1900
- House: Al Nuaimi

Humaid bin Rashid Al Nuaimi II was the ruler of Ajman, one of the Trucial States which today form the United Arab Emirates (UAE), from 1891 to 1900.

Following his 1891 accession, Humaid was a signatory to the 1892 Exclusive Agreement, which bound the Trucial Rulers not to enter into 'any agreement or correspondence with any Power other than the British Government' and that without British assent, they would not 'consent to the residence within my territory of the agent of any other government' and that they would not 'cede, sell, mortgage or otherwise give for occupation any part of my territory, save to the British Government.

The agreement, which formalised the de facto British protectorate over the Trucial States, came at a time when commercial interest was being shown in the Trucial States by other nations, including Germany, Turkey and France. In particular, in 1887, the former deputy governor of Bushire, Sartip Haji Ahmad Khan, had landed in Abu Dhabi in August wearing full dress uniform. Travelling from Abu Dhabi to Dubai, the Sartip held secret meetings with the Trucial rulers and Rashid bin Maktoum of Dubai who eventually confided to Turki bin Said, the Sultan of Muscat, that Ahmad Khan had proposed an alliance with the Trucial rulers to eject the British. Turki informed the British who responded with the 1892 treaty.

September 1892 saw Humaid bin Rashid beating off an attack by Ajman's old rival and sometime ally, Sharjah together with Umm Al Quwain. Despatching a boat full of armed men to aid Humaid in meeting the attack, Rashid bin Maktoum breached the 1853 Maritime Truce and was forced to pay a fine.

Humaid bin Rashid was not popular among his peers, having failed to pay allowances from the state revenue to his family members. On the morning of 8 July 1900 he was murdered and his uncle, Abdulaziz bin Humaid, assumed power.
