= Salim bin Sultan Al Qasimi =

Ruler of Sharjah

- Sheikh

Ruler of Sharjah
- Reign: 1868–1883
- Predecessor: Khalid bin Sultan Al Qasimi
- Successor: Saqr bin Khalid Al Qasimi
- House: Al Qasimi

Salim bin Sultan Al Qasimi was Ruler of Sharjah, a Trucial State and today one of the United Arab Emirates, from 1868–1883. His rule was unusually tumultuous and marked by intrigue, the secession of Sharjah's dependencies and constant conflict. He was also briefly the Ruler of Ras Al Khaimah from 1868–1869 and its Wali, or governor, from 1908–1919.

== Accession ==
Salim bin Sultan was the son of the former Ruler of Sharjah, Sultan bin Saqr Al Qasimi. On his accession as Ruler of Sharjah, following the death of Khalid bin Sultan Al Qasimi at the hands of Zayed the Great in single combat in 1868, his nephew Humaid bin Abdullah Al Qasimi assumed the role of Wali of Ras Al Khaimah and the following year proclaimed independence from Sharjah.

The Saudi agent from Buraimi, who had been actively involved in stirring up a number of coastal disputes in the area, managed in April 1869 to organise a dynastic shuffle of remarkable proportions when he had Salim bin Sultan imprisoned, his brother Ibrahim bin Sultan Al Qasimi (who had long been Wali of Ras Al Khaimah under Sultan bin Saqr) established as Ruler of Ras Al Khaimah and Humaid bin Abdullah Al Qasimi of Ras Al Khaimah established as Ruler of Sharjah. This act of political prestidigitation was immediately followed by an outbreak of fighting in Sharjah and the Saudi agent was killed by gunfire. In what has been labelled an attempt to palliate the wrath of the Saudi King, Salim ceded his rule to his brother Ibrahim, but failing any reaction from Riyadh (and the move apparently being in name only), he reasserted his rule a few months later.

=== Breach of Maritime Truce ===
In May 1869, Salim and Ibrahim moved together against Humaid bin Abdullah at Ras Al Khaimah, landing 1,500 men from 32 boats. Humaid was supported by a force of some 500 men landed from Umm Al Quwain and fighting took place both at Jazirat Al Hamrah and in Ras Al Khaimah town. The British Resident, Colonel Lewis Pelly, on hearing of this breach of the maritime truce sailed from Lingeh in the Dalhousie with the gunboat Hugh Rose. Arriving at Ras Al Khaimah on 12 May, Pelly then ordered Salim and Ibrahim to withdraw their forces from Ras Al Khaimah by sunset the next day.

Alliances shifted quickly, however, and in 1871, Salim took advantage of Ibrahim's absence on a journey to Abu Dhabi and, with the support of Humaid bin Abdullah of Ras Al Khaimah together with the ruler of Umm Al Qawain, he cemented his ascendancy over Ibrahim by retaking total control of Sharjah. At the same time, Humaid bin Abdullah retook the dependencies of Sha'am, Rams and Shimal, which had managed to secede from Ras Al Khaimah.

=== Sharjah Dependencies ===
Hamriyah, which had previously rebelled against Sharjah, now did so again and its headman, Saif bin Abdulrahman Al Shamsi, led a confederation of smaller Sheikhs against Sharjah in 1873. By 1875 he had played a role as mediator between the ruler and the other Sheikhs (likely of Heera, Khan and Abu Hail) and proclaimed the independence of Hamriyah once again.

Salim appointed his younger brother Ahmed as Wali of Dibba, on the East coast, in 1871, granting him the revenues from the town which were however eroded by the encroachments of the troublesome Shihuh tribe.

Salim bin Sultan was deposed in 1883 by his nephew, Saqr bin Khalid Al Qasimi, who moved against him when he was travelling to Ras Al Khaimah (and his brother, Ahmed was on the island of Abu Musa, where he kept horses).

=== Wali of Ras Al Khaimah ===
Salim was appointed Wali of Ras Al Khaimah in 1908 and, despite suffering from paralysis, consolidated power to the point where the emirate was in all but name independent of Sharjah. His son Muhammad managed his affairs and he renounced his position in July 1919 to allow Salim's other son, Sultan to take power. Two years later, Salim would achieve Salim's long-held dream of independence for Ras Al Khaimah when the British recognised the emirate as a Trucial State in its own right.

Sheikh Salim bin Sultan died in August 1919.
