= Saqr bin Mohammed Al Qasimi =

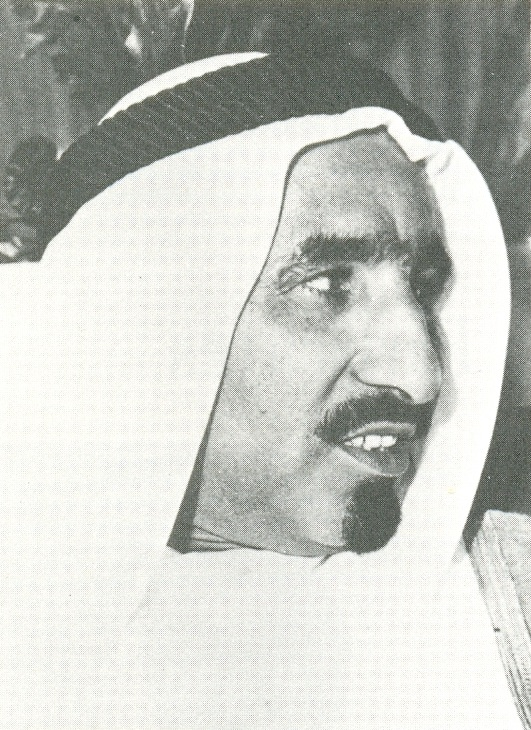
- Sheikh Saqr, c. 1948–1980

Ruler of Ras Al Khaimah
- Reign: 17 July 1948 – 27 October 2010
- Predecessor: Sultan bin Salim Al Qasimi
- Successor: Saud bin Saqr Al Qasimi
- Born: c. 1918–1920 (Note: A few sources such as The Daily Telegraph and the Khaleej Times gave 9 April 1918 as his birth date. However, given the absence of a record-keeping administration in the Trucial States at the time, it is unlikely that his birth can be dated with such precision. For instance, Reuters states that Sheikh Saqr was "believed to be in his late 90s" at the time of his death, while the BBC asserts that he "was in his early 90s" when he died. Many reputable sources (such as the Library of Congress Country Studies, reports from the British Foreign Office, and Burke's Peerage) give 1920 as his year of birth.); Ras Al Khaimah
- Died: 27 October 2010 (aged 91–92); Ras Al Khaimah, United Arab Emirates
- Issue: Khalid bin Saqr; Sultan bin Saqr; Saud bin Saqr; Mohammed bin Saqr; Omar bin Saqr; Talib bin Saqr; Faisal bin Saqr; Ahmed bin Saqr

Sheikh Saqr bin Mohammed Al Qasimi (Arabic: صقر بن محمد القاسمي; c. 1918–1920 – 27 October 2010) was the Ruler of the Emirate of Ras Al Khaimah from 1948 to 2010 and a co-founder of the United Arab Emirates. On 10 February 1972, under his leadership, Ras Al Khaimah become the seventh Trucial State to join the United Arab Emirates.

He became the Ruler of Ras Al Khaimah on 17 July 1948, when he overthrew his paternal uncle and father-in-law (Note: He married his paternal first cousin, Sheikha Nora bint Sultan Al Qasimi.) Sheikh Sultan bin Salim Al Qasimi in a coup d'état. Sheikh Saqr exiled Sultan to Sharjah. At the time of his death in 2010, Sheikh Saqr was the world's oldest reigning monarch at age ~90.

== Early life and education ==
Sheikh Saqr was born in the city of Ras Al Khaimah, where he was brought up in the care of his father, Sheikh Mohammed bin Salim, who ruled the emirate as regent for his ailing and paralysed father Salim bin Sultan Al Qasimi between 1917 and 1919. However, upon Mohammed bin Salim's death, his younger brother Sultan bin Salim took power. Sultan bin Salim Al Qasimi was recognised by the British as the Ruler of Ras Al Khaimah in 1921.

Sheikh Saqr received a religious and primary education. He learned to read from regionally renowned clerics as a youth, and later joined a semi-regular school in Ras Al Khaimah to further study reading and writing, as well as principles of mathematics. He studied oratory and Arabic arts.

Sheikh Saqr bin Muhammed Al Qasimi became the Ruler of the emirate of Ras Al Khaimah on 17 July 1948, after a coup against Sultan bin Salim Al Qasimi, who had allegedly neglected his subjects and alienated them by secretly signing oil concessions with British company PCL (Petroleum Concessions Ltd).

His early years in power necessitated meeting the challenge posed by the Shihuh, a tribe affiliated to the Sultan of Muscat, who nevertheless lived and had holdings and customary rights in both the mountainous and coastal areas of Ras Al Khaimah, for instance the previously rebellious village of Sha'am. Both these and the oft-secessionist tribes of Za'ab in Jazirat Al Hamra and the Tanaij of Rams were brought under Ras Al Khaimah or, as in the example of the Za'ab, exiled militarily. The ruler of the Za'ab (Jazirat Al Hamra) was among the only four independent rulers who signed the first treaty with the British in 1820, while Ras Al Khaimah town was burned by the British and the capital was at Khatt. Also, the current state of Ras Al Khaimah was only recognised in 1921. A British general travelling in 1925 also spoke about the Za'ab (Jazirat Al Hamra) as a state independent of any other sheikhdom.

== Politics and accession to UAE ==
After Sheikh Saqr gained complete control of Ras Al Khaimah, he began to delegate power through tribal leaders in order to avoid further conflict and to facilitate cooperation with the tribes. These tribal leaders functioned as middlemen between Sheikh Saqr and the people of Ras Al Khaimah; no tribal member could meet with the Emir without the permission of his respective Wali, or Sheikh.

Sheikh Saqr initially did not support Ras Al Khaimah's accession to the UAE when it was formed on 2 December 1971, due to a dispute with Iran over Persian Gulf islands that had prior to British domination of the region been administered by the Rulers of Ras Al Khaimah and Sharjah. Following the evacuation of the British and prior to the establishment of the UAE, an Iranian naval expeditionary force landed on the islands on 30 November 1970. Sheikh Saqr made his approval of Ras Al Khaimah joining the UAE contingent on the promise by Sheikh Zayed bin Sultan Al Nahyan of Abu Dhabi and Sheikh Rashid bin Saeed Al Maktoum of Dubai that the new UAE Federal Government would support Ras Al Khaimah's claim to the islands. Having obtained this promise, Ras Al Khaimah joined the UAE on 10 February 1972.

Sheikh Saqr appointed his oldest son, Khalid bin Saqr Al Qasimi, as the Crown Prince of Ras Al Khaimah in 1974. Sheikh Khalid was replaced by another of Sheikh Saqr's sons, Sheikh Saud bin Saqr Al Qasimi, on 28 April 2003, and Khalid chose the Omani capital Muscat for his unconditional exile. The transfer of power marked the first time in the UAE (there were regicidal coups in Sharjah, however) that a Crown Prince had been removed in such a manner; and, at the time of the decree, UAE Army soldiers and tanks were deployed around sensitive sites in Ras Al Khaimah in case of unrest, though they were not required.

Sheikh Saud was latterly seen by his father as a more appropriate choice as his successor, with one local official saying he was deemed "more suitable to implementing the interests of the UAE and its people", while another said "the country's leadership supported this transfer (of power) which took place smoothly. There are no problems".

== Achievements ==
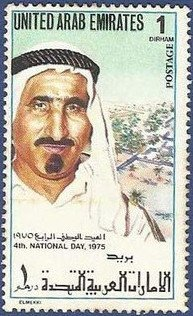
Sheikh Saqr on a 1975 issued stamp

In his 62 years as ruler, Sheikh Saqr of Ras Al Khaimah vowed to sow unity among the various tribes under his rule. He sought to develop his Emirate economically, socially and culturally and knew that education was fundamental to that pursuit. With the goal of increasing literacy and building up his people, Sheikh Saqr promoted education, built modern schools, and made education compulsory for both sexes, while also offering incentives to encourage people to go to school.

Providing reliable healthcare was also chief among his achievements. He oversaw the set-up of the Kuwaiti Hospital and a further three hospitals in his Emirate during his reign.

Sheikh Saqr also built Ras Al Khaimah's organizational, financial and administrative institutions from scratch, for the first time bringing proper government administration to the Emirate.

His vision saw the development of key infrastructure, including Ras Al Khaimah Airport, which opened in 1976 and, in 1977, Saqr Port, which today is the largest bulk-handling port in the Middle East region. In addition, he set up companies such as RAK Rock and Julphar Pharmaceuticals, in the Emirate, some of which went on to become industry leaders.

== Death and succession ==
Sheikh Saqr died on 27 October 2010 after suffering from an illness for several months. The Crown Prince, Saud bin Saqr Al Qasimi, succeeded him. Khalid bin Saqr Al Qasimi posted a web video proclaiming himself ruler of Ras Al Khaimah shortly after Sheikh Saqr's death. The video was part of a broader campaign Khalid had launched to gain the support of the United States and regional power brokers.

Khalid reportedly had little support among the tribes of Ras Al Khaimah or the leaders of the other six emirates. The Federal Supreme Council, made up of the rulers of each of the UAE's seven emirates, quickly declared its support for Sheikh Saud's succession. Sheikh Saud declared forty days of mourning following his appointment.
