= Sultan bin Saqr Al Qasimi =

Sheikh of the al-Qawasim family (1781–1866)

- Sheikh

Ruler of Sharjah
- Reign: 1803–1809
- Predecessor: Saqr bin Rashid Al Qasimi
- Successor: Hassan bin Rahma Al Qasimi
- Reign: 1820–1866
- Predecessor: Hassan bin Rahma Al Qasimi
- Successor: Khalid bin Sultan Al Qasimi
- Died: 1866
- House: Al Qasimi

Sheikh Sultan bin Saqr Al Qasimi (1781–1866) was the Sheikh of the Qawasim and ruled the towns of Sharjah, Ras Al Khaimah, Jazirah Al Hamra and Rams; all within the then Trucial States and now part of the United Arab Emirates. Briefly a dependent of the first Saudi Kingdom, his rule over Ras Al Khaimah ran from 1803 to 1809, when he was deposed by order of the Saudi Amir (in favour of Hassan bin Rahma Al Qasimi) and restored in 1820, going on to rule until his death in 1866 at the age of 85. He was Ruler of Sharjah from 1814 to 1866, with a brief disruption to that rule in 1840 by his elder son Saqr. He was a signatory to various treaties with the British, starting with the General Maritime Treaty of 1820 and culminating in the Perpetual Maritime Truce of 1853.

== Rule ==
A characteristic of Sultan's rule is that he placed relatives as walis or headmen of the emirates under his rule and so Ras Al Khaimah was effectively ruled by Mohammed bin Saqr, Sultan's brother, from 1823 until his death in 1845, while another brother, Salih bin Saqr, ruled Sharjah until 1838, when he was replaced with Sultan's son, Saqr. In 1840, however, Saqr declared independence from his father and reduced the tax on pearl divers to bolster his support in the town. Sultan eventually agreed to accept tribute from Sharjah in return for allowing Saqr to rule, but in December that year, Salih bin Saqr and a group loyal to him surprised Saqr bin Sultan in his sleep and took him prisoner. Escaping, he was allowed to resume his position in Sharjah by his father until 1846, when he was killed in a fight with Umm Al Quwain. He was replaced by Abdullah bin Sultan who was, however, killed in fighting with Hamriyah in 1855.

With the death of Abdullah, Sultan placed his grandson, Muhammed bin Saqr, as wali of Sharjah. However, Khalid bin Sultan, a son of Sultan's, disputed his rule and in 1859, Sharjah was divided between the two. Sultan was by now in his dotage and took no active role in the conflict over Sharjah, which was eventually settled when Khalid shot Mohammed and threw his body into a well in the desert in late 1860.

=== Accession ===
Sultan bin Saqr became Sheikh of the Qawasim at a time when the tribe was at war with the Sultan of Muscat, who had laid claim to sovereignty of the coastal communities of the Southern Persian Gulf. A number of incidents took place involving British shipping, including the British appearing to support and be in co-operation with the Sultan. The Qawasim's aggressive reaction to the application of British force led to a number of attacks by Qawasim forces. In 1806, Sultan entered into a truce which led to a peace treaty with the British. This treaty, signed on 6 February 1806, called for the restitution of the 'Trimmer', a captured British ship, and bound the Qawasim to respect shipping flying the British flag. In return, Qawasim ships were to enjoy unfettered access to Indian ports.

=== Exile ===
Two years' peace in the Persian Gulf followed the signing of the treaty, allowing Sultan to focus his energies against his old enemy the Sultan of Muscat. In May 1808 he took Khor Fakkan from Muscat. However, soon after this victory, Sultan was removed as head of the Qawasim by the Saudi Amir and then as Ruler of Ras Al Khaimah the following year. Husain bin Ali, the Sheikh of Rams and Dhayah was appointed head wali, or tax collector, for the Saudis in Trucial Oman. At the same time, the Saudis took the forts of Fujairah, Al Bithnah and Khor Fakkan.

Sultan bin Saqr was held prisoner at the Al Saud capital of Diriyah, today a suburb of Riyadh, in 1809, having been ordered to attend the Saudi ruler there. He escaped and travelled via Yemen and Mokha to Muscat, where he was received by Saiyid Said, the Sultan of Oman.

An increase in attacks on British shipping in both the Persian Gulf and the Indian Ocean culminated in a demand, made by Husain bin Ali, that British ships pay tribute to the Qawasim. Alongside taking part in Saudi-led expeditions against other Gulf ports, the Qawasim were in conflict with the Persians as well as the Sultan of Muscat and still attacking British shipping. It was decided to mount an expedition to support the Sultan as well as to bring down the Qawasim.

=== Persian Gulf campaign of 1809 ===
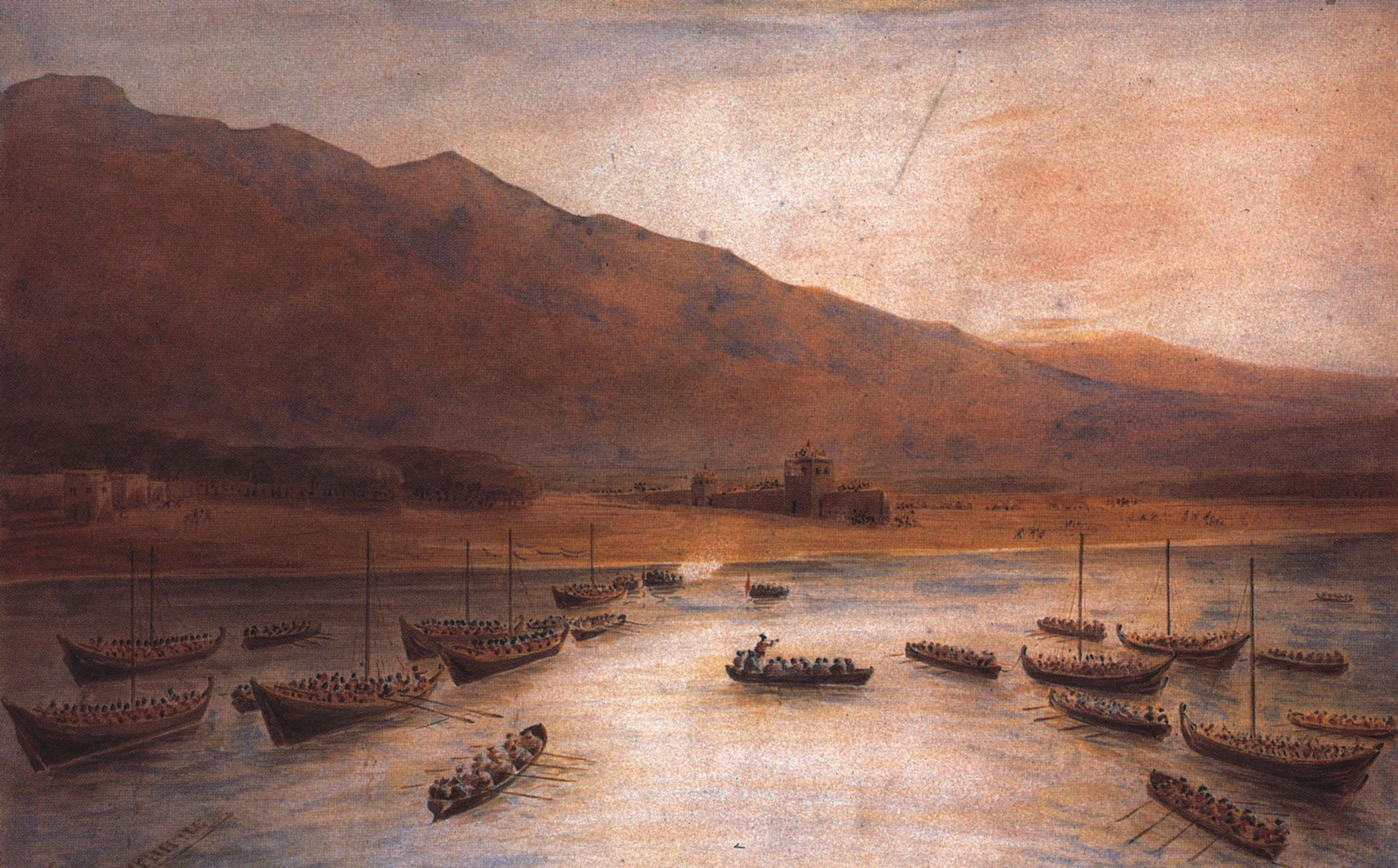
Ras Al Khaimah was sacked in by the British in the punitive 1809 expedition.

The Persian Gulf campaign of 1809 commenced with the arrival of the British fleet off Ras Al Khaimah on 11 November 1809, bombarding the town the next day. After an abortive landing attempt took place on the 12 November, the British took Lingeh and Luft before taking Khor Fakkan for the Sultan of Muscat and then proceeding to Rams, Jazirah Al Hamrah, Ajman and Sharjah.

Sultan bin Saqr, the legitimate ruler of Ras Al Khaimah, still being in exile, the British did not attempt to secure a treaty following the 1809 expedition.

In 1813, an expedition by the Sultan of Muscat to Ras Al Khaimah with the objective of restoring Sultan bin Saqr failed. However, a further sally the next year saw Sultan once again installed as Ruler not of Ras Al Khaimah, but of Sharjah and Lingeh, the latter being his principle residence. Ras Al Khaimah remained under the effective rule of the Saudi dependent, Hassan bin Rahmah.

=== The 1819 expedition and 1820 treaty ===
Under Hassan, the Qawasim found themselves not only in conflict with Muscat, but increasingly with British shipping and a series of incidents led to a peace treaty being signed in 1814 which barely held. In 1819 the British embarked on a second Persian Gulf Campaign and this time sacked Ras Al Khaimah, removed Hassan bin Rahmah and then proceeded to bombard and destroy the fortifications and larger vessels of Jazirah Al Hamra, Umm Al Quwain, Ajman, Fasht, Sharjah, Abu Hail, and Dubai.

Sultan signed the General Maritime Treaty of 1820 on the 4 February 1820 at Falayah Fort inland of Ras Al Khaimah as 'Sheikh of Sharjah and Ras Al Khaimah'. Hassan bin Rahmah had earlier signed the treaty as 'Sheikh of Khatt and Falaiha, formerly of Ras Al Khaimah'.

Sultan moved quickly to assert his influence, removing the ageing Wahhabi Sheikh of Rams and Dhayah to Sharjah and replacing him with the son of a former Sheikh and then placing his own son Muhammad as Wali over Ras Al Khaimah. Abdulla bin Rashid of Umm Al Quwain recognised Sultan's primacy at the time. Of the Northern Emirates, only Ajman considered itself independent. By 1824, Sultan had installed a pliable client in Umm Al Quwain and obtained acknowledgement of his suzerainty from Ajman. He married into the Ruling family of Dubai in 1825.

Later in 1820, Sultan built Sharjah Fort. Early British records of 1830 note the fort was located "a little inland, mounting six pieces of cannon, together with some detached towers. In case of alarm from an enemy, it is stockaded round with date trees and wood sufficient for repelling the attack of Arabs although of little service against regular troops."

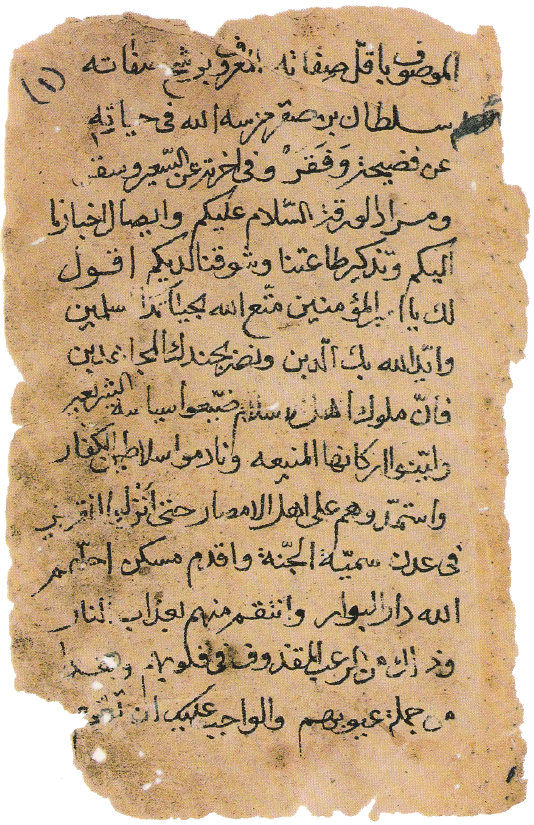
Part of the message from Isaaq Sultan Farah Guled to Sultan Saqr in the 1820s

In the 1820s the Isaaq Sultan Farah Guled penned a letter to Sultan bin Saqr Al Qasimi requesting military assistance and joint religious war against the British. He was praised as a pious and righteous ruler upon the sunnah.

=== War with Abu Dhabi ===
Sultan rebuilt the town of Ras Al Khaimah, using the rubble of the old town to build the new. By 1828, the town was once again established as a settlement. Incensed by a coalition between his old foe the Sultan of Muscat and the Bani Yas of Abu Dhabi, Sultan used the opportunity of their expedition against Bahrain to blockade the town of Abu Dhabi. The blockade was lifted in June 1829 after peace-making efforts by the Sheikh of Lingeh, both parties being keen to take part in the annual pearling season. By 1831, however, Bedouin loyal to Abu Dhabi raided Ajman and Sultan joined with Ajman and declared war on Abu Dhabi. A brief peace was negotiated, but pearling boats from both sides were seized. In 1833, the Al Bu Falasah section of the Bani Yas seceded to Dubai under Obeid bin Said bin Rashid alongside Maktoum bin Butti bin Sohail and Sultan decided to use the opportunity to move against Abu Dhabi once again.

Recalling Sharjah's boats from the pearl banks (a highly unpopular move, taking place at the height of the season), Sultan embarked for Abu Dhabi with 22 boats carrying 520 men under himself and Hassan bin Rahmah and 80 boats carrying 700 men from the Al Bu Falasah and other secessionists of Dubai. On 10 September 1833, the allies landed four miles from Abu Dhabi and encamped, ready to move on the town the next day. However, at sunrise they discovered they were surrounded by a large force of Bani Yas and Manasir Bedouin. The invaders fled to their boats, but these were left high and dry by the tide and a rout followed, 45 men killed and 235 taken prisoner (and made to return to their homes in Abu Dhabi), while the Al Qasimi lost six boats and the Dubai contingent lost 60 of its 80 boats. Undeterred, Sultan allied with the Sheikhs of Lingeh and Ajman and once again sailed against Abu Dubai in November 1833. This expedition, failing to take Abu Dhabi by force of arms, blockaded the town.

The blockade was effective: 30 Abu Dhabi boats were captured by the Al Qasimi, while a sharp engagement with Sultan's Dubai allies resulted in 10 dead on the Abu Dhabi side. A caravan of 50 camels carrying dates was captured and, while Abu Dhabi was reduced to dire straits by the blockade, moves against Dubai's supporters by land and the necessity to bring water and supplies from Sharjah and Ras Al Khaimah meant the blockading force also suffered. A short-lived peace was arranged, followed by a more enduring arrangement in 1834 under which Abu Dhabi agreed that the people of Dubai should be subjects of Sharjah.

=== Perpetual Maritime Truce of 1853 ===
The war, the most enduring and damaging so far of any between the coastal communities of the Persian Gulf, prepared the ground for the Perpetual Maritime Truce of 1853, commencing with a series of treaties negotiated by the British to cover a truce for the annual pearling season, which took effect from 1835 onwards. These annual treaties lasted for eight months each but the third treaty, at the insistence of Sultan bin Saqr, was extended to a full year and subsequent treaties to 1882 were annual. At this point, it was proposed to extend the treaty to a duration of ten years and this, broadly, held (there are several instances of squabbling and jostling on the pearl banks). Subsequently, in May 1853, the Sheikhs signed the Perpetual Maritime Truce, three of them signing as 'Chief' of their towns (Umm Al Qawain, Ajman and Dubai) and two, Saeed bin Tahnoon and Sultan bin Saqr signing as head of their tribes - Bani Yas and Al Qasimi respectively.

=== Agreement with Muscat ===
Ending almost a century of on and off conflict with Muscat, Sultan Bin Saqr in 1850 agreed a compromise with the Sultan of Muscat in which Al Qasimi rule was agreed north of the line between Sharjah and Khor Kalba on the East coast, but excluding the rough, high land North of the line between Sha'am on the West and Dibba on the East coast.

=== The Siege of Hamriyah ===
A blood-feud broke out in Sharjah between members of the Huwalah and Shwaihiyin tribes in Sharjah and Sultan moved the Shwaihiyin, a body of recent immigrants to Sharjah who numbered some 500 fighting men, to Hamriyah, a town on the northern border between Ajman and Sharjah. This provoked the first of what would be many rebellions by Hamriyah against Al Qasimi rule, which Sultan put down by besieging Hamriyah in May 1855 with a force of his own men as well as some 3,000 from Ajman and five artillery pieces. Hamriyah was defended by some 800 men and Abdullah bin Sultan was killed in the fighting. With only ten men lost by the defenders of Hamriyah (and some 60 dead among the besiegers), the British were brought in by Sultan to mediate. It had been Sultan's hope that the captain of the British ship 'Clive', Kemball, would enforce his writ over Hamriyah, but Kemball refused to attack Hamriyah on Sultan's behalf and instead negotiated a peace between which saw the Shwaihiyin removed from Hamriyah. In 1860, the headman of Hamriyah, Abdulrahman bin Saif, led a force in support of Sharjah against the rebellious communities of Khan and Abu Hail.

Sheikh Sultan bin Saqr Al Qasimi died in 1866 at the age of 85. He was succeeded by Khalid bin Sultan Al Qasimi.
