= Sha'am =

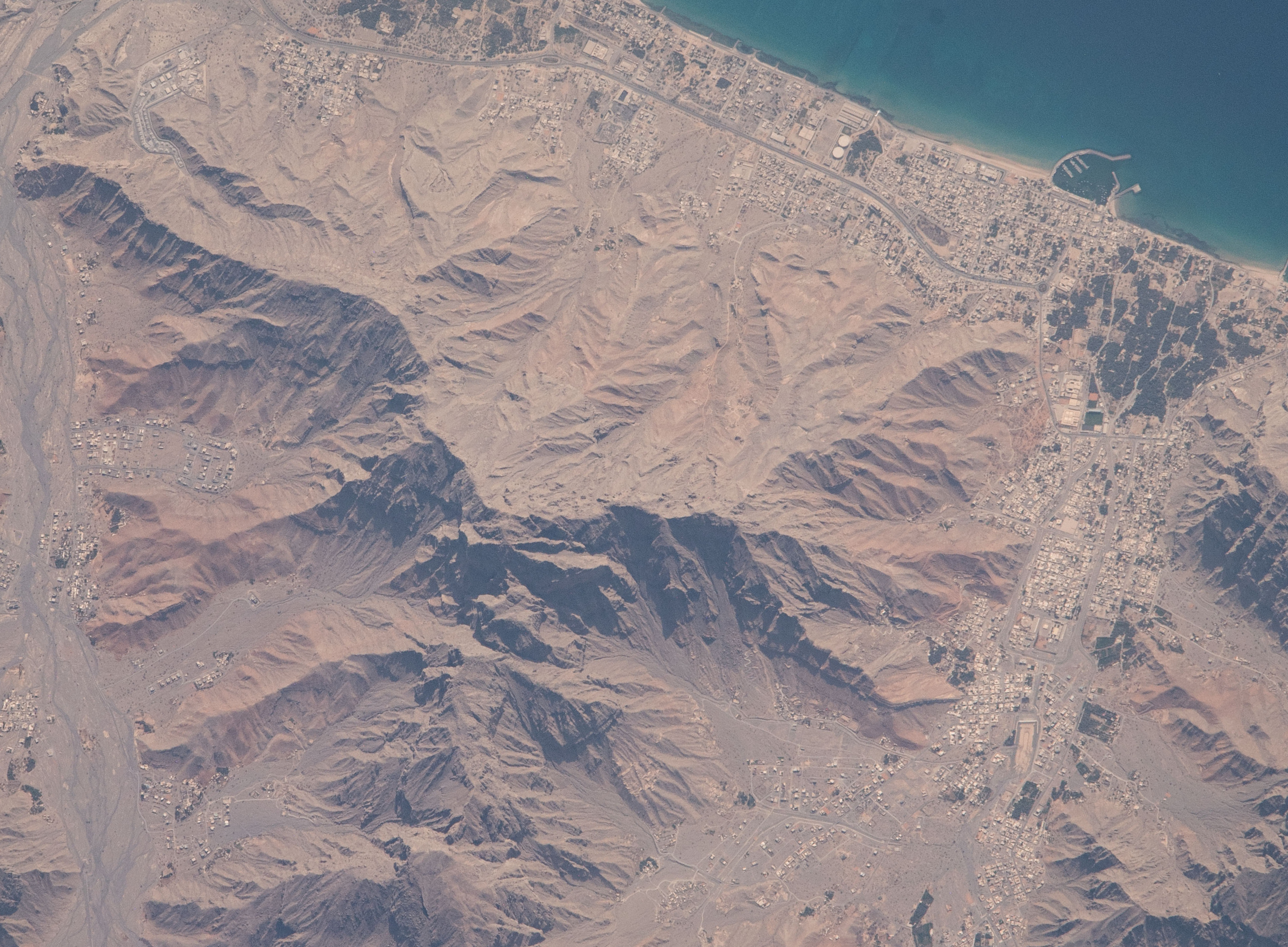

- Location within United Arab Emirates
- Coordinates: 26°1′28″N 56°5′2″E
- Country: United Arab Emirates
- Emirate: Ras Al Khaimah

Area
  - Urban: 0.776 km^{2} (0.300 sq mi)
- Elevation: 107 m (351 ft)

Population (2023)
  - City: 3,014

Sha'am is a village in Northern Ras Al Khaimah, in the United Arab Emirates (UAE).

== History ==
A coastal village which traded on the cultivation of its rich hinterland at the foot of the Hajar Mountains, Sha'am considered itself essentially independent from Ras Al Khaimah and frequently asserted this independence. One such attempt by Sha'am to secede from Ras Al Khaimah under Sheikh Humaid bin Abdullah Al Qasimi in 1885 resulted in Humaid retaking the village and extracting a fine of 1,600 Marie Theresa Dollars.

By the turn of the 20th century, Sha'am consisted of some 300 houses, mostly of mud brick construction and home to settled members of the Bani Shutair section of the Shihhu Bedouin tribe. They subsisted through fishing, pearl diving (using two pearl boats) and date cultivation, as well as the sale of dry fish and firewood which they would take to Sharjah town on the 6 or 7 coasters the villagers owned.
