= Al Qasimi =

Ruling royal family of Sharjah and Ras Al Khaimah

- Royal house
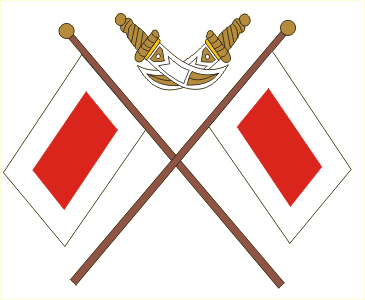

- Parent family: Banu Hashim; Banu Husayn; Sharif; al-Musawi; al-Naqwi
- Country: United Arab Emirates
- Founded: 1722; 304 years ago
- Founder: Sheikh Rahma bin Matar Al-Qasimi
- Current head: Sharjah: Sultan bin Muhammad Al-Qasimi; Ras Al Khaimah: Saud bin Saqr Al-Qasimi
- Titles: Emir; Sheikh
- Style: His/Her Highness

The Al Qasimi (Arabic: القاسمي, spelled sometimes as Al Qassimi or Al Qassemi; plural: Al Qawasem Arabic: القواسم and, archaically, Joasmee) is an Arab dynasty and tribe that rules Sharjah and Ras Al Khaimah, today forming two of the seven emirates of the United Arab Emirates. They are one of the longest reigning royal families in the Arabian peninsula. Historically, they also controlled the town of Bandar Lengeh on the Iranian coast of the Persian Gulf from 1779, when the Zand rulers formally recognised a Qasimi as local governor (farmandar), until 1887, when the Tehran government evicted them as part of its policy of reclaiming its Gulf littoral — the territory having always remained nominally under Iranian sovereignty rather than constituting an independent Qasimi domain.

The Qawasem were a confederation of Sunni tribes in south eastern Gulf region surrounding the cities of Ras Al Khaimah and Sharjah. They were strong rivals of the Omani empire and pursued naval domination in the Persian Gulf. The British Empire branded the Qawasem as "pirates" and launched two major military raids against them in 1809 and 1819.

== Origin ==
Flag of the Al Qawasim prior to 1820. Flown after 1820 during war time only. The motto reads "A victory from Allah and an imminent conquest".

The Qawasim tribe from which dynasty originates are Huwala, their ancestors migrating and keeping connections between the Arabian Peninsula and Persia, in particular maintaining their rulership over the town of Lengeh on the coast of Hormozgan province. The Qawasim tribe itself is of Hashemite origin, descending from Husayn ibn Ali, through their eponymous ancestor Al Qasim bin Idris bin Ja’far al-Zaki.

During the 18th century, the Arabian Peninsula witnessed a revolutionary socio-political and religious transformation under the reformers of the Muwahhidun (Unitarian) movement led by Muhammad ibn 'Abd al-Wahhab, often referred as Wahhabis. Embracing his ideals, the Qawasim robustly championed the doctrines of the Muwahhidun in the Gulf region and became a close ally of the Emirate of Diriyah.

By the early 19th century, the Qawasim emerged as a maritime power based both in Ras Al Khaimah on the southern shore of the Persian Gulf and Qishm, Bandar Abbas and Lingeh on the northern shore.

=== Maritime power ===
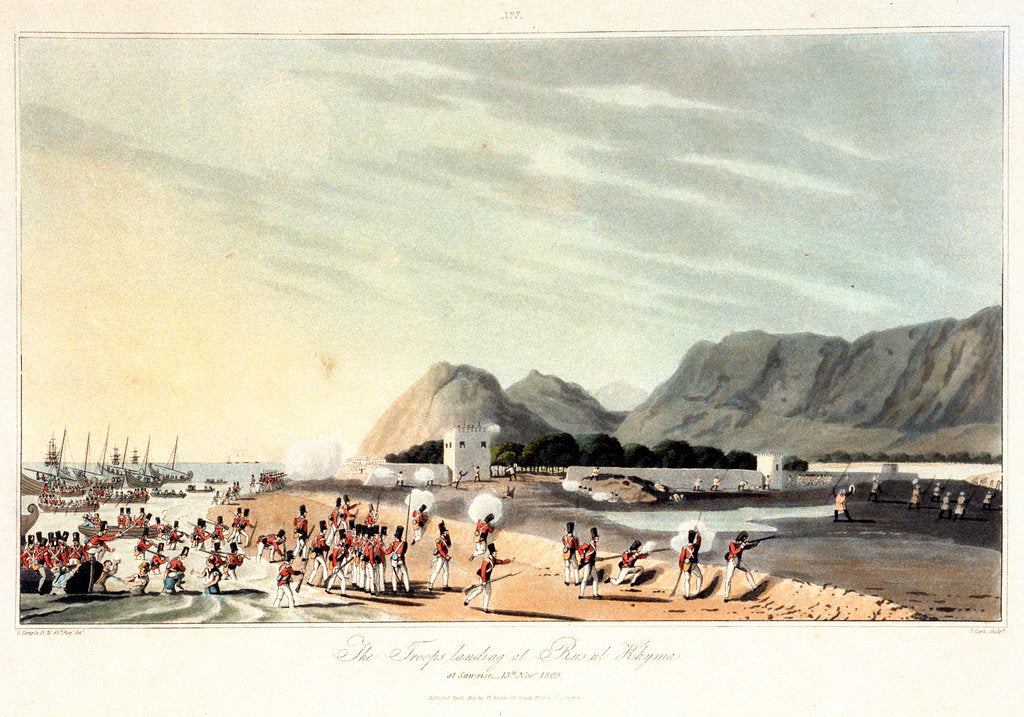
British naval fleet attack on Ras Al Khaimah on 13 November 1809

The Qawasim was a powerful naval force and sought to end the rising European colonial infiltration on their trade and commercial routes.

The British-allied Omani Empire had been the traditional enemy of the Qawasim over issues related to border disputes, religious differences and naval dominance in the Gulf. Qawasim control of trade in the Persian Gulf area led to wars with Oman and eventually with Oman's ally, Britain, and to the Qawasim (Joasmees to the British) being labelled by the British as pirates. This led to the identification of the southern shore of the Persian Gulf as the 'Pirate Coast', although following the General Maritime Treaty of 1820 and the 1853 Perpetual Maritime Peace, the various coastal emirates in the area became known as the Trucial States.

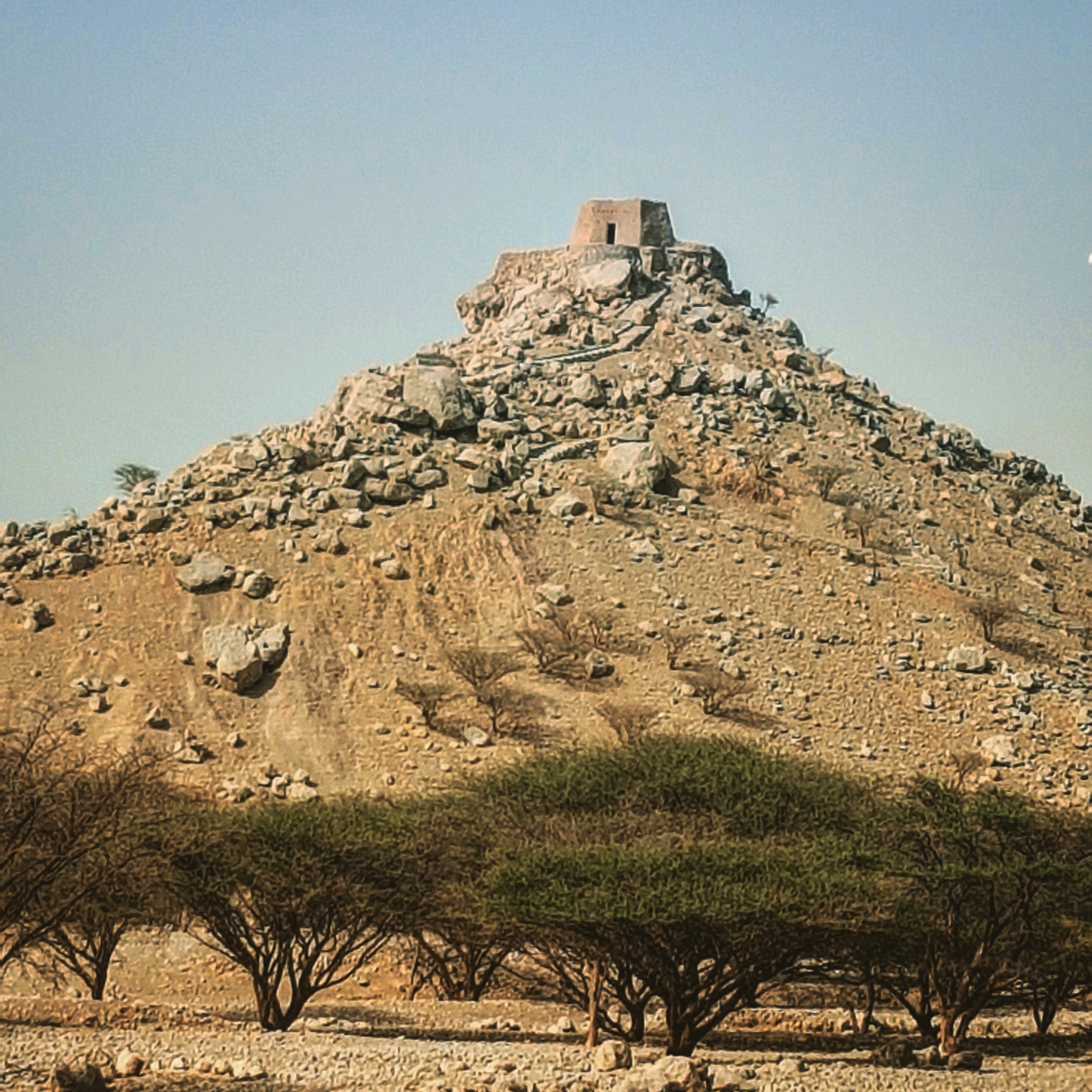
Dhayah Fort at the hill top. In 1819 it was the last Al-Qasimi stronghold to fall in the Persian Gulf campaign of 1819. The fall of Dhayah was to pave the way for the signing of the General Maritime Treaty of 1820.

Beginning from 1804, there was a spike in Qawasim naval attacks on local trading ships. Following decades of incidents where native shipping had fallen foul of the aggressive Al Qasimi, a first British expeditionary force embarked for Ras Al Khaimah in 1809, the Persian Gulf campaign of 1809. This campaign led to the signing of a peace treaty between the British and Hussan Bin Rahmah, the Al Qasimi leader. This treaty broke down in 1815 and, in 1819, the British mounted a second, altogether more successful, punitive campaign against the Qawasim in Ras Al Khaimah under William Keir Grant.

The case against the Qawasim has been contested by the historian, author and current Ruler of Sharjah, Sultan bin Mohammed Al Qasimi in his book The Myth of Arab Piracy in the Gulf, in which he argues that the charges amount to a 'casus belli' by the East India Company, which sought to limit or eliminate the 'informal' Arab trade with India, and presents a number of internal communications between the Bombay Government and its officials, which shed doubt on many of the key charges made by British historian J.G. Lorimer in his seminal history of the affair.

At the time, the Chief Secretary of the Government of Bombay, F. Warden, presented a minute which laid blame for the piracy on the Wahhabi influence on the Al Qasimi and the interference of the East India Company in native affairs. Warden also successfully argued against a proposal to install the Sultan of Muscat as Ruler of the whole peninsula. Warden's arguments and proposals likely influenced the shape of the eventual treaty concluded with the Sheikhs of the Gulf coast.

That 1820 treaty asserted, 'There shall be a cessation of plunder and piracy by land and sea on the part of the Arabs, who are parties to this contract, for ever.' It then goes on to define piracy as being any attack that is not an action of 'acknowledged war'. The 'pacificated Arabs' agreed, on land and sea, to carry a flag being a red rectangle contained within a white border of equal width to the contained rectangle, 'with or without letters on it, at their option'. This flag was to be a symbol of peace with the British government and each other.

The treaty having been signed by Keir Grant and all of the Trucial Rulers, the Government in Bombay made clear that while it was happy with Grant's management of the military expedition, it was most dissatisfied with his leniency over the coastal tribes and desired, 'if it were not too late, to introduce some conditions of greater stringency'. Grant's response was spirited, pointing out that to have enforced extreme measures would have meant pursuing the chiefs into the interior rather than accepting their voluntary submission. This would have contravened Grant's instructions. In the end, Bombay allowed the treaty to stand.

Alongside their stronghold in the Persian Gulf & Gulf of Oman the Qawasem were active both militarily and economically in the Gulf of Aden and as far west as the Mocha on the Red Sea. They had numerous commercial ties with the Somalis, leading vessels from Ras Al Khaimah and the Persian Gulf to regularly attend trade fairs in the large ports of Berbera and Zeila. In the 1830s the Isaaq Sultan Farah Guled and Haji Ali penned a letter to Sultan bin Saqr Al Qasimi of Ras Al Khaimah requesting military assistance and joint religious war against the British.

== The Al Qasimi rulers ==
1. Sheikh Rahma bin Matar Al Qasimi (1722–1747)
2. Sheikh Rashid bin Matar Al Qasimi (1747–1777)
3. Sheikh Saqr bin Rashid Al Qasimi (1777–1803)
4. Sheikh Sultan bin Saqr Al Qasimi (1803–1808)
5. Sheikh Hassan bin Rahma Al Qasimi (1814–1820)
6. Sheikh Sultan bin Saqr Al Qasimi (1820–1866)
7. Sheikh Khalid bin Sultan Al Qasimi (1866–1867)

=== List of Ras Al Khaimah rulers ===
1. Sheikh Ibrahim bin Sultan Al Qasimi (1866 – May 1867)
2. Sheikh Khalid bin Sultan Al Qasimi (May 1867 – 14 April 1868)
3. Sheikh Salim bin Sultan Al Qasimi (14 April 1868 – 1869)
4. Sheikh Humaid bin Abdullah Al Qasimi (1869 – August 1900)
5. Sheikh Khalid bin Ahmad Al Qasimi (1914–1921)
6. Sheikh Sultan bin Salim Al Qasimi (19 July 1921 – February 1948)
7. Sheikh Saqr bin Mohammed Al Qasimi (February 1948 – 27 October 2010)
8. Sheikh Saud bin Saqr Al Qasimi (27 October 2010 – present)

=== List of Sharjah rulers ===
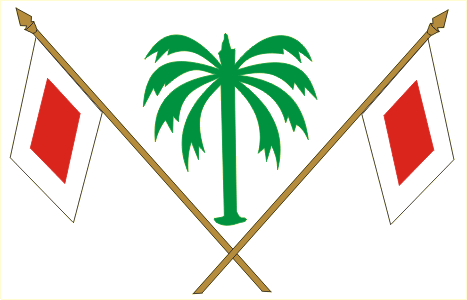

1. Sheikh Sultan bin Saqr Al Qasimi (1803–1866)
2. Sheikh Khalid bin Sultan Al Qasimi (1866 – 14 April 1868)
3. Sheikh Salim bin Sultan Al Qasimi (14 April 1868 – March 1883)
4. Sheikh Ibrahim bin Sultan Al Qasimi (1869–1871)
5. Sheikh Saqr bin Khalid Al Qasimi (March 1883 – 1914)
6. Sheikh Khalid bin Ahmad Al Qasimi (13 April 1914 – 21 November 1924)
7. Sheikh Sultan bin Saqr Al Qasimi II (21 November 1924 – 1951)
8. Sheikh Saqr bin Sultan Al Qasimi (May 1951 – 24 June 1965) – first time ruling
9. Sheikh Khalid bin Mohammed Al Qasimi (24 June 1965 – 24 January 1972)
10. Sheikh Saqr bin Sultan Al Qasimi (25 January 1972 – 1972) – second time ruling
11. Sheikh Sultan bin Muhammad Al Qasimi (1972 – 17 June 1987) – first time ruling
12. Sheikh Abdulaziz bin Mohammed Al Qasimi (17–23 June 1987) removed previous sheikh during coup in Sharjah
13. Sheikh Sultan bin Muhammad Al Qasimi (23 June 1987 – present) – second time ruling after being restored

==== Deputy Rulers of Sharjah ====
- Sheikh Ahmed bin Sultan Al Qasimi (30 June 1990 – 9 July 2020), a son of Sultan bin Saqr Al Qasimi II
- Sheikh Abdullah bin Salem bin Sultan Al Qasimi (2008 – present)
- Sheikh Sultan bin Ahmed Al Qasimi (9 August 2021 – present), a son of Ahmed bin Sultan

=== Family tree ===
Rahma bin Matar Al Qasimi | Rashid bin Matar Al Qasimi
Hassan bin Rahma Al Qasimi | Saqr bin Rashid Al Qasimi
Sultan bin Saqr Al Qasimi
Ahmad bin Sultan Al Qasimi | Ibrahim bin Sultan Al Qasimi | Abdullah bin Sultan Al Qasimi | Khalid bin Sultan Al Qasimi | Salim bin Sultan Al Qasimi
Khalid bin Ahmad Al Qasimi | Humaid bin Abdullah Al Qasimi | Saqr bin Khalid Al Qasimi | Muhammad bin Salim Al Qasimi | Sultan bin Salim Al Qasimi
Sultan bin Saqr Al Qasimi II | Muhammad bin Saqr Al Qasimi | Saqr bin Muhammad Al Qasimi | Faisal bin Sultan Al Qassimi | Faham bin Sultan Al Qasimi
Saqr bin Sultan Al Qasimi | Khalid bin Muhammad Al Qasimi | Abdulaziz bin Muhammad Al Qasimi | Sultan bin Muhammad Al Qasimi | Saud bin Saqr Al Qasimi | Mohammed bin Faisal Al Qasimi

== Current Al Qasimi rulers ==
- Sultan bin Muhammad Al-Qasimi, ruler of the emirate of Sharjah, UAE
- Saud bin Saqr Al Qasimi, ruler of the emirate of Ras Al Khaimah, UAE

== Historical flags ==
Flag of the Al Qawasim prior to 1820. Flown after 1820 during war time only. The motto reads "A victory from Allah and an imminent conquest".

Flag of the Al Qawasim proceeding the General Maritime Treaty of 1820.

== See also ==
- List of Sunni Muslim dynasties
- History of Ras Al Khaimah
- History of Sharjah
- Piracy in the Persian Gulf
- Al Qasimi Palace
