= Khalid bin Sultan Al Qasimi (ruler) =

- Sheikh

Ruler of Sharjah
- Reign: 1866–1868
- Predecessor: Sultan bin Saqr Al Qasimi
- Successor: Salim bin Sultan Al Qasimi
- Died: 1868
- House: Al Qasimi

Sheikh Khalid bin Sultan Al Qasimi was Ruler of Sharjah, a Trucial State and now one of the United Arab Emirates, from 1866 to 1868 and of Ras Al Khaimah from 1866 to 1867. His short rule was most notable for the means of his accession, which involved the murder of his nephew, and also his death, at the hands of Abu Dhabi Sheikh Zayed bin Khalifa Al Nahyan in single combat.

== Accession ==
On the death of Abdulla bin Sultan Al Qasimi during the fighting for Hamriyah in 1855, the administration of Sharjah (under the head of the Al Qasimi tribe and federation, Sultan bin Saqr Al Qasimi) fell to a Wali, Mohammed bin Saqr Al Qasimi, a grandson of Sultan bin Saqr's.

Khalid bin Sultan proceeded to intrigue against Mohammed bin Saqr, who was his nephew. At this time, Sultan bin Saqr was in his dotage and had lost both the use of his hearing and memory and took little or no part in proceedings. By 1859, Khalid had collected strong support from the families of the town and the area became effectively divided between two groups, one supporting Mohammed and one behind Khalid.

Khalid and Mohammed rode out together into the desert in late 1860 and Khalid shot Mohammed, dumping his body in a well. Seeking British recognition for his accession, he was rebuffed with the Resident refusing to converse 'with one so recently and fearfully polluted.'

=== Ruler of Sharjah and Ras Al Khaimah ===
With his father in his dotage, Khaled built a fort between Ajman and Al Hamriyah, at Al Zorah. This was done with Saudi support, Khalid having accepted advice from the Saudi agent, Turki bin Ahmad Al Sudairi. The move to build a Saudi-backed fort in the area was deeply unpopular with the local communities and rulers, a reservation the British agreed with and so, in January 1866, HMS Highflyer bombarded the fort and destroyed it.

Sultan bin Saqr Al Qasimi died in 1866 at the age of 85 and Khalid proclaimed himself the independent Sheikh of Sharjah, while Ibrahim bin Sultan Al Qasimi declared himself Sheikh of Ras Al Khaimah. This was to mark the first occasion in which the two Emirates were under different leadership. However, in May 1867, Khalid led a successful attack on Ras Al Khaimah, expelled Ibrahim and declared himself Ruler. The town of Ras Al Khaimah and its dependencies were then re-incorporated into Sharjah.

A number of clashes took place between the forces loyal to Sharjah under Khalid and those of Abu Dhabi under Zayed bin Khalifa Al Nahyan. In April 1868, during one such armed conflict with Abu Dhabi, Sheikh Zayed advanced ahead of his troops and challenged Khalid bin Sultan to single combat. Zayed wounded Khalid mortally and he died on the 14th of that month. He was succeeded by Salim bin Sultan Al Qasimi.
