= Saqr bin Khalid Al Qasimi =

- Sheikh

Ruler of Sharjah
- Reign: 1883–1914
- Predecessor: Salim bin Sultan Al Qasimi
- Successor: Khalid bin Ahmad Al Qasimi
- Died: 1914
- House: Al Qasimi

Sheikh Saqr bin Khalid Al Qasimi (1883–1914) was the Ruler of Sharjah, a Trucial State and now one of the United Arab Emirates, from 1883–1914. He took control over Sharjah in a coup during the absence of his uncle, Salim bin Sultan Al Qasimi, and ruled both Sharjah and, from 1900 until his death in 1914, Ras Al Khaimah.

== Accession ==
Saqr bin Khalid was left in charge of Sharjah when his unpopular uncle, Salim bin Sultan Al Qasimi, travelled to Ras Al Khaimah and he took the opportunity to seize power over the town. He was quickly supported by the Rulers of Ras Al Khaimah, Umm Al Qawain, Ajman and Dubai. Having cemented his position, he conferred a pension on the former Ruler, Salim bin Sultan Al Qasimi, which guaranteed him an annual payment as well as the retention of his property in Sharjah and the primacy over the island of Abu Musa. There were issues both with Salim's conduct and Saqr's payment of the pension, culminating in a meeting in Ajman taking place in 1884 with the British Resident presiding, where an agreement was reached to restore the pension.

=== Secessions ===
Later that year, Saqr attempted to force the secessionist Sharjah dependency of Hamriyah back into the fold, inviting headman Saif bin Abdulrahman to visit him in Sharjah and simultaneously dispatching Saif's brother, Mohammed bin Abdulrahman, to take over Hamriyah. The next day, Saif returned to Hamriyah and expelled his brother with the greatest of ease.

Another attempt at secession took place, this time in Ras Al Khaimah, and Saqr bin Khalid assisted his cousin Humaid bin Abdullah Al Qasimi, in December 1885, to re-take the village of Sha'am to the North of Ras Al Khaimah. The village was then prevailed upon to pay a fine of 1,600 Marie Therese Dollars.

The former Ruler of Sharjah, Salim bin Sultan, continued to plot against Saqr, effecting an unsuccessful landing at Ajman in 1886 and again trying to gain support from Dubai to usurp Saqr in 1888, in which he was also unsuccessful. Organising an attack against Sharjah the following year, Salim was unable to carry it out and eventually was reconciled to Saqr, becoming his wazir (advisor).

=== Retaking Ras Al Khaimah ===
On 2 August 1900, Sheikh Humaid bin Abdullah of Ras Al Khaimah was paralysed by a stroke and Saqr moved, unopposed, to declare his rule over the emirate. He first placed his cousin and then, after a few months, his son Khalid as wali, or governor, over Ras Al Khaimah.

Hamriyah continued to struggle for confirmation of its independence from Sharjah and, on the occasion of the visit by Lord Curzon in 1903, tried to gain recognition from the British as a Trucial State. This attempt was unsuccessful and was followed by a murderous jostle for the succession as headman of the town following the death of Saif bin Abdulrahman.

Saqr was not a popular ruler and in 1904 managed to survive yet another attempt to unseat him by his Uncle, Salim bin Sultan. However, he ruled Sharjah for a further ten years until his death in 1914.

Salim bin Sultan became wali of Ras Al Khaimah in 1910 and although Saqr remained nominally the Ruler of the emirate, Salim consolidated his hold on power and was in all but name independent.
