= Dhaid Fort =

Fort in Sharjah, United Arab Emirates

- Near Dhaid in Sharjah, United Arab Emirates
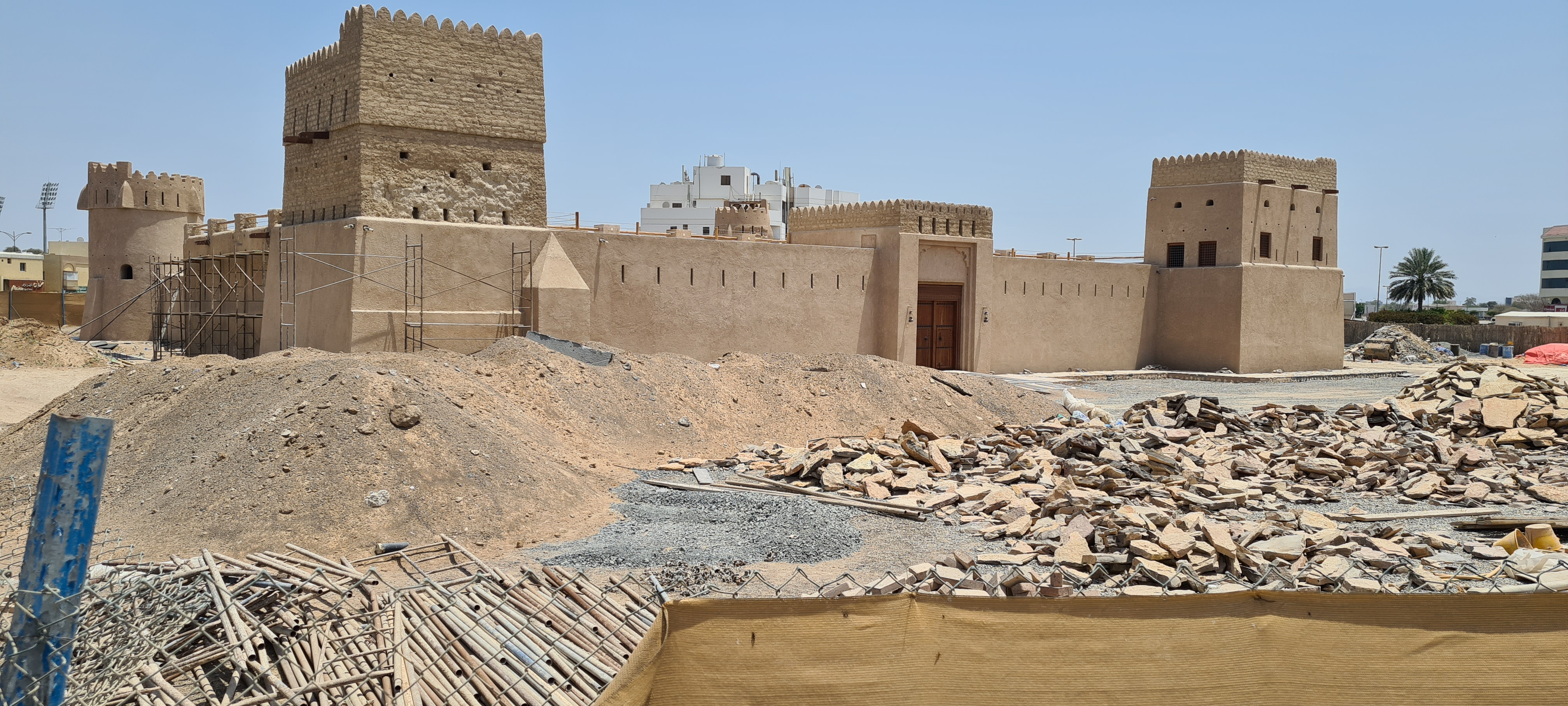

Site information
- Condition: Restored

Location
- Coordinates: 25°17′N 55°53′E

Site history
- Built: 1750
- Materials: Rock, mudbrick

Dhaid Fort, (Also known as Al Hisn Dhaid) is a restored C18th fortification in the city of Dhaid, Sharjah, in the United Arab Emirates.

It was an important interior stronghold for the Ruling families of Sharjah and Ras Al Khaimah and a key strategic asset in maintaining a historical Qawasim dominance of the inland areas of the Northern Emirates.

== Heritage ==
The reconstruction of the ruined fort took place between 2017 and 2021 and was undertaken on the orders of the Ruler of Sharjah and noted historian, Sheikh Dr Sultan bin Muhammed Al Qasimi. The original fortification dates back to 1750. The reconstruction of the fort and surrounding area involved the demolition of a number of illegal buildings, including labour accommodation. The reconstructed fort was intended to form the centre of a new heritage area in the city, including a public square, the restoration of the Al Sharia Mosque, the construction of a folklore market, the Al Sharia Souq, and majlis as well as a wildlife museum.

In July 2024, the Al Sharia Souq, consisting of 16 shops and constructed mainly in wood and palm fronds (Barasti) burned down. The cause of the fire remains unknown. The damaged souq was replaced with a concrete built 60-shop souq.

=== UNESCO ===
Dhaid Fort and the city's extensive oasis formed part of Sharjah's 2018 bid for UNESCO World Heritage Status, under the heading 'Sharjah, Gateway to the Trucial States', which also included the Heart of Sharjah; Sharjah Fort; the former barracks of the Trucial Oman Scouts in Mirgab; Al Mahatta Fort, the first airport in the Gulf; the coastal town of Khor Fakkan; the oasis and settlement of Wadi Helo and Fili Fort, all following the Heart of Sharjah theme of a return to the simplicity and natural lifestyles of the late 1950s.

== History ==
The largest inland city in the Emirate of Sharjah and also the oldest, the fertile oasis of Dhaid has long occupied a strategic location in the mouth of the important Wadi Siji. The city has been a centre of human habitation since the Neolithic and is located in an important crossroads between the Hajar Mountains, Jiri Plain and desert of Sharjah. The fort reflects the strategic importance of Dhaid as a Qawasim stronghold. The city was traditionally dominated by the Tanaij, Bani Qitab and Khawatir Bedouin tribes.

Dhaid Fort was a key element in the 1920s power struggle between the deposed Ruler of Sharjah, Sheikh Khalid bin Ahmad Al Qasimi and the Ruler, Sheikh Sultan bin Saqr Al Qasimi. Traditionally held on behalf of the Ruler of Sharjah by a Wali, Dhaid was a source of significant revenue (generating some 228 Maria Theresa Dollars annually in water rates, let alone the substantial revenues from dates and other agriculture in the area). An agreement was made between the two men that ceded Dhaid to Khalid bin Ahmad, but the fort was held by Bedouin loyal to Sultan bin Saqr. An agreement was made between the Al Qasimi Ruler of Ras Al Khaimah and the Sheikhs of two Bedouin tribes, the Bani Ka'ab and Na'im, that Dhaid would be held by Ras Al Khaimah on Khalid bin Ahmad's behalf, although the arrangement was never put fully in place, Khalid bin Ahmad taking possession of the fort and oasis in July 1928. By 1937, Khalid bin Ahmad was ruler of Dhaid, Kalba and Khor Fakkan.

The unusual structure of Dhaid Fort was noted by historian JG Lorimer in his 1915 survey and gazetteer of the region, in which he records a town of some 140 houses dominated by the "four-towered Al Qasimi fort, featuring two round and two square towers."
