= Dhaid =

Dhaid ٱلذَّيْد Al-Dhaid

- Location within United Arab Emirates Location within Middle East Location within Asia
- Coordinates: 25°17′N 55°53′E
- Country: United Arab Emirates
- Emirate: Sharjah

Government
  - Type: Absolute monarchy
  - Sheikh: Sultan bin Muhammad Al-Qasimi

Population (2022)
  - Total: 33,000

Dhaid, or Al Dhaid (Arabic: ٱلذَّيْد, romanized: Adh-Dhayd), is the capital of the Central Region of the Emirate of Sharjah in the United Arab Emirates. An oasis town, it has extensive irrigated date palm plantations with water channelled from the nearby Hajar mountains, at least in part through ancient tunnels dug for that purpose, known as aflāj in Arabic (falaj in the singular).

Dhaid has long occupied a strategic location in the mouth of the important Wadi Siji.

== Geography ==
Dhaid is located on the desert plain to the east of the coastal city of Sharjah, and is bisected by the East/West Road from Sharjah to Masafi in the foothills of the Hajar Mountains. To its north lies the inland oasis town of Umm al-Quwain Emirate, Falaj al-Moalla, while the road south leads to the town of Al Madam on the Dubai-Hatta Road. The Sharjah-Mleiha-Kalba Road passes to the south of the town. Dhaid is an oasis town, fed both by seasonal wadis and by underground aquifers and water sources. It has extensive date palms and other plantations.

== History and prehistory ==
An archaeological site discovered here in 2015 shows evidence of habitation by humans going back hundreds of thousands of years to the Stone Age. In particular, awls for piercing holes in the leather of animal hides, scrapers for cleaning leather, and stone axes were found here.

At the turn of the 20th century, Dhaid consisted of some 140 houses, owned by sections of the Tanaij, Bani Qitab and Khawatir tribes, including larger houses with mud brick towers. It also had a four-towered Al-Qasimi fort, featuring two round and two square towers, Dhaid Fort.

The town was maintained for the Ruler of Sharjah by a walī (وَلِي), who would collect tithes in the form of dates, as well as water rates (paying 228 Maria Theresa thalers in 1906). These revenues became core to a dispute of Al-Qasimi family over Dhaid in the 1920s. Dhaid became the seat of the deposed Ruler of Sharjah, Sheikh Khalid bin Ahmad Al Qasimi when, in June 1927, an agreement was reached between Sultan bin Saqr Al Qasimi and Khalid bin Ahmad to provide for the upkeep of the deposed ruler's family. This ceded the fort at Dhaid and the revenues of the inland oasis town to Khalid bin Ahmad. Dhaid, in 1906, generated some 228 Marie Theresa Dollars annually in water rates, as well as revenue from the sale of dates. Although he had Sultan bin Saqr's agreement, Khalid remained in Umm Al Quwain, and sent some of his men to Dhaid to occupy his newly acquired property, as the Bedouin who had manned the fort for Sultan were still active in the area. With the support of the Sheikhs of the Bedouin tribes of Bani Ka'ab and Na'im, who favoured any scheme which would weaken Sharjah, it was agreed that the ruler of Ras Al Khaimah, Sultan bin Salim Al Qasimi, would possess Dhaid 'on behalf of Khaled bin Ahmad'. This arrangement was not fully supported by Sultan bin Salim himself, who feared antagonising Saqr bin Khalid, and also believed Khalid bin Ahmad would represent an ongoing financial burden with little hope of any return other than conflict. Khalid bin Ahmad finally took full possession of Dhaid in his own right in July 1928.

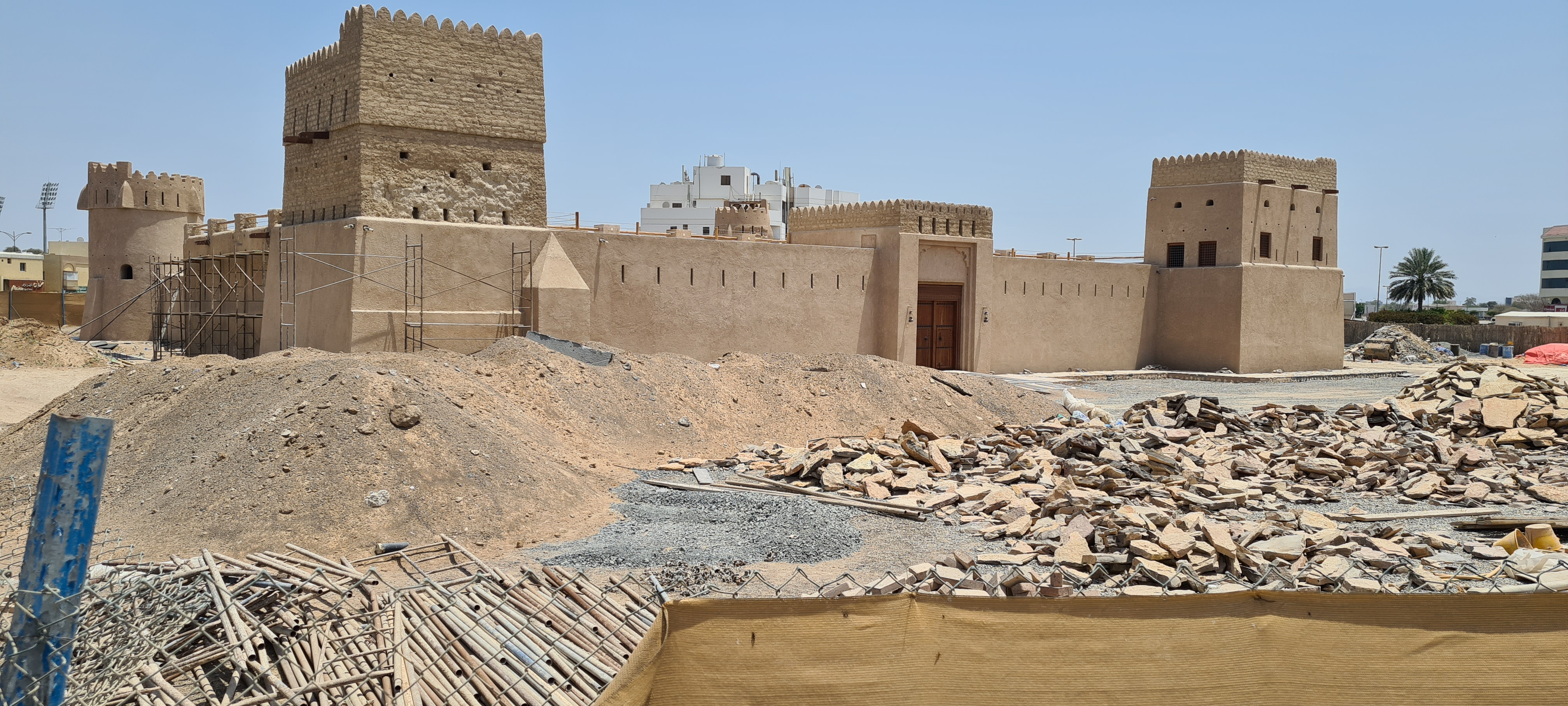
Dhaid Fort

== Important places ==
Jebel Mileiha, some 20 km (12 miles) to the south of Dhaid, is the site of 'Fossil Rock', a popular off-road destination and now home to the Mleiha Archaeological Centre, which displays important archaeological finds from the area dating back 125,000 years, through the Umm Al Nar era to the later Hellenistic period, including 2nd century BCE coins.

== Restrictions ==
Based on the directives of the Sharjah Ruler, Al Dhaid Municipality has confirmed that renting houses to non-citizens within residential neighbourhoods is strictly prohibited.
