= Sharjah Fort =

19th century fort in the UAE

- Al Hisn Sharjah
- Sharjah Fort
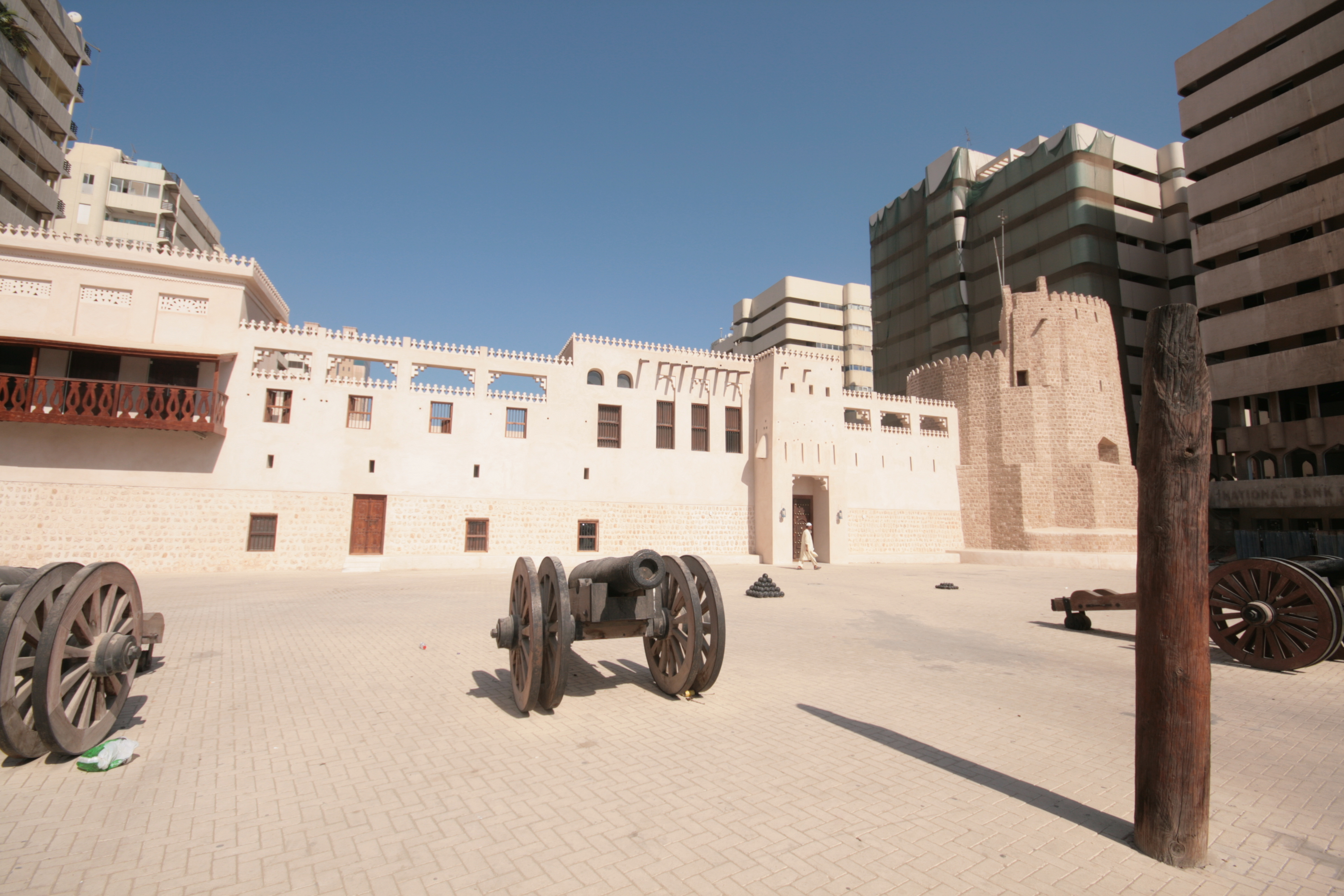
- Sharjah Fort from the front. The pole was used to flog criminals or stake them out as punishment

- Location within United Arab Emirates
- 25°21′31″N 55°23′11″E
- Type: Fortification
- Periods: 1820-Current
- Region: United Arab Emirates

History
- Built: 1820
- Built by: Sheikh Sultan bin Saqr Al Qasimi
- Abandoned: 1970-1996

Site notes
- Management: Sharjah Museums
- Public access: (Currently under renovation: September 2014)

Sharjah Fort (Al Hisn Sharjah) is a double story traditional rock, coral and adobe fortification in the centre of the city of Sharjah in the United Arab Emirates (UAE).

The fort was originally constructed in 1820 by the then Ruler of Sharjah, Sheikh Sultan bin Saqr Al Qasimi, following his accession to the 1820 General Maritime Treaty with the British. It was partially demolished in January 1970, the one remaining tower (called 'Kubs', that to the far right of the fort) lending its name to the square in which it sits, 'Al Burj', Arabic for 'tower'.

The fort has been restored by the current Ruler as part of a comprehensive programme of ongoing restoration of the traditional core of the old port city of Sharjah under the name 'Heart of Sharjah'. The restoration of Sharjah Fort commenced in January 1996 and was completed in April 1997.

== History ==
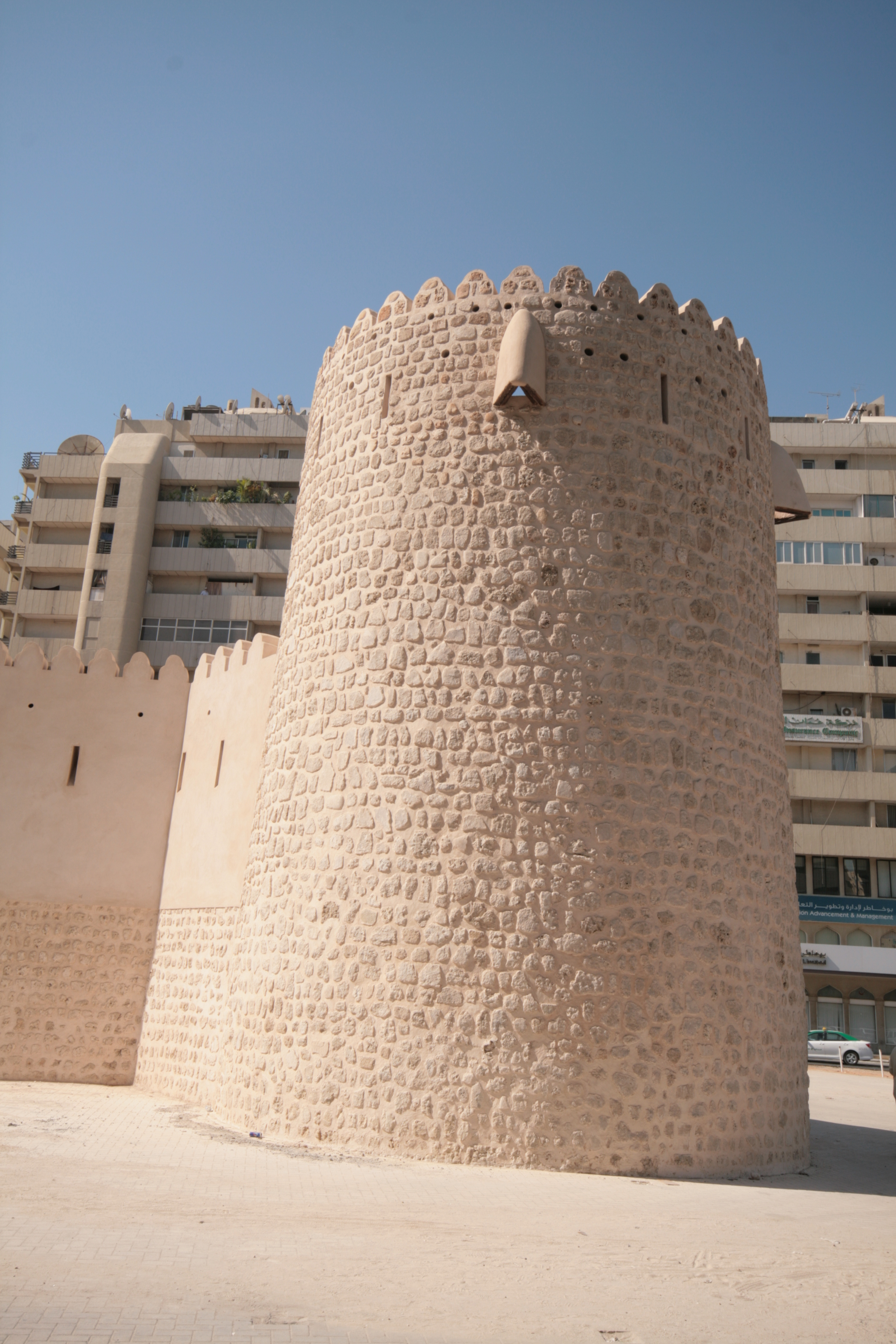
The rearward 'Al Kubs' tower was all that remained after the Fort's demolition in 1970. It has since been faithfully restored by the current Ruler of Sharjah

Early British records of 1830 note Sharjah's fort located, "A little inland, mounting six pieces of cannon, together with some detached towers. In case of alarm from an enemy, it is stockaded round with date trees and wood sufficient for repelling the attack of Arabs although of little service against regular troops."

The demolition of the fort took place in January 1970, when Sheikh Khalid bin Muhammad Al Qasimi wished to remove all trace of Sheikh Saqr bin Sultan Al Qasimi, the previous Ruler. Told of the demolition while studying in Cairo, the current Ruler of Sharjah, Sheikh Sultan bin Muhammad Al-Qasimi rushed home in an attempt to halt the move. Arriving too late to save most of the fort, he nevertheless persuaded his brother to cease the demolition. All that remained was a single tower called 'Kubs' but which would become known locally as the 'Burj'.

Taking notes of the line of the remaining foundation and saving various fittings from the demolition site, Sheikh Sultan was able to restore the fort almost 20 years later with the original doors and windows saved from the demolished fort.

Saqr bin Sultan – the man whose memory the demolition of the fort was intended to erase – returned to Sharjah in 1972 in an abortive coup attempt in which Sheikh Khalid bin Muhammad was killed.

== Gallery ==
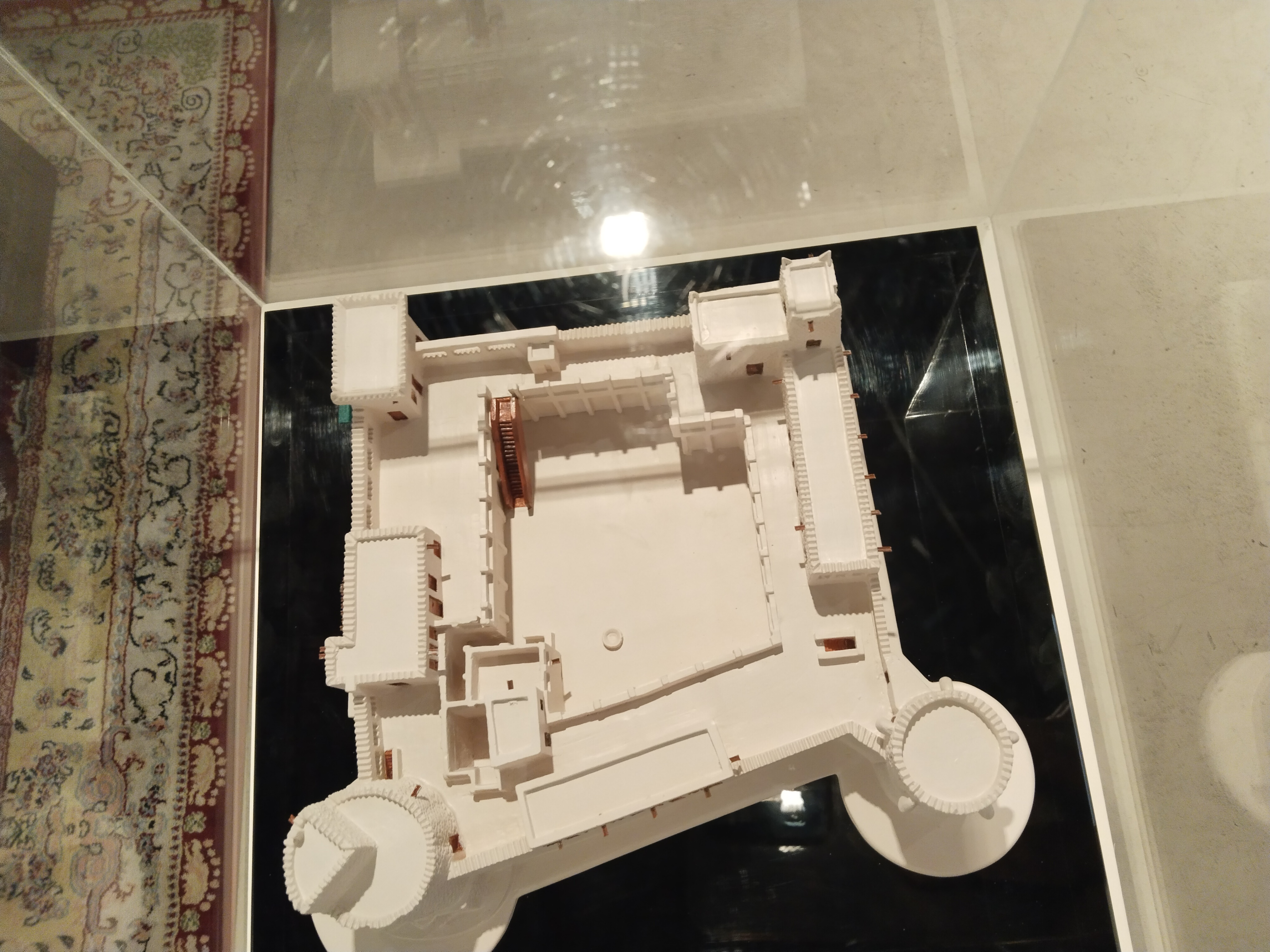

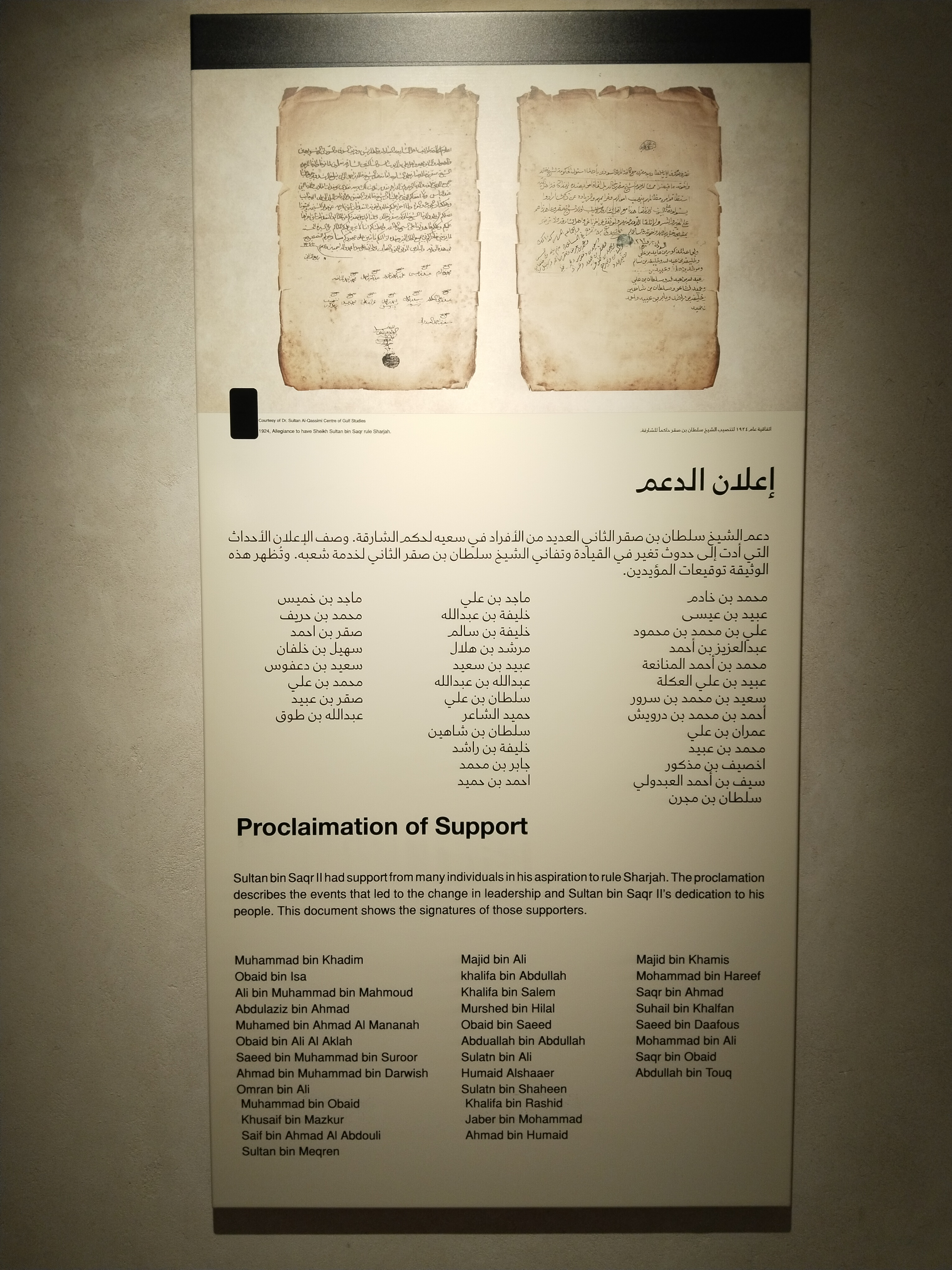

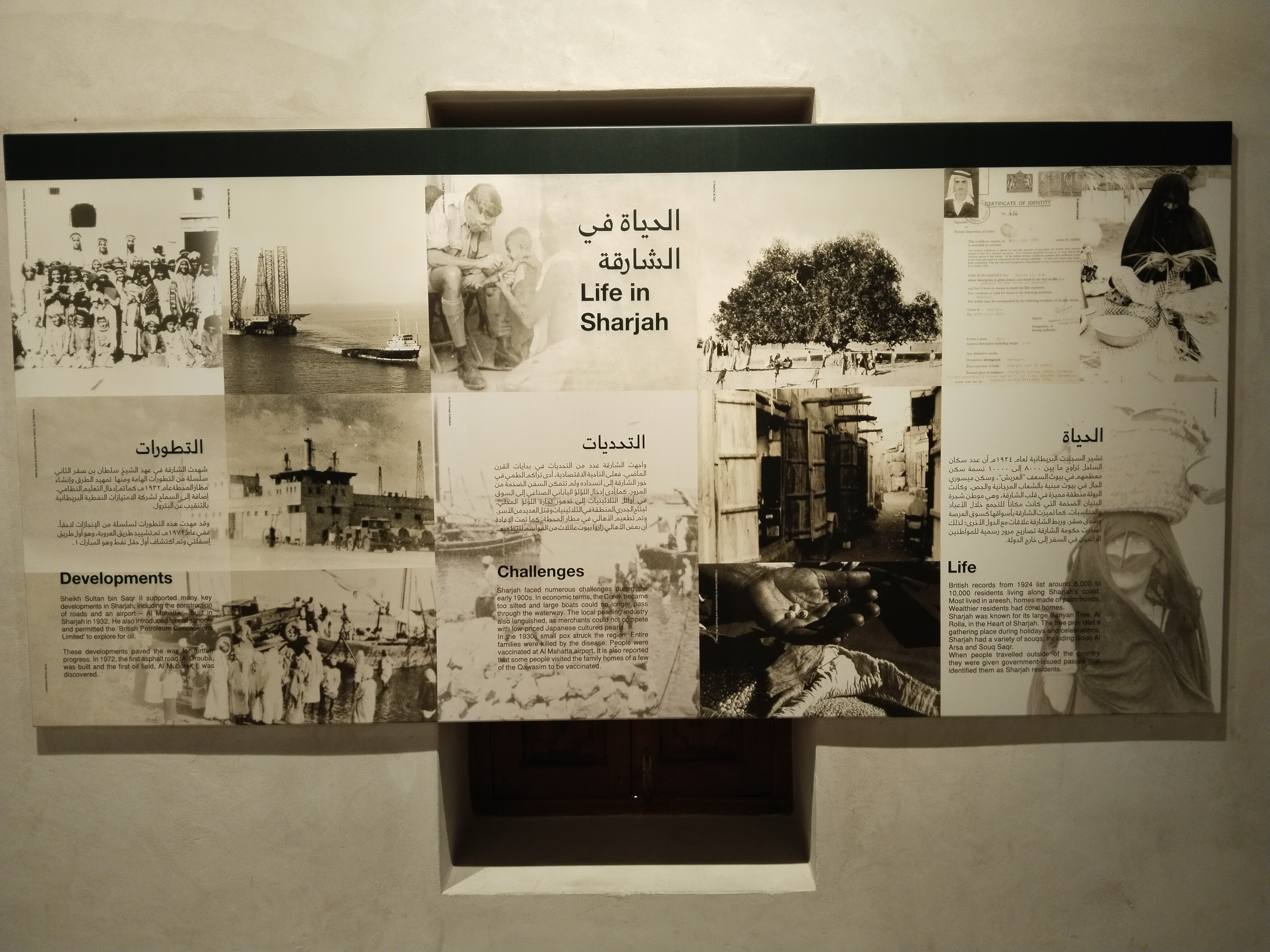

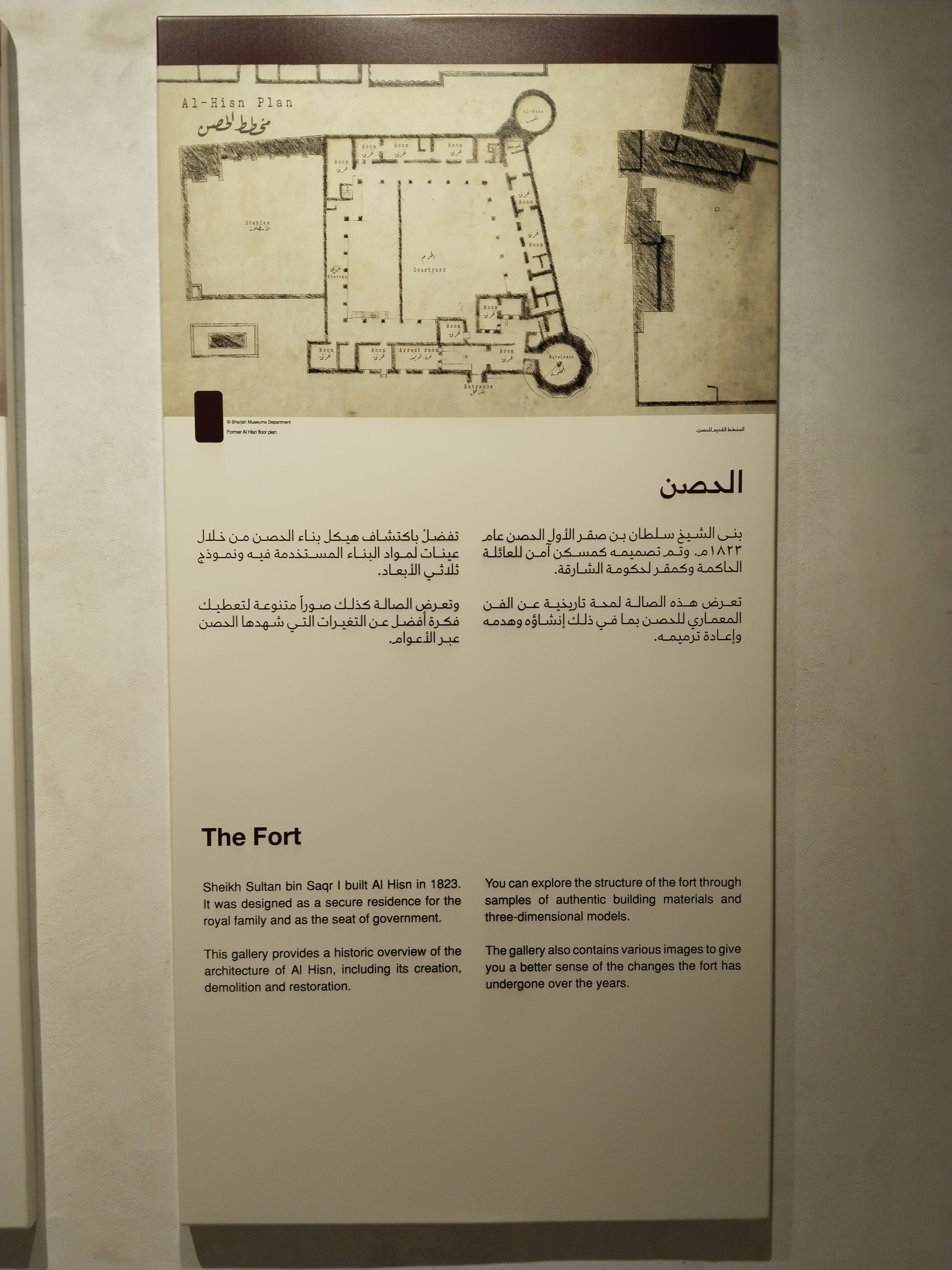

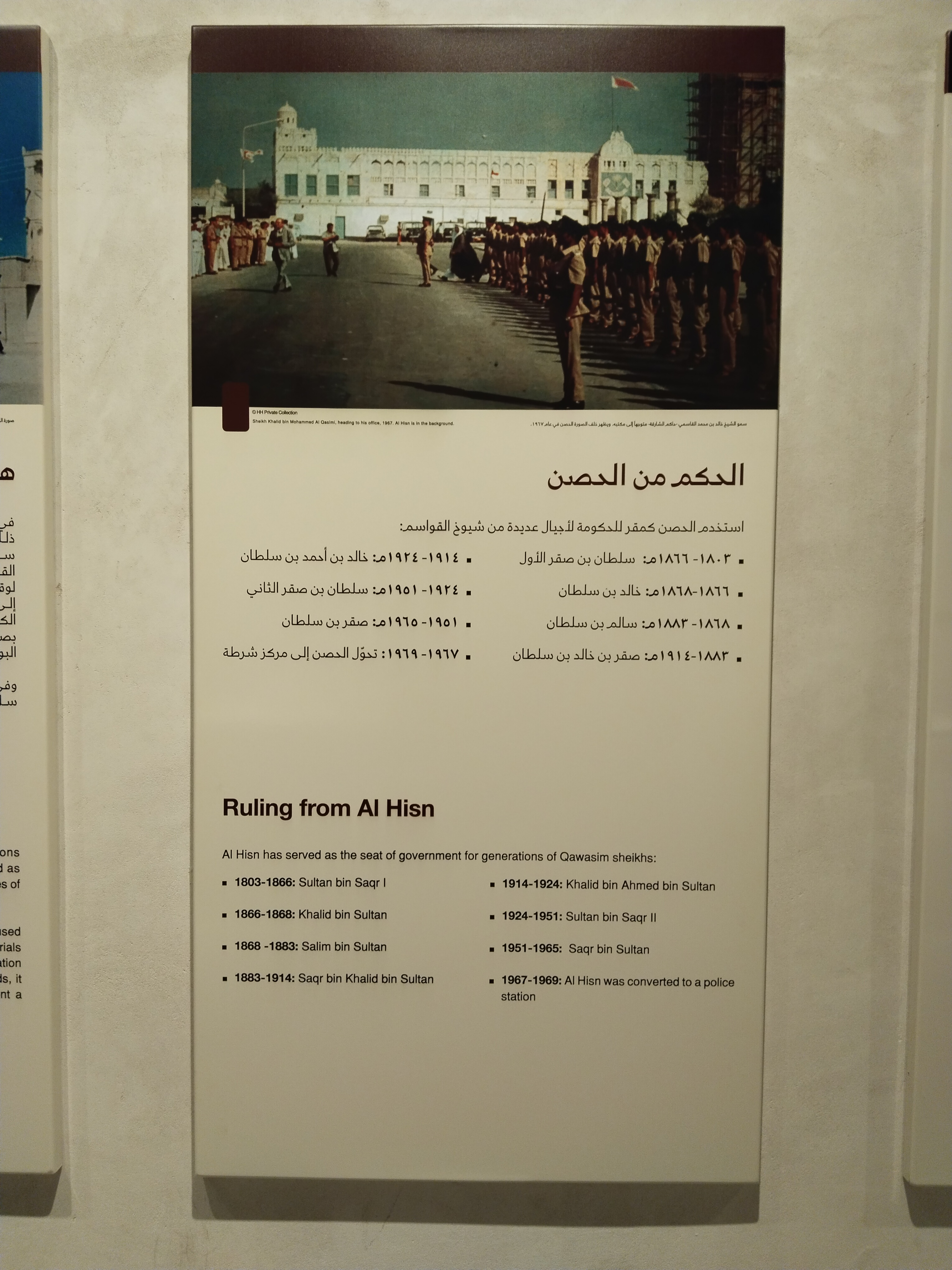

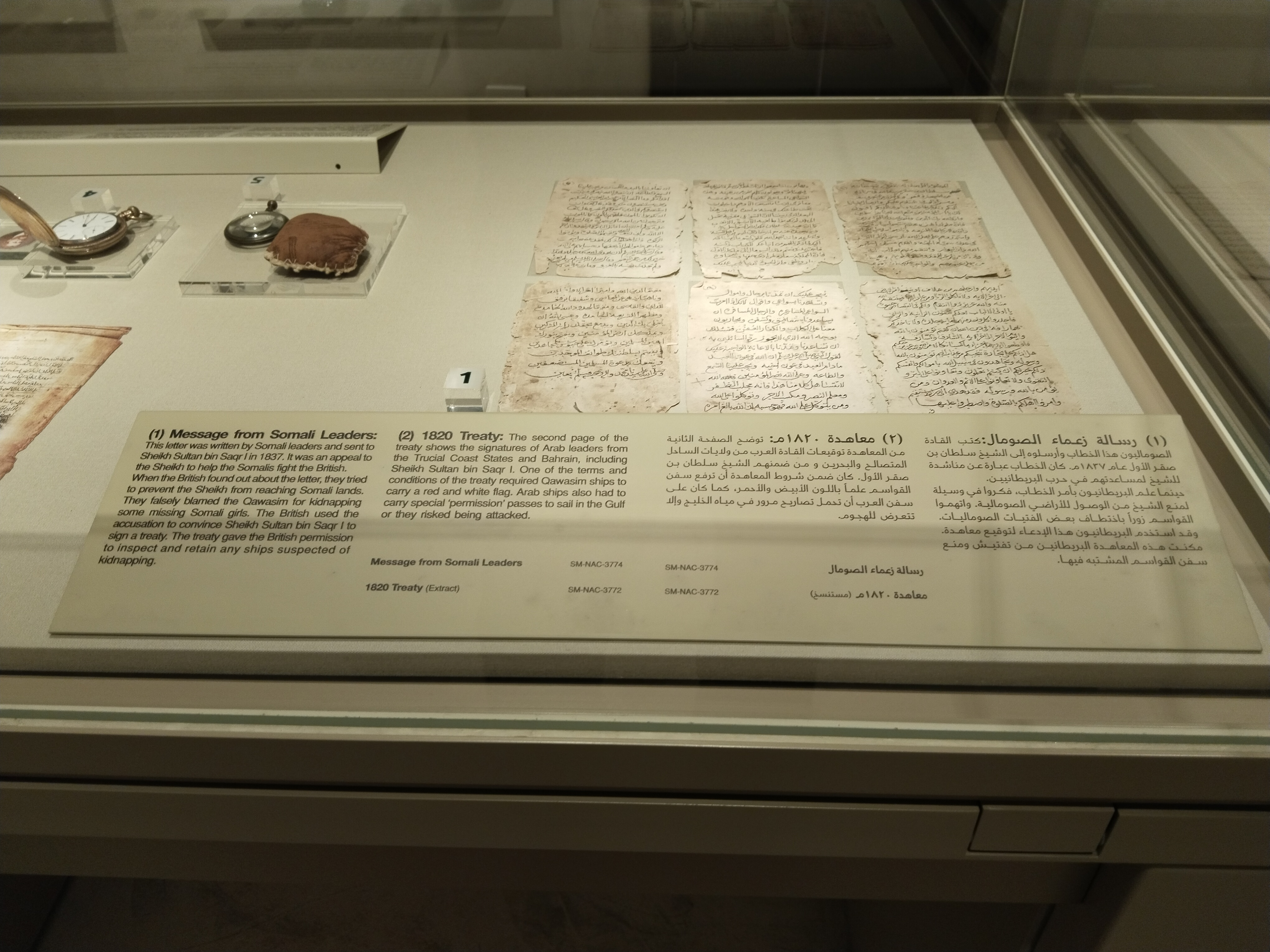

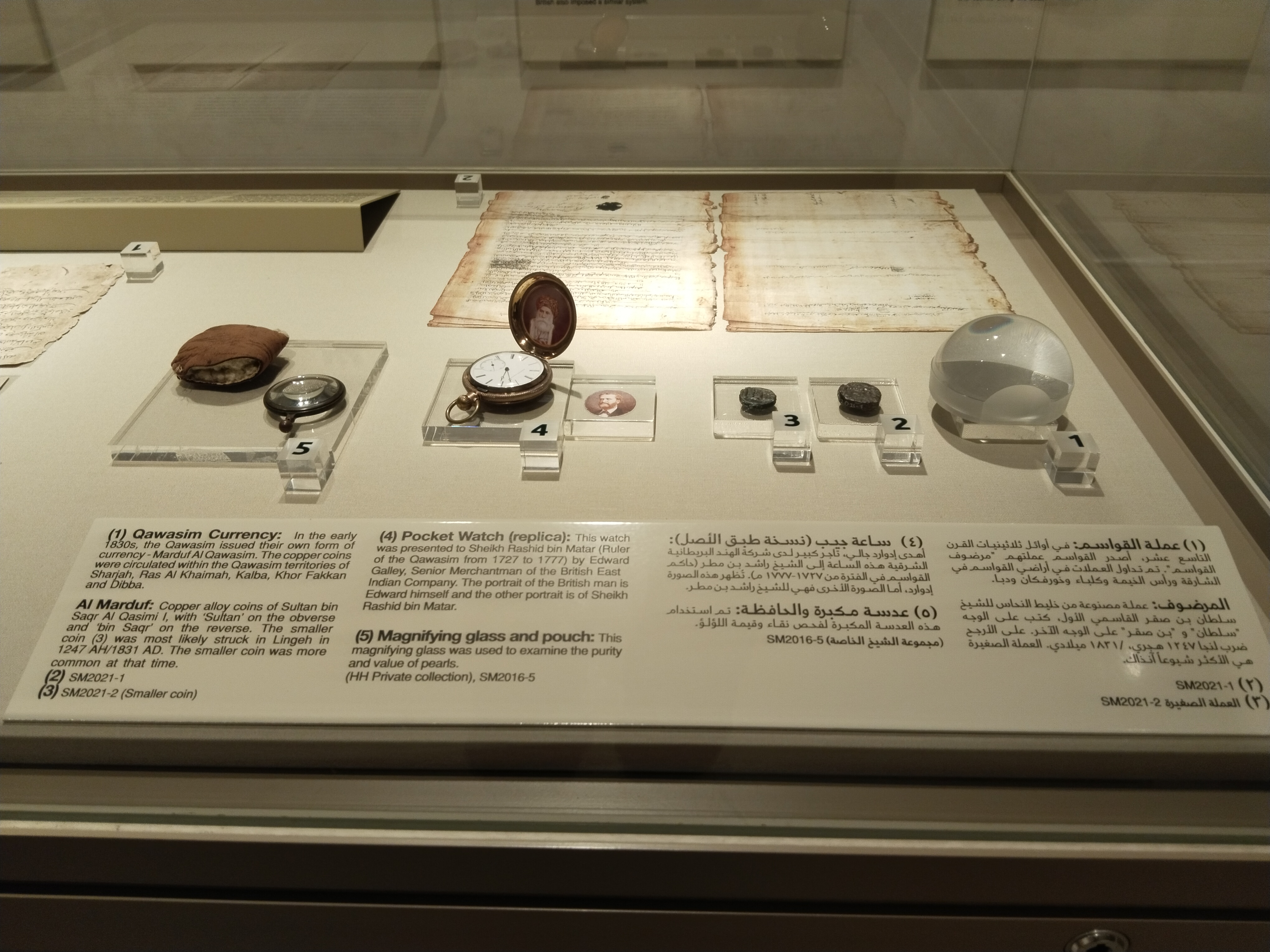

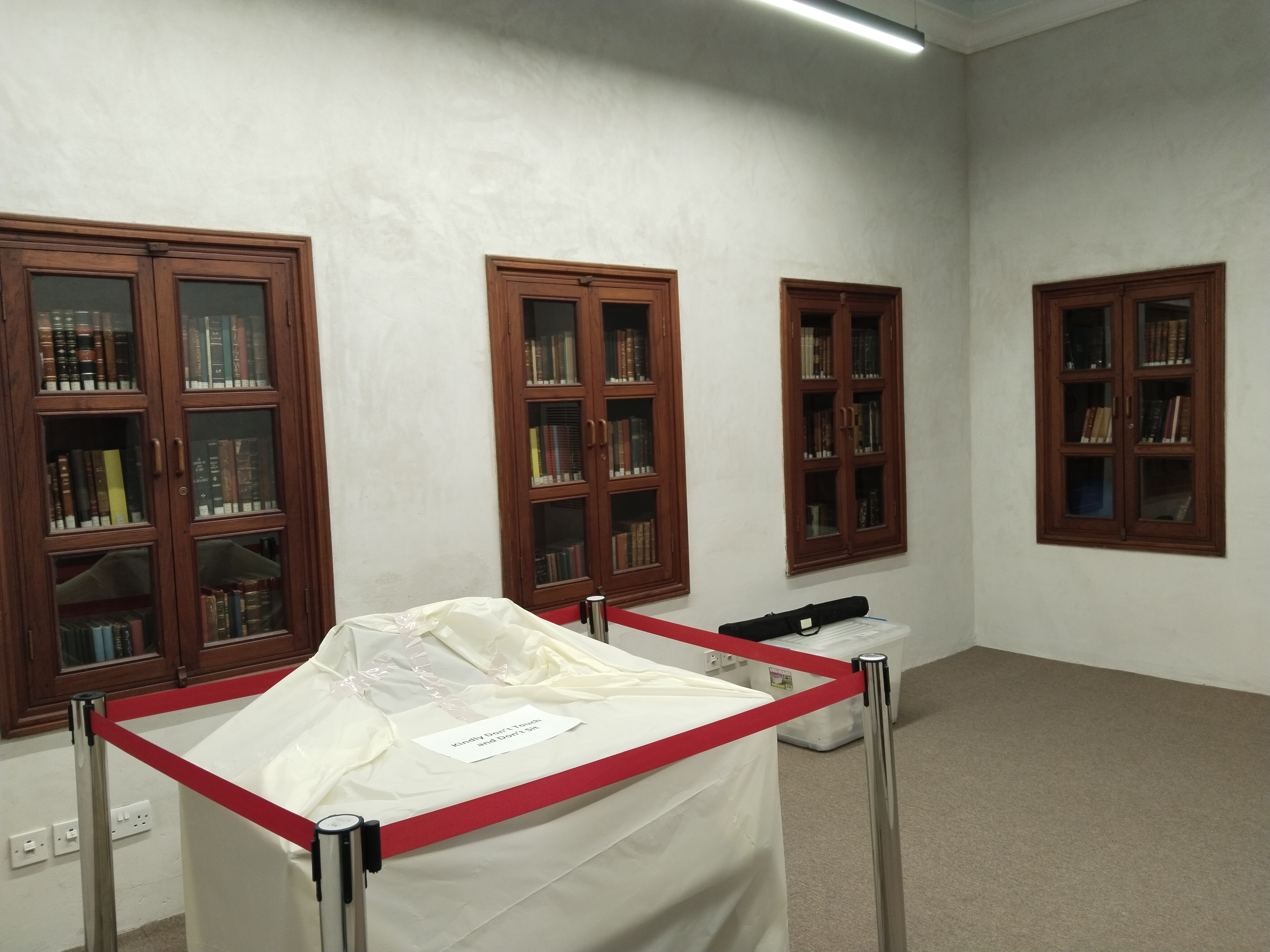

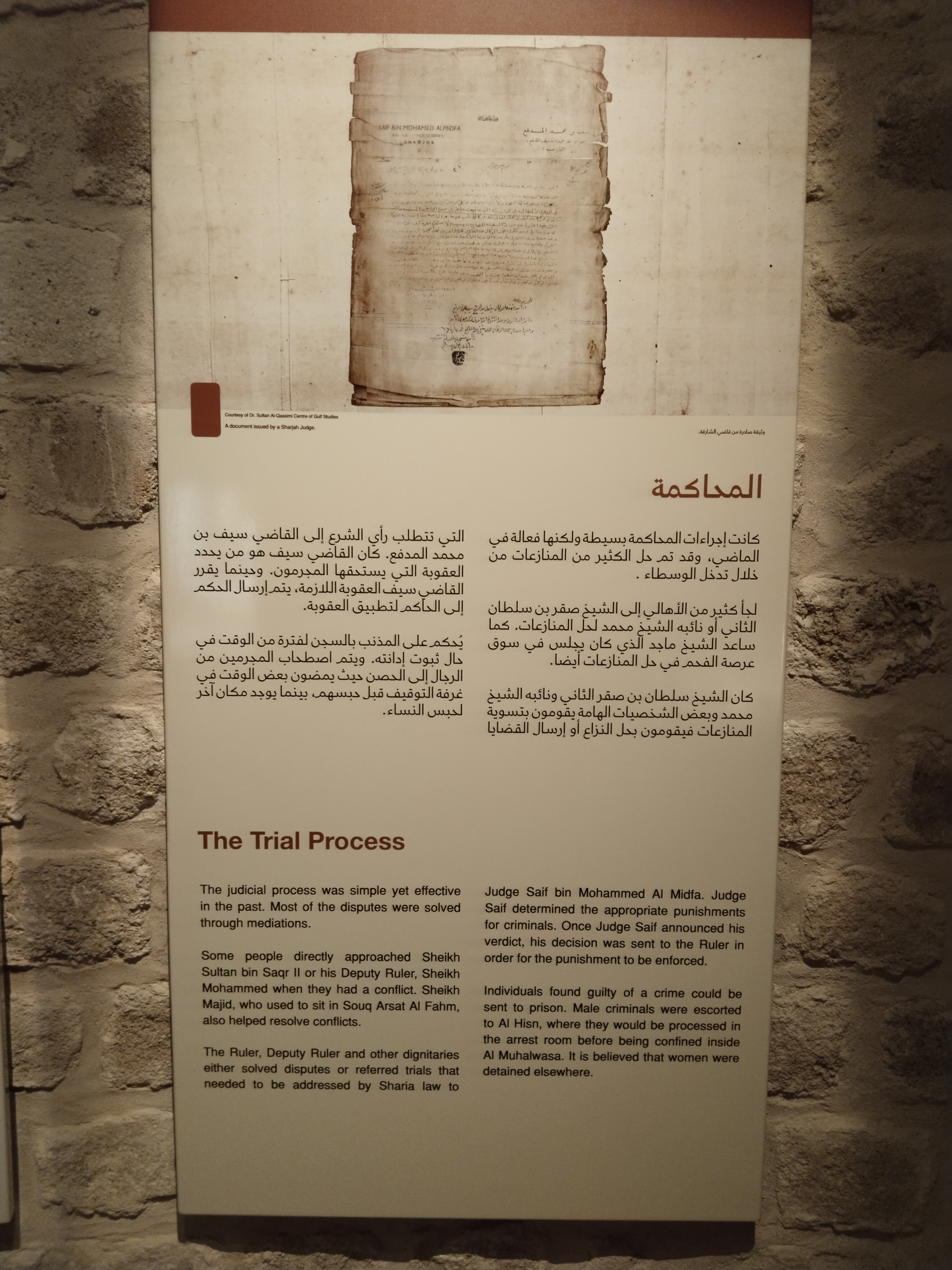

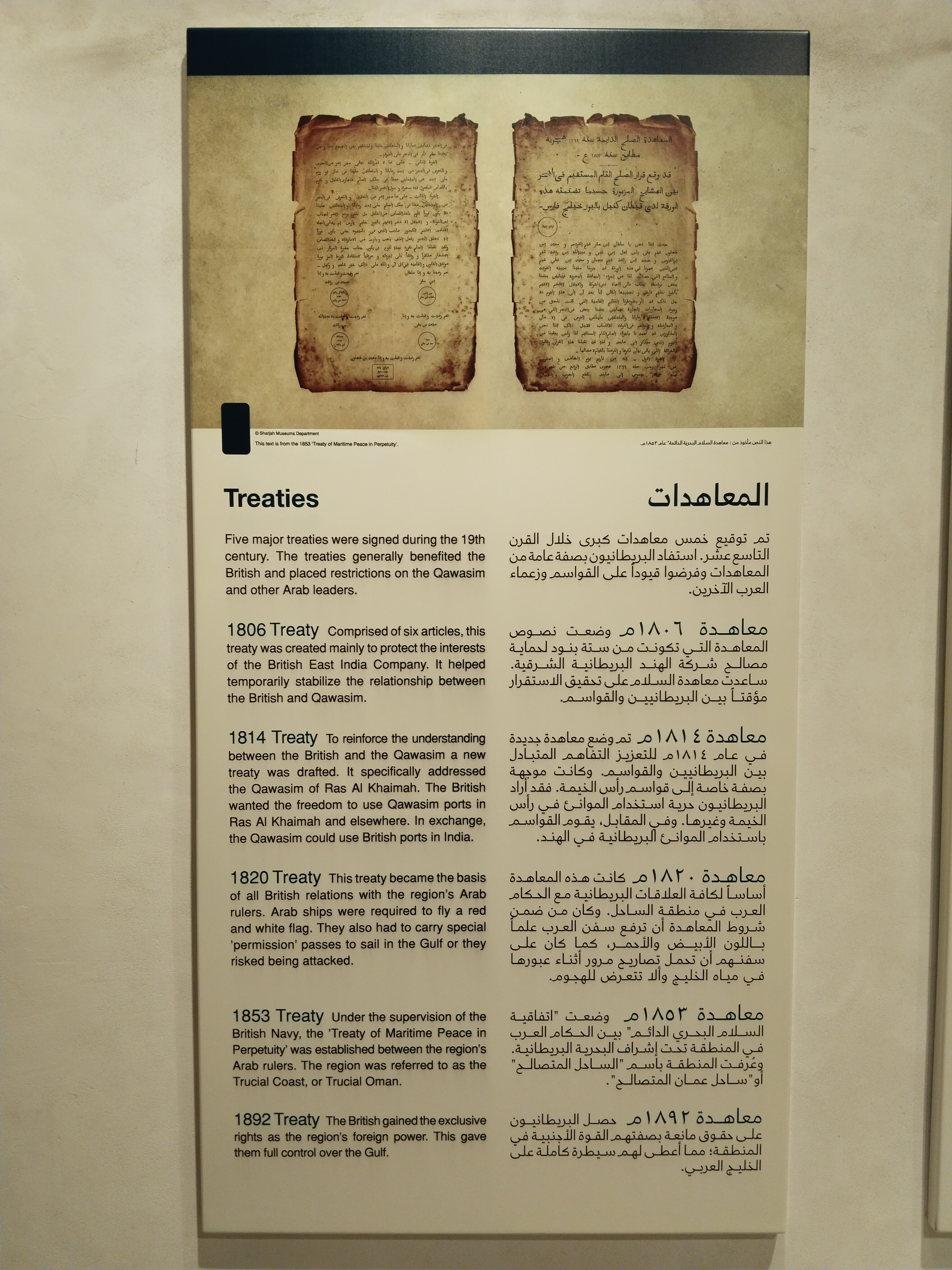

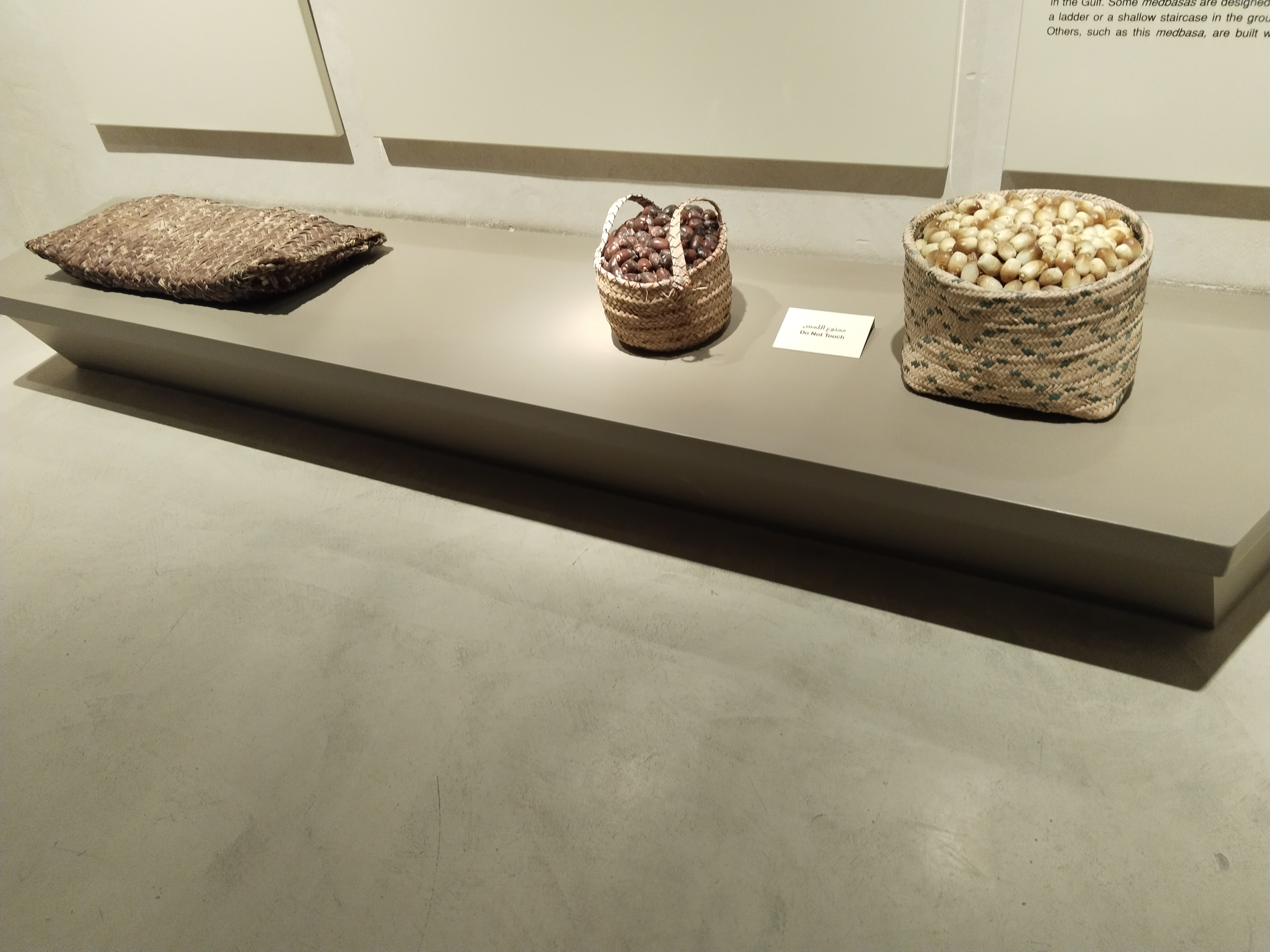

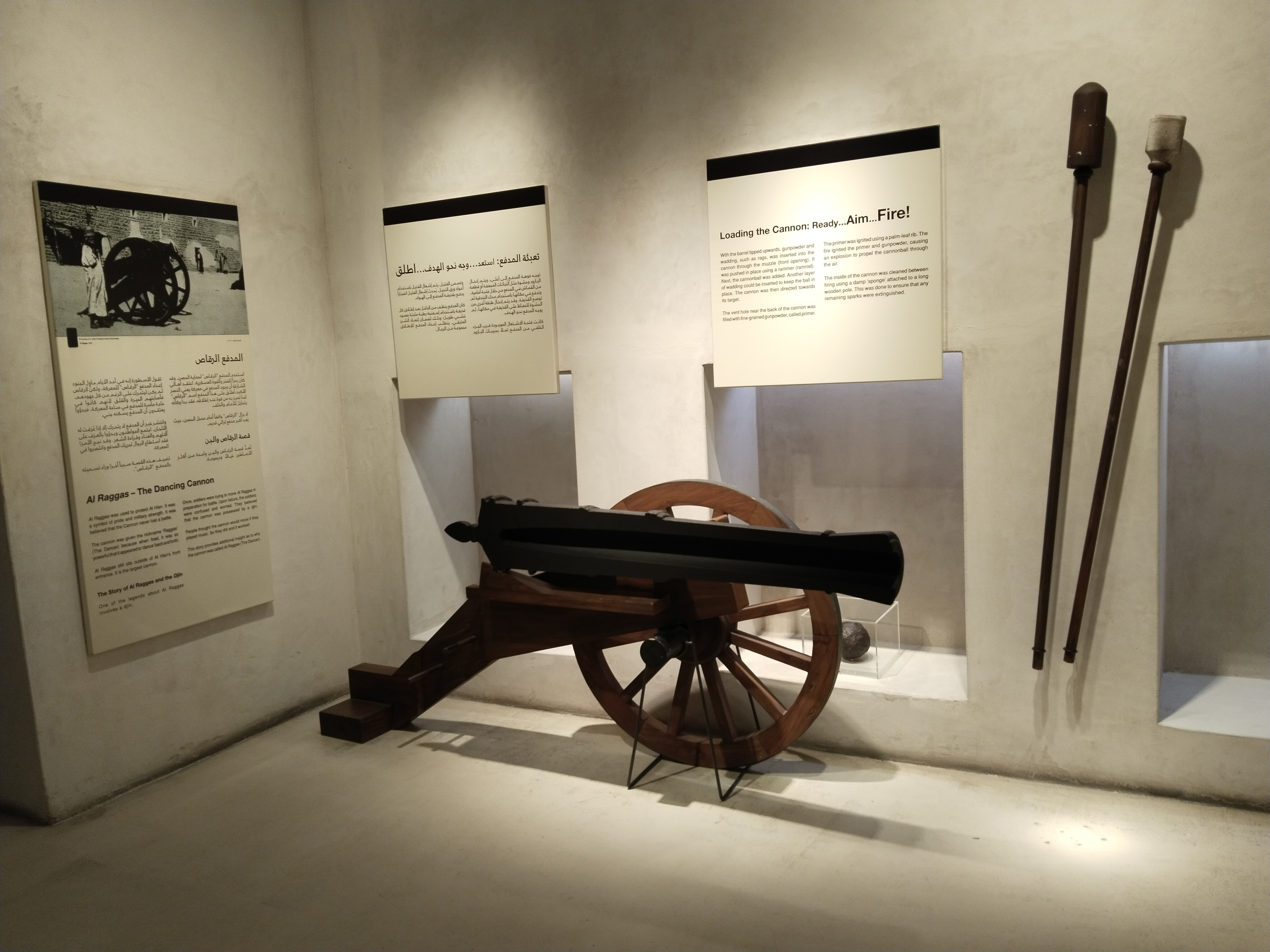

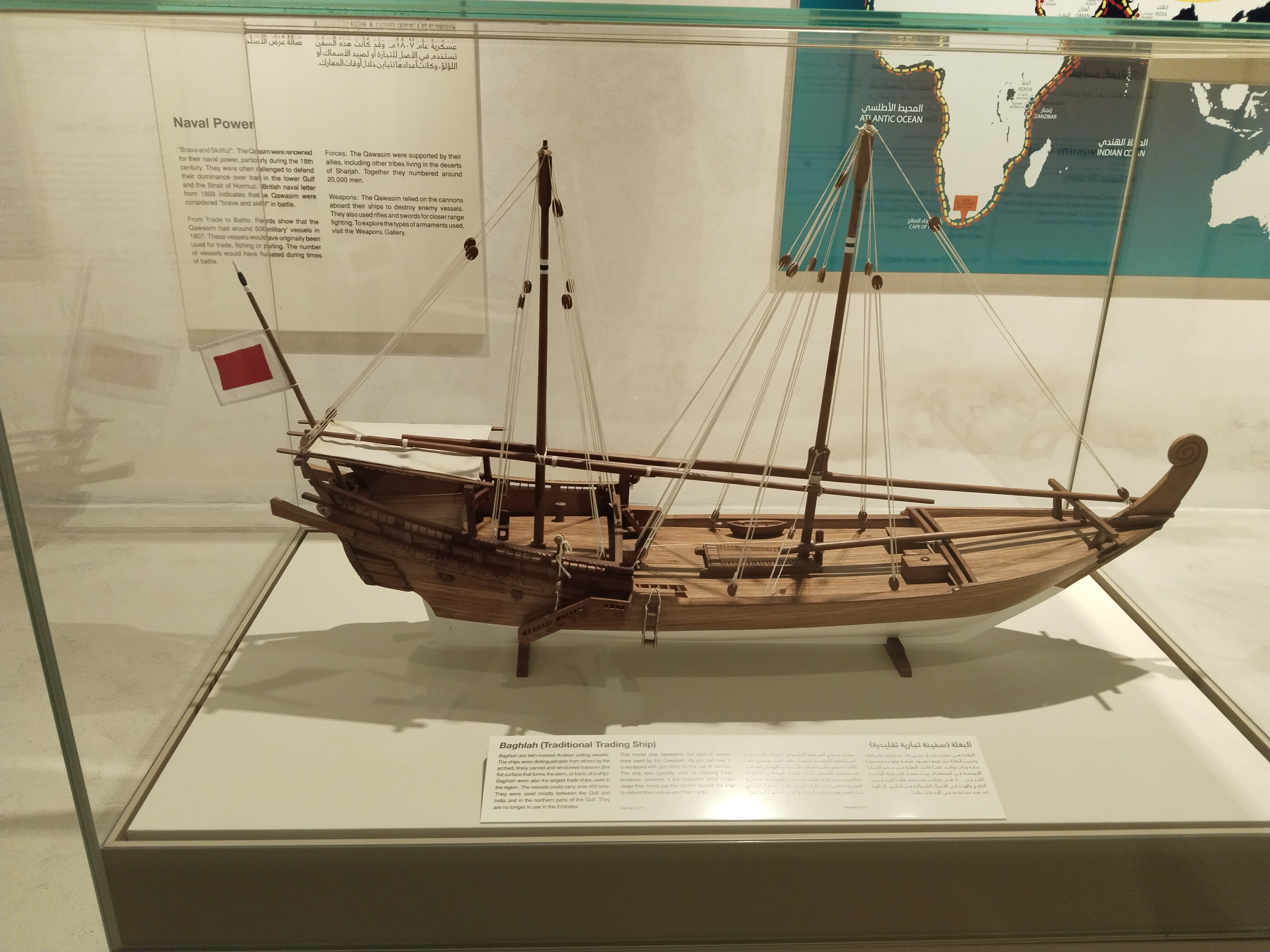

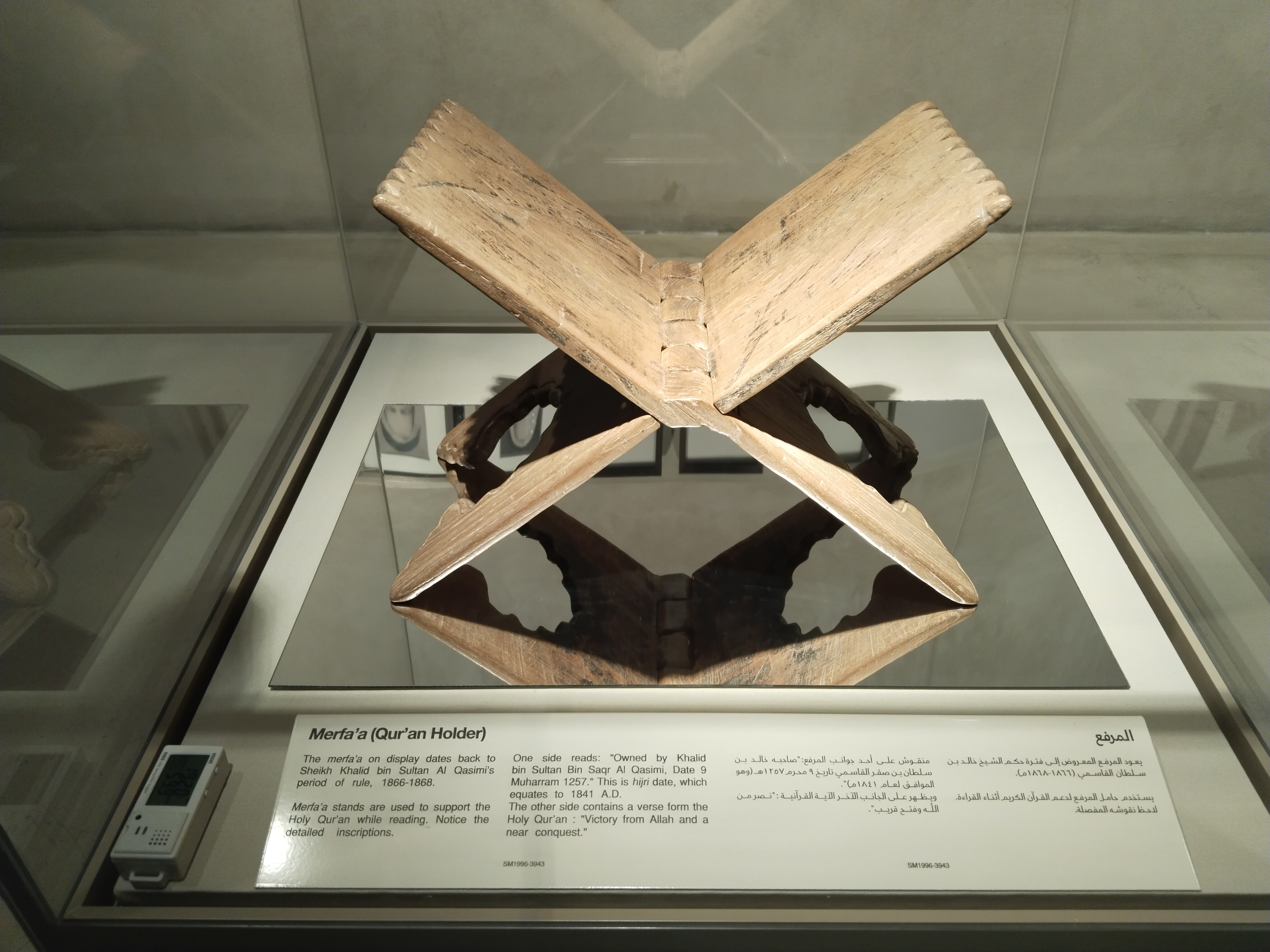

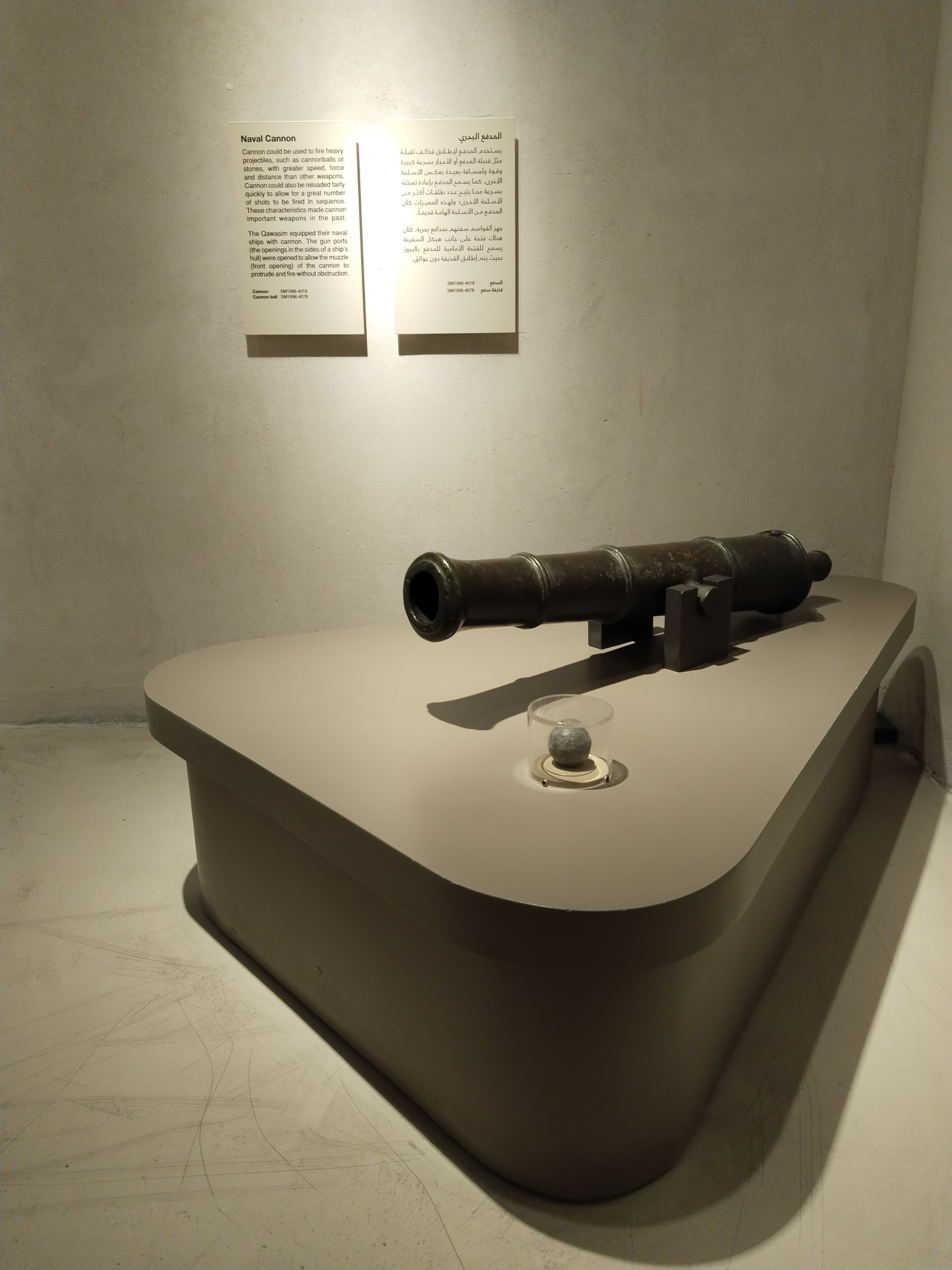

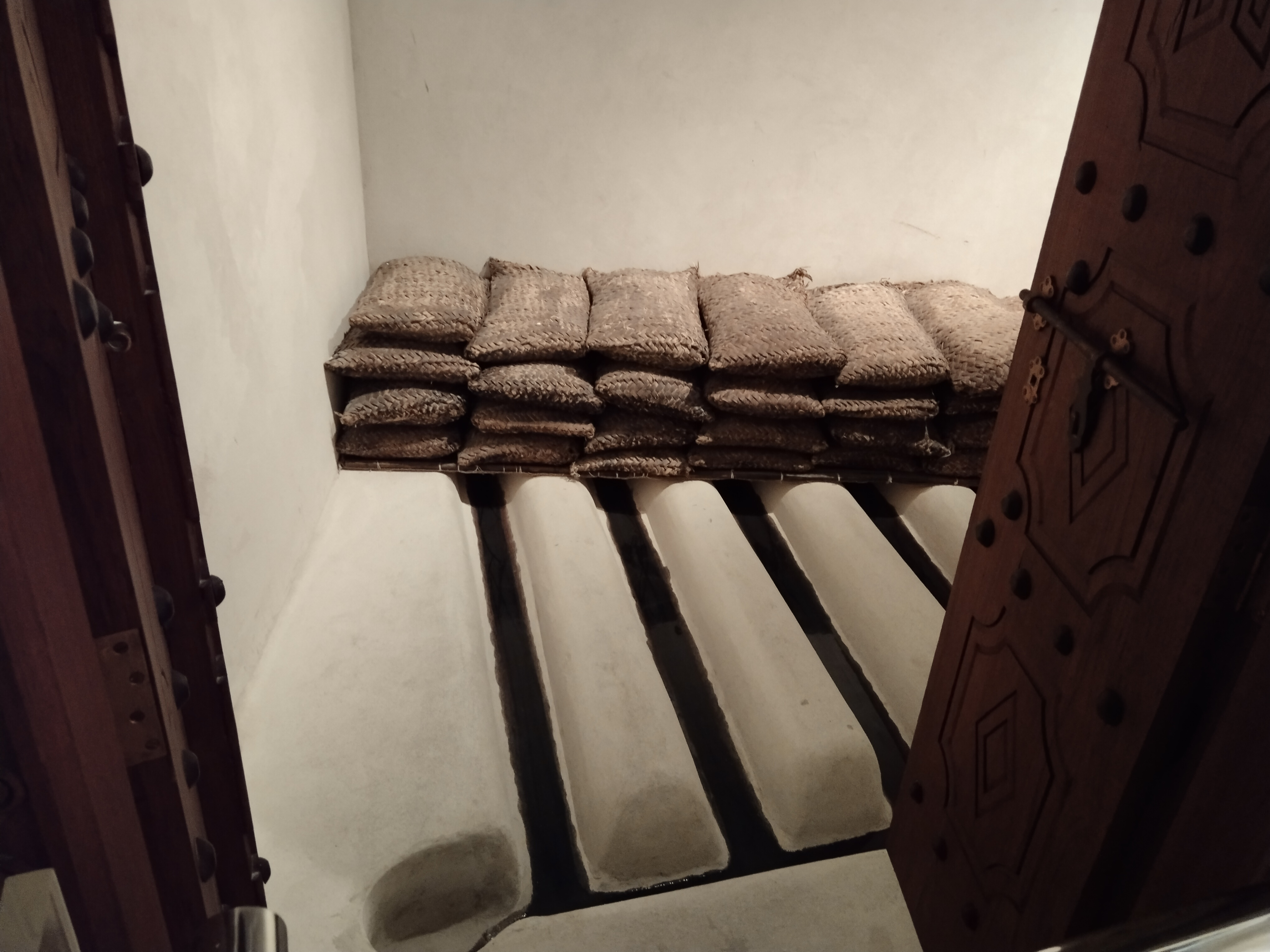

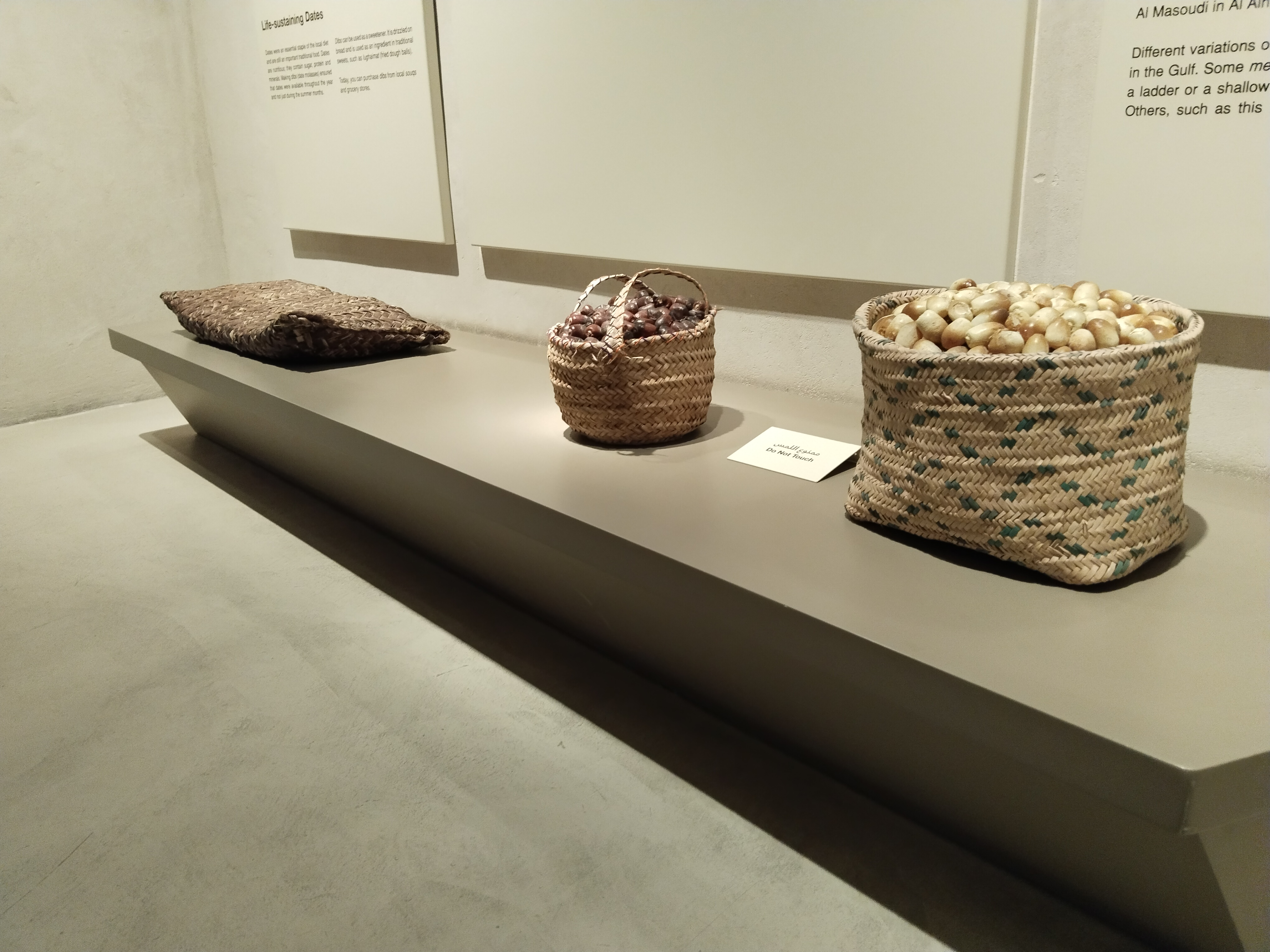

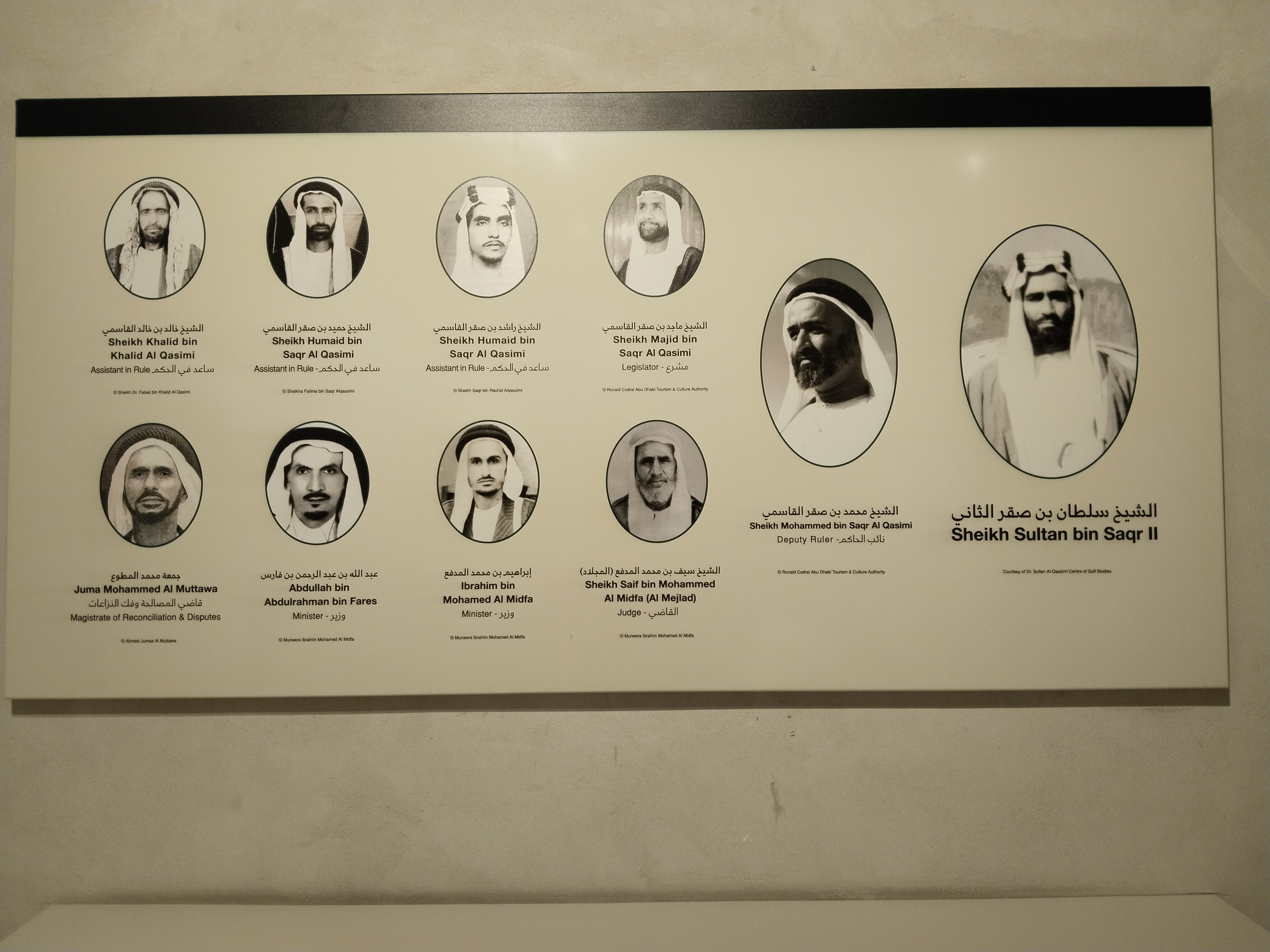

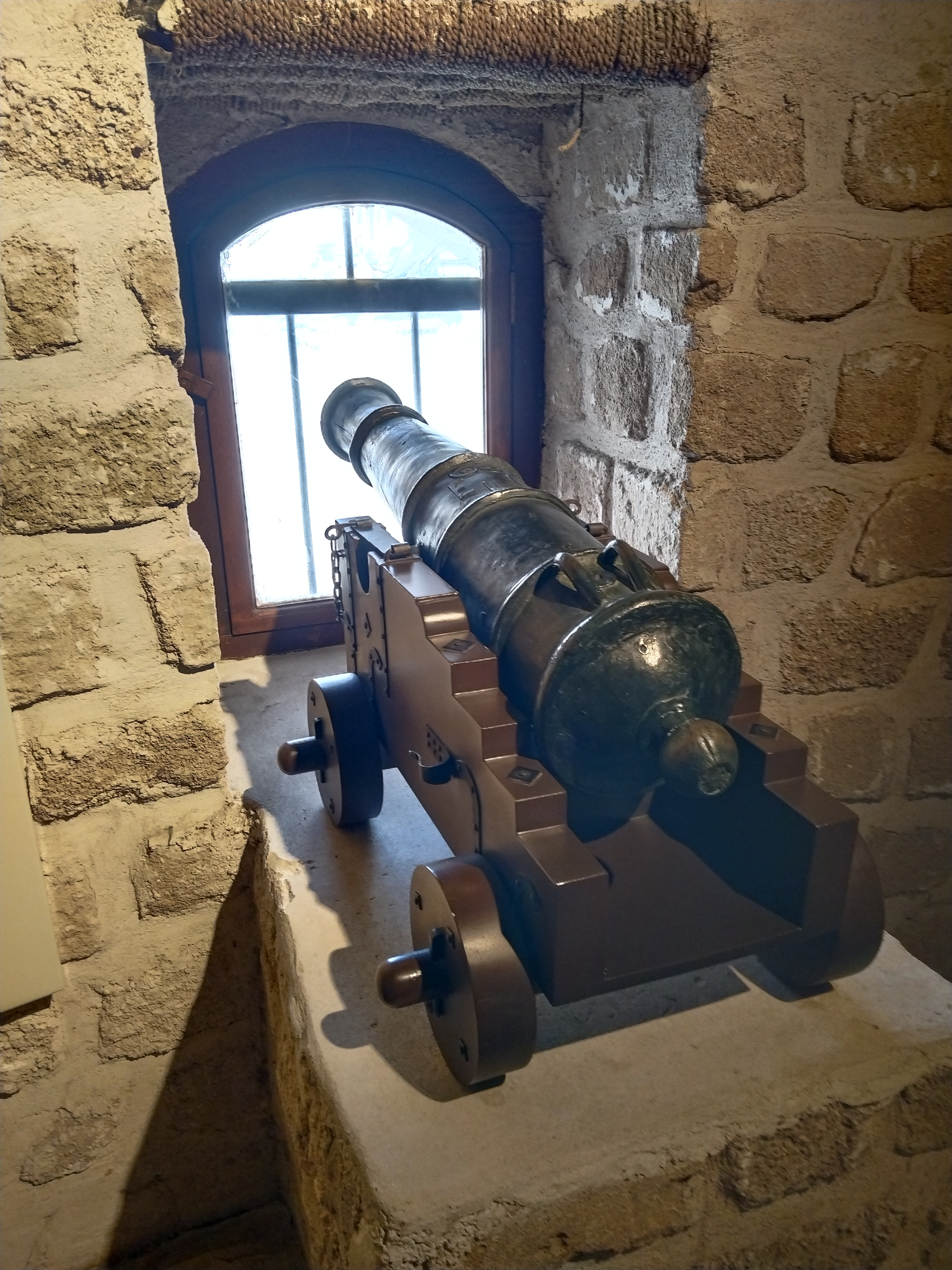

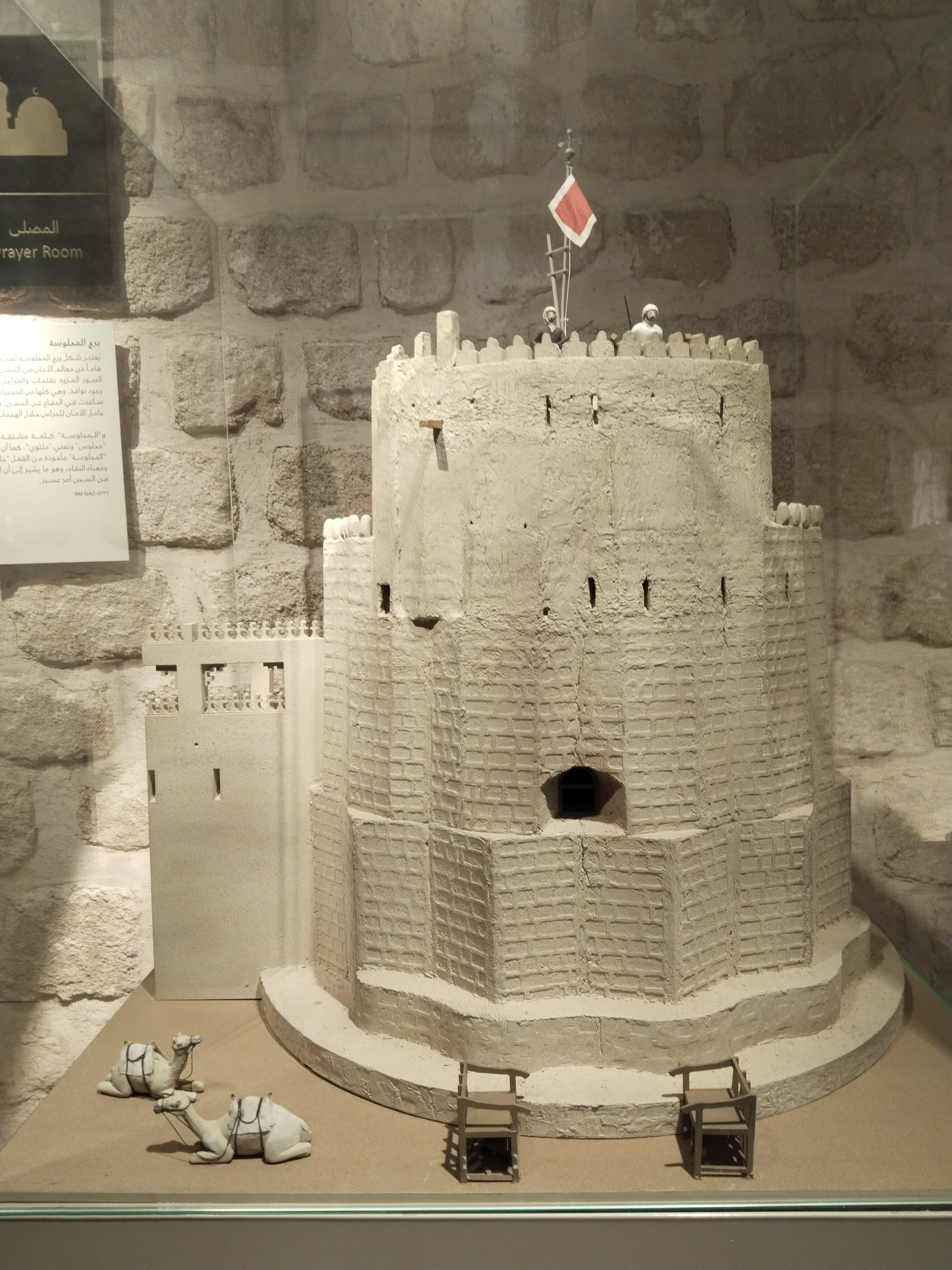

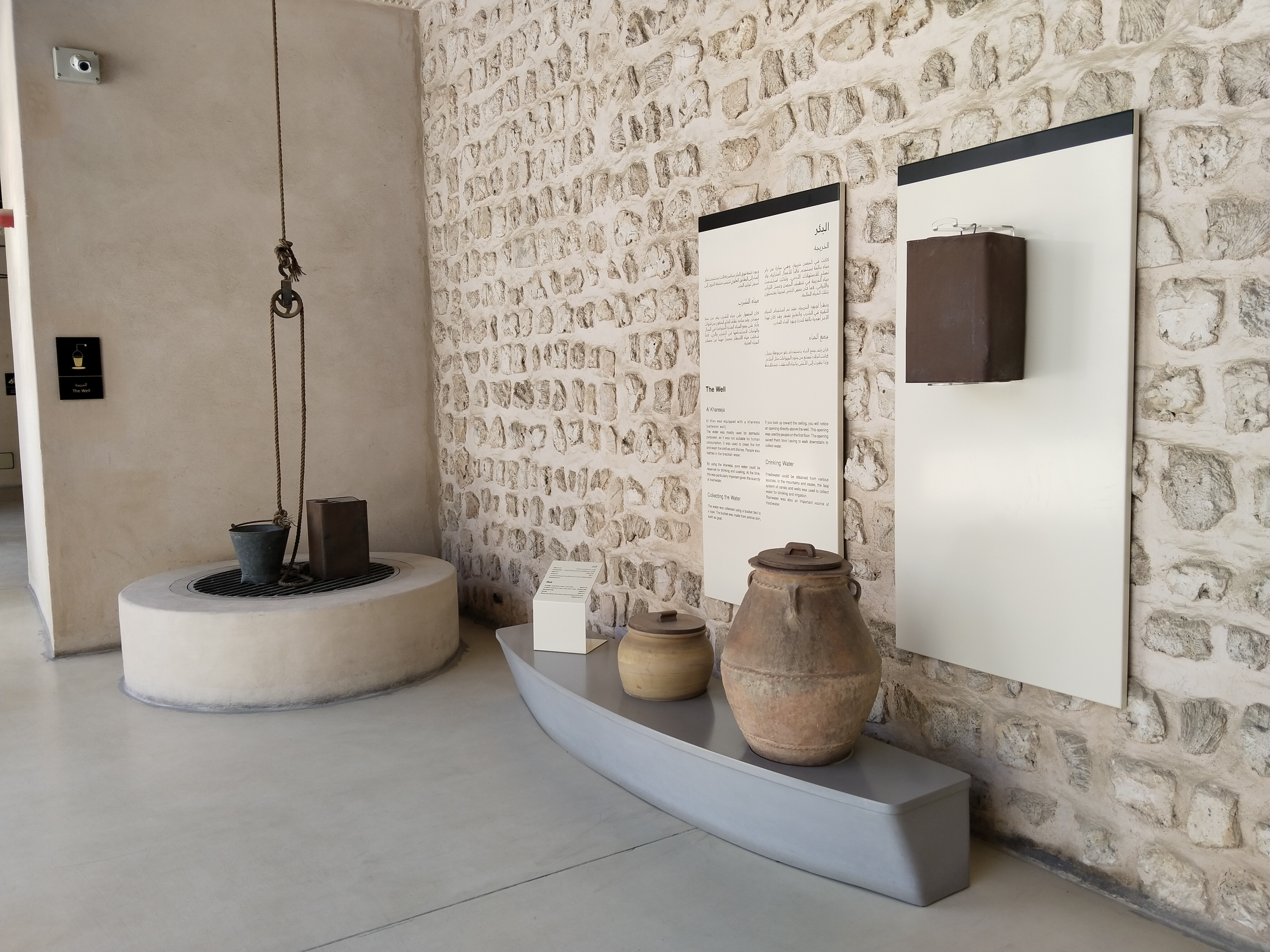

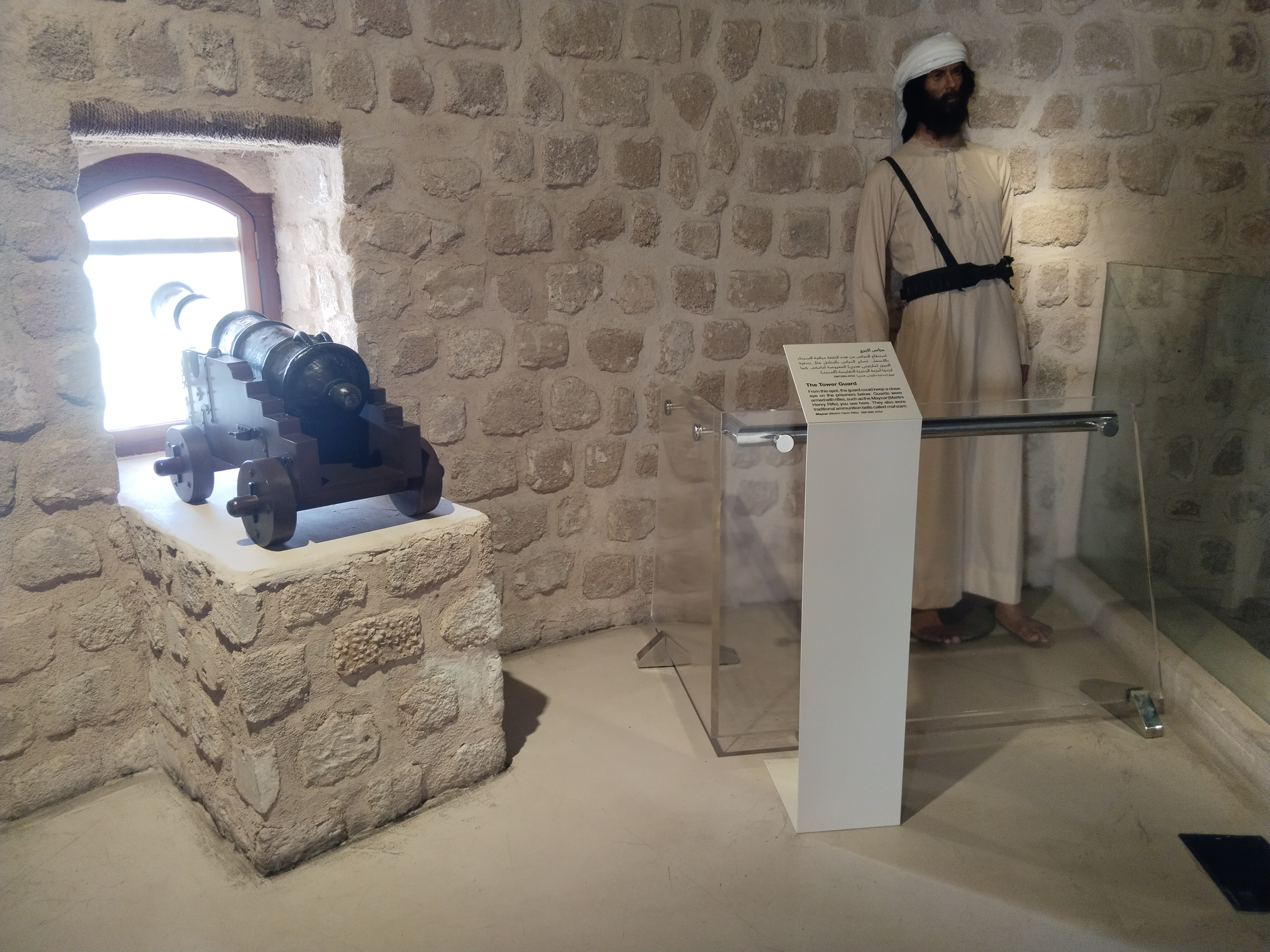

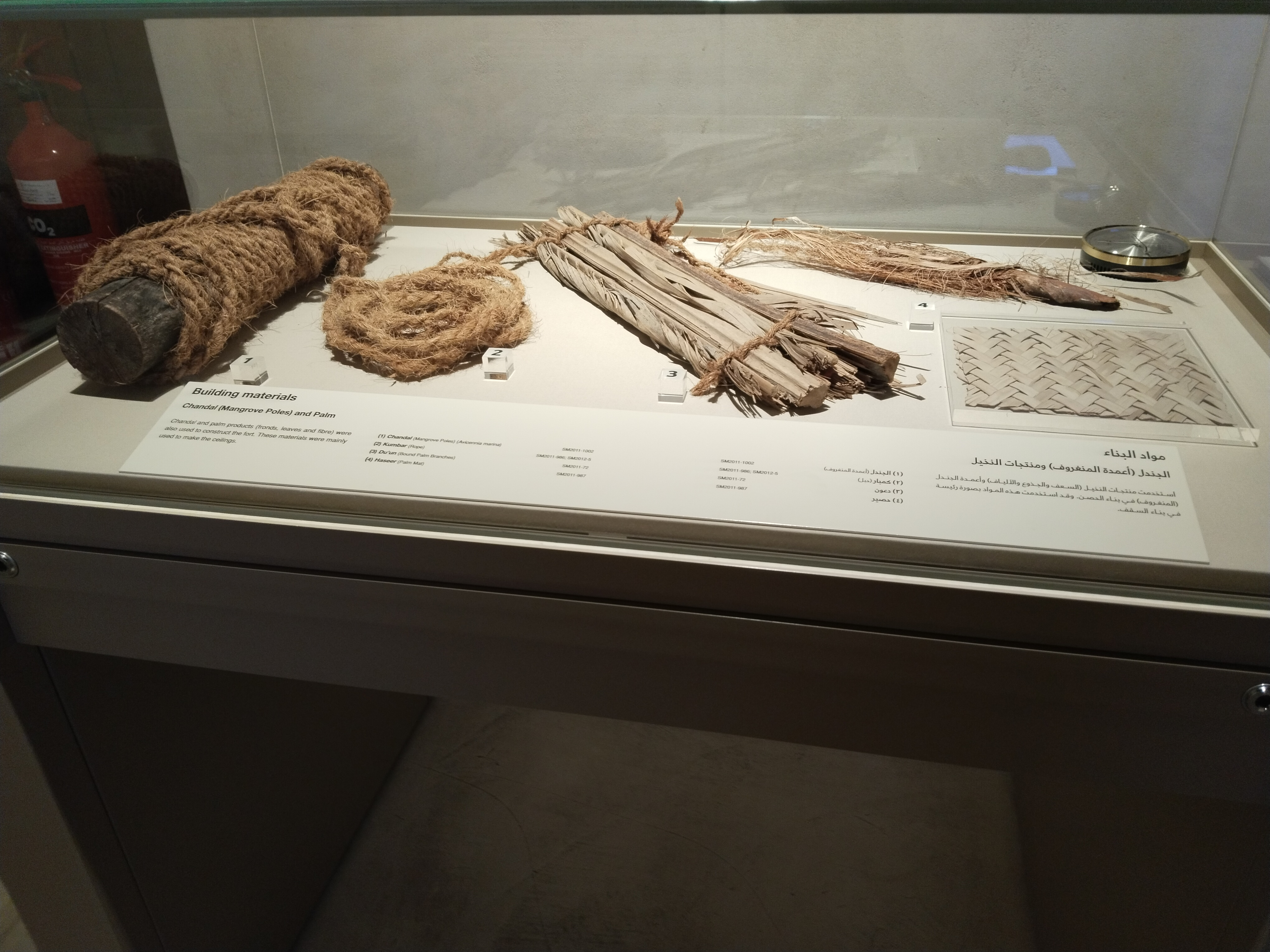

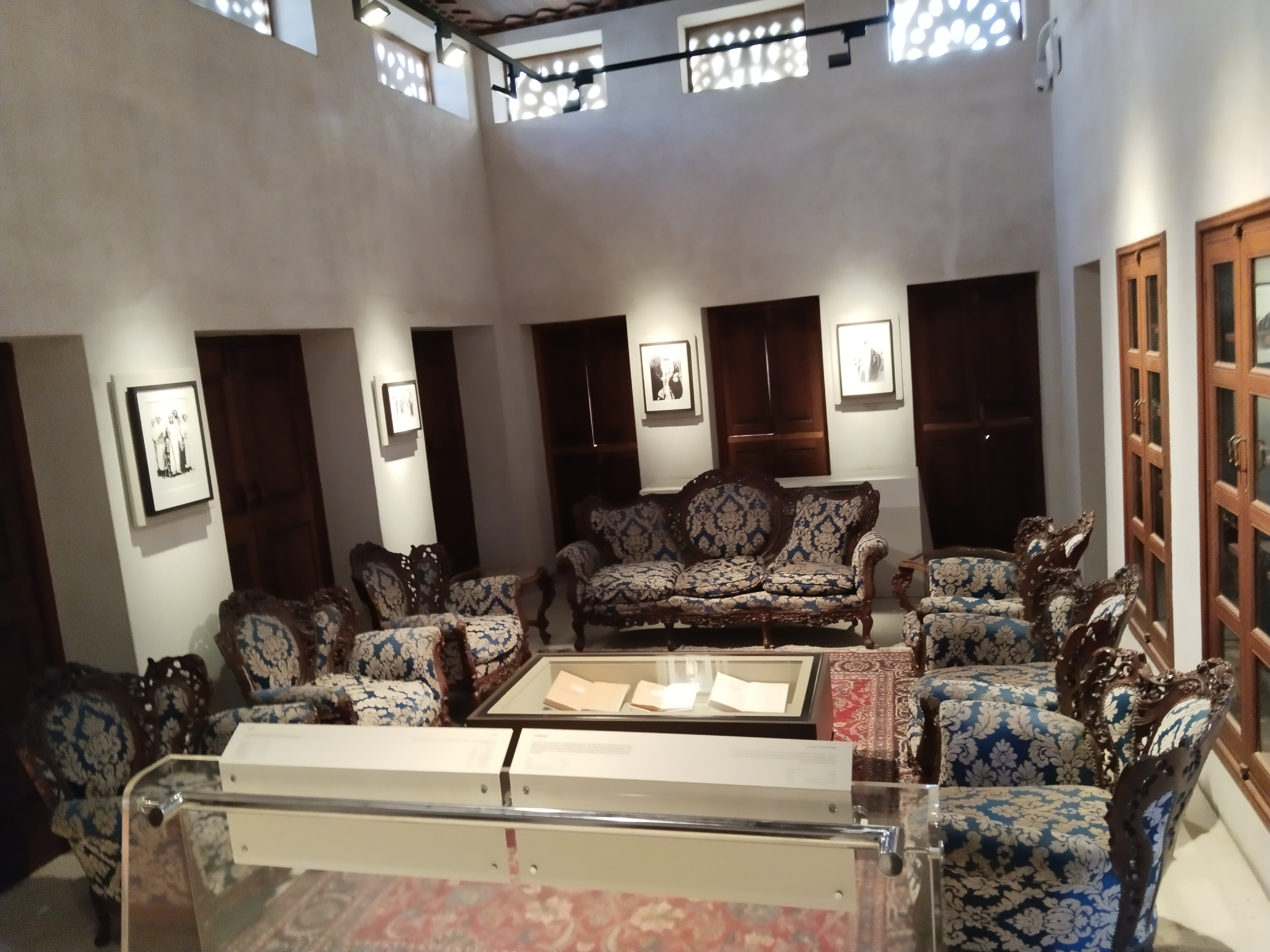

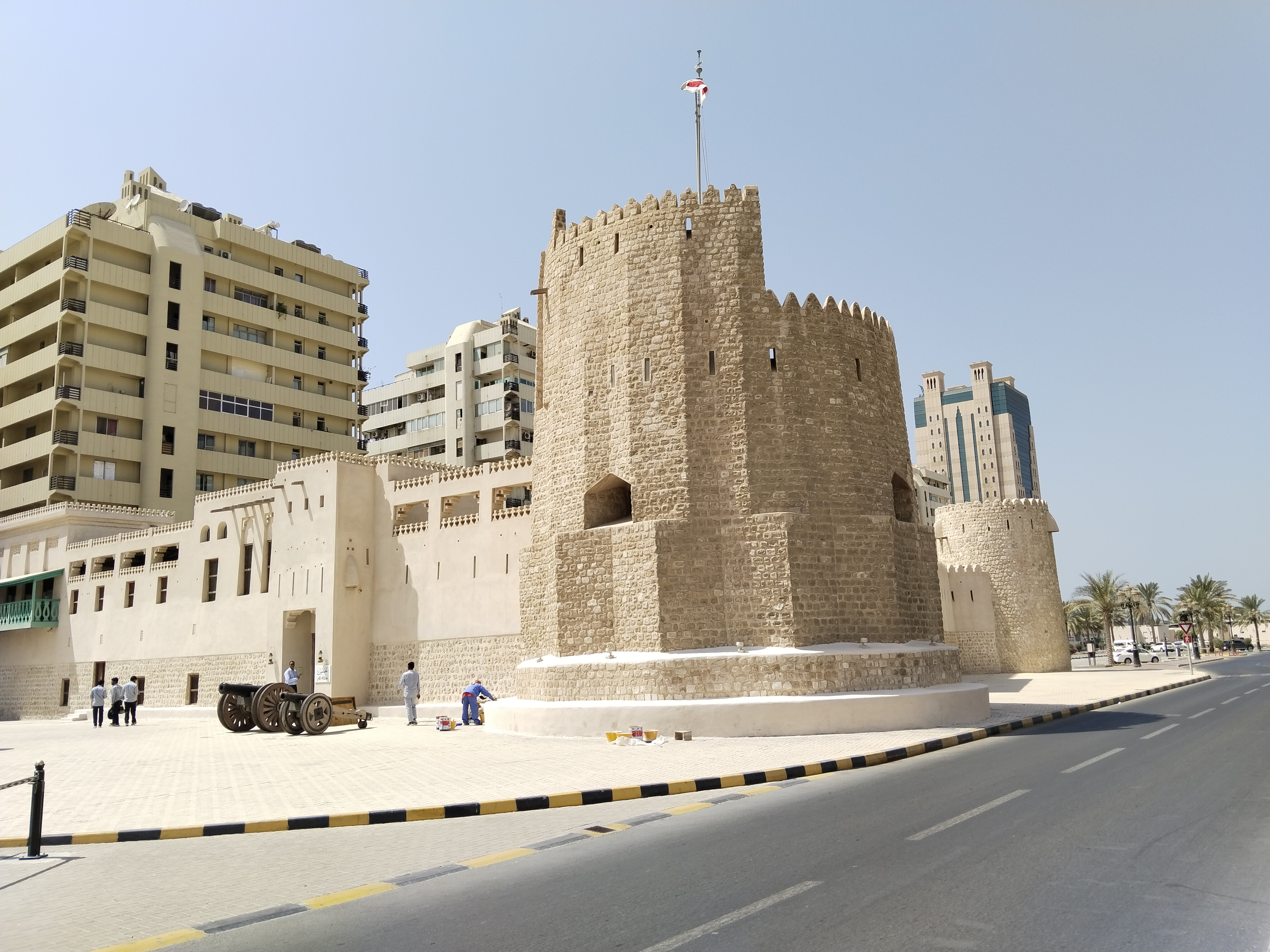

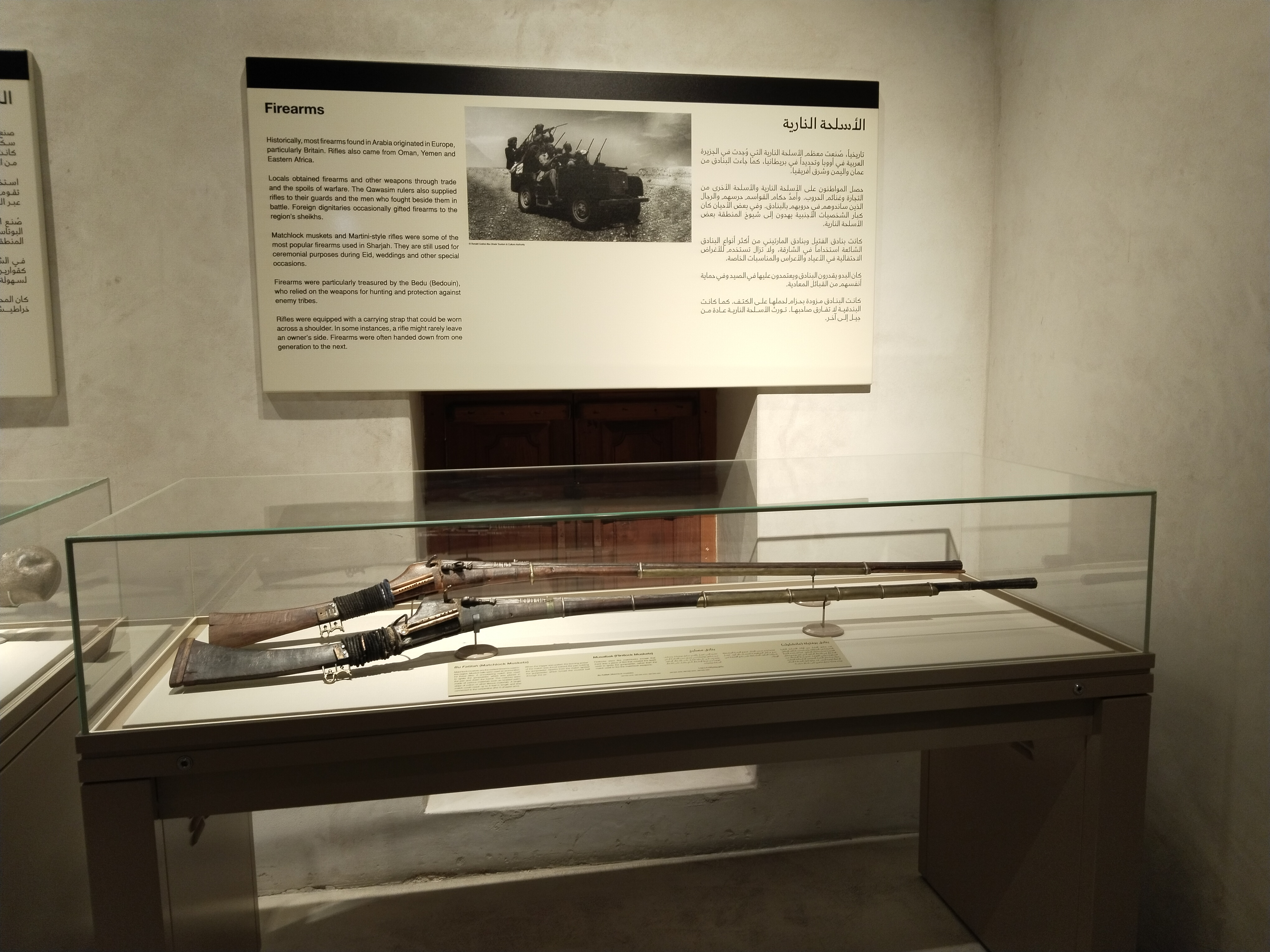

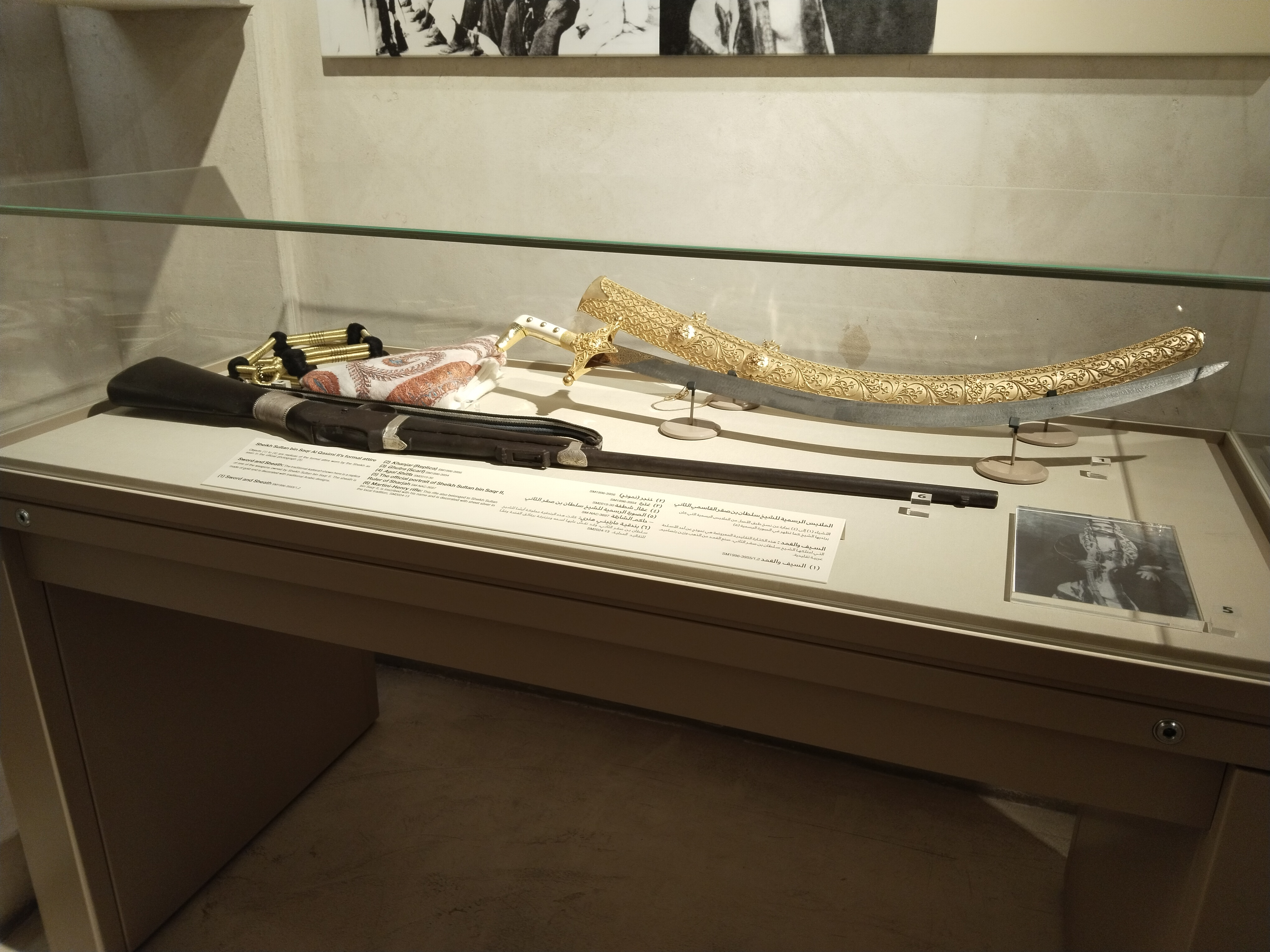

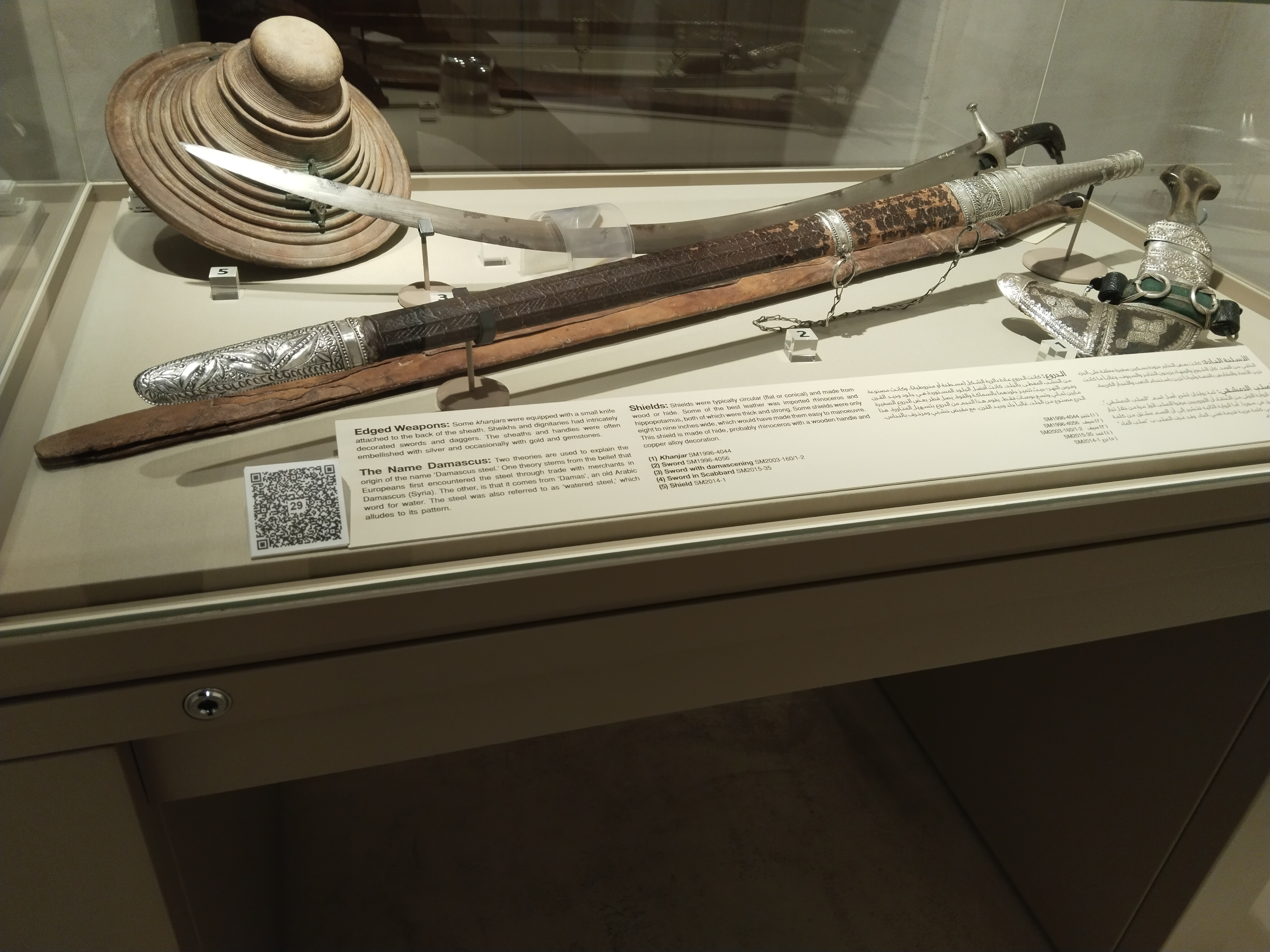

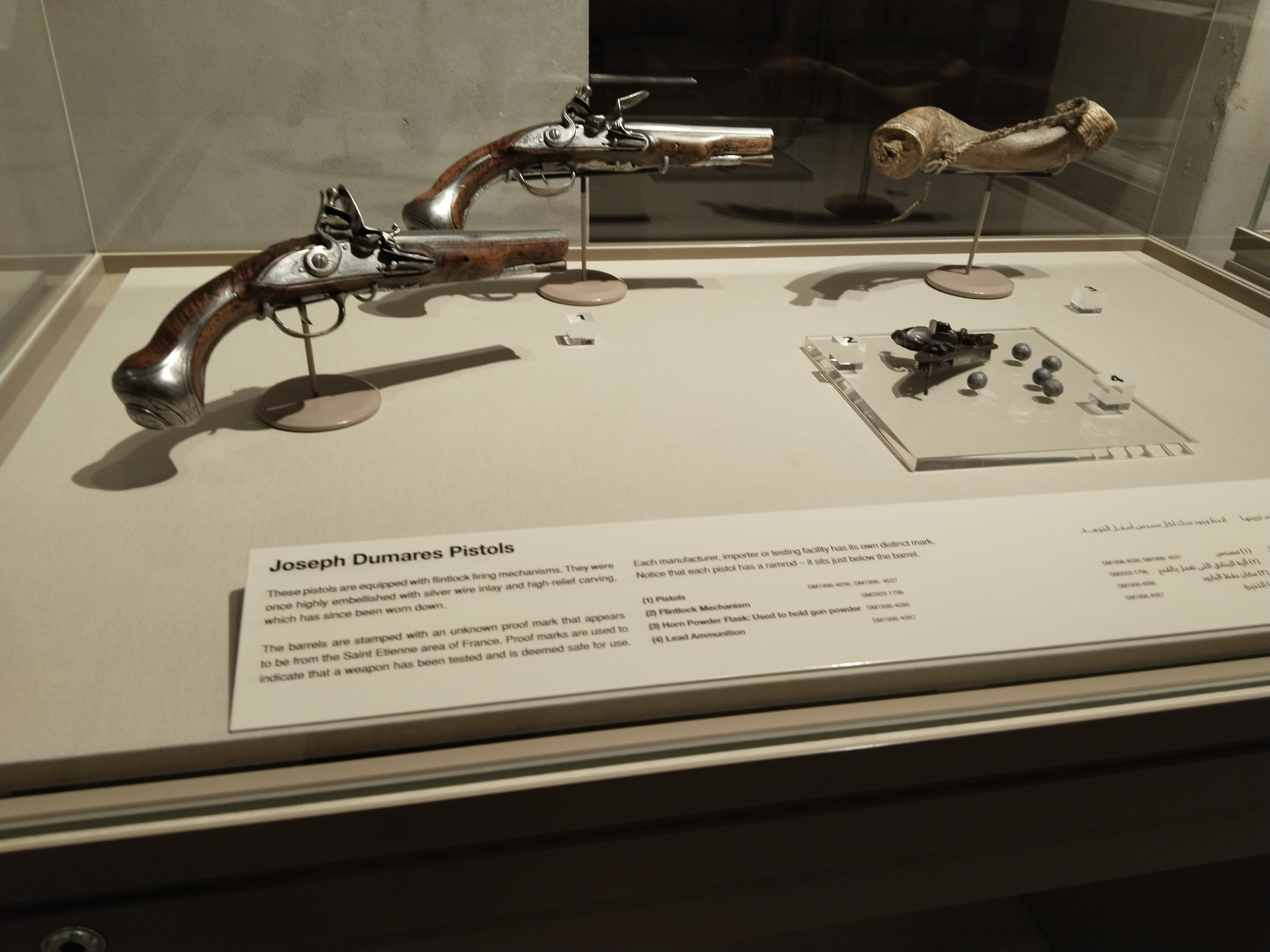
