= Wadi Siji =

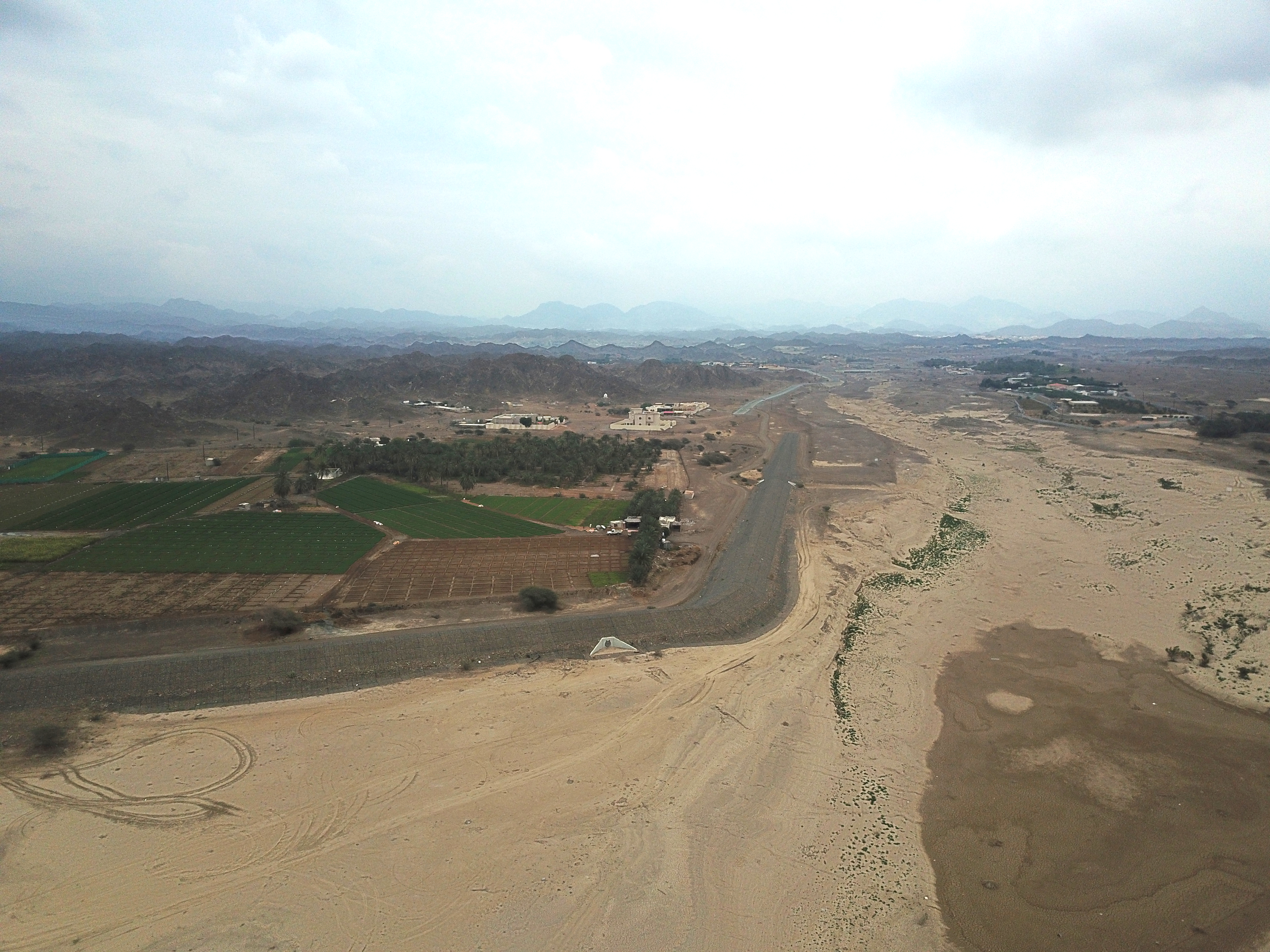
- The Wadi Siji in Fujairah

- Location within United Arab Emirates
- Coordinates: 25°14′59.5″N 56°04′26.4″E
- Country: United Arab Emirates
- Emirate: Ras Al Khaimah
- Elevation: 401 m (1,316 ft)

Wadi Siji is a seasonal watercourse in the Hajar Mountains of Fujairah, in the United Arab Emirates. The wadi runs from the Sharjah city of Dhaid to the mountain town of Masafi, where it meets the Wadi Ham and Wadi Abadila. It has long been a strategic route connecting the interior and East Coast of the UAE.

== Extent ==
The wadi is dammed at the village of Siji, where the Wadi Siji 'Old Dam' has a water storage capacity of 1.2 million cubic metres. The dam, constructed in the 1970s, is 10m high and 500m wide. Like many wadis in the Hajar Mountains, Wadi Siji is prone to seasonal flash floods and high water levels with at times tragic consequences. In 2001, UAE President Sheikh Zayed Al Nahyan ordered the construction of a further three dams at Siji, providing water resources for 312 homes and 210 farms in the area as part of a Dhs250 million national water infrastructure development project.

The area is a popular ecotourism destination.

The village is the location of the Siji Societal Majlis, opened in 2017 by the Crown Prince of Fujairah, one of a number of government investments in rural infrastructure that have improved communications, access and facilities. The planned Etihad Rail Network is scheduled to pass through Wadi Siji and a freight facility at Siji is due to be constructed as part of the second phase of the network rollout.

A number of quarries and crushers are located throughout Wadi Siji and the surrounding mountains. Finds of petroglyphs and gravesites have been made in the Wadi Siji, with petroglyphs found notably depicting horses and riders. The remains of old copper workings are also to be found in the area, particularly in the tributary Wadi Ashwani.

== See also ==
- List of wadis of the United Arab Emirates
