= Tunaij =

Bedouin tribe of the United Arab Emirates

Al Tunaij Arabic: الطنيج
- Arab tribe
- Ethnicity: Arab
- Location: United Arab Emirates
- Language: Arabic
- Religion: Islam

The Tunaij (Arabic: الطنيج), also spelled as Tanaij (singular Al Tunaiji Arabic: الطنيجي), is an Arab tribe of the United Arab Emirates (UAE). The Tunaij mostly settled in Dhaid, the inland oasis town of Sharjah, and the Ras Al Khaimah town of Rams. A small number of Tunaij also settled at Hamriyah.

At the turn of the 19th century, there were some 4,000 Tunaij in the Northern Emirates, of whom 1,500 were Bedouin. Influential in tribal politics because they could raise a force of some 500 fighting men, the Bedouin Tunaij used Dhaid as a centre and a fortified tower protected the 70-odd Tunaij houses there (the Na'im maintained a similar arrangement at Dhaid). The Tunaij have been linked to the Bani Qitab.

The Tunaij of Rams were mostly involved in pearl fishing and, during the pearling season, both Bedouin Tunaij and Shihuh would come to the coast to work as seasonal labour.
