= Al Bithnah =

Bithnah Arabic: البثنة
- Location within United Arab Emirates
- Coordinates: 25°11′20″N 56°13′58″E
- Country: United Arab Emirates
- Emirate: (Emirate of Fujairah) Fujairah
- Elevation: 0 m (0 ft)

Bithnah (Arabic: البثنة) is a village in Fujairah, United Arab Emirates (UAE), long occupying a strategic location in the Wadi Ham, which is the only natural link to the interior of the UAE and the Persian Gulf from the East Coast.

Located between Fujairah City and Masafi, the village is the site of a significant stone and mudbrick fort – Bithnah Fort – and a little-known megalithic tomb that links the village to a 4,000-year-old trade route along Wadi Ham through the Hajar Mountains from the East Coast emirate of Fujairah through Masafi (itself part of Ras Al Khaimah) and Manama down to the desert town of Dhaid and then to Sharjah and the Persian Gulf. It has traditionally been inhabited by members of the Sharqiyin tribe.

== History ==
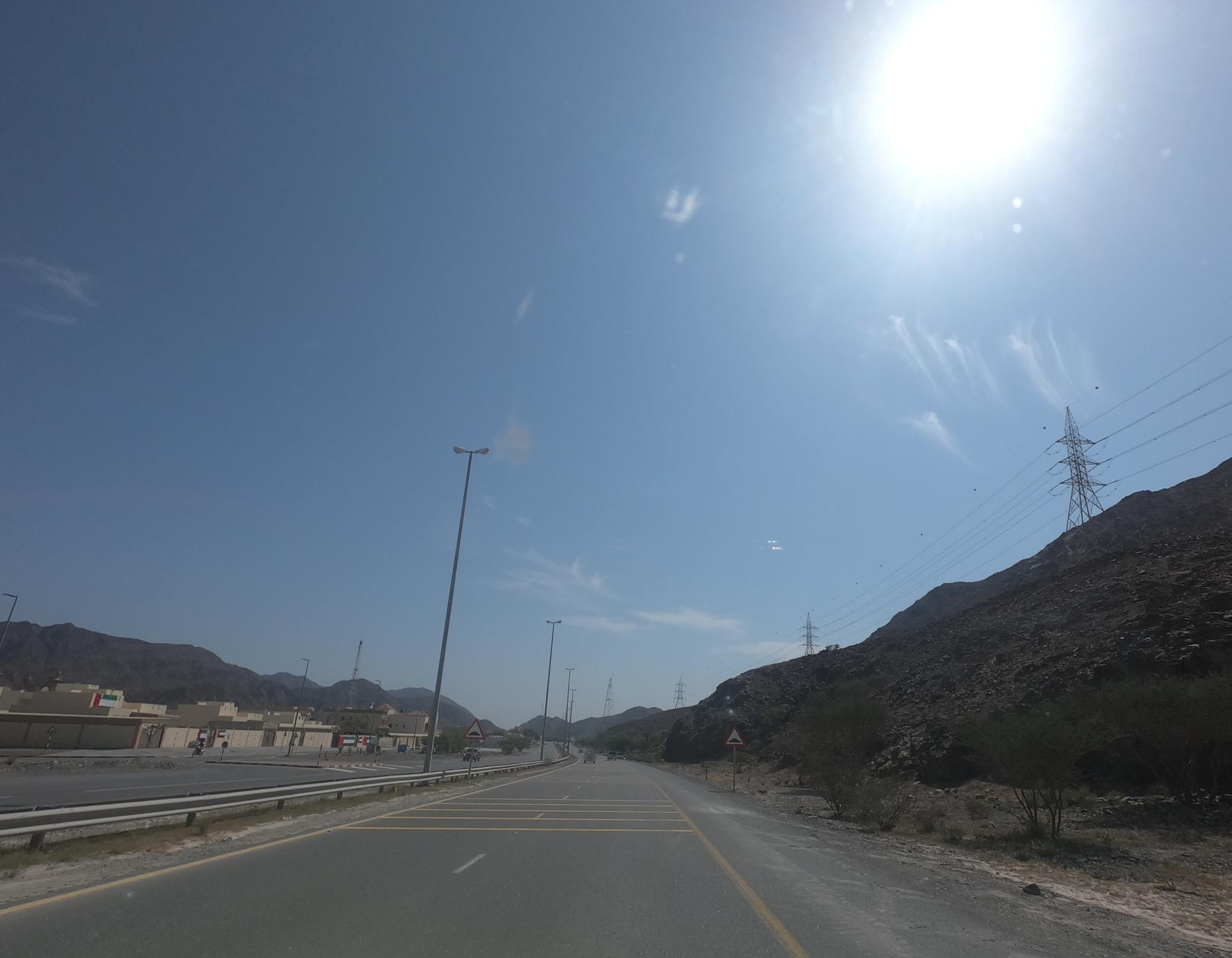
View of Al Bithnah from Sheikh Maktoum Bin Rashid Al Maktoum Road.

The Wadi Suq tomb at Bithnah was first excavated by the Swiss-Liechtenstein Foundation for Archaeological Research Abroad (SLFA) between 1987 and 1991. Presided over by Prince Hans-Adam II of Liechtenstein, and directed in the field by Pierre Corboud, the SLFA team conducted several seasons of survey in the mountainous inland area of Fujairah, including the excavations at Bithnah, where a communal Wadi Suq era grave site was uncovered as well as a number of Iron Age finds. There have also been excavations by teams from the University of Geneva and the French National Research Centre.

The Bithnah tomb is a longitudinal stone-lined pit and is unique in that it is T-shaped – although a number of Wadi Suq grave designs have been unearthed throughout the Emirates, from cloverleaf to barrow – only the Bithnah burial takes this particular T-shape.

Significant Iron Age finds have been made throughout the area, including several petroglyphs. Iron Age finds at Bithnah include buildings and structures that appear to have a religious function, together with finds of snake-decorated ceramics and incense burners, with columned halls and signs of a water distribution strategy tied to centralised authority. The link between snakes and water, evidence of funerary rites and snake worship, is strong. There are signs of abandonment in Bithah during the early Iron Age III period, consistent with the abandonment of nearby Masafi, at around 600 BCE.

Bithnah was the site of a significant battle in 1745 between members of the Qawasim (Al Qasimi) under Rahmah bin Matar Al Huwala and Na'im tribes and the Omani Imam and governor of Sohar, Ahmed bin Said. The battle took place when the Qawasim together with the Na’im of Buraimi attempted to fight their way through the Wadi Ham to take the east coast and its great prize, the port of Sohar. This was to mark a new era in the history of the area: the drawn-out battle between the Saidi Omanis and the Qawasim of Ras Al Khaimah and Sharjah, and other Ghafiri tribes of the west coast and interior.

By the turn of the 20th century, Bithnah was a village consisting of some 50 houses of Sharqiyin origin, with some 600 sheep and goats and 4,000 date palms.

== Bithnah Fort ==
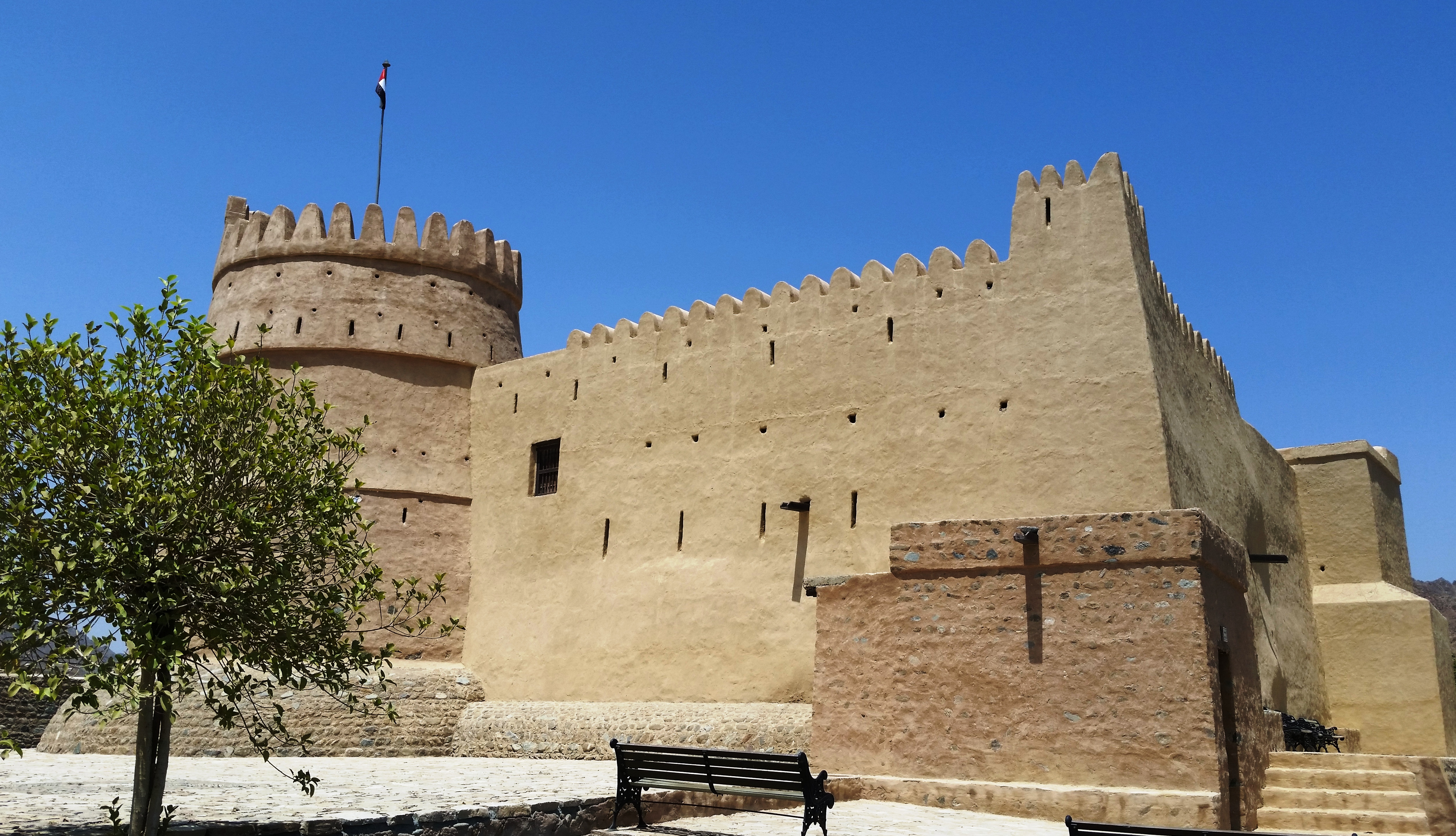
Bithnah Fort

Bithnah Fort is thought to date back to the late 18th century, having been built as a result of the Qawasim incursions of the early 1800s following the 1845 Battle of Bithnah. The fort is constructed from stone, mudbrick, and palm-wood planking.

Before the construction of the road to Masafi in the 1970s, traffic through to the interior from the coast passed through the bed of the wadi, overlooked by the fort which would have occupied a strategic location – in fact, Bithnah through the ages has been a strategic holding and was a key mainstay in the fortunes of the Sharqiyin through the 18th and early 19th centuries.

Before 2009, the fort was inhabited by a local man from Bithnah, Saed Ali Saed Al Yamahi.
