= Saif bin Hamad Al Sharqi =

- Sheikh

Ruler of Fujairah
- Reign: 1936–1938 (Note: Sources disagree on the dates of Saif's rule. Heard-Bey puts it as 'early 1930s until 1939', while Zahlan has him dying in 1938.)
- Predecessor: Hamad bin Abdullah Al Sharqi
- Successor: Mohammed bin Hamad Al Sharqi
- House: Al Sharqi

Sheikh Saif bin Hamad Al Sharqi was the Sheikh of Fujairah from 1936–1938 and head of the Sharqiyin tribe.

Nominally a dependency of Sharjah, then Abu Dhabi, Fujairah was effectively independent following a number of conflicts, not least of which were with its neighbours, the Sharjah dependencies of Kalba and Khor Fakkan.

Sheikh Saif bin Hamad took over from his long-lived father Hamad Al Sharqi, a powerful figure who had fought all his life for independence for Fujairah from Sharjah and for British recognition of Fujairah as a Trucial State in its own right. That dream would come true for his younger brother, Mohammed bin Hamad, who acceded in 1938 or 1939 on Saif's death.
