= Fujairah Adventure Park =

Tourist attraction in the United Arab Emirates

Coordinates: 25.13636°N 56.29971°E

Fujairah Adventure Park, is a tourist attraction in the emirate of Fujairah. The park has many activities and events related to adventure tourism.

The park was established in 2017 as ordered by Sheikh Mohammed bin Hamad Al Sharqi, former crown prince of Fujairah, with the aim of organizing and developing adventure tourism in various areas in Fujairah, in addition to supporting the project of establishing commercial companies active in the field of adventure tourism alongside establishing an adventure training center that offers workshops and training sessions specialized in the field delivered by international specialized trainers.

== Activities ==
The park has a large data base of members of the park, and it also specializes in adventure activities on the scale of the UAE and the Middle East. The park includes an area for children aged 2 and above, an area for families, an area for jumping, a bike track, hiking trails, and mountain biking. It also has a complete control system, providing safety and security.

The park offers children training, aiming to provide them with athletic skills in the field of adventure. Also, it offers monthly training sessions for adventurers, in addition to having a special area for renting bikes, adventure equipment, and for training adventurers from all age groups.

== Events ==
The park sponsors a number of events related to mountain adventures. In 2021, Zayed Volunteer Group For Research and Rescue organized an Enduro Championship for mountain bike racing in the park. Moreover, the park will be hosting the Open Bump Track championship in 2023, where it will have participants from different nationalities and age groups, as the park will recruit over 60 participants from different countries.
