= Mohammed bin Hamad Al Sharqi =

Ruler of Fujairah(1908–1974)

- Ruler Of Fujairah, UAE
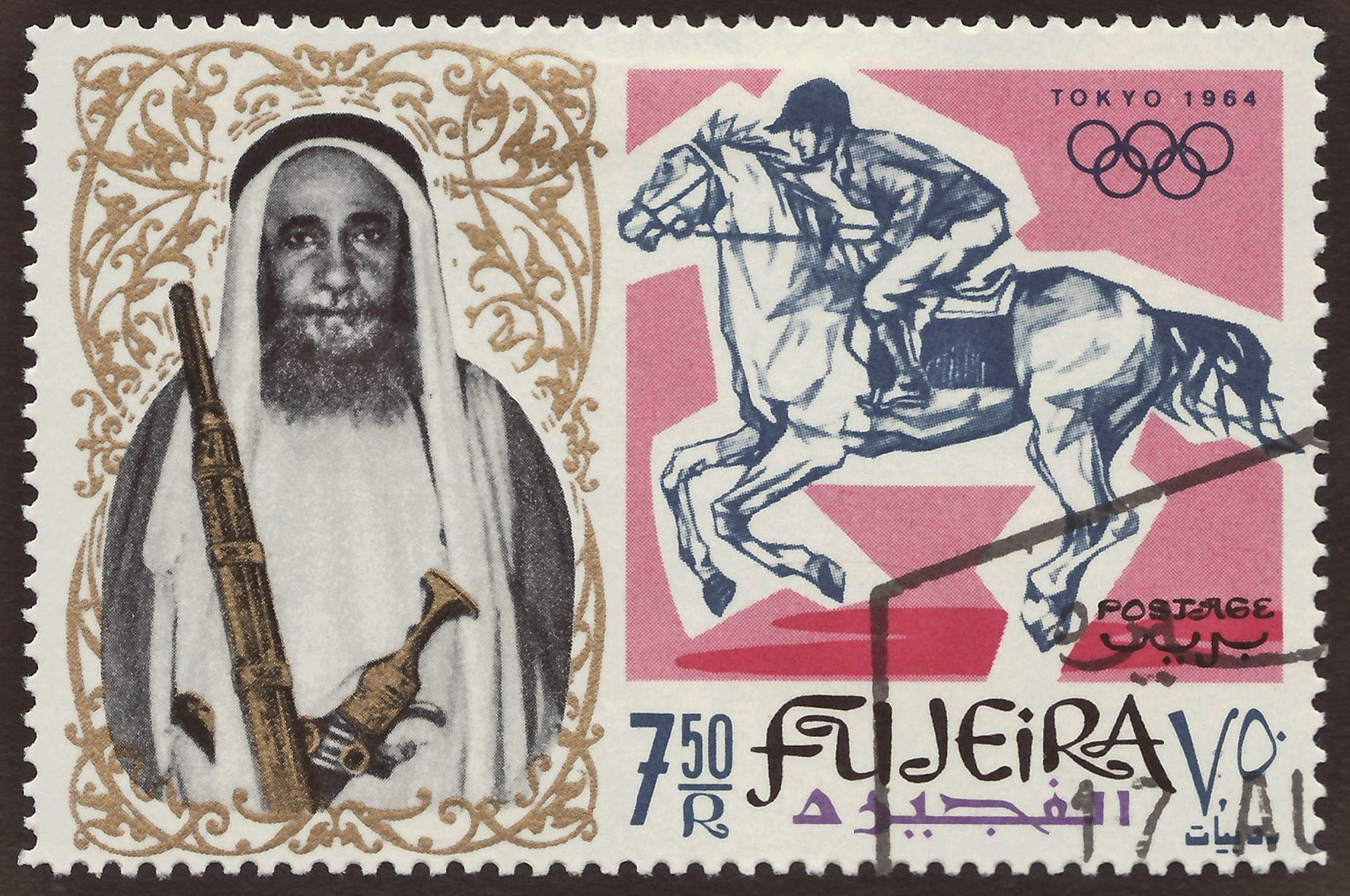
- Mohammed bin Hamad Al Sharqi pictured on a Fujairah postage stamp

Ruler of Fujairah
- Reign: 1938–1974
- Predecessor: Saif bin Hamad Al Sharqi
- Successor: Hamad bin Mohammed Al Sharqi
- Born: 1908
- Died: 6 September 1974 (aged 65–66); London, UK
- House: Al Sharqi

Sheikh Mohammed bin Hamad Al Sharqi (1908 – 6 September 1974) was an Emirati royal, politician and a founding father of the United Arab Emirates who served as the ruler of Fujairah from 1938–1974. In 1952 he was to see his father's long-held dream of independence for Fujairah recognised by the British, the last Trucial State to be so recognised, as well as shortly afterwards to help take the UAE to independence as a nation, in 1971.

== Ruler of Fujairah ==
=== Accession ===
Mohammed bin Hamad succeeded as head of the Sharqiyin tribe and Sheikh of Fujairah in 1939 on the death of his elder brother, Saif bin Hamad, and immediately set about consolidating the Sharqiyin holdings of Fujairah and its surroundings. By 1950, he had won over Dibba to the North, as well as the coastal settlements of Bidayah and Sakamkam and the inland village of Al Bithnah the strategically important Al Bithnah Fort dominating the Wadi Ham.

=== Trucial status ===
The British had staunchly refused recognition of Fujairah's independence in the 50-odd years since Mohammed's father had proclaimed it in 1901. However, by the 1950s PCL, Petroleum Concessions Limited, was seeking oil exploration concessions throughout the Trucial States and the company needed someone they could 'do business with'. The government (by now affairs in the Trucial States were squarely in the hands of the Foreign Office in London following Indian independence in 1947) decided to grant Mohammed bin Hamad recognition as a Trucial Ruler and he acceded in 1952 as the Ruler of the seventh emirate to be so recognised (Kalba, previously recognised as a Trucial State in 1939, was subsumed back into Sharjah in 1951).

=== Independence ===
Fujairah was the last of the Trucial States to become a British protectorate where the British government took care of foreign policy and defence. While others had signed the General Maritime Treaty of 1820, the Perpetual Maritime Truce of 1853, and the 'Exclusive Agreement' of 1892, Fujairah was to enjoy just sixteen years of British protection until British Prime Minister Harold Wilson's announcement, on 16 January 1968, that all British troops were to be withdrawn from 'East of Aden'. The decision was to pitch the coastal emirates, together with Qatar and Bahrain, into fevered negotiations to fill the political vacuum that the British withdrawal would leave behind.

Mohammed bin Hamad was to join the meeting of Trucial Rulers on 25 February 1968 in Dubai, at which the principle of founding a union of emirates was laid out by the rulers of Abu Dhabi, Sheikh Zayed bin Sultan Al Nahyan, and Sheikh Rashid bin Saeed Al Maktoum of Dubai. Over the next two years, negotiations and meetings of the rulers followed—often stormy—as a form of union was thrashed out. Bahrain and Qatar dropped out of talks and Ras Al Khaimah decided not to accede to the Union, leaving six of the seven former Trucial States to agree on union on 18 July 1971.

On 2 December 1971, Fujairah, together with Abu Dhabi, Sharjah, Ajman and Umm Al Quwain joined in the Act of Union to form the United Arab Emirates. The seventh emirate, Ras Al Khaimah, joined the UAE on 10 February 1972, following Iran's annexation of the RAK-claimed Tunbs islands.

=== Border dispute in 1972 ===
The long history of squabbles and disputes between Fujairah and its neighbour came to the fore once again following the act of Union, when a land dispute broke out into open fighting. In early 1972, the newly founded Union Defence Force was called in to take control of the fighting which, by the time the UDF moved in, had killed 22 and seriously injured a dozen more. The dispute was finally settled after mediation between Sheikh Rashid of Dubai and other Rulers and a statement announcing the settlement was sent out on 17 July 1972.

== Death ==
Sheikh Mohammed bin Hamad Al Sharqi died in 1974. He was succeeded by his son, Sheikh Hamad bin Mohammed Al Sharqi, the present Ruler of Fujairah.
