= Mohammed bin Hamad bin Mohammed Al Sharqi =

Crown Prince of the Emirate of Fujairah

Mohammed bin Hamad Al Sharqi محمد بن حمد الشرقي
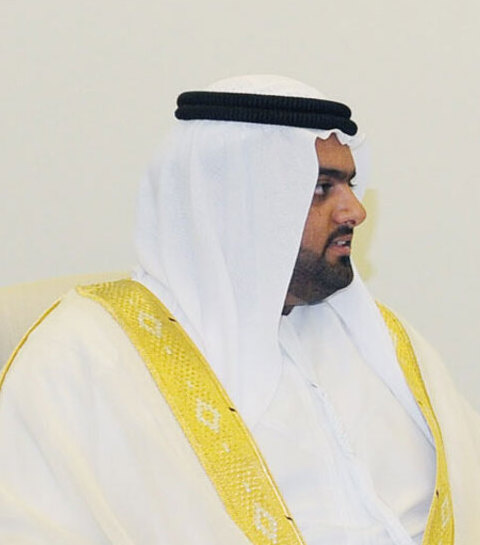
- Sheikh Mohammed in 2012

Crown Prince of Fujairah
- Tenure: 8 January 2007 – present
- Monarch: Hamad bin Mohammed Al Sharqi
- Predecessor: Hamad bin Mohammed Al Sharqi
- Born: 1 April 1986 (age 40); Fujairah, United Arab Emirates
- Spouses: Latifa bint Mohammed bin Rashid Al Maktoum (III) (m. 2009)
- Issue: Hamad; Aisha; Fatima; Rashid; Hind
Names
- Mohammed bin Hamad bin Mohammed bin Hamad bin Abdullah Al Sharqi
- Arabic: محمد بن حمد بن محمد الشرقي
- House: Al Sharqi
- Father: Hamad bin Mohammed Al Sharqi
- Mother: Fatima bint Thani Al Maktoum
- Religion: Islam

Styles of Crown Prince of Fujairah
- Reference style: His Highness
- Spoken style: Your Highness

Sheikh Mohammed bin Hamad bin Mohammed Al Sharqi (Arabic: محمد بن حمد بن محمد الشرقي, romanized: Muḥammad bin Ḥamad bin Muḥammad al-Sharqī; born 1 April 1986) is the Crown Prince of the Emirate of Fujairah, in the United Arab Emirates. He is the eldest son of Sheikh Hamad bin Mohammed Al Sharqi, Member of the Supreme Council, Sheikh of Fujairah and Chairman of the Fujairah Foundation for Regions Development.

He attended Milton Abbey School a boarding independent school in the village of Milton Abbas, near the market town of Blandford Forum in Dorset in South West England. He is a graduate of Webster University, London.

Sheikh Mohammed bin Hamad, Crown Prince of Fujairah, married the daughter of Sheikh Mohammed bin Rashid Al Maktoum, Vice President, Prime Minister of the UAE and Ruler of Dubai.

== Family ==
In February 2009, he married his second cousin Sheikha Latifa bint Mohammed bin Rashid Al Maktoum, daughter of the current ruler of Dubai and sister to all the Crown Prince of Dubai Hamdan bin Mohammed Al Maktoum, its two deputy rulers Maktoum bin Mohammed Al Maktoum and Ahmed bin Mohammed Al Maktoum. They have five children together, two sons and three daughters:

- Sheikh Hamad bin Mohammed Al Sharqi (born 29 December 2009).
- Sheikha Aisha bint Mohammed Al Sharqi (born 1 November 2011).
- Sheikha Fatima bint Mohammed Al Sharqi (born 11 March 2014).
- Sheikh Rashid bin Mohammed Al Sharqi (born 15 December 2015).
- Sheikha Hind bint Mohammed Al Sharqi (born 22 June 2020).
