= Sharqiyin =

Ruling family of Fujairah, United Arab Emirates

- Arab tribe
- Ethnicity: Arab
- Location: United Arab Emirates
- Language: Arabic
- Religion: Islam

The Sharqiyin (Arabic: الشرقيون, singular Al Sharqi Arabic: الشرقي) is a tribe of the United Arab Emirates (UAE).

The Sharqiyin were long the dominant (traditionally Ghafiri) tribe along the East coast of the Trucial States (and the second most numerous in the area around the start of the 19th century), an area known as Shamailiyah. A 1968 census showed 90% of the tribal population of Fujairah was Sharqiyin. They were originally dependents of Sharjah and made several attempts to secede and declare independence, finally practically managing this from 1901 onwards, gaining British recognition as a Trucial State, Fujairah, in 1952.

They settled all along the East Coast of the Trucial States, from Kalba to Dibba, as well as in the Wadi Ham and Jiri plain and by the turn of the 20th century they were some 7,000 strong. Three sections of the tribe are notable, the Hafaitat (from which the ruling family of Fujairah derives), the Yammahi and the Hamudiyin. After the Bani Yas, the Sharqiyin were the second most numerous tribe in the Trucial States.

== Independence ==
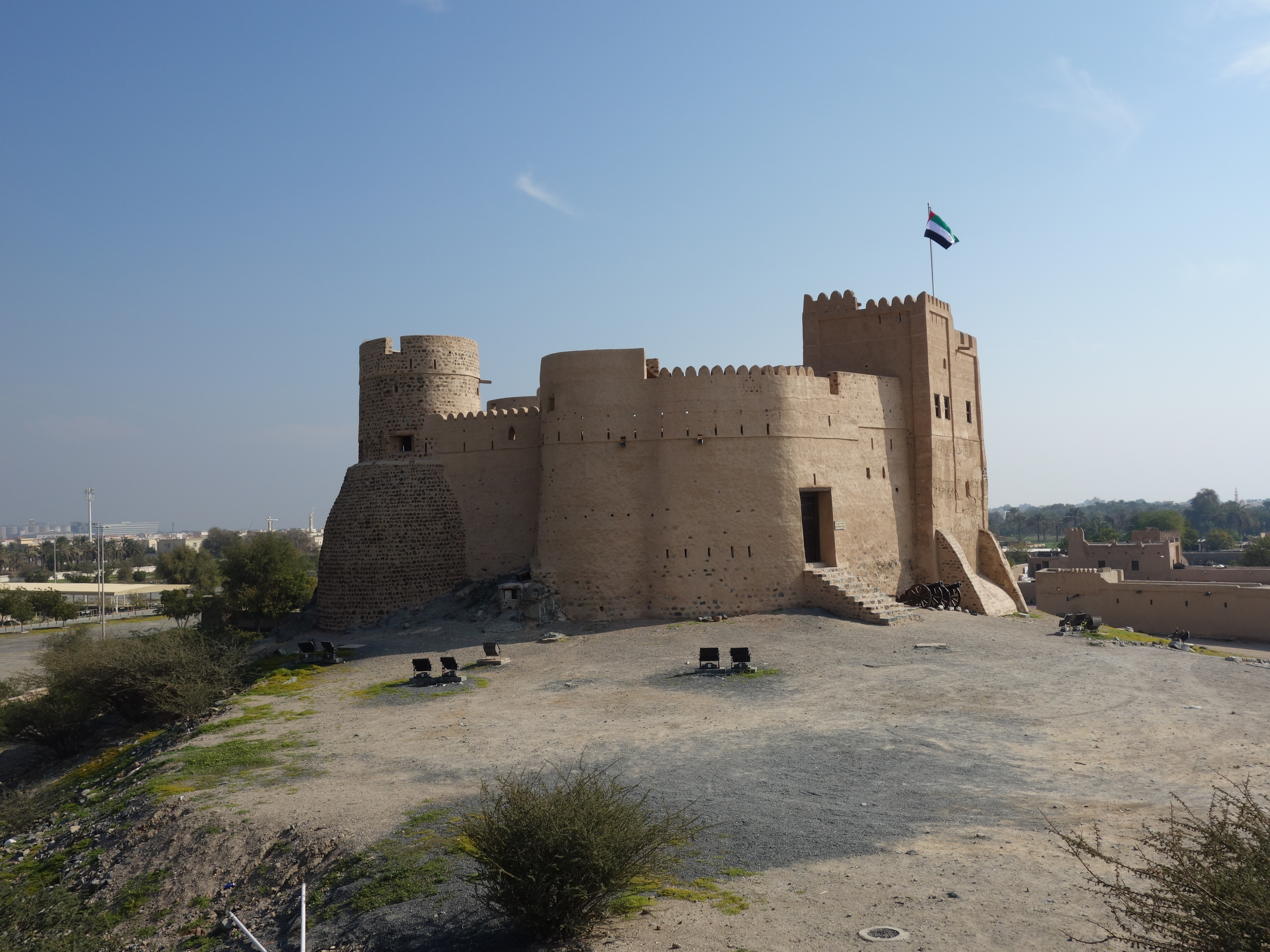
Fujairah Fort today

The Sharqiyin first withheld tribute to Sharjah in 1866, on the death of Sultan bin Saqr Al Qasimi, when their headman, Abdullah bin Khamis Al Sharqi rebelled. Sultan's son Khalid ruled for two years following his father's death, but it was Khalid's successor, Salim bin Sultan Al Qasimi, who attempted to bring the Sharqiyin to heel by sending an army against Dibba, which came up against a combined force of Sharqiyin and allied Shihuh tribesmen. Pinned down, the force could not be relieved as the Shihuh held the Wadi Abadilah, but nevertheless Salim sued for peace and managed to include the restitution of tribute as part of the agreement.

Another rebellion took place in 1876, when the Al Qasimi Wali of Dibba jailed twelve Sharqiyin. Again, Salim bin Sultan faced a Sharqiyin/Shihu alliance and his force was blocked from travelling along the Wadi Abadilah. He applied for Brititsh permission to send a force by sea, but was denied. He then sent the force anyway, consisting of 50 men, as well as a force of 800 crossing a southern pass of the Hajar Mountains and passing through Kalba before taking Fujairah Fort, killing 36 and capturing 30 Sharqiyin. Salim was found by the British to be in breach of the Maritime Truce but a ruling that the truce applied to the East Coast was not made until 1880 and Salim appears to have escaped any consequence for his breach.

In 1879, the head of the Hafaitat, Sheikh Hamad bin Abdullah Al Sharqi, led an insurrection against Sheikh Saqr bin Khalid Al Qasimi of Sharjah, who claimed suzerainty over the Shamaliyah and had placed a slave named Sarur in charge of Fujairah. The insurrection replaced Sarur and a delegation was sent to Sheikh Saqr but they were badly received, imprisoned and a force sent back against the insurrectionists, taking Fujairah Fort and forcing Hamad bin Abdullah into exile in Muscat. At the end of that year Hamad returned from his exile and led a fresh bid to proclaim the independence of Fujairah, this time forcing a rout of Fujairah Fort, with eight men among the defenders killed.

The settlement of a peace was placed in front of the Ruler of Ras Al Khaimah to arbitrate. British opinion of the time was that Fujairah's independence was not desirable and so, in 1881, Hamad bin Abdullah accepted the suzerainty of Sharjah and agreed to pay tribute to Salim bin Sultan. In 1884, following three years of relative peace on the east coast, Hamad bin Abdullah once again led a rebellion against Sharjah and took control of Ghurfa (the centre of Fujairah today) and the strategic Bithnah Fort, which guards the Wadi Ham access to the interior. Hamad appealed to both to Humaid bin Abdullah Al Qasimi of Ras Al Khaimah and Turki bin Said of Muscat for protection against Sharjah (the British advised Turki not to become involved). Ultimately, Saqr bin Khalid of Sharjah failed to act against Humaid and thereby lost effective control of the entire east coast.

This move would support Hamad's eventual declaration of independence from Sharjah in 1901, a move which enjoyed the recognition of this status by all concerned, with the sole exception of the British, and following a move to declare fealty to Abu Dhabi in 1903, Fujairah was considered fully independent by 1906, although again not formally recognised as a Trucial State by the British. Fujairah's status as a Trucial State was not to be formally recognised by the British until 1952.

Hamad bin Abdullah was involved in open conflict with the British in 1925 when he bought a Baluchi girl from Muscat in contravention to the embargo on slave trading. Francis Bellville Prideaux, the British Resident in the Persian Gulf, anchored off Fujairah in the RIMS Lawrence and requested Hamad bin Abdullah to board, which Hamad refused despite several invitations. Prideaux commenced a bombardment of Fujairah Fort, destroying three of the fort's towers and killing Hamad's daughter-in-law in the process.

Subsisting in the main on agriculture, pearling and fishing, the Sharqiyin lived a relatively harsh life, a fact underlined by a survey of the late 1960s, which showed the majority of households in the emirate of Fujairah still lived in barasti (palm frond) houses.

== Conflict ==
The Sharqiyin were frequently in conflict with their neighbours, particularly the Shihuh, Khawatir and Naqbiyin, but would make common cause with these against Sharjah whenever the opportunity arose.

The long history of squabbles and disputes between the Sharqiyn and neighbouring tribes came to the fore once again following the act of Union, when a land dispute with Kalba broke out into open fighting. In early 1972, the newly founded Union Defence Force was called in to take control of the fighting which, by the time the UDF moved in, had killed 22 and seriously injured a dozen more. The dispute was finally settled after mediation between Sheikh Rashid of Dubai and other Rulers and a statement announcing the settlement was sent out on 17 July 1972.
