= Rahma bin Matar Al Qasimi =

- Sheikh

Ruler of Ras Al Khaimah
- Reign: 1722–1747
- Successor: Rashid bin Matar Al Qasimi
- House: Al Qasimi

Sheikh Rahma bin Matar Al Qasimi (also known as Rahma bin Matar Al Huwala) was the ruler of Ras Al Khaimah from 1722-1747 and was the founder of the Al Qasimi dynasty, which rules Ras Al Khaimah and Sharjah in the United Arab Emirates today.

== Accession ==
Rahma bin Matar united Ras Al Khaimah and Sharjah in a federation that would also include Bandar Abbas on the Persian coast and the Gulf islands of Qeshm and Larak. He headed the Huwala people, the heirs to the remnants of the Arab Eastern trade network centred on Hormuz and Julfar that was smashed and appropriated by the Portuguese in the early 16th Century.

=== War for Oman ===
Rahma headed the Ghafiri forces who took Rustaq during the conflict between the Hinawi and Ghafiri factions for control of Oman, bringing a force of some 6,500 men made up of members of the tribes of the coast and interior to the battle. It was then Rahma bin Mattar who offered battle to the Hinawi force under Kaza Al Darmaki, with whom Rahmah had a feud. Armed with wheeled cannon, (‘guns which were drawn over the ground’, according to Omani historian Ibn Razik) Rahmah met up with the rest of the Ghafiri forces. They used the cannon to bombard the fleet of the head of the Hinawi faction, Khalaf Al Hinai, who was nicknamed ‘the dwarf ’.

=== Qeshm ===
Rahma is first mentioned in British records in 1727, when compensation was 'extracted' from him for operating a rival factory at Basidu on Qeshm ('factories' weren't manufacturing facilities but trading posts) to the British factory at Bandar Abbas. The British at the time called the Qawasim (plural of Al Qasimi), 'Joasmees'. The East India Company had first established trading outposts in the area in the 1660s and by 1700 had consolidated that presence. In 1720, a group of 'Muscat Arabs' had taken control of Qeshm and the Afghan invasion of Persia had prevented the Persians from expelling them. In April 1727 the British Persian Resident, Draper, proceeded against Rahma's rival port with the frigate Britannia, the galley Bengal and two 'trankies' (dhows) in support. The expedition mounted against Rahma was intended to make good the loss in profit to the East India Company caused by Rahma's commercial rivalry.

=== Battle of Bithnah ===
With the Persians, Afghans, French, Dutch and English all vying for positions in the area, conflict was constant. A defining moment came when the Persian Shah Nadir Shah invaded Oman in 1737. The subsequent rout of the Persian force resulted in the elevation of the Omani Imam, Ahmed bin Saeed and his attempt to have the Qawasim of Ras Al Khaimah acknowledge his suzeirainty, which resulted in an Omani defeat at Rahma's hands in the 1745 Battle of Bithnah. The conflict between the Qawasim and the Imam would endure for the coming decade.

Nadir Shah had built up a naval force, but a mutiny by his Arab crews in August 1740 saw a significant portion of that force defect to Rahma at both Qeshm and Ras Al Khaimah, bolstering Rahma's naval strength by 'three ships, a grab and a brigantine'. A Dutch expedition mounted to recover the boats failed as did a subsequent Persian attempt.
