= Hamad bin Abdullah Al Sharqi =

- Sheikh

Ruler of Fujairah
- Successor: Saif bin Hamad Al Sharqi
- House: Al Sharqi

Sheikh Hamad bin Abdullah Al Sharqi was the first recognised leader of the Al Sharqi Ruling family of Fujairah, one of the Trucial States and today one of the United Arab Emirates (UAE). He led Fujairah in a number of insurrections against Al Qasimi rule, presiding over a turbulent time when the emirate was practically independent but denied recognition of status as a Trucial State in its own right by the British.

== Insurrection ==
Hamad was headman of Fujairah town in 1879 when he led an insurrection in spring of that year against Sheikh Saqr bin Khalid Al Qasimi of Sharjah, who claimed suzerainty over the Gulf of Oman coast (known as Shamaliyah) and had placed a slave named Sarur in charge of Fujairah. This followed a prolonged period of contested ownership of areas of the coast between the Al Qasimi of Sharjah and Ras Al Khaimah and the Sultan of Muscat.

The insurrection replaced Sarur and a delegation was sent to Sheikh Saqr but they were badly received, imprisoned and a force sent back against the insurrectionists, taking Fujairah Fort (garrisoning it with Baluchi mercenaries) and forcing Hamad bin Abdullah into exile in Muscat, where he lobbied the Sultan of Muscat, Turki Bin Said for support. Turki was advised by the British not to become involved, and reminded that Fujairah was recognised Al Qasimi territory and that in 1871 he had signed a document ceding the coast from Kalba to Sharjah (but with the exception of Khasab) to the Al Qasimi. At the end of that year or possibly early 1880, Hamad returned from his exile and led a fresh bid to proclaim the independence of Fujairah, this time forcing a rout of Fujairah Fort, with eight men among the defenders killed.

The settlement of a peace was placed in front of the Ruler of Ras Al Khaimah to arbitrate and, in 1881, Hamad bin Abdullah signed a document confirming him as a dependent of Sharjah. It was the British viewpoint at the time that the 'complete independence of Fujairah ought not to be promoted'. However, Hamad was a troublesome subject and played both Sharjah and Ras Al Khaimah off against each other, as well as involving the Sultan in Muscat wherever he could.

== Al Bithnah fort ==
In 1884, Hamad took control of Ghurfa (today an area in the middle of Fujairah city) and Al Bithnah Fort, a strategically important asset guarding the Wadi Ham, which was the major route inland from Shamaliyah.

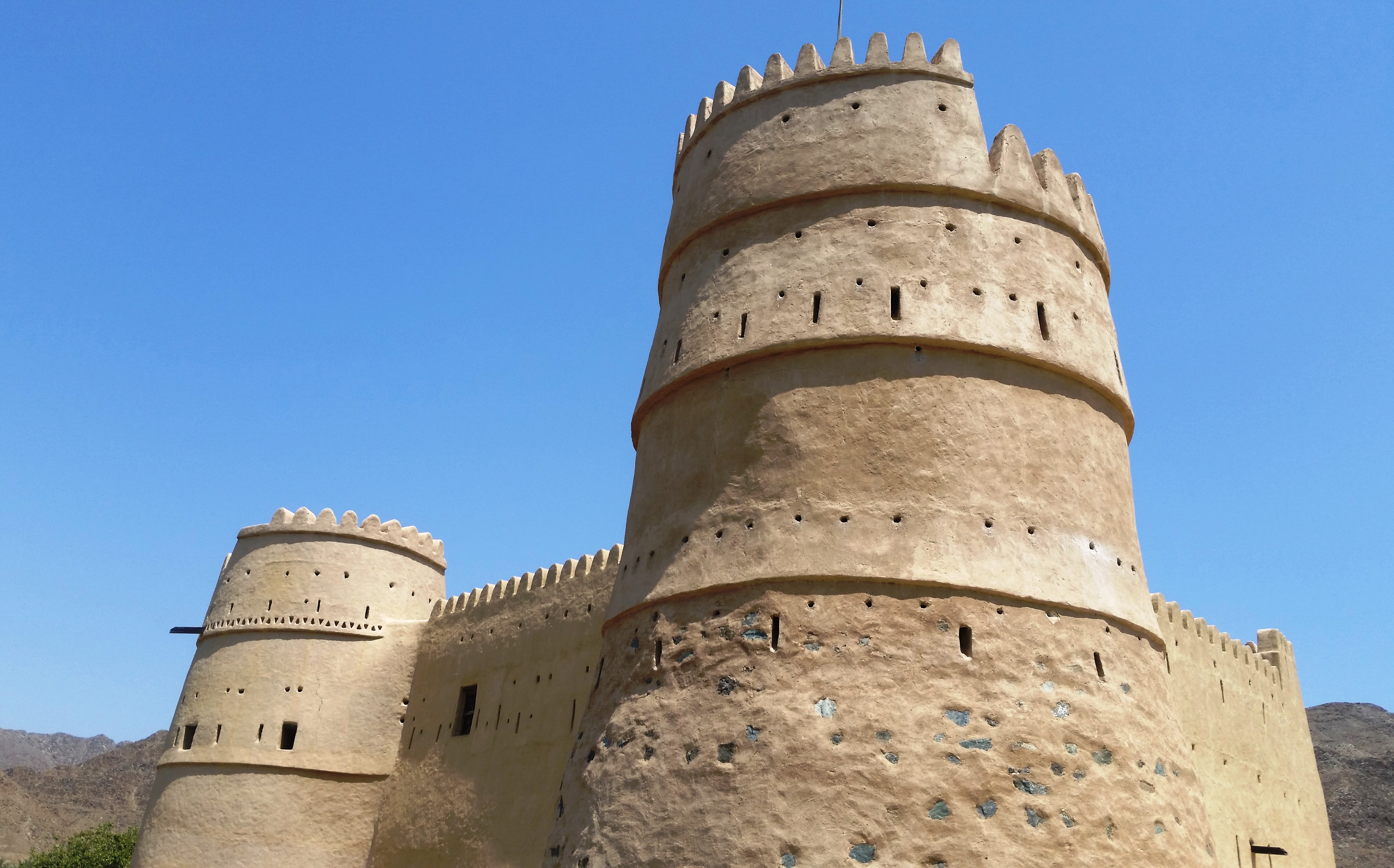
Bithnah Fort

Control of Bithnah was to be essential for Hamad bin Abdullah when, in 1901, he once again refused the suzerainty of Sharjah and used the fort at Bithnah to refuse aid to the headman of Kalba, who was related to Sheikh Saqr bin Khalid of Sharjah. He then appealed to Humaid bin Abdullah of Ras Al Khaimah for protection against Sharjah.

As in so many occasions in the history of the Trucial States, the dispute flared up and each side gathered its backers. In April 1902, Saqr bin Khalid had gathered a force of 250 mounted Bedouin to attack Fujairah, while Hamad bin Abdullah petitioned Dubai and Ajman as well as the Sultan of Muscat for their help. The British caught wind of the impending conflict and intervened, warning Muscat and Dubai to stand down. Attempting to mediate the dispute in Sharjah, the British Residency Agent found both Saqr bin Khalid protesting that he could not control his Bedouin and Hamad bin Abdullah refusing to recognise a safe pass to Sharjah as legitimate.

In November, repenting of his conciliatory attitude, Saqr bin Khalid had two Fujairah men killed on their way to Ajman.

The next month, the British Political Agent in Bahrain, Gaskin, travelled to Sharjah in the RIMS Lawrence and then on to Fujairah, holding two days of negotiations between the warring parties. The situation onshore being increasingly threatening and both parties intractable, the attempt was abandoned and the British left them to it, with the sole proviso that they wouldn't break the Maritime Peace.

Declaring his independence in 1901, Sheikh Hamad enjoyed the recognition of this status by all concerned, with the sole exception of the British.

In 1903, the British once again decided not to recognise Fujairah but to consider it a dependency of Sharjah. Despite a sally by Saqr bin Khalid against Bithnah early in the year and an exhortation to peace by Curzon during his 1903 vice regal Durbar, Fujairah remained a nominal dependency at best and in 1906 was claimed as a dependency of Abu Dhabi, with no opposition from Sharjah.

== War with Kalba and Khor Fakkan ==
Hamad bin Abdullah took on a fight with the British after he bought a Baluchi girl from Muscat, breaking the embargo on slave trading. The British Political Resident, Francis Bellville Prideaux, decided to enforce the rules and, in April 1925, he anchored off Fujairah in the RIMS Lawrence and raised the Resident’s flag – the signal for a Trucial ruler to come aboard for talks. Hamad refused the invitation and demanded a letter of safe conduct, which was issued. On Hamad again refusing to board the Lawrence, Prideaux bombarded Fujairah fort, destroying three of the fort’s towers and killing Hamad’s daughter-in-law. Hamad bin Abdullah blamed Saeed bin Hamad Al Qasimi, the Al Qasimi Wali of Kalba for having incited the British bombardment and the mutual antagonism between them boiled over in May 1926.

The strained relations between Fujairah and the Sharjah dependencies of Kalba and Khor Fakkan now broke out into open warfare, despite Hamad bin Abdullah having married the daughter of Saeed bin Hamad Al Qasimi. Open fighting continued for the following three years and broke out again in 1927.

Sheikh Hamad bin Abdullah Al Sharqi died in the mid-1930s and was succeeded by his son, Saif bin Hamad Al Sharqi.
