= Hamad bin Mohammed Al Sharqi =

Ruler of the Emirate of Fujairah

Ruler of Fujairah
- Reign: 18 September 1974 – present
- Predecessor: Mohammed bin Hamad Al Sharqi
- Heir apparent: Mohammed bin Hamad Al Sharqi

Minister of Agriculture and Fisheries
- In office 9 December 1971 – 18 September 1974
- President: Zayed bin Sultan Al Nahyan
- Prime Minister: Maktoum Bin Rashid Al Maktoum
- Preceded by: Position established
- Succeeded by: Saeed Mohammed Al Raqbani
- Born: 22 February 1949 (age 77); Fujairah, Trucial States
- Spouse: Fatima bint Thani Al Maktoum (m. 1984)
- Issue: Sheikha Sara Al Sharqi; Sheikh Mohammed Al Sharqi; Sheikh Rashid Al Sharqi; Sheikha Shamsa Al Sharqi; Sheikha Madiya Al Sharqi; Sheikh Maktoum Al Sharqi
Names
- Sheikh Hamad bin Mohammed bin Hamad bin Abdullah Al Sharqi
- House: Al Sharqi
- Father: Mohammed bin Hamad Al Sharqi
- Mother: Fatima bint Rashid Al Nuaimi
- Religion: Islam

Styles of Ruler of Fujairah
- Reference style: His Highness
- Spoken style: Your Highness

Sheikh Hamad bin Mohammed Al Sharqi (Arabic: حمد بن محمد الشرقي, romanized: Ḥamad bin Muḥammad al-Sharqī; born 22 February 1949) is an Emirati royal and politician who is the ruler of the Emirate of Fujairah, and was the first minister of agriculture and fisheries in the United Arab Emirates between 1971 and 1974.

== Biography ==
Hamad Al Sharqi was born in 1949, the son of Sheikh Mohammed bin Hamad Al Sharqi, former ruler of the Emirate of Fujairah, one of the principalities which make up the United Arab Emirates. His mother, Sheikha Fatima bint Rashid Al Nuaimi, was a princess of the neighbouring Emirate of Ajman; she was the sister of the present ruler of Ajman, Sheikh Humaid bin Rashid Al Nuaimi.

Hamad Mohammed Al Sharqi studied Arabic at Eastbourne School of English in East Sussex, United Kingdom, from 1969 to 1970. He attended the Mons Officer Cadet School in 1970. From 1971 to 1974, he served as Minister for Agriculture and Fisheries of the UAE.

In 1974, Sheikh Hamad succeeded his father to the throne of Fujairah after his father's death. Sheikh Hamad is fluent in both English and Arabic, due to his education in a British school. He frequently acts as representative of the UAE in international seminars and conferences due to his language skills and good standing with the ruling families of Abu Dhabi, Dubai, and Ajman. Sheikh Hamad has represented the president of the United Arab Emirates the most in international seminars and conferences.

The Sharqi family have good relations with the Al Nahyan family, which rules Abu Dhabi, a relationship affirmed through marriage alliances. They also have similar relations with the Dubai ruling family. These are very old relations, rooted in history and forged over hundreds of years, dating back to the time when they were all part of the Al Hinawi tribal alliance, ranged against the Al Ghuwafir alliance. The family's relationship with Ajman is evident in the fact that the Sheikh's mother was a sister of the ruler of Ajman. Sheikh Hamad was bereaved by the death of his mother in 2014.

Sheikh Hamad is married to Sheikha Fatima bint Thani Al Maktoum, a member of the Al Maktoum family, which rules Dubai. They have the following children:

- Sara bint Hamad bin Mohammed Al Sharqi (1985) Graduate of the American University of Sharjah.
- Mohammed bin Hamad bin Mohammed Al Sharqi (born 1986), Crown Prince of Fujairah.
- Rashid bin Hamad bin Mohammed Al Sharqi (1987), head of media department of Fujairah. PhD in economics from London.
- Shamsa bint Hamad bin Mohammed Al Sharqi (1988), a graduate of Zayed University, Dubai. Head of various charities in Fujairah.
- Madiyah bint Hamad bin Mohammed Al Sharqi (1989), fashion designer.
- Maktoum bin Hamad bin Mohammed Al Sharqi (1991), a graduate of Royal Military Academy Sandhurst.

== See also ==
- Arab International Media Services
