= Wadi Abadilah =

- Location within United Arab Emirates
- Coordinates: 25°26′18″N 56°11′29″E
- Country: United Arab Emirates
- Emirate: Fujairah
- Elevation: 255 m (837 ft)

Wadi Abadilah is a wadi in Fujairah, United Arab Emirates, which runs North East towards the coast at Dibba. At Masafi, it forms a confluence with the Wadi Ham, which runs South East towards Fujairah City.

== See also ==
- List of wadis of the United Arab Emirates
