= Al Bithnah Fort =

18th-century Emirati fortification in Fujairah

Bithnah Fort
- Near Bithnah in Fujairah, United Arab Emirates
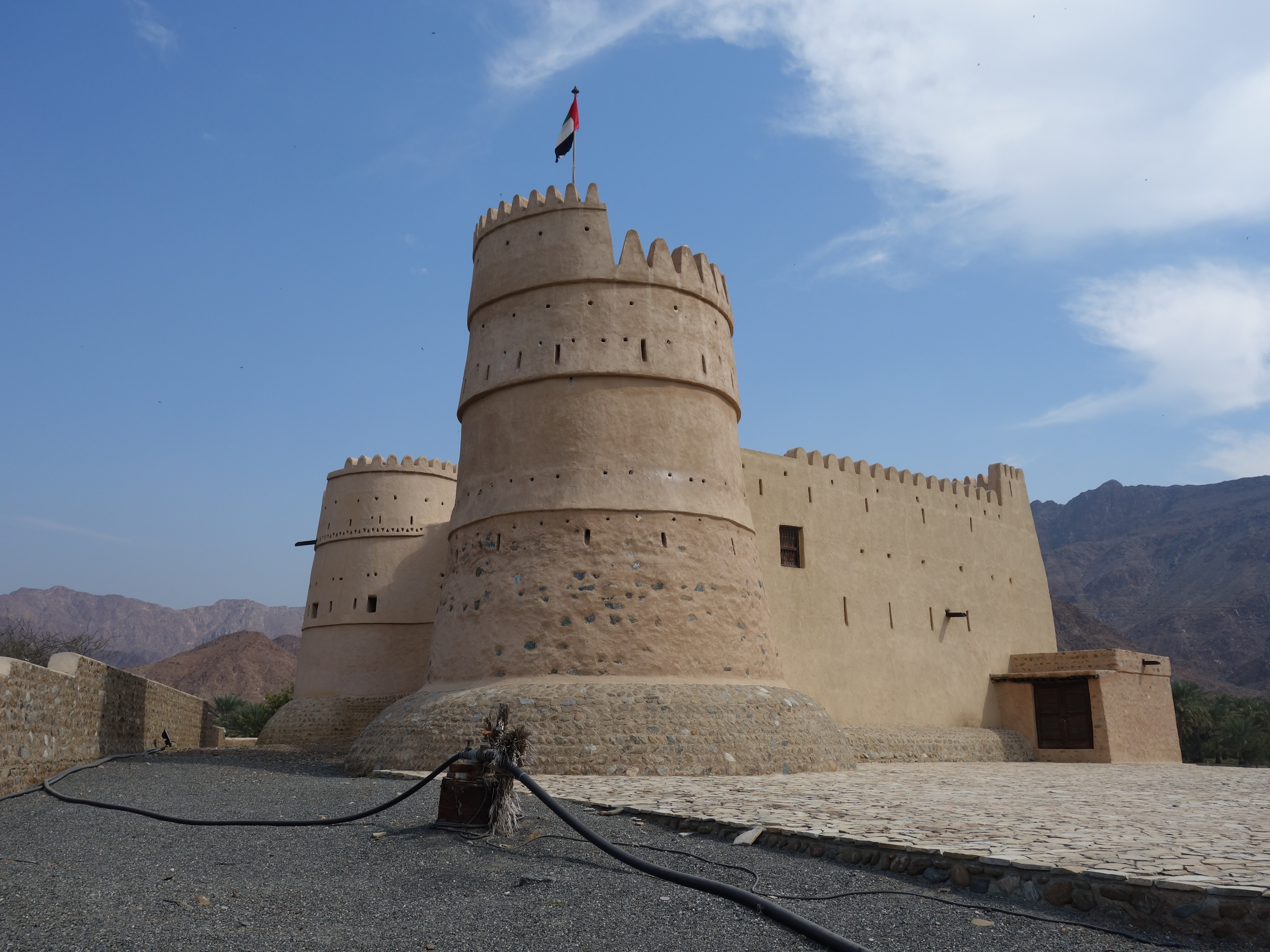

Site information
- Condition: Restored 2008

Location
- Location within United Arab Emirates
- Coordinates: 25°11′20″N 56°13′58″E

Site history
- Built: 1745-1800
- Materials: Rock, adobe, mud brick
- Battles/wars: Battle of Bithnah, 1845 Taken by Sharqiyin 1884

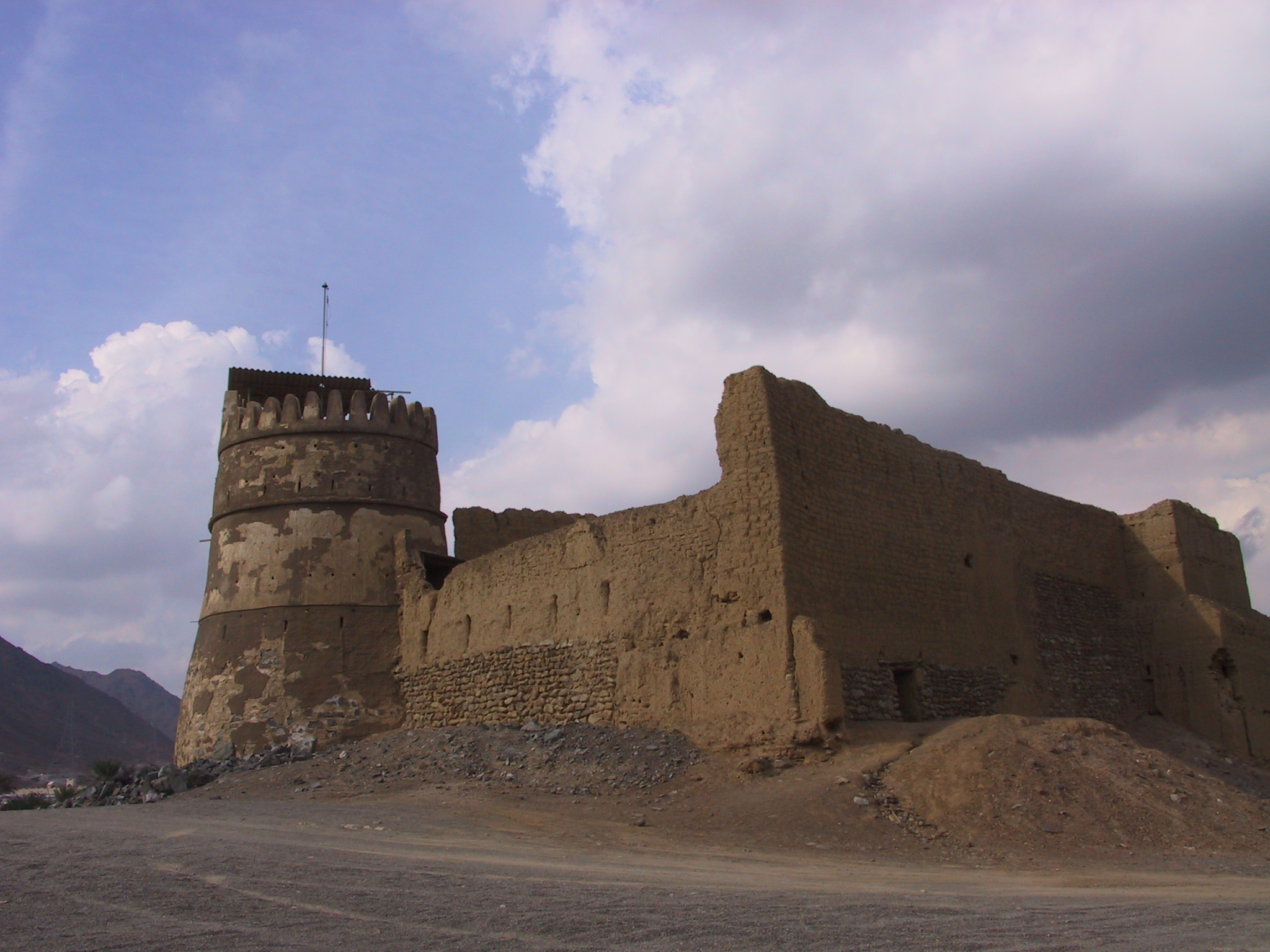
Bithnah Fort prior to restoration

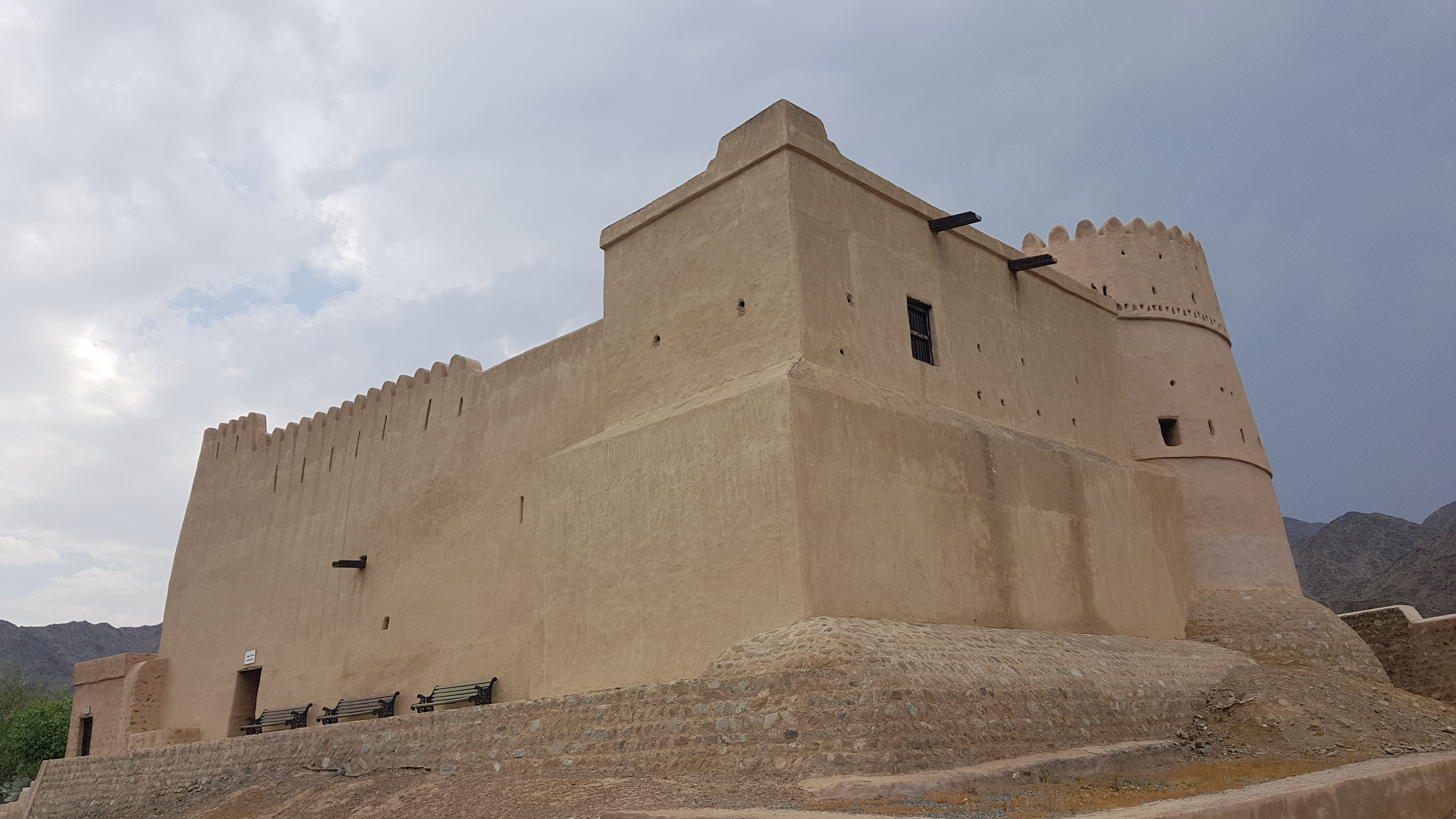
The square guard tower of Bithnah Fort, facing away from the Wadi Ham.

Bithnah Fort is a traditional double story rock, coral and mudbrick fortification located in the Wadi Ham, near the village of Bithnah in Fujairah, United Arab Emirates. The fort has played a significant role in the history of the Emirates, particularly in the emergence of Fujairah as an independent emirate in the early 20th century. With a controlling position overlooking the Wadi Ham, the fort replaced an Iron Age fortification.

Prior to the construction of the metalled road between Fujairah City and Masafi in the 1970s, traffic to the interior from the coast passed through the bed of the wadi, controlled by Bithnah Fort, which has through the ages been a keenly contested strategic holding and was to form a key mainstay in the fortunes of the Sharqiyin through the 18th and early 19th centuries.

== The fort ==
Bithnah Fort is a rectangular construction with two round corner towers. A rectangular guard's room gives the outward appearance of forming a third tower. It is principally constructed of stone walls, topped with mudbricks bound and covered in mud-based mortar. Wood joists and ceiling beams are made principally from date palm planks, although sparing use of hardwood was also made. The entrance, to the eastern wall of the fort, leads to a 3.3 metre corridor covered with hardwood slabs. This narrow entrance leads, in turn, to a subterranean room and then, via a ladder, to the courtyard. Restoration work in 2008 revealed traces of this room being used as a madbasa, a date storage room with channelled floors to collect the date juice, or dhibs.

Although the fort is known to have been in existence by 1808 (it was possessed at that time by Saudi Wahhabi forces), it is thought the fort could have been constructed at any time following 1745. Traditional repairs to the fort have been made using mud-based renders.

Bithnah Fort was to preside over a century of conflict between the tribes of the west coast and interior against Muscat, with the outside forces of Wahhabi Saudi Arabia and Persia often becoming involved as alliances shifted and military forces found success or failure. Its eventual fall to the insurgent Sharqiyin of Fujairah was to cement the independence of Fujairah from rule both by Muscat and the Qawasim.

== 1745 Battle of Bithnah ==
Bithnah occupies a strategic location in the Wadi Ham, which links the East Coast port of Fujairah to the inland town of Masafi and stands as one of the three great trade routes (the others are the Wadi Jizzi and the Wadi Hatta) through to the interior and western ports of the Southern Arabian Peninsula. As such, it has long been a flashpoint in the region's conflicts, not least of which was that between the Qawasim of Sharjah and Ras Al Khaimah and the Na'im of Buraimi ranged against the Saidi Sultan of Muscat. In 1745, the Qawasim together with the Na’im attempted to fight their way through the Wadi Ham to take the east coast and its great prize, the port of Sohar. They met the Saidi forces at Bithnah and the Battle of Bithnah ensued, a conflict that was to mark a new era in the history of the area: the drawn-out battle between the Saidi Omani leader Ahmed bin Said Al Busaidi against the Qawasim of Ras Al Khaimah and Sharjah, and other tribes of the West coast and interior. The Battle of Bithnah was won by the Qawasim when the troops of Ahmed bin Said deserted him.

The conflict rumbled on until, in 1762, a newly resurgent Ahmed bin Said (he had by now unified the querulous Omani tribes) blockaded Julfar, while the Qawasim moved against Rustaq. These raids across the mountains continued until 1792, when a great raid took place by the Na’im of Buraimi against Sohar, resulting in the fall of the city to the raiders. Reinforced by the Bani Yas of Dubai (under their Ruler, Hazza) and the Bani Qitab, the Na’im were however defeated, retreating down the Wadi Jizzi to Buraimi. Ahmed bin Said's forces, triumphant, also sacked the important port town of Dibba by sea, killing many members of the Naqbiyin and Sharqiyin tribes.

== Bithnah contested ==
The Qawasim found a new ally against their traditional enemy in Oman when the Saudis established a presence in Buraimi, zealous with the new message of their Wahhabi faith. Although there had been a brief alliance between the two enemies, the fragmentation once more of Omani authority resulted in the Qawasim taking sides and backing the Omani Said, Badr bin Saif Al Busaidi. As a result, the important eastern port of Khor Fakkan fell to the Qawasim, backed by Saudi forces. However, when the Qawasim Sheikh, Sultan bin Saqr Al Qasimi, resisted Saudi dominance and pressure to harry shipping in the Gulf, he was removed from power and control over the forts of Fujairah, Bithnah and Khor Fakkan was placed in the hands of Saudi-backed forces. By 1809, the Saudis had appointed walis, or officers, over the whole Qawasim territory.

Sultan bin Saqr Al Qasimi escaped Saudi captivity in Diriyah and fled to Mocha and then on to Muscat, where he was received by his former foe, the Said bin Sultan Al Busaidi. His arrival coincided with growing exasperation on the part of Oman's ally, the British, with the Qawasim of Ras Al Khaimah and their constant raids on Omani and other locally flagged shipping. Giving the British further casus belli, Sultan's presence at Muscat helped to inspire the 1809 Persian Gulf Campaign against the Qawasim at Ras Al Khaimah. The action, although punitive, was to be indecisive.

In 1813, an expedition by the Sultan of Muscat to Ras Al Khaimah with the objective of restoring Sultan bin Saqr failed. However, a further sally the next year saw Sultan once again installed as Ruler not of Ras Al Khaimah, but of Sharjah and Lingeh, the latter being his principle residence. Ras Al Khaimah remained under the effective rule of the Saudi dependent, Hassan bin Rahmah. However, the 1819 Persian Gulf Campaign proved altogether more decisive and restored Sultan bin Saqr to rule of the Qawasim.

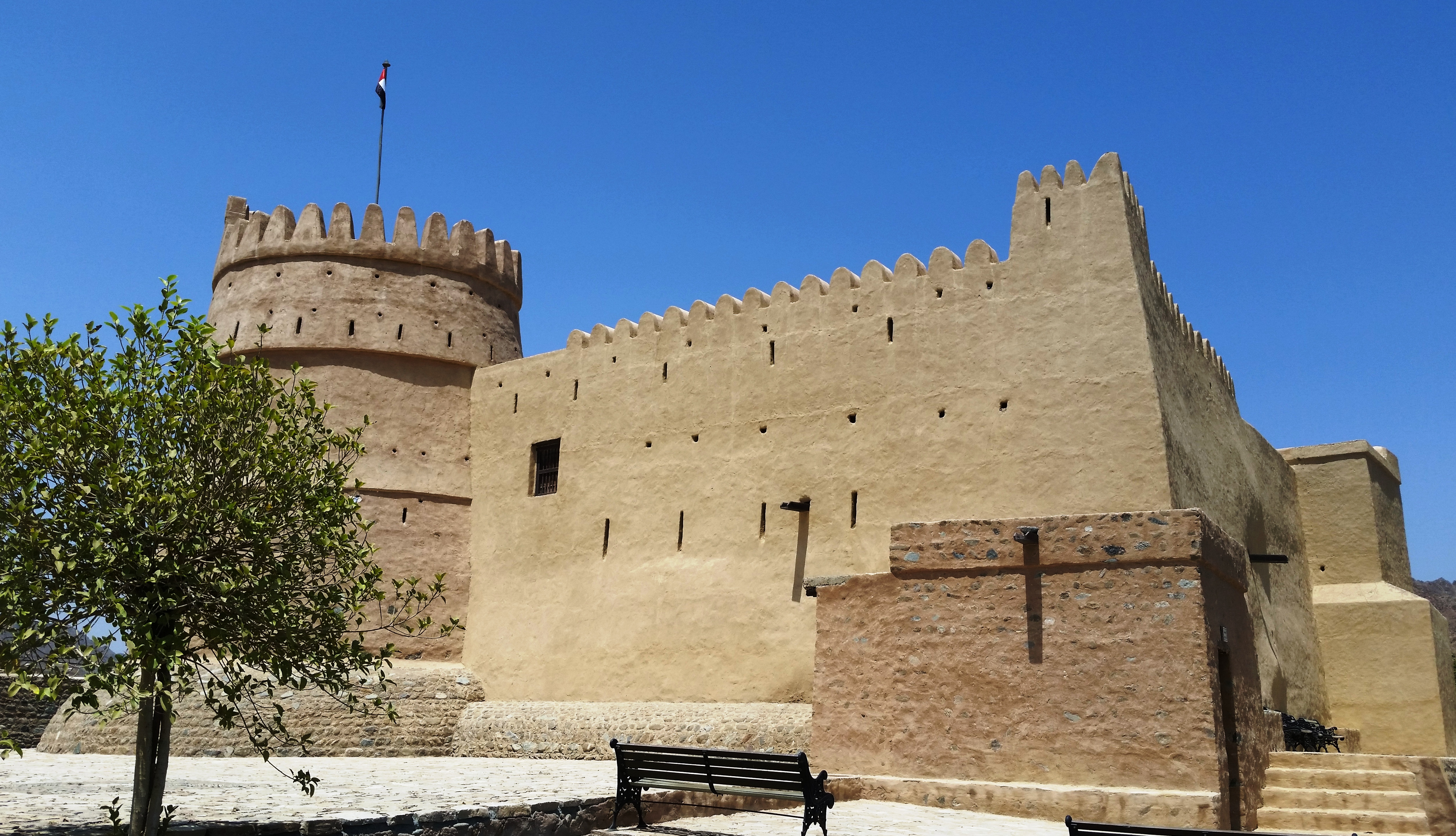
Bithnah Fort, showing the square guard tower to the right.

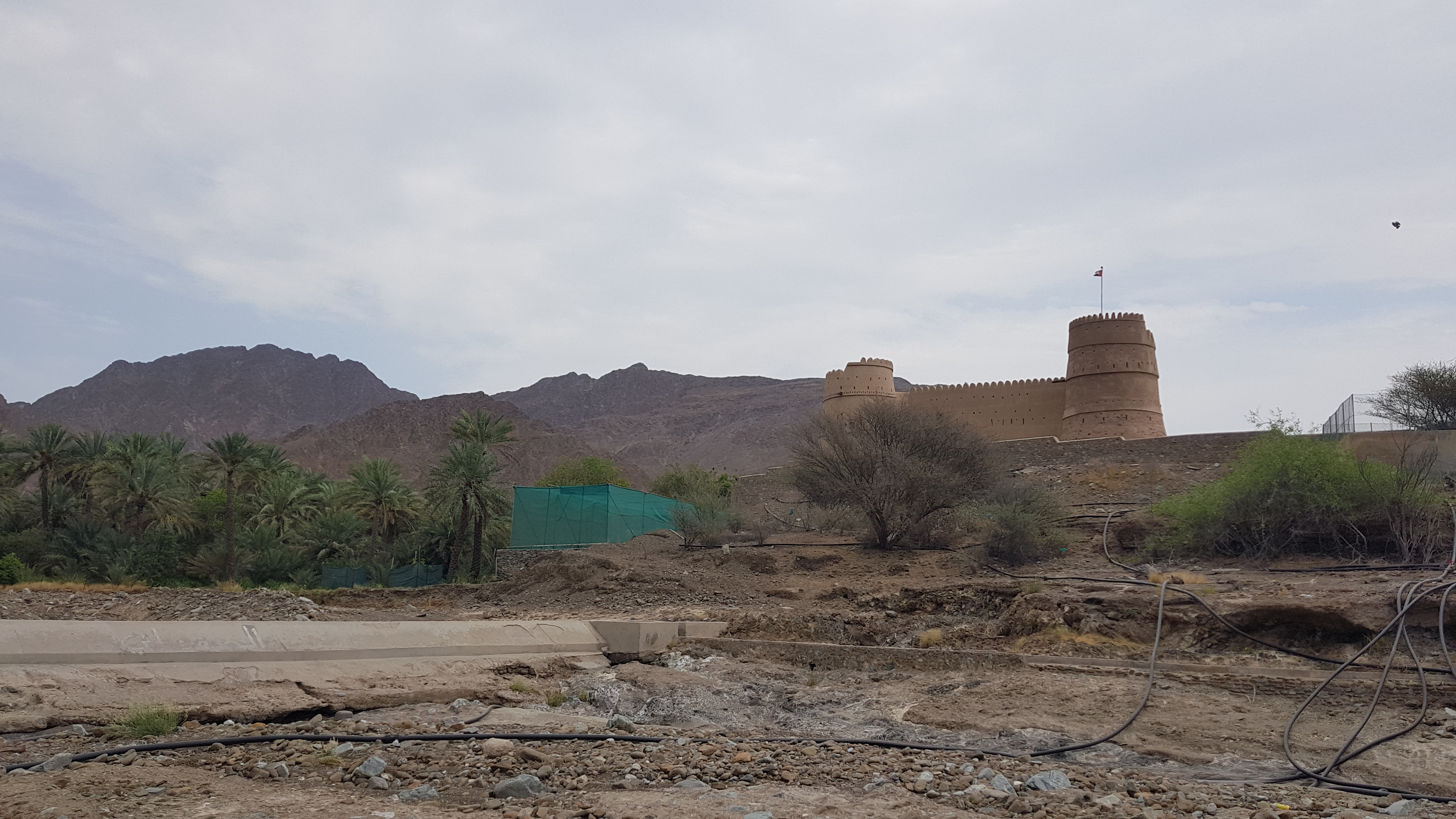
Bithnah Fort viewed from the Wadi Ham.

Sultan bin Saqr signed the General Maritime Treaty of 1820 on the 4 February 1820 at Falayah Fort inland of Ras Al Khaimah as 'Sheikh of Sharjah and Ras Al Khaimah'. Hassan bin Rahmah had earlier signed a preliminary agreement giving up control of Ras Al Khaimah to the British and subsequently signed the 1820 treaty as 'Sheikh of Khatt and Falaiha, formerly of Ras Al Khaimah'.

Focused on consolidating his rule over the west coast and rebuilding the shattered town of Ras Al Khaimah, in 1850 Sultan Bin Saqr Al Qasimi ended the long-running conflict with Muscat when he agreed a compromise with the Sultan of Muscat in which Al Qasimi rule was accepted over the area north of the line between Sharjah and Khor Kalba on the East coast, but excluding the rough, high land North of the line between Sha'am on the West and Dibba on the East coast. This effectively saw Muscat cede the Shamaliyah to Sharjah, recognising Sultan bin Saq's de facto rule over the area.

== Sharqiyin independence ==
After over a century of contested ownership of the east coast, or Shamaliyah, it was nominally under Qawasim control as Sultan bin Saqr consolidated his rule. However, the influence of the Qawasim was weakened following Sultan bin Saqr's death in 1866, his successor killed in single combat by Zayed the Great of Abu Dhabi. By the 1880s, a number of Qawasim dependencies threatened independence from Saqr bin Khalid Al Qasimi and the head man of Fujairah town, Sheikh Hamad bin Abdullah Al Sharqi, took the opportunity to lead an insurrection in Spring 1879 against Sheikh Salim bin Sultan Al Qasimi of Sharjah, who had placed a slave named Sarur in charge of Fujairah. After his delegation to Salim bin Sultan was rebuffed, Hamad bin Abdullah led a successful sally against Fujairah Fort, leading to a rout.

=== Rebellion ===
In 1884, Hamad bin Abdullah took Bithnah Fort, taking control of the sole route from the interior to the Shamaliyah. Saqr bin Khalid chose not to act against the rebels, as indeed the Sultan Turki bin Said of Muscat elected not to offer them protection after they appealed to him to assume suzerainty over them. British advice to the Sultan was not to get embroiled in what would ultimately lead to an inevitable clash with Sharjah. Muscat stayed away and Saqr bin Khalid lost effective control over the whole of the east coast Al Qasimi possessions, from Dibba down to Kalba. Control over the coastal trading town of Khor Fakkan, which could only be reached by land through Fujairah or Dibba at the time, was thereby lost.

Holding the strategic asset of Al Bithnah Fort enabled Hamad bin Abdullah to refuse the Ruler of Sharjah at the time, Sheikh Saqr Bin Khalid Al Qasimi, access to send aid to the beleaguered headman of Kalba. This event sealed the de facto independence of Fujairah which was not, however, recognised by the British until 1952.

The dispute at Kalba flared up and each side gathered its backers. In April 1902, Saqr bin Khalid gathered a force of 250 mounted Bedouin to attack Fujairah, while Hamad bin Abdullah petitioned Dubai and Ajman as well as the Sultan of Muscat for their help. The British caught wind of the impending conflict and intervened, warning Muscat and Dubai to stand down. Attempting to mediate the dispute in Sharjah, the British Residency Agent found both Saqr bin Khalid protesting that he could not control his Bedouin and Hamad bin Abdullah refusing to recognise a safe pass to Sharjah as legitimate.

In November, repenting of his conciliatory attitude, Saqr bin Khalid had two Fujairah men killed on their way to Ajman, escalating the conflict with Hamad bin Abdullah. The next month, the British Political Resident, Gaskin, travelled to Sharjah and then on to Fujairah in the RIMS Lawrence. Following two days of negotiations between the warring parties, the British gave up their attempt at intervention and left, cautioning both parties not to break the Maritime Peace.

=== Independence ===
Declaring his independence in 1901, Sheikh Hamad enjoyed the recognition of this status by all concerned, with the sole exception of the British.

In 1903, the British once again decided not to recognise Fujairah but to consider it a dependency of Sharjah. Despite a sally by Saqr bin Khalid Al Qasimi against Bithnah Fort early in the year, an attempt to regain control of the strategic Wadi Ham, and an exhortation to peace by Curzon during his 1903 vice regal Durbar, Fujairah remained a nominal dependency at best and in 1906 was claimed as a dependency of Abu Dhabi, with no opposition from Sharjah.

== A Trucial State ==
In 1939, Mohammed bin Hamad Al Sharqi succeeded as Sheikh of Fujairah. He consolidated the Sharqiyin holdings of Fujairah and its surroundings and by 1950, he had won over Dibba to the North, as well as the coastal settlements of Bidayah and Sakamkam and the inland village of Bithnah and the strategically located Bithnah Fort.

This considerably strengthened his hand when, in 1952, the British (who had staunchly refused recognition of Fujairah's independence over the past 50 years) opened negotiations with Mohammed bin Hamad for oil exploration concessions for British company PCL, Petroleum Concessions Limited. The British government granted Mohammed bin Hamad recognition as a Trucial Ruler and he acceded in 1952 as the Ruler of the seventh emirate to be so recognised (Kalba, previously recognised as a Trucial State in 1939, was subsumed back into Sharjah in 1951).

=== Collapse ===
The Bithnah Fort was allowed to collapse into a ruined state over the course of Mohammed bin Hamad's rule, with both towers falling in. Restored in 1974, it was allowed once again to lapse into a state of decay and, by 2006, was in a parlous state. It was restored fully in 2008–2012.

Prior to 2009, the fort was inhabited by a local man from Bithnah, Saed Ali Saed Al Yamahi.
