= Al Sharqi =

Ruling royal family of Fujairah, UAE

- Royal house
- Parent house: Nizari or Adnani tribe; Bedouin tribe; Ghafiri tribe; Sharqiyin tribe; Hafaitat
- Country: United Arab Emirates
- Founded: 1879; 147 years ago
- Founder: Hamad bin Abdullah Al Sharqi
- Current head: Hamad bin Mohammed Al Sharqi
- Titles: Emir; Sheikh
- Style: His/Her Highness

The Al Sharqi (Arabic: ال شرقي) family is the ruling royal family of Fujairah, one of the seven emirates that together comprise the United Arab Emirates (UAE).

== Founding Fujairah ==
The name derives from the singular of Sharqiyin, long the dominant (traditionally Ghafiri) tribe along the North East coast of the Trucial States (and the second most numerous in the area around the start of the 19th century), an area known as Shamaliyah. The Sharqiyin were originally dependents of Sharjah and, over the centuries, made several attempts to secede and declare independence, finally practically managing this from 1901 onwards and finally gaining British recognition as a Trucial State in 1952.

== List of Al Sharqi rulers ==
- 1879–1936: Hamad bin Abdullah Al Sharqi
- 1936–1938: Saif bin Hamad Al Sharqi
- 1938–1975: Mohammed bin Hamad Al Sharqi
- 1975–present: Hamad bin Mohammed Al Sharqi
