= Wadi Ham =

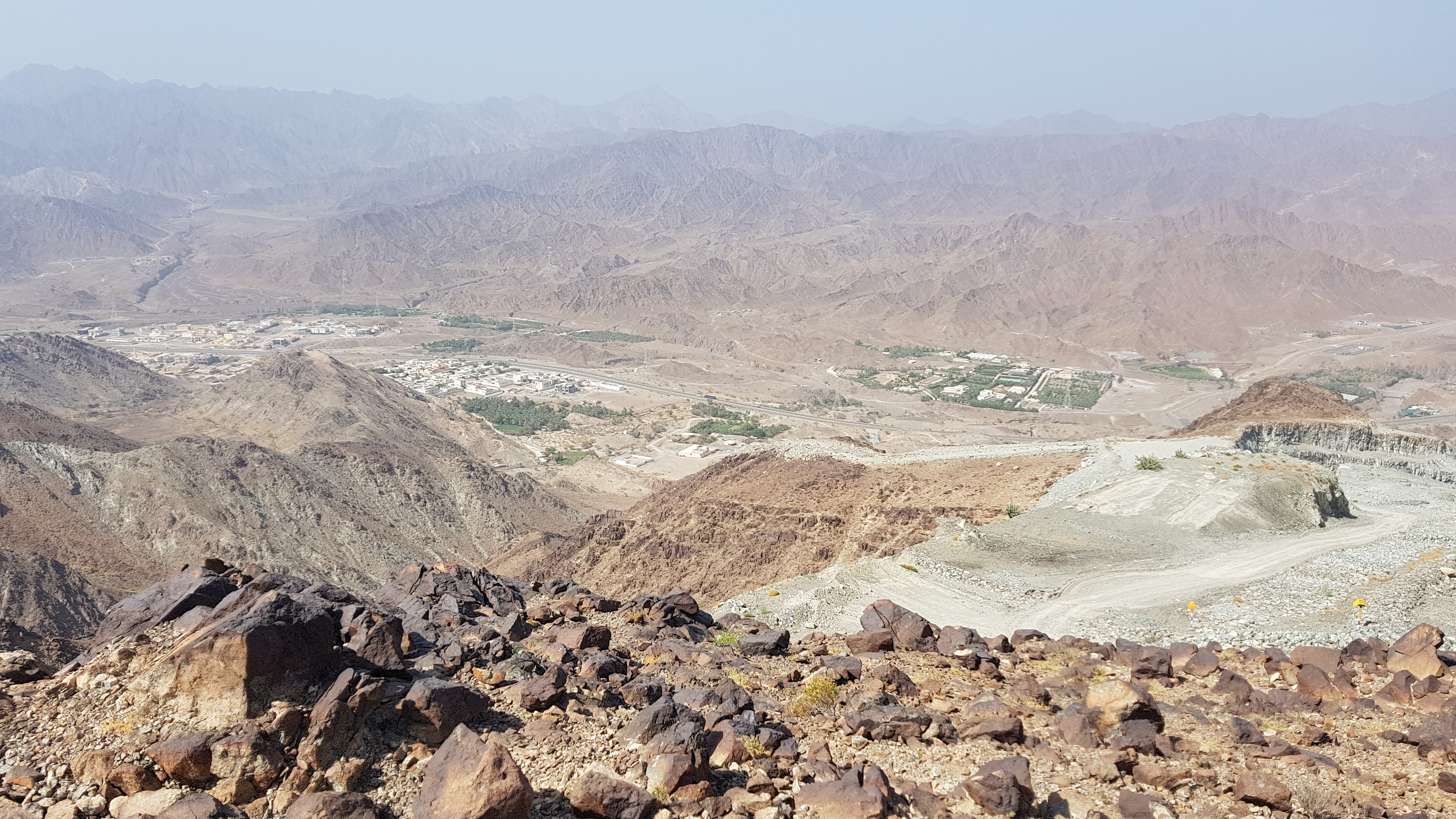

- Location within United Arab Emirates

Physical characteristics
- Mouth
  - coordinates: 25°07′42.5″N 56°21′27.7″E

Wadi Ham is a wadi, a seasonal watercourse, in the Hajar Mountains of Fujairah and Ras Al Khaimah, United Arab Emirates.

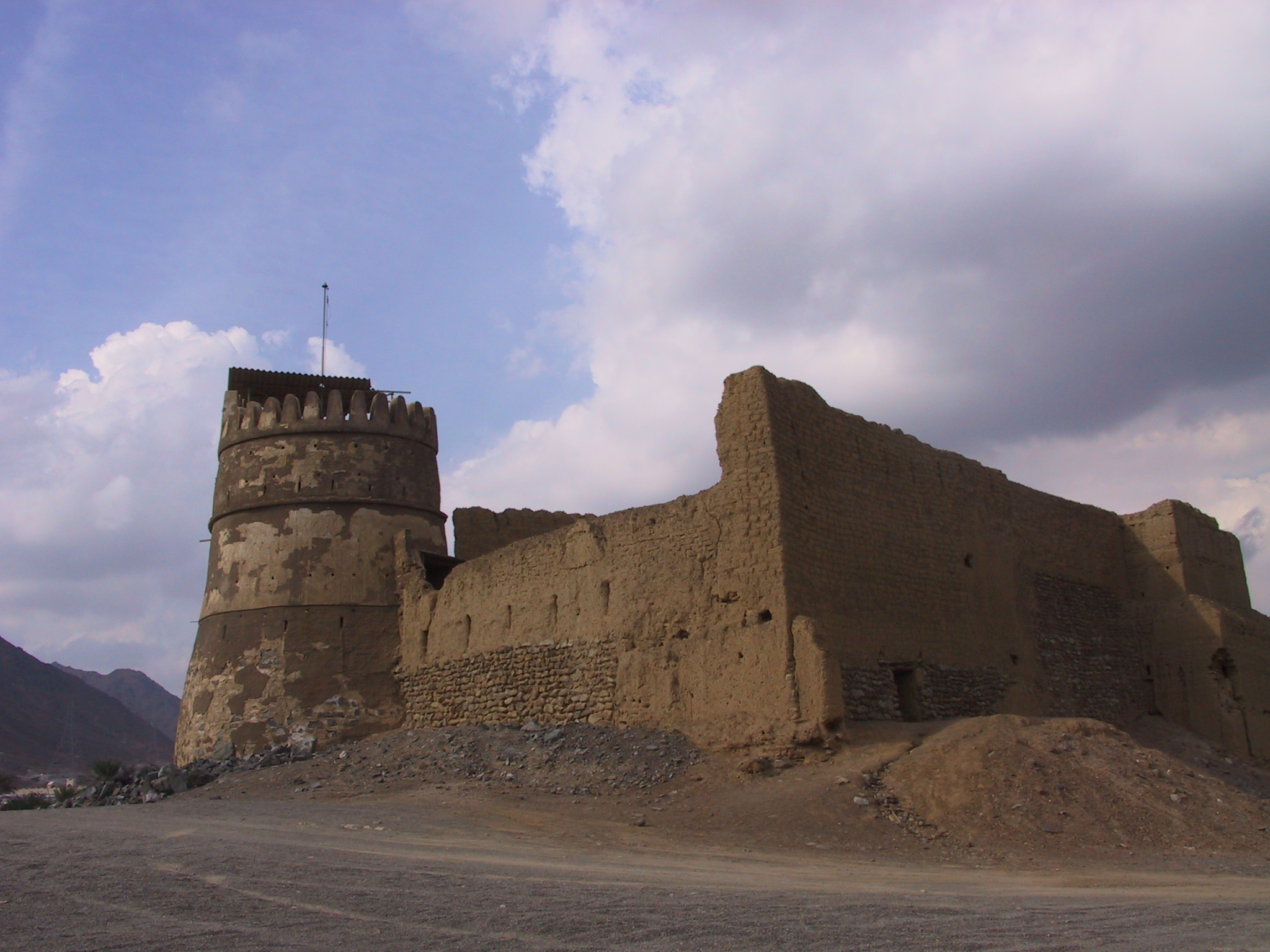
Bithnah Fort on the route of the Wadi Ham

The main wadi runs from Masafi towards Fujairah City, until it reaches the Wadi Ham Dam and the Gulf of Oman. The wadi is crossed by the Sharjah/Khor Fakkan road north of the village of Daftah, which is in Ras Al Khaimah and traditionally Mazari. The Fujairah village of Al Bithnah and its strategically important fort, Al Bithnah Fort, is on the route. With a total length of some 35 miles, the head of the wadi is in the Jiri Plain near to Adhen.

The E 89 Sheikh Maktoum Bin Rashid Al Maktoum Road runs along the length of the wadi between Masafi and Fujairah City. A proposed Etihad Rail line is also planned to run along this route.

At Masafi, the Wadi Ham joins the Wadi Abadilah, which runs down to the town of Dibba Al Hisn on the East Coast of the UAE, making Masafi the central point on a crescent-shaped, contiguous waterway that transects the Hajar Mountains.

Like many wadis in the Emirates, Wadi Ham has experienced salt water intrusions in the lower, coastal, part of the wadi, which has affected coastal agricultural systems.

== See also ==
- List of wadis of the United Arab Emirates
