= Abu Dhabi bus service =

Public bus Service

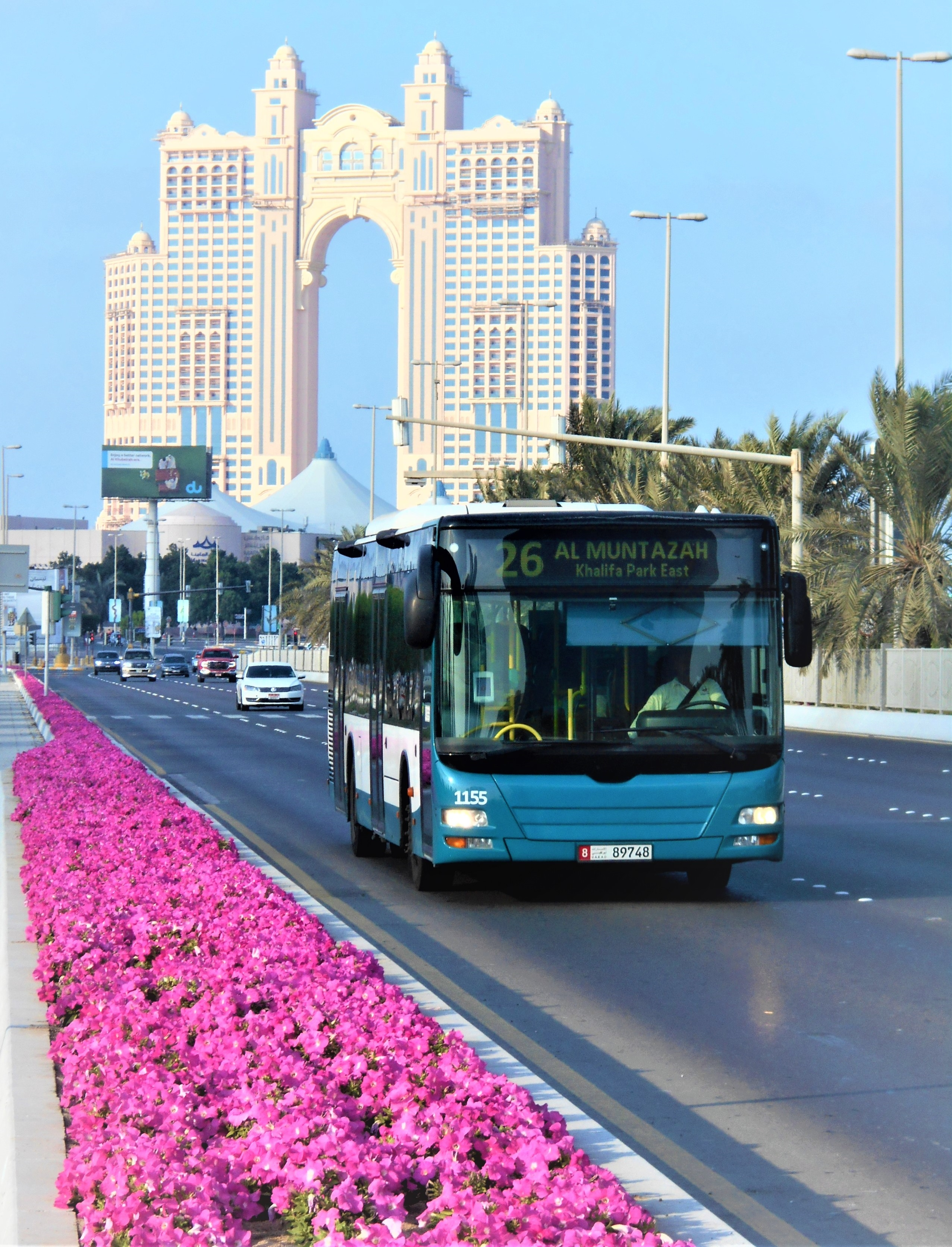
- Parent: Integrated Transport Centre
- Commenced operation: 2008
- Service area: Abu Dhabi City, Al Ain City, Western Region
- Depots: ITC Bus Depot (Abu Dhabi City); Shahama Bus Depot (Abu Dhabi Suburbs); Al Ain Saniaya Bus Depot (Al Ain); Zayed City Bus Depot (Western Region)
- Fleet: MAN Lion's City; MAN Lion's Regio; Mercedes-Benz Citaro; Car-Bus Spica Urban; Volvo Castrosua Magnus E+

The Abu Dhabi Public Bus Service is a Public transport bus service operating in the Emirate of Abu Dhabi in the United Arab Emirates. It is operated by Abu Dhabi Mobility (Integrated Transport Centre), a division of Abu Dhabi Department of Municipalities and Transport.

The service serves the cities of Abu Dhabi, Al Ain and the western region. The service was introduced by the emirate of Abu Dhabi in 2008 with four routes, which charged Zero-fare until 2009.

== Abu Dhabi Bus Services ==
- Local Bus Services (Abu Dhabi City)
- City Express Bus Services (Abu Dhabi City)
- Limited stop bus services (Abu Dhabi City)
- Regional Bus Services (Abu Dhabi City Suburbs)
- Night Bus Services (Operates specifically at night)
- Regional Express Bus Services (Operated by Capital Express)
- Buses to Dubai (Operated by RTA)
- Eastern Region Bus Services (Al Ain and neighboring cities)
- Western Region Bus Services (Zayed City and neighboring cities)

The transportation services in Abu Dhabi are operated by MAN Lion's City, MAN Lion's Regio, Mercedes-Benz Citaro (Second Generation in Abu Dhabi city, First generation in Al Ain), Car-bus Spica Urban, Volvo B11R chassis buses with the body built by Carrocera Castrosua and certain electric and hydrogen buses (MCV C120, Yutong U12 and U18, Wisdom Motor WSD6124CL1FCEV and others) on select routes.

== Routes ==
As of June 2025:

=== Local Bus Services ===
- 005 Al Kasir Marina Mall to Al Zahiyah Bus Station
- 007 Al Kasir Marina Mall to Al Zahiyah Al Falah St
- 008 Marina Al Bateen to Zayed Port Fish Market
- 009 Al Kasir Marina Mall to Zayed Port Cruise Terminal
- 011 Al Kasir Marina Mall to Zayed Port 42 Abu Dhabi
- 023 Al Bateen Sheika Fatima Park to Rabdan Maqtaa Mall
- 024 Al Kasir Marina Mall to Al Rawdah Zayed Grand Mosque
- 026 Al Kasir Marina Mall to Al Muntazah Khalifa Park East
- 033 Al Rawdah ADNEC to Al Bateen Sheika Fatima Park
- 034 Al Ras Al Akhdar Qasr Al Watan to Al Rawdah Abu Dhabi Courts
- 040 Al Maryah Island to Al Muntazah South
- 041 Al Rawdah ADNEC to Al Zahiyah Corniche Hospital
- 042 Al Rawdah Abu Dhabi Courts to Al Maryah Island
- 043 Al Mushrif Coop via Al Mushrif Mall to Al Zahiyah Corniche Hospital
- 044 Al Muzoun Armed Forces Officers Club to Zayed Port Cruise Terminal
- 045 Al Nahyan Abu Dhabi Bus Station to Al Nahyan Abu Dhabi Bus Station via *Evangelical Community Church, Saint Anthony Cathedral for Coptic Orthodox *Church (Only Saturday and Sunday)
- 054 Zayed Port Fish Market to Sas Al Nakhl Khalifa University
- 055 Al Muntazah South to Al Zahiyah Corniche Hospital
- 056 Zayed Port Al Mina Centre to Al Muntazah Khalifa Park East
- 063 Al Kasir Marina Mall to Al Reem Reem Mall
- 065 Al Reem City of Lights to Al Kasir Marina Mall
- 067 Al Kasir Marina Mall to Al Reem Shams Abu Dhabi
- 069 Al Kasir Marina Mall to Al Maryah Island
- 071 Al Kasir Marina Mall to Al Reem Shams Abu Dhabi
- 073 Al Reem Shams Abu Dhabi to Al Hudayriat Mar Vista
- 094 Mamsha Al Saadiyat via Louvre, Zayed Grand Mosque to Wahat Al Karama

=== City Express Bus Services ===
- X5 Rabdan Bus Interchange to Al Zahiyah Corniche Hospital via Sultan bin Zayed the First St

=== Airport Bus Services ===
- A1 Zayed Airport Terminal A to Abu Dhabi Al Zahiyah Bus Station
- A2 Zayed Airport Terminal A to Abu Dhabi Khalifa Street
- A10 Zayed Airport Terminal A to MBZ City Bus Station
- A40 Al Shahama Bus Station to Baniyas West Bus Station via Zayed Airport Terminal A

=== Limited Stop Bus Services ===
- L41 Al Rawdah ADNEC to Al Zahiyah Corniche Hospital
- L42 Rabdan Bus Interchange to Al Maryah Island
- L43 Rabdan Souq Qaryat Al Beri to Al Zahiyah Bus Station

=== Night Bus Services (11PM-5AM) ===
- N2 Abu Dhabi Airport ECC to Abu Dhabi Al Zahiyah Bus Station
- N41 Al Rawdah ADNEC to Al Zahiyah Corniche Hospital
- N43 Rabdan Souq Qaryat Al Beri to Al Zahiyah Corniche Hospital

=== Regional Bus Services ===
- 101 Mussafah Dalma Mall to Al Reef Downtown via Abu Dhabi
- 102 Yas Island Yas Hotel Plaza to MBZ City Bus Station via Abu Dhabi
- 103 Abu Dhabi Capital Park to MBZ City ADVETI
- 110 Abu Dhabi Capital Park to Mussafah NPCC via ICAD
- 111 Abu Dhabi Capital Park to Mussafah St 14 via Worker Village
- 120 MBZ City Mazyad Mall to Al Saadiyat Public Beach via Abu Dhabi
- 121 MBZ City Mazyad Mall to Hidd Al Saadiyat via Abu Dhabi
- 125 Abu Dhabi Bus Station to Al Saadiyat Public Beach
- 127 Abu Dhabi Bus Station to Hidd Al Saadiyat
- 155 Abu Dhabi Capital Park to Shakhbout City ADNOC
- 160 Abu Dhabi Capital Park to Khalifa City Souq
- 161 Al Khalidiyah Children Garden to Khalifa City Souq
- 170 Al Saadiyat New York University to Al Raha Beach Al Zeina via Abu Dhabi
- 175 Al Khalidiyah Children Garden to Al Raha Beach Al Zeina
- 184 Abu Dhabi Bus Station to Yas Island IKEA via Saadiyat Island and Jubail Mangrove Park
- 187 Al Zahiyah Bus Station to Yas Island, Yas Mall
- 201 Abu Dhabi Central Bus Station to Al Bahyah Souq (Al Shahama Bus Station)
- 202 Abu Dhabi Central Bus Station to Al Rahba Hospital
- 203 Abu Dhabi Central Bus Station to Abu Mreikhah, BAPS Temple (Saturday and Sunday only)
- 210 Mussafah Dalma Mall to Al Shahama Bus Station
- 216 Al Shahama Bus Station to MBZ City Mazyad Mall via Yas Island, Khalifa City
- 221 Al Samhah East to Al Bahyah Souq
- 222 Al Shahama, Al Mughayyir St to Al Samhah, Hili St / Souq
- 223 Al Shahama Bus Station to Al Shahama Bus Station via Abu Mreikhah, BAPS Temple
- 225 Al Sadar Shipyard to Al Bahya Deerfield Mall
- 227 Al Shahama Bus Station to Zayed Military City Sweihan Prison (Mon to Fri)
- 228 Al Shahama Bus Station to Zayed Military City Tawazun (Sat and Sun)
- 300 Abu Dhabi to Al Shamkhah Makani Mall
- 401 Al Rawdah Zayed Grand Mosque to Baniyas Souq
- 404 Abu Dhabi Capital Park to Al Nahdah Al Wathba Municipality
- 405 Abu Dhabi Capital Park to Al Nahdah Al Wathba Municipality
- 407 Abu Dhabi Al Zahiyah Bus Station to Jarn Yafour Workers City
- 408 Abu Dhabi Central Bus Station to Al Wathba South, Sheikh Zayed Festival (Only during the period Sheikh Zayed Festival is open)
- 410 Mussafah Port to Jarn Yafour Workers City
- 420 Shakhbout ADNOC to Jarn Yafour Workers City
- B45 Al Wathba Prison to Baniyas Bawabat Al Sharq Mall
- B46 New Al Wathba mosque to Al Shawamekh South mosque
- B47 Al Wathba mosque to Shakhbout City Fatima College
- F1 Al Shamkha Makani Mall to Al Reef Downtown via Al Falah
- K2 Khalifa City Souq to Khalifa City Souq via Ministry of Education
- K3 Khalifa City Al Rayyana to Masdar City MBZUAI
- K4 Khalifa City Al Fursan to Zayed International Airport T2
- M1 MBZ Mazyad Mall to MBZ Mazyad Mall via ICAD and Al Naseela St
- M2 MBZ Mazyad Mall to ICAD Residential City
- M3 MBZ City ADVETI to Zayed City (Abu Dhabi) Abu Dhabi University
- M4 MBZ City Mazyad Mall to Mussafah Community 12 Al Rasi St
- M5 MBZ City Mazyad Mall to MBZ City West mosque
- M9 MBZ City Mazyad Mall to MBZ City Bus Station
- Q3 Rabdan Bus Interchange to Rabdan Bus Interchange
- R1 MBZ City Bus Station to Razeen Workers City

=== Eastern Region Bus Services ===
- 540 Khattm Al Shikhla ADNOC to Al Ain Industrial City
- 550 Al Ain Central Bus Station to Al Quo'a Souq
- 900 Hili Mall to Al Noud Bawadi Mall
- 901 Hili Mall to Al Maqam West Souq
- 902 Hili Mall to Al Maqam Co-op
- 903 Hili Mall to Zakhir East Police Station
- 904 Al Ni'mah Makani Mall to Al Ameriyah Mosque
- 905 Al Tiwayyah Co-op to Shiab Al Ashkhar Al Ain Co-op
- 906 Al Ain International Airport STRATA to Mbazzarah Al Khadra Green Mubazzarah
- 907 Mazyad ADNOC to Al Maqam Co-op
- 908 Al Aamerah West Mosque to Al Noud Bawadi Mall
- 909 Ghireebah Ghoneimah Mosque to Al Noud MarThoma Church
- 911 Hili Fun City to Al Bateen West Mosque
- 912 Al Foa'a Mall to Al Maqam Co-op
- 913 Al Nayfa ADVETI to Zakhir East Police Station
- 914 Al Tiwayyah Maryam Bint Sultan School to Mbazzarah Al Khadra Co-op
- 915 Al Tiwayyah Towayyah Healthcare Centre to Ain Al Faydah Park
- 916 Zakhir Mosque to Al Salamat Co-op
- 917 Al Dhahir Grand Mosque to Al Maqam Co-op
- 918 Aliyah Al Aaliya School to Al Noud Bawadi Mall
- 919 Al Rawdah Al Sharqiyah Mosque to Al Noud MarThoma Church
- 927 Al Dhahir Community Grand Mosque to Al Maqam Co-op
- 928 Al Aamerah Souq to Al Noud Bawadi Mall
- 937 Um Ghafah Souq to Al Maqam Co-op
- 938 Al Aamerah Mosque to Al Noud Bawadi Mall
- 992 Hili Mall to Al Maqam Co-op

=== Western Region Bus Services ===
- 640 Mezaira'a Bus Station to Arrada Farms
- 651 Tamani Farms Mosque to Tamani Farms Mosque via Mezaira'a Bus Station
- 652 Mezaira'a South to Al Mariyah Farms
- 655 Mezaira'a Bus Station to Hameem Shabiya Mosque
- 660 Mezaira'a Bus Station to Madinat Zayed Bus Station
- 662 Maraba'a Al Dhafra to Madinat Zayed Al Jaber Camp via Industrial area
- 663 Madinat Zayed Baynunah Market to Sahaba Mosque
- 664 Madinat Zayed Baynunah Market to Sahaba Mosque
- 665 Madinat Zayed Camel Farms Mosque to Madinat Zayed Police Station
- 670 Madinat Zayed Bus Station to Tarif Bus Station
- 675 Madinat Zayed Bus Station to ADCO Accommodation
- 686 Madinat Zayed Bus Station to Ghayathi Bus Station
- 760 Madinat Zayed Al Dhafra Mall to Al Marfa Mirfa Souq
- 770 Tarif Bus Station to Al Taf Al Gharbi Mirfa Dates Factory
- 771 Al Harmiya Harmiya Residence to Al Taf Al Gharbi Mirfa Dates Factory
- 780 Tarif Bus Station to Al Dhannah ADNOC Bus Station
- 861 Ghayathi Bus Station to Ghayathi Farms
- 862 Ghayathi Bus Station to Bad' Al Mutaw'ah
- 863 Ghayathi South Lulu Express to Ghayathi Industrial Area
- 864 Ghayathi South Lulu Express to Ghayathi Workers City
- 880 Al Dhannah Mall to Ghayathi Souq
- 881 Al Dhannah ADWEA Saipam Camp to Jabal Al Dhannah Sir Baniyas Port
- 882 Al Dhannah Mall to Jabal Al Dhannah Sir Baniyas Port
- 883 Al Dhannah ADNOC Bus Station to Al Dhannah ADNOC Bus Station
- 884 Al Dhannah ADNOC Bus Station to Al Dhannah ADNOC Bus Station
- 890 Al Dhannah ADNOC Bus Station to Al Gweifat Border Control

=== Regional Express Bus Services (Operated by Capital Express) ===
- X60 Abu Dhabi Central Bus Station to Muzayr'ah Bus Station
- X86 Abu Dhabi Central Bus Station to Ghayathi Souq
- X88 Abu Dhabi Central Bus Station to Al Dhannah ADNOC Bus Station
- X90 Abu Dhabi Central Bus Station to Al Ain Central Bus Station

=== Buses to Dubai (Operated by RTA Dubai) ===
- E100 Abu Dhabi Central Bus Station to Ibn Battuta Bus Station
- E101 Abu Dhabi Central Bus Station to Al Ghubaiba Bus Station
- E102 MBZ City Bus Station to Al Jafiliya Bus Station

The detailed maps for these routes are available online. As of 2021, all buses services can be tracked live on Google Maps.

- Routes that start with A (such as A1) terminate at or go via Zayed International Airport.
- Routes that start with B (such as B45) are routes which only serve the suburbs of Shakhbout City, Al Shawamekh, Al Wathba and Baniyas.
- Routes that start with F (such as F1) are routes which serve the suburb of Al Falah.
- Routes that start with K (such as K2) are routes which only serve the suburb of Khalifa City.
- Routes that start with L (such as L41) are express lines of existing routes.
- Routes that start with M (such as M2) are routes which only serve the suburbs of MBZ City and Mussafah.
- Routes that start with N (such as N43) only operate at night.
- Routes that start with Q (such as Q3) are routes which only serve Rabdan.
- Routes that start with an X (such as X5) are express lines which are not of existing routes.

=== Autonomous Rapid Transit (AR1) ===
In October 2023, Txai & The Government of Abu Dhabi had collaborated to operate a tram-like electric articulated bus in Yas, Saadiyat & Reem Islands. Although this is done with the Abu Dhabi Government, Txai operates the Autonomous Rapid Transit as it is under "The Smart Mobility Project" aimed to improve transport within the emirate.

== Fares and payment ==
The current fare system in Abu Dhabi uses a contactless card for the fare collection system called Hafilat Card that launched on May 15, 2015. All buses use the Hafilat Card and charge a flat fare of AED 2 within Abu Dhabi City limits while trips to suburbs cost an additional 5 fils per kilometre.

There are many types of Hafilat Cards such as :

=== Temporary use Hafilat Cards ===
Temporary use Hafilat Cards are Hafilat cards which are only valid for a maximum of 14 days (2 weeks). The cards can be recharged up to AED 150 and they can be used to travel on Local Bus Services and Regional Bus Services. If the user wishes to only travel on Local Bus Services. The user may purchase a weekly pass which costs AED 30 per week with no additional charges. The cards can be obtained at Ticket Office Machines (TOMs) in the emirate.

=== Personal and Permanent use Hafilat Cards ===
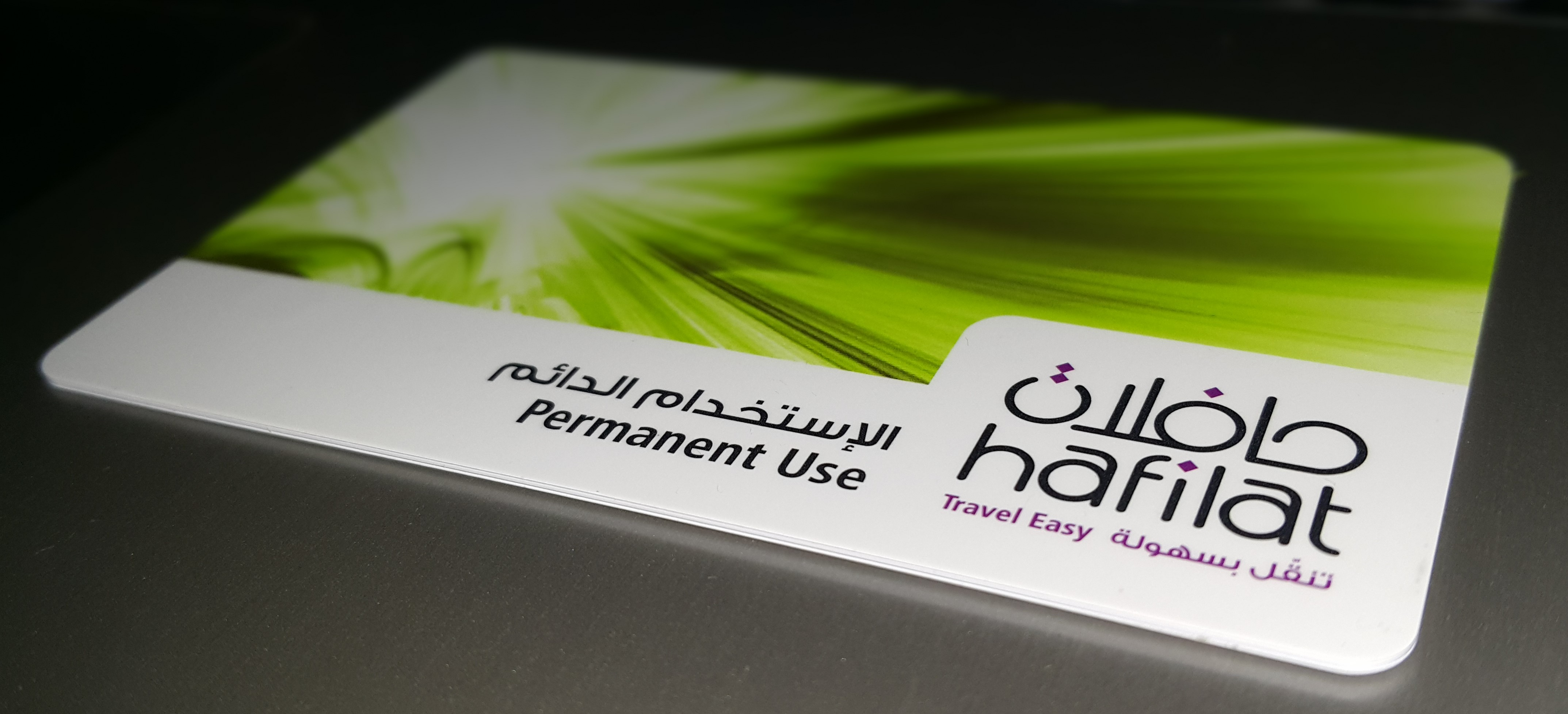
A Hafilat Card

Personal and Permanent use Hafilat Cards are Hafilat cards which are valid up to 5 years. The cards can be recharged up to AED 150 and they can be used to travel on Local Bus Services and Regional Bus Services. Personal use Cards cannot be obtained from Ticket Office Machines (TOMs) and must be instead issued at ticket offices in bus stations after bringing the required identification documents. Permanent use Cards can be obtained at Ticket Office Machines (TOMs) without the need for identification documents.

=== Special Needs and Senior Citizen Hafilat Cards ===
Special Needs and Senior Citizen Hafilat Cards offer the user a free annual pass which can be used on Local Bus Services and Regional Bus Services. They can be obtained at ticket offices in bus stations in the emirate after bringing the required identification documents.

=== Student Hafilat Cards ===
Student Hafilat Cards are cards which contain an AED 500 annual pass which can be used to travel on Local Bus Services and Regional Bus Services. They can be obtained at ticket offices in bus stations in the emirate after bringing the required identification documents.

== Recharge machines ==
Recharge machines are machines which are used to recharge Hafilat Cards. There are two types of recharge machines which are in use in the emirate.

=== Ticket Office Machines (TOMs) ===
Ticket Office Machines (shortened as TOM) are machines which can be used to issue Permanent Use Hafilat Cards and Temporary Use Hafilat Cards. The machines can also be used to recharge and add bus passes to issued Hafilat Cards. Payment at TOMs can be made using banknotes and coins and change can be retrieved from the machine if present. TOMs are located inside all bus stations in the emirate as well as shopping centres, airports and select bus stops.

=== Swift Recharge Machines (SRMs) ===
Swift Recharge Machines (shortened as SRM) are machines which can only be used to recharge issued Hafilat Cards. Payment at SRMs can only be made using select banknotes and change cannot be retrieved from the machine if present. SRMs are located inside select air-conditioned bus shelters, bus stations and in select shopping centres.

== Bus stops ==
Boarding and alighting are only permitted at designated bus stops, which are located throughout the emirate. The bus stops are located relatively close to each other. Most bus stops are equipped with air conditioned spaces.

== Local culture ==
As with most buses in the UAE, the front rows of seats (2 rows of 4 facing sideways) are priority seating for ladies. Males occupying those seats are required to give up their seats in the event of a lady standing.

== Gallery ==
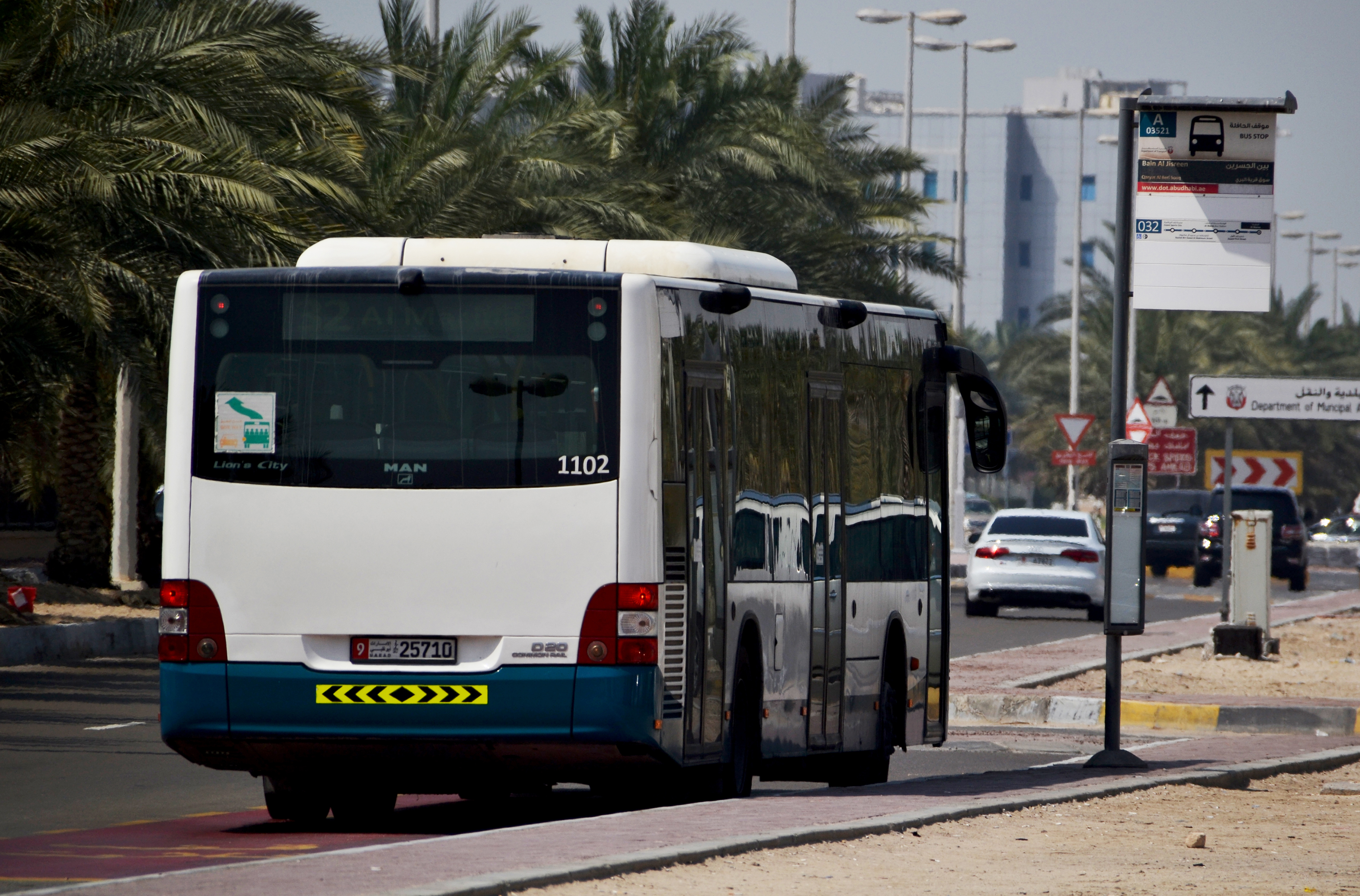
MAN Lion's City bus on route 32 (not on route) located at Souk Qaryat Al Beri terminus.Shot in 2016.

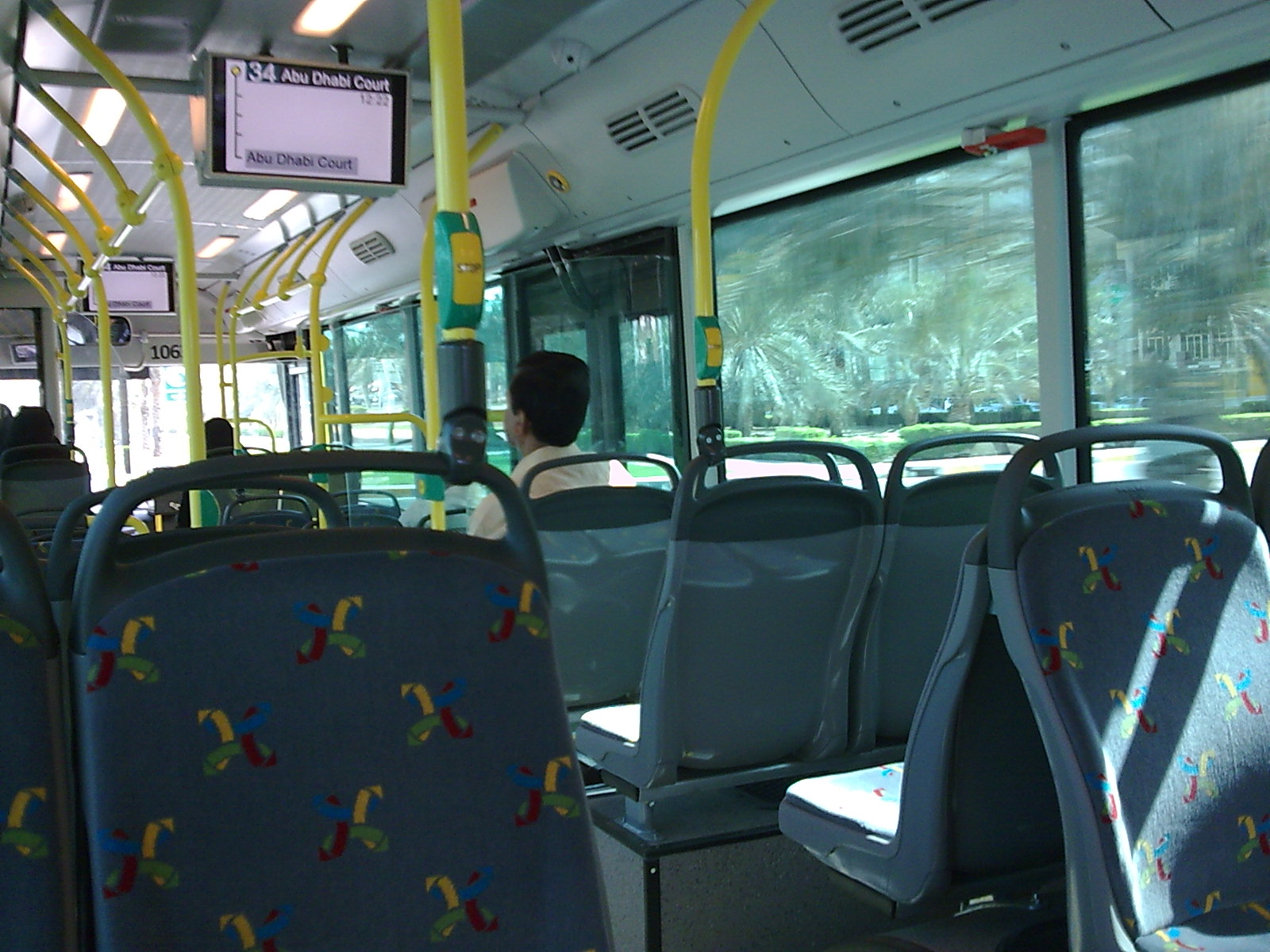
Interior view of an MAN Lion's city on route 34 to Abu Dhabi Courts.Shot in 2009.

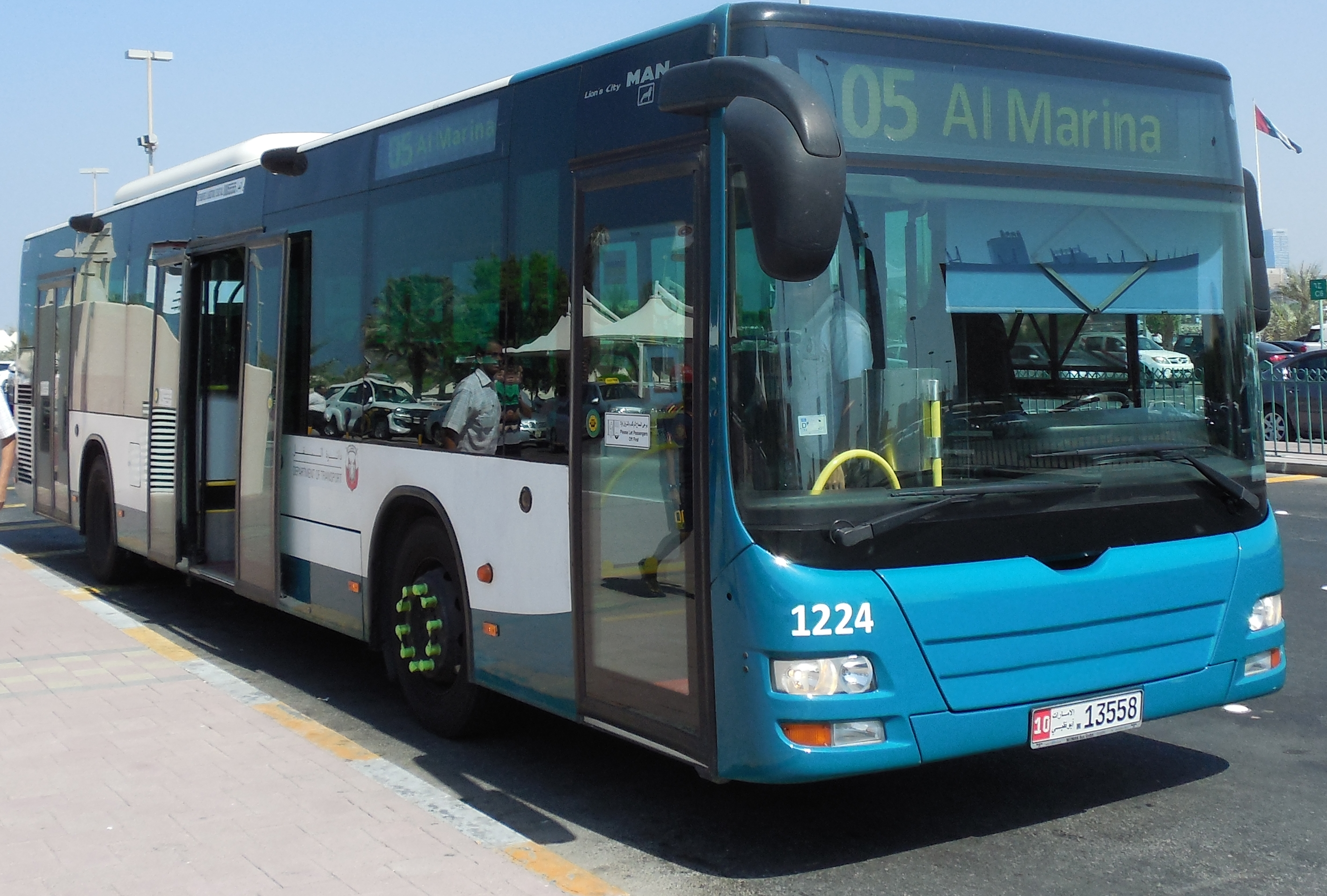
MAN Lion's City bus on route 05 located at Al Kasir Marina Mall terminus.Shot in 2013.
