= List of mosques in the United Arab Emirates =

This is a list of mosques in the United Arab Emirates, in the eastern part of the Arabian Peninsula.

Name	Images	Location	Year	Remarks
Sheikh Zayed Grand Mosque		Abu Dhabi City	2008	National mosque, the largest mosque in the UAE.
Zayed the Second Mosque, Al-Hisn		Abu Dhabi		Historical mosque near Qasr Al Hosn.
Imam Al-Tayeb Mosque		Abu Dhabi	2023	Part of the Abrahamic Family House
Sheikh Khalifa Bin Zayed Al Nahyan Mosque		Al Ain, Abu Dhabi	2021	The largest mosque in the city and one of the largest in the UAE. It is near an ancient mosque dated to the Islamic Golden Age, possibly the oldest mosque in the country.
Sheikha Salama Mosque		Al Ain	2011 (current structure)	Formerly the largest mosque in Al Ain.
Grand Mosque of Dubai		Dubai	1998	
Jumeirah Mosque		Dubai	1979	Most Beautiful Mosque in Dubai since 1979
Iranian Mosque, Bur Dubai		Dubai	1979	
Al Farooq Omar Bin Al Khattab Mosque		Dubai	2011	
Al Warqa Grand Mosque		Dubai	2016	It is styled after the Prophet's Mosque in Medina, western Saudi Arabia.
Mirdif Grand Mosque		Dubai	2018	Fatimid architecture
Al Bidya Mosque		Al Badiyah, Al-Fujairah	1446	Oldest functional mosque in the UAE.
Sheikh Zayed Mosque, Fujairah		Fujairah City	2015	The second largest mosque in the UAE.
King Faisal Mosque		Sharjah	1987	Formerly the largest in Sharjah and the country.
Al Noor Mosque		Sharjah	2005	
Sharjah Mosque		Sharjah	2019	The largest mosque in Sharjah.

== See also ==
- Islam in the United Arab Emirates
- Lists of mosques
