= Sheikh Khalifa Bin Zayed Al Nahyan Mosque =

Mosque in Al Ain, United Arab Emirates

- Masjid Aš-Šaykh Khalīfah Bin Zāyid Al Nahyān (مَسْجِد ٱلشَّيْخ خَلِيْفَة بِن زَايِد آل نَهْيَان): Sheikh Khalifa Bin Zayed Grand Mosque; Sheikh Khalifa Mosque (Arabic: مَسْجِد ٱلشَّيْخ خَلِيْفَة, romanized: Masjid Aš-Šaykh Khalīfah); Al Ain Grand Mosque

- Location in the U.A.E. Sheikh Khalifa Bin Zayed Al Nahyan Mosque (Persian Gulf) Sheikh Khalifa Bin Zayed Al Nahyan Mosque (Middle East) Sheikh Khalifa Bin Zayed Al Nahyan Mosque (West and Central Asia)

Religion
- Affiliation: Islam
- Region: Eastern Arabia
- Deity: Allah (God)
- Ownership: Government
- Year consecrated: 2021
- Status: Active

Location
- Location: Al Ain
- Municipality: Al Ain City Municipality
- State: Abu Dhabi
- Country: United Arab Emirates
- Territory: Al-Ain
- Coordinates: 24°13′33.6″N 55°44′49.2″E

Architecture
- Type: Mosque
- Style: Andalusian and Umayyad architecture
- Groundbreaking: 2013
- Completed: 2021
- Construction cost: AED 600 million (awarded)

Specifications
- Capacity: Over 20,000: Indoor: 6,433; Outdoor: 14,029
- Dome: 1
- Dome height (inner): 31.3 m (103 ft)
- Dome dia. (outer): 86 m (282 ft)
- Minaret: 4
- Minaret height: 60 m (200 ft)
- Site area: Built-up: 15,684 m^{2} (168,820 sq ft); Total: 256,680 m^{2} (2,762,900 sq ft)

Sheikh Khalifa Bin Zayed Al Nahyan Mosque (Arabic: مَسْجِد ٱلشَّيْخ خَلِيْفَة بِن زَايِد آل نَهْيَان, romanized: Masjid Aš-Šaykh Khalīfah Bin Zāyid Al Nahyān), also known as Al Ain Grand Mosque, Sheikh Khalifa Bin Zayed Grand Mosque, or simply the Sheikh Khalifa Mosque (Arabic: مَسْجِد ٱلشَّيْخ خَلِيْفَة, romanized: Masjid Aš-Šaykh Khalīfah), is the largest mosque in the city of Al Ain in the Emirate of Abu Dhabi, and one of the largest mosques in the United Arab Emirates. Open to the public since 12 April 2021, it is named after Sheikh Khalifa bin Zayed Al Nahyan, who was the Ruler of Abu Dhabi and President of the United Arab Emirates from November 2004 until his death in May 2022.

== History ==
Construction of the mosque was awarded to Arabian Construction Company for AED 600 million. It started in December 2013, and was initially scheduled for completion in 2016. Formerly, the biggest mosque in use in the city was that of Shaikhah Salamah, mother of the late Sheikh Zayed bin Sultan Al Nahyan, the father of Sheikh Khalifa.

Nearby, a 1000-year-old mosque dated to the Islamic Golden Age, besides other remains relevant to the region's history, was unearthed in September 2018. Its age may make it the oldest mosque in the country.

After opening in 2021, Sheikh Tahnoun bin Mohammed Al Nahyan, the Ruler's Representative in Al Ain Region, offered prayers on 13 May.

== Structure ==
The built-up area of the mosque is occupies an area of 15,684 m^{2} (168,820 ft^{2}), with the total area of the mosque being 256,680 m^{2} (2,762,900 ft^{2}). With an indoor capacity of 6,433 worshippers, and an outdoor capacity of 14,029, its total capacity would be over 20,000. It has 4 minarets measuring about 60 m (200 ft) high, which are inspired by the Great Mosque of Samarra. Additionally, there is an arcade which connects the various parts of the mosque and rims the yard with an area of 7,660 m^{2} (82,500 ft^{2}). It was inspired by Andalusian and Umayyad architecture. The structural engineering of the Mosque was designed by DeSimone Consulting Engineers Abu Dhabi and Dubai offices and uses substantial amounts of prestressed concrete to support the 20,000 worshipers who can occupy the mosque at any given time and to keep its interior column free.

=== Dome ===
The main feature of the mosque is a huge dome, the largest of its kind in the country, which covers the main prayer-hall. Adorned with verses from the Quran, the dome has an interior height of 31.3 m (103 ft), an interior diameter of 75 m (246 ft), an exterior diameter of 86 m (282 ft), and a total area of 4,117 m^{2} (44,320 ft^{2}).

== See also ==
- Arabian Peninsula
- Islam in the United Arab Emirates
  - List of mosques in the United Arab Emirates
