= Al Noor Mosque (Sharjah) =

Mosque in Sharjah

- Jāmiʿ An-Nūr (جَامِع ٱلنُّوْر)

- Location in the U.A.E.

Religion
- Affiliation: Sunni Islam
- Ownership: Sharjah Government
- Leadership: Imam(s): Imams both from Syria; Spokesperson: Sharjah Centre for Cultural Communication

Location
- Location: Khalid Lagoon at the Buhaira Corniche, Sharjah, United Arab Emirates
- Interactive map of Al Noor Mosque
- Coordinates: 25°20′6″N 55°23′13.92″E

Architecture
- Architect: Architectural Academic Office
- Type: Mosque
- Style: Turkish Ottoman
- General contractor: United Engineering
- Groundbreaking: April 6, 2003
- Completed: 2005

Specifications
- Capacity: 2200 (1800 male; 400 female)
- Dome: 34
- Dome height (inner): 31.5 m (103 ft)
- Minaret: 2
- Minaret height: 52 m (171 ft)
- Materials: GRC, Marble and Gypsum

Website
- shjculture.com

Al Noor Mosque (Arabic: جَامِع ٱلنُّوْر, romanized: Jāmiʿ An-Nūr) is a mosque in Sharjah, the U.A.E., located on the Khaled lagoon at the Buhaira Corniche. It is of Turkish Ottoman design and was influenced by the Sultan Ahmed Mosque in Turkey. It is one of the mosques open to the public in Sharjah, which has over 600 total.

In 2014 the mosque set a Guinness World Record for the "World's largest wooden charity box" for their Ramadan donation campaign.

Al Noor Mosque at night

El Noor Mosque as seen from Corniche Street

== See also ==
- Islam in the United Arab Emirates
- Sharjah Light Festival
