= Sheikh Khalifa Mosque (disambiguation) =

Sheikh Khalifa Mosque may refer to any of the following mosques, the first two being named after Sheikh Khalifa bin Zayed Al Nahyan, President of the United Arab Emirates and Ruler of the Emirate of Abu Dhabi:

- Sheikh Khalifa Bin Zayed Al Nahyan Mosque in Al Ain, the UAE
- Sheikh Khalifa Bin Zayed Al Nahyan Mosque, Bethany, Jerusalem, the West Bank
- Sheikh Khalifa Mosque, Lukoye, Mumias, Kenya
