= King Faisal Mosque, Sharjah =

Large mosque in Sharjah, the United Arab Emirates

King Faisal Mosque
- Masjid Al-Malik Fayṣal (مَسْجِد ٱلْمَلِك فَيْصَل)
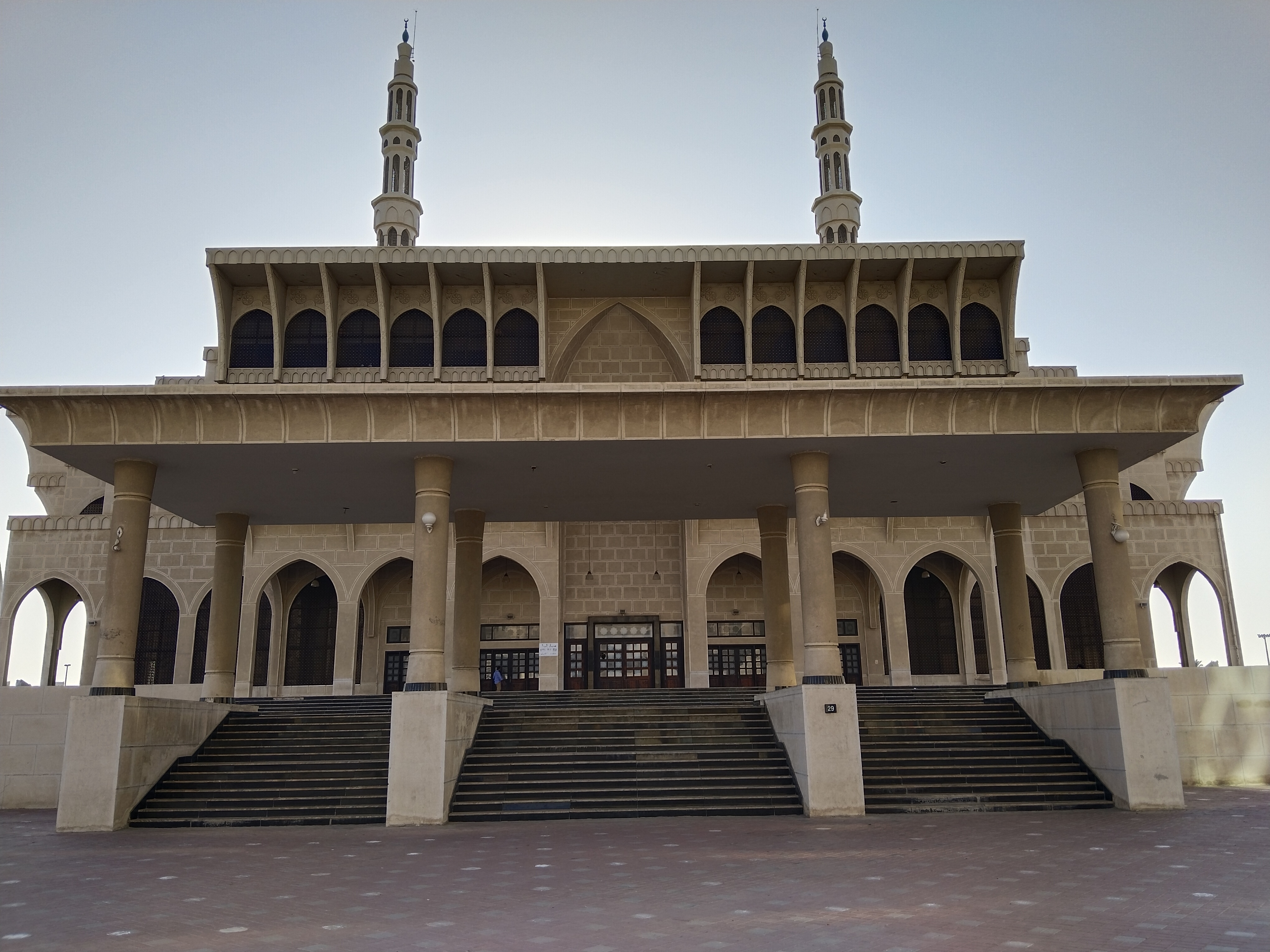
- Main Entrance of King Faisal Mosque in Sharjah

- Location in the U.A.E. King Faisal Mosque, Sharjah (Persian Gulf) King Faisal Mosque, Sharjah (Middle East) King Faisal Mosque, Sharjah (West and Central Asia)

Religion
- Affiliation: Islam
- Ownership: Government

Location
- Location: Sharjah, United Arab Emirates
- Interactive map of King Faisal Mosque
- Coordinates: 25°20′58″N 55°23′15″E

Architecture
- Architect: Abdul-Rahman Abdul-Hafidh Al-Junaidi (Note: Descendant of the Islamic Prophet Muhammad, via Al-Husayn ibn Ali)
- Type: Mosque
- Style: Islamic
- Groundbreaking: 1984
- Completed: Friday, 23rd of January, 1987

Specifications
- Capacity: 16,670
- Dome: 1
- Minaret: 2
- Minaret height: 70 m (230 ft)
- Site area: 10,000–12,000 m^{2} (110,000–130,000 sq ft)

The King Faisal Mosque (Arabic: مَسْجِد ٱلْمَلِك فَيْصَل, romanized: Masjid Al-Malik Fayṣal) is a mosque in Sharjah, the United Arab Emirates. It is named after the former ruler of Saudi Arabia King Faisal of Saudi Arabia.

== History ==
Construction of the mosque started in 1984, and it was completed and opened to the public on Friday the 23rd of January, 1987. Named after King Faisal of Saudi Arabia, it had been the largest in the Emirate of Sharjah and country. Currently, the Sharjah Mosque in the area of Tay is the largest mosque in the Emirate, and the Sheikh Zayed Grand Mosque is the largest in the nation.

== Geography ==
The mosque is located on King Faisal Road and Al Arouba Street in the central part of Sharjah, near the headquarters of Dubai Islamic Bank in Sharjah, Al Ittihad (Union) Park, the Central Bus Station and Al Jubail Souq.

== Structure ==
The mosque has 2 minarets which measure 70 m (230 ft), an area of 10,000–12,000 m^{2} (110,000–130,000 sq ft), and a capacity of 16,670 worshippers, of which 12,000 can be seated. The mosque has functions even apart from hosting male and female worshippers. The second floor is occupied by Sharjah's Department of Islamic Affairs and Awqaf, including a general library and offices, adding the library having approximately 7,000 books on Islamic thought and history, modern books on Islamic Sharia and ahadith, in addition to cultural, literary and scientific works. The ground and first floors are for men to pray in, and the basement for women. Near the women's prayer hall is a big place where people may donate clothes for the needy, under the supervision of Sharjah International Charitable Organisation, which also has offices in the building.

== Gallery ==
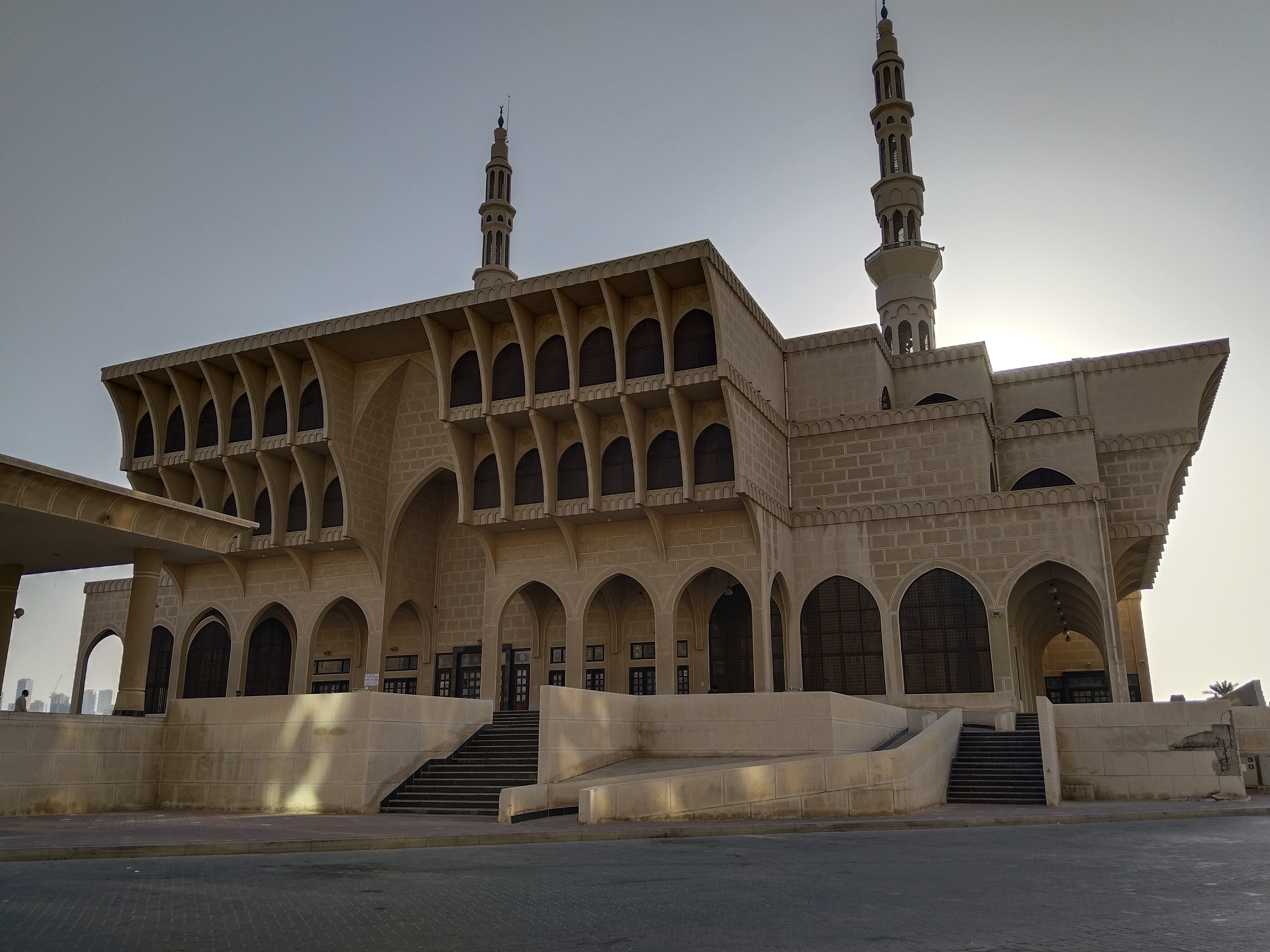
Right Side View of King Faisal Mosque in Sharjah

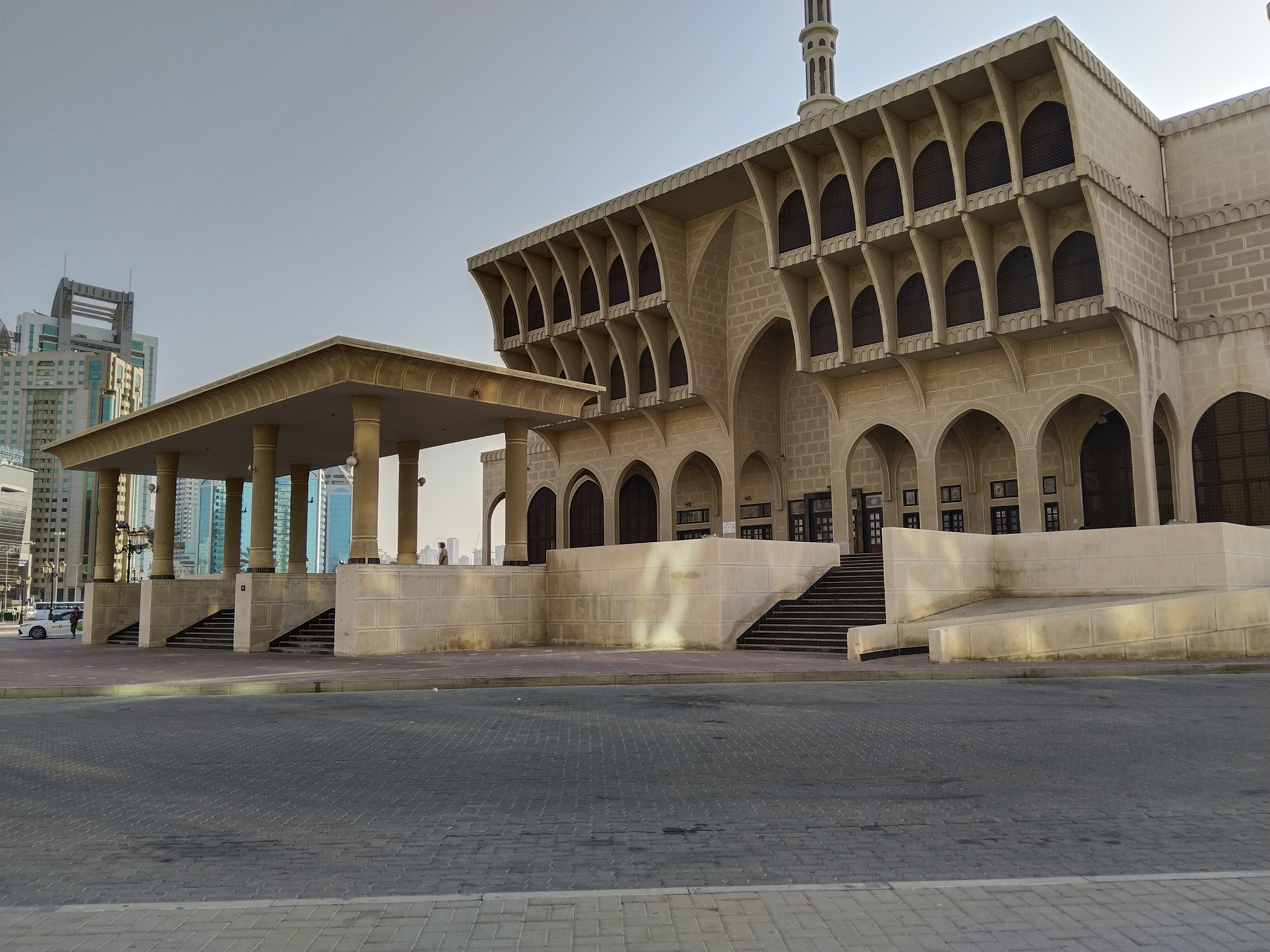
Right Side View of King Faisal Mosque in Sharjah

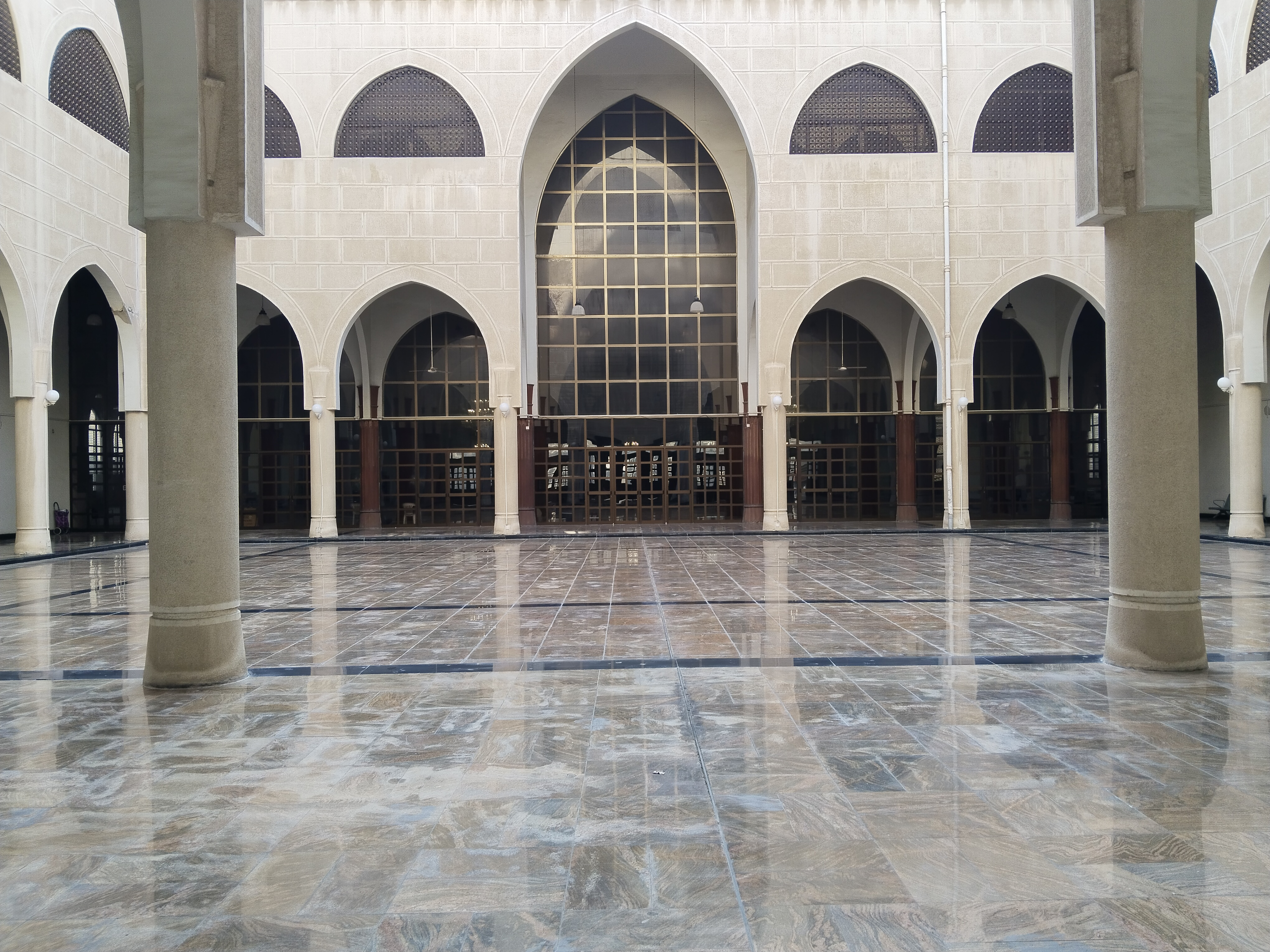
Mosque Entrance of King Faisal Mosque in Sharjah

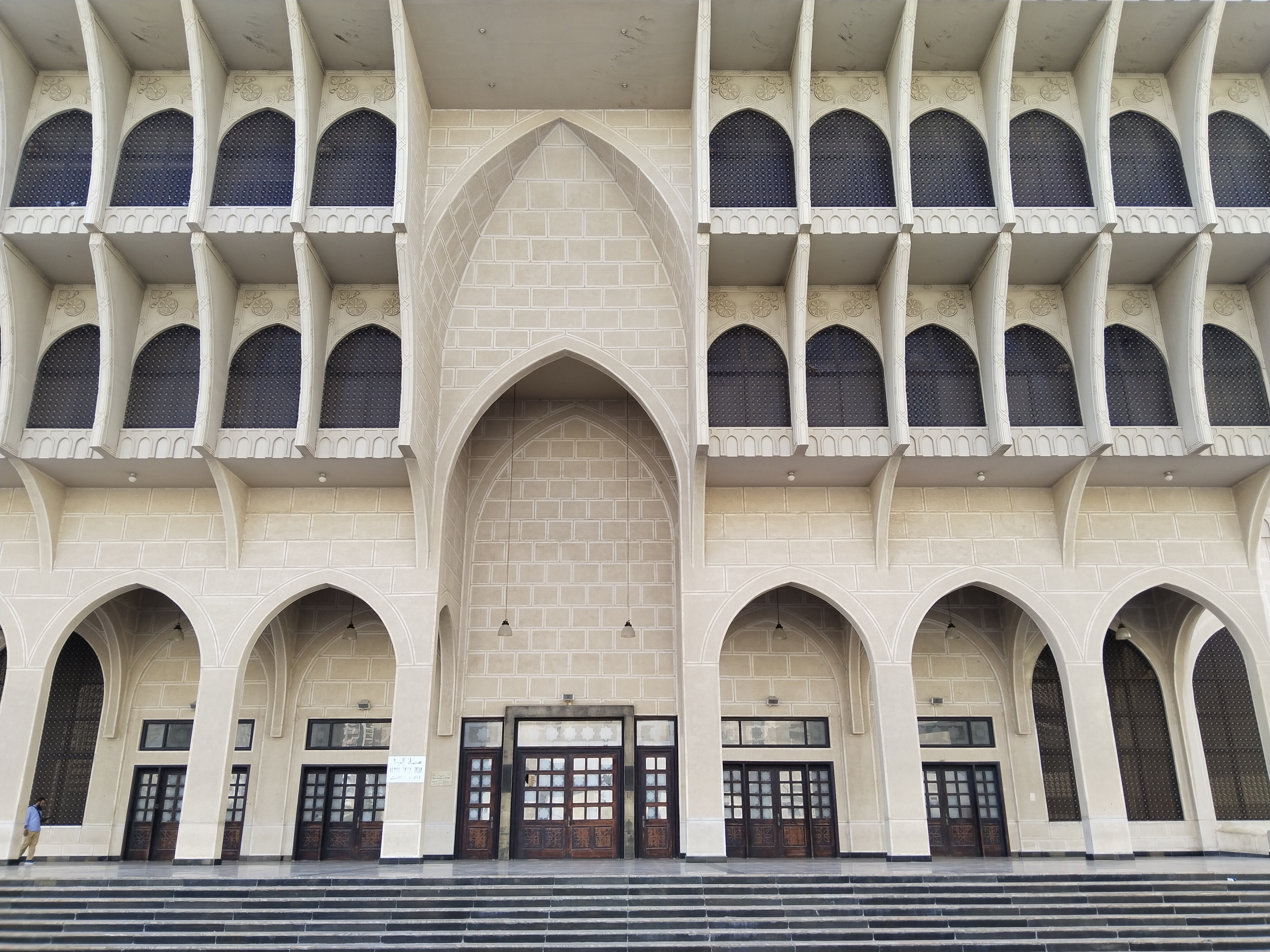
Main Entrance of King Faisal Mosque in Sharjah

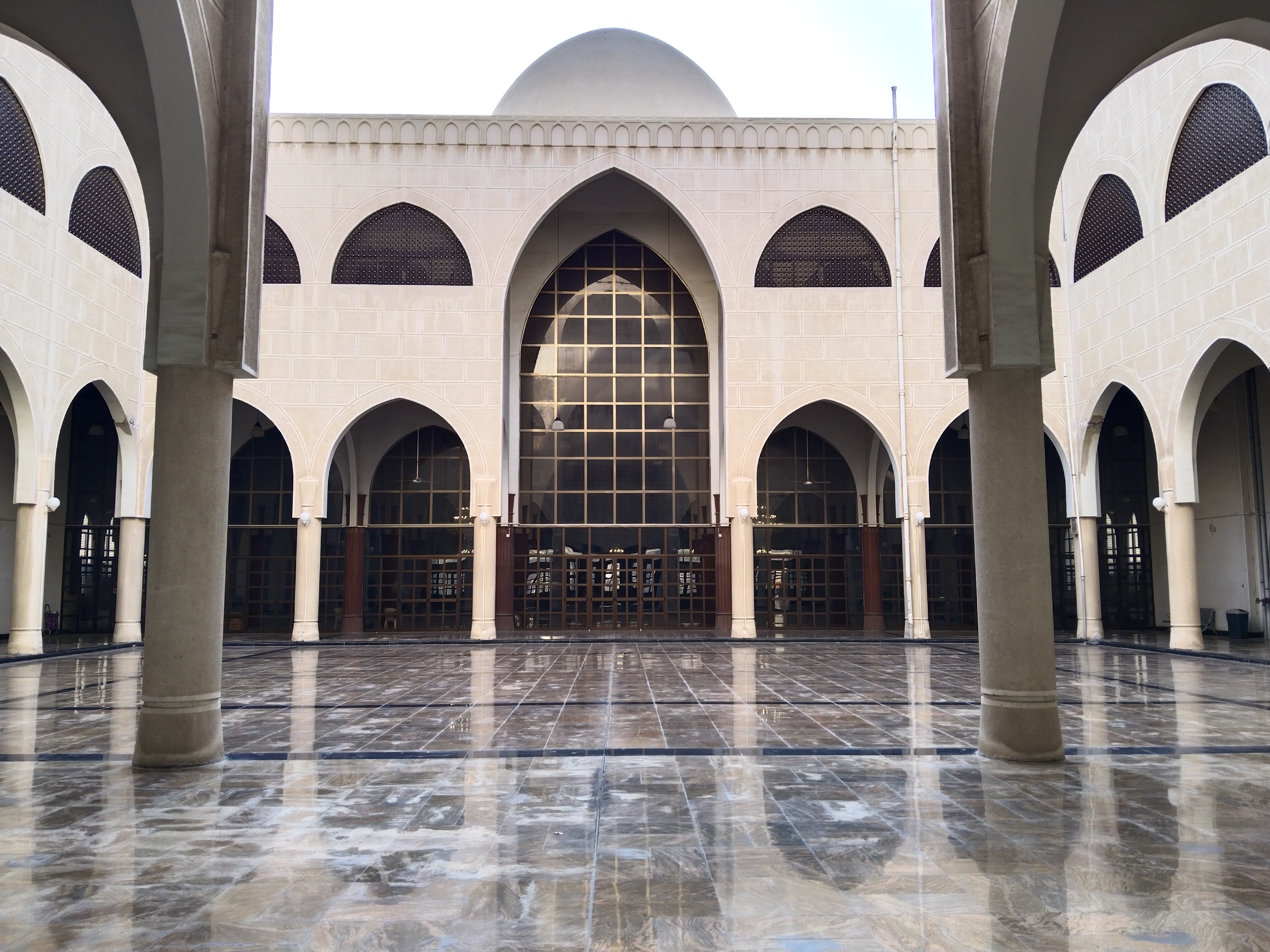
Mosque Entrance of King Faisal Mosque in Sharjah

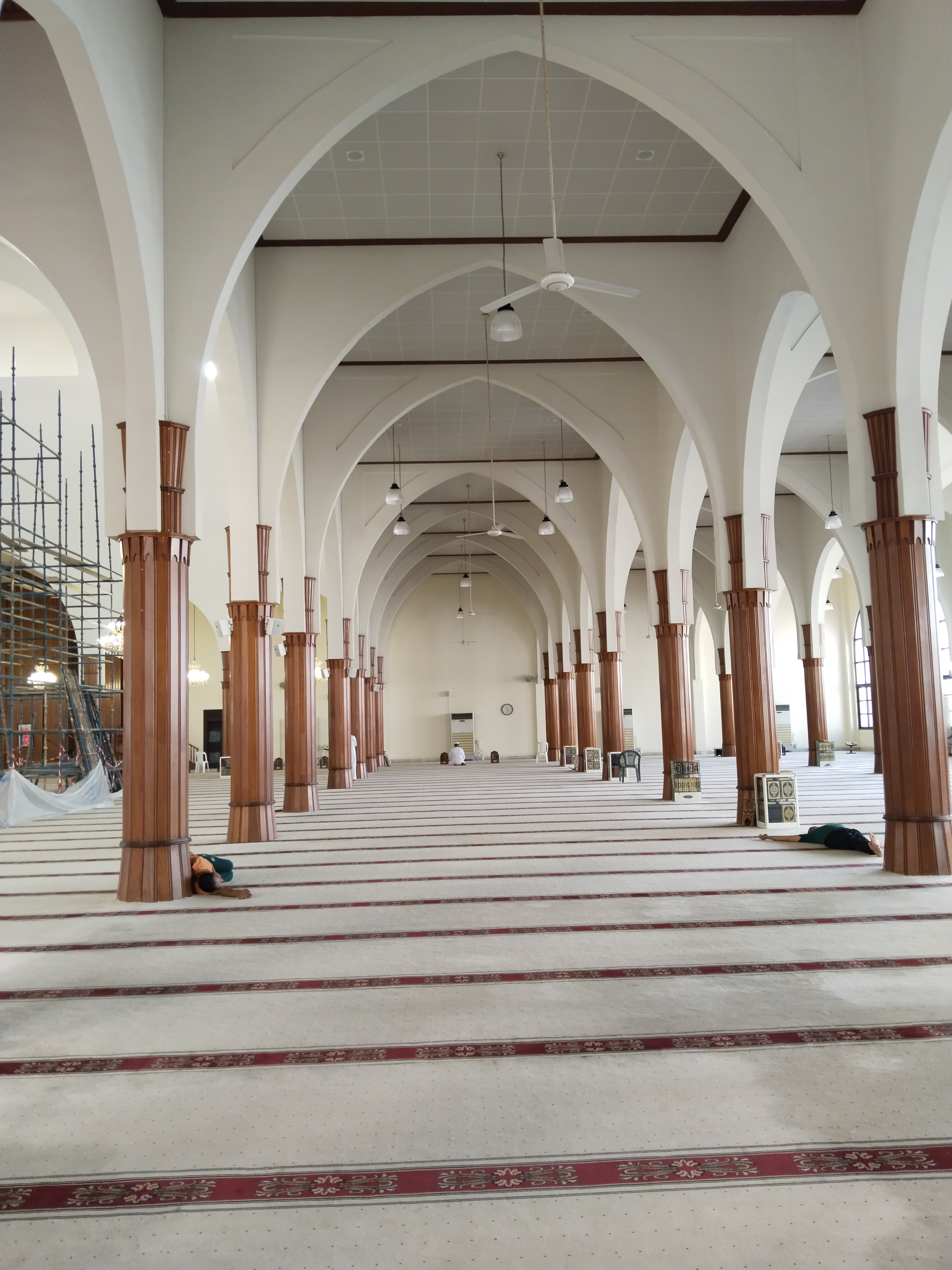
Inside View of King Faisal Mosque in Sharjah

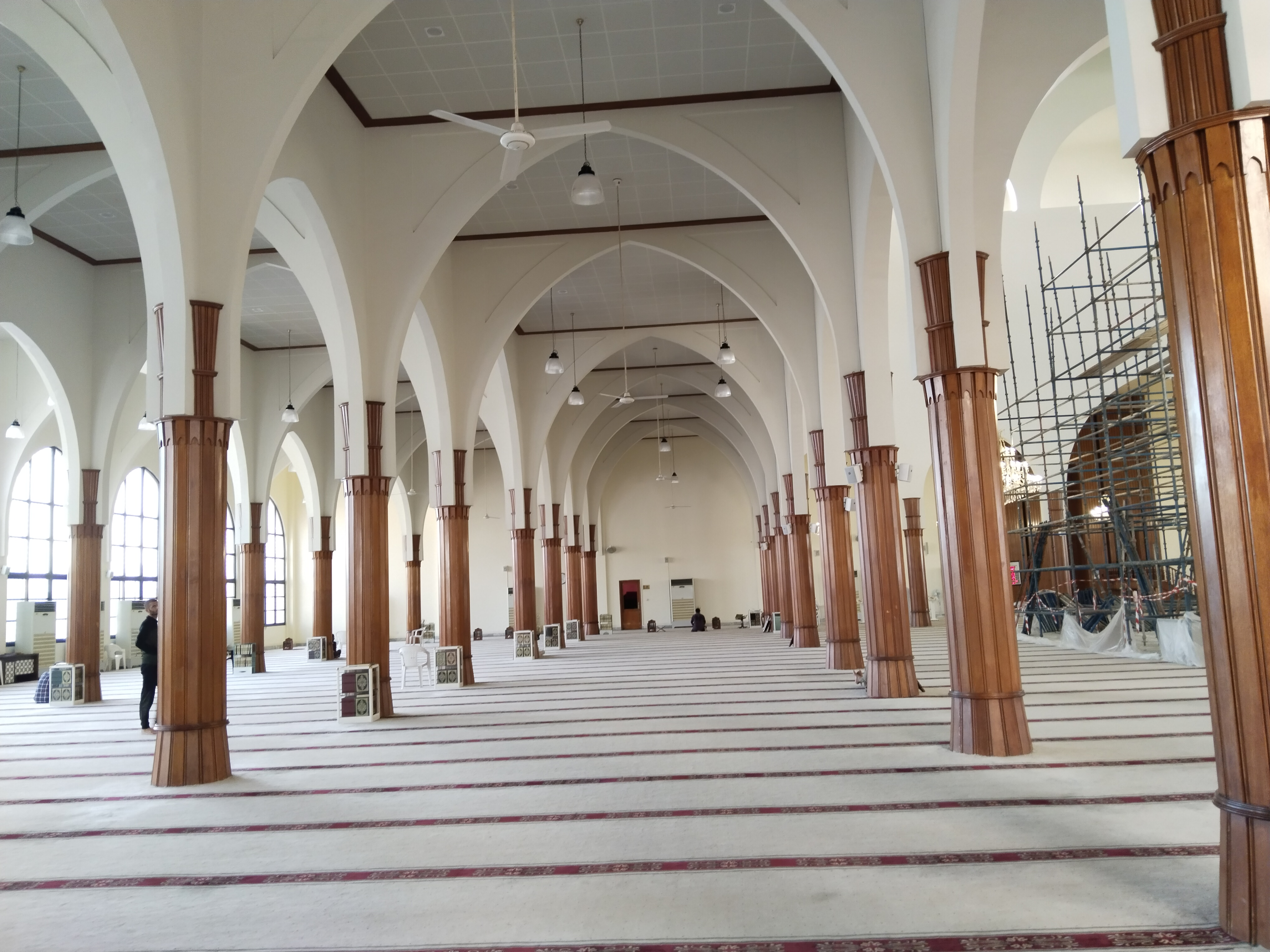
Inside View of King Faisal Mosque in Sharjah

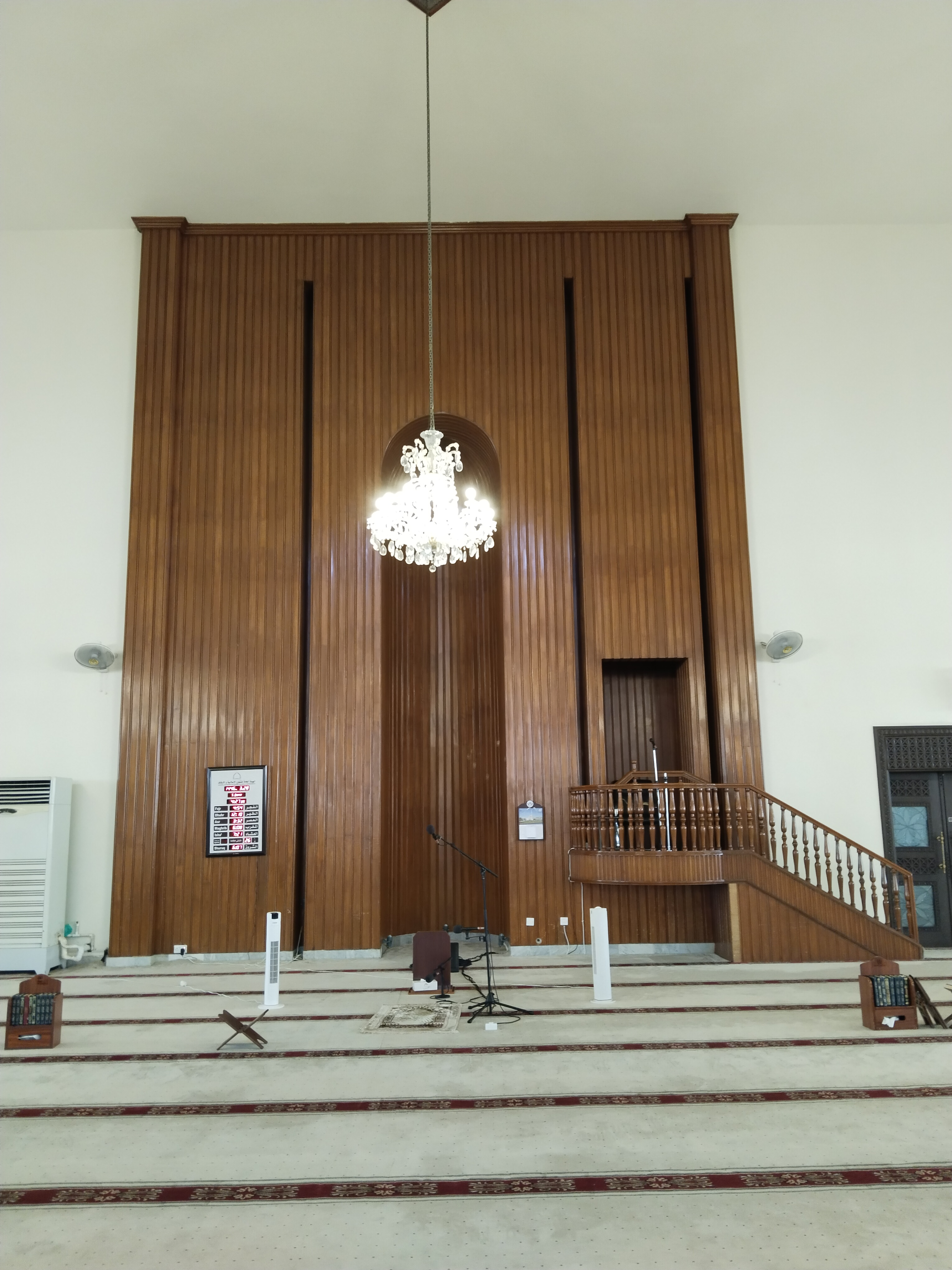
Minbar of King Faisal Mosque in Sharjah

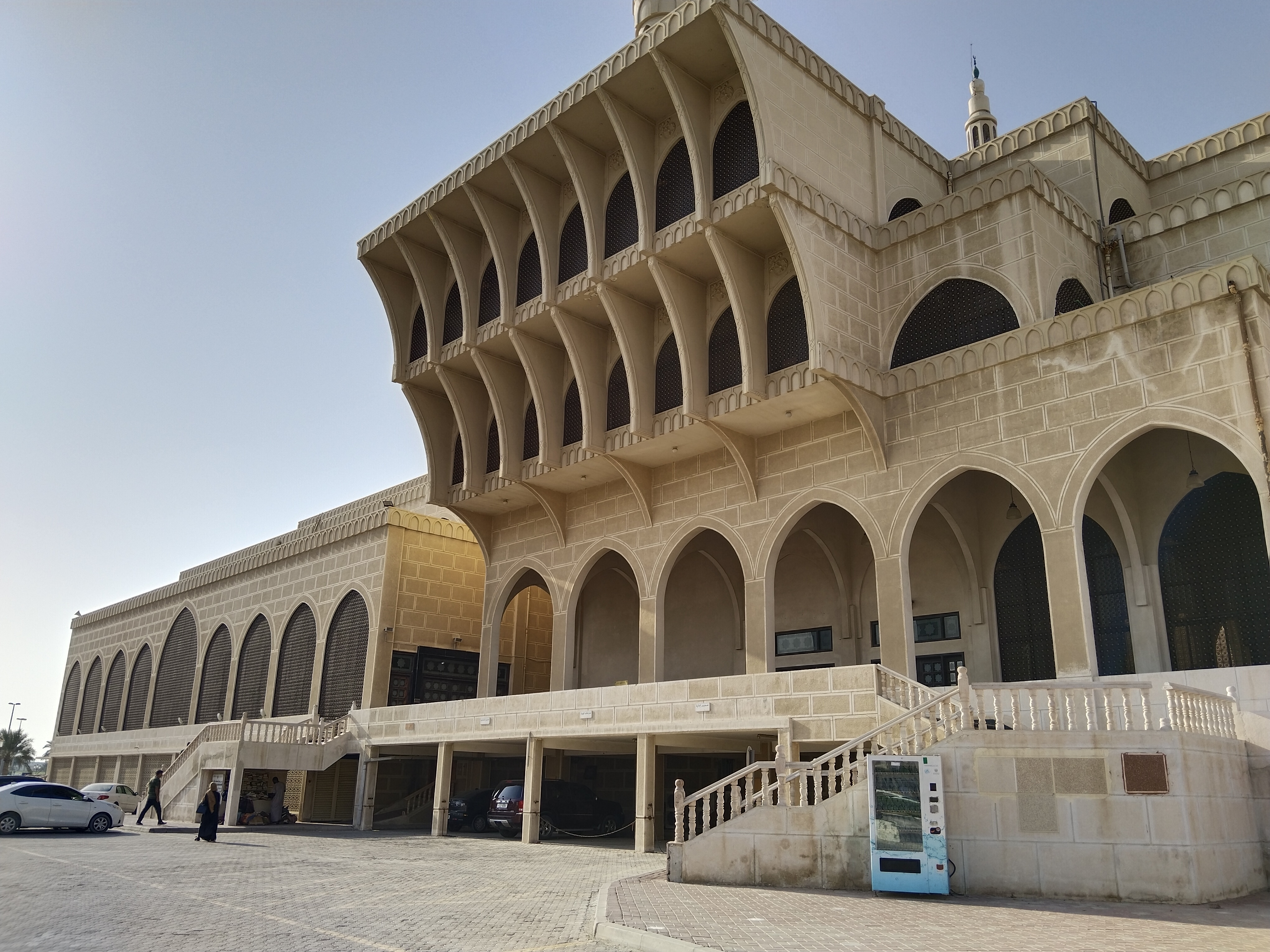
Left Side View of King Faisal Mosque in Sharjah

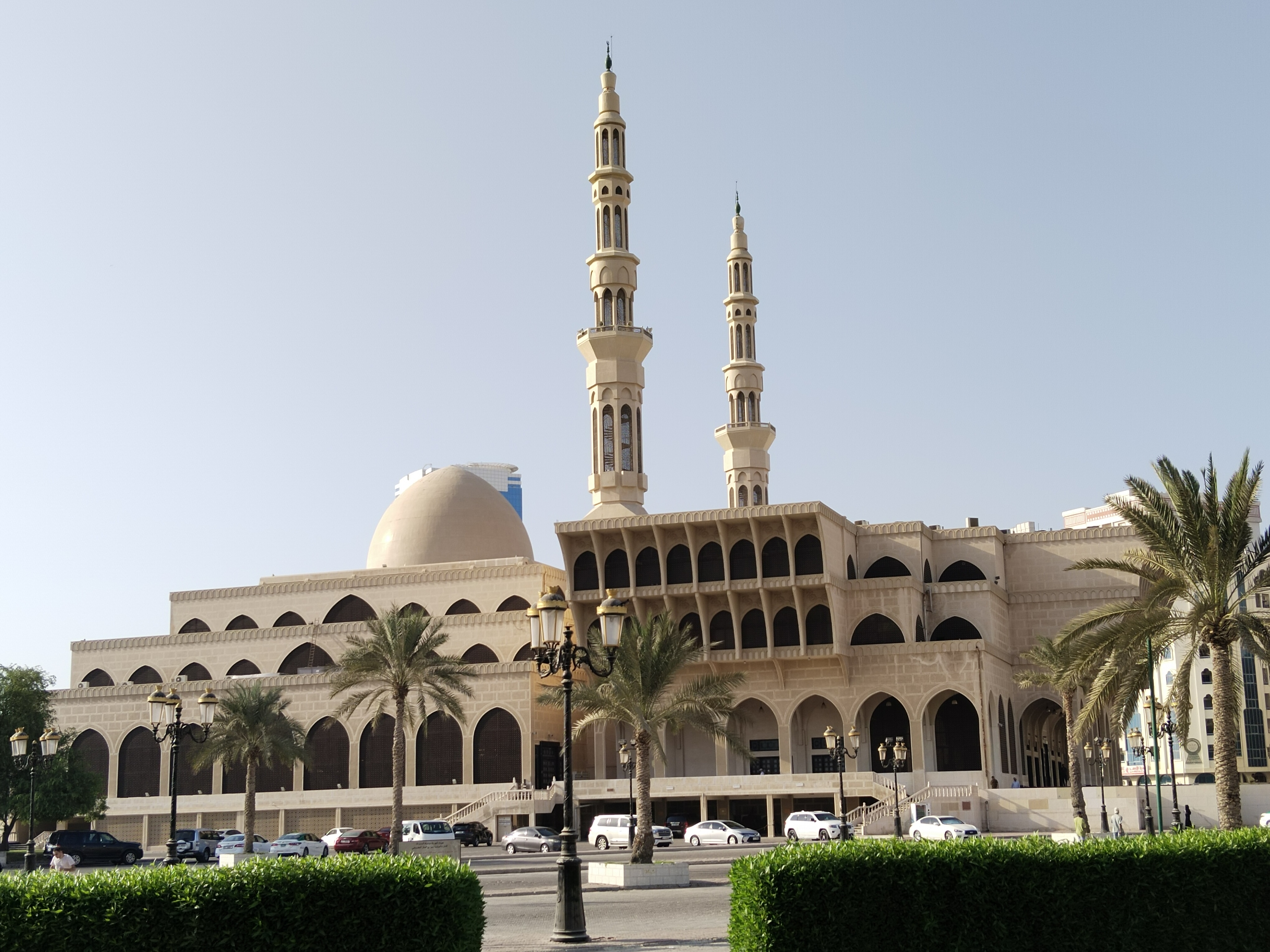
Full View of King Faisal Mosque in Sharjah

== See also ==
- Islam in the United Arab Emirates
  - List of mosques in the United Arab Emirates
- List of things named after Saudi kings
  - King Faisal Mosque, Islamabad, Pakistan
