= Sheikh Zayed Mosque, Fujairah =

Mosque in Fujairah, United Arab Emirates

Coordinates: 25°7′33.89″N 56°19′36.77″E

Sheikh Zayed Mosque
- Masjid Aš-Šaykh Zāyid fil-Fujayrah (مَسْجِد ٱلشَّيْخ زَايِد فِي ٱلْفُجَيْرَة)

- Location in the U.A.E. Sheikh Zayed Mosque, Fujairah (Persian Gulf) Sheikh Zayed Mosque, Fujairah (Middle East) Sheikh Zayed Mosque, Fujairah (West and Central Asia)

Religion
- Affiliation: Sunni Islam
- Ownership: Government

Location
- Location: Fujairah, United Arab Emirates
- Interactive map of Sheikh Zayed Mosque

Architecture
- Type: Mosque
- Style: Ottoman and Moorish
- Groundbreaking: 2010
- Completed: 2014
- Construction cost: AED 210 million

Specifications
- Capacity: about 28,000: Courtyard: 14,000
- Length: 420 m (1,380 ft)
- Dome: 65
- Minaret: 6
- Minaret height: between 80 and 100 metres (260 and 330 feet)
- Site area: 39,000 m^{2} (420,000 sq ft)

The Sheikh Zayed Mosque, Fujairah (Arabic: مَسْجِد ٱلشَّيْخ زَايِد فِي ٱلْفُجَيْرَة, romanized: Masjid Aš-Šaykh Zāyid fil-Fujayrah), is the main mosque in the Emirate of Fujairah, and the second largest in the U.A.E. after the mosque with the same name in Abu Dhabi.

== History ==
The mosque opened in 2015, and Fujairah's ruler, Sheikh Hamad bin Mohammed Al Sharqi, led the first Eid prayers.

== Geography ==
The mosque is located on Mohammed bin Matar Road in central Fujairah City.

== Structure ==
Similar in appearance to the Blue Mosque in Istanbul, this large white mosque is a landmark that is visible from many locations in the centre of the city. It can hold around 28,000 worshippers, and measures 39,000 m^{2} (3.9 ha; 9.6 acres). It has 65 domes and six minarets, between 80 and 100 metres (260 and 330 feet) in height. The courtyard of the mosque, with fountains and gardens, can hold 14,000 people.

== See also ==
- Islam in the United Arab Emirates
- List of mosques in the United Arab Emirates
  - Sheikh Zayed Grand Mosque, Abu Dhabi
