= Sharjah Mosque =

Mosque in Sharjah, United Arab Emirates

- Masjid Aš-Šārjah (مَسْجِد ٱلشَّارْقَة)

- Location in the U.A.E. Sharjah Mosque (Persian Gulf) Sharjah Mosque (Middle East) Sharjah Mosque (West and Central Asia)

Religion
- Affiliation: Islam
- Region: Eastern Arabia
- Deity: Allah (God)
- Ownership: Government of Sharjah
- Year consecrated: 2019
- Status: Active

Location
- Location: Emirates Road and Maleha Road intersection, Sharjah
- Municipality: Sharjah
- State: Sharjah
- Country: United Arab Emirates
- Coordinates: 25°14′27″N 55°34′13″E

Architecture
- Type: Mosque
- Style: Ottoman-Islamic architecture
- Groundbreaking: 2014
- Completed: 2019

Specifications
- Direction of façade: Qiblah
- Capacity: 25,000: Indoor: > 5,000; Female worshipers: 610; Outdoor: 13,500
- Minaret: 2
- Site area: 2,000,000 sq ft (190,000 m^{2})

The Sharjah Mosque (Gulf Arabic: مَسْجِد ٱلشَّارْقَة, romanized: Masjid Aš-Šārjah), is the largest mosque in the Emirate of Sharjah, the U.A.E. Besides serving the needs of Muslims, the mosque has a library, and an area for giving Dawah to non-Muslims.

== History ==
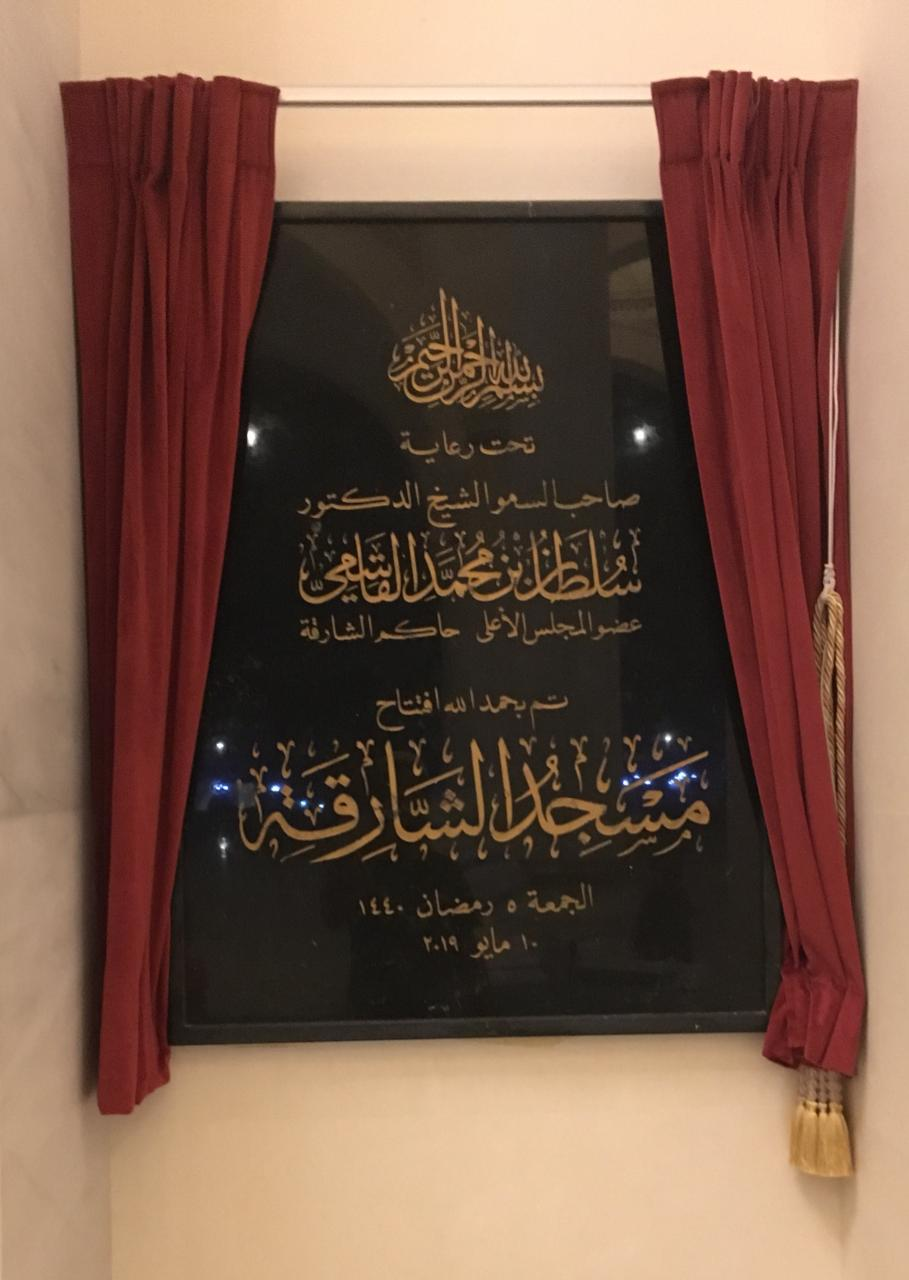
Arabic plaque showing name of mosque and date of inauguration

Construction began in 2014, costing around 300 million dirhams. It was inaugurated on 10 May 2019 by Ruler of Sharjah, Shaikh Sultan bin Muhammad Al-Qasimi.

Two coins, one gold and one silver, each inscribed with a verse from the Quran, were issued by the Central Bank of the United Arab Emirates, and designed by the Sharjah Islamic Bank, to commemorate the occasion.

== Geography, dimensions and statistics ==
The mosque, designed in classical Ottoman style, is located in the area of Tay, at the junction of the Emirates Road and the road to Mleiha. The mosque, its gardens and facilities are built over a total area of 2,000,000 sq ft (190,000 m^{2}). To compare, the King Faisal Mosque, formerly the largest mosque in the Emirate and country, measures 10,000–12,000 m^{2} (110,000–130,000 sq ft). The Sharjah Mosque is open to non-Muslim visitors, with dedicated spaces and pathways defined for them. The mosque is home to a large library that has many original Islamic works. Over 2,200 cars and buses can be parked in the different parking lots of the mosque complex. A rubber track goes around the mosque for visitors who wish to go for a walk around the complex. It also has a souvenir shop, museum and fountains. It is equipped with two ablution areas, and 100 wheelchairs for the elderly.

It can accommodate up to 25,000 worshipers, with an inside capacity of over 5,000 people, 610 of whom can be women. The front hall and side lobbies have a capacity of more than 6,000 worshipers, while the outdoor area can accommodate 13,500.

Dr Sheikh Sultan; Sheikh Sultan bin Mohammed bin Sultan Al Qasimi, Crown Prince and Deputy Ruler of Sharjah; other Sheikhs and officials joined residents to offer the Isha and Taraweeh prayers on Friday.

After that, the Sharjah Ruler toured the mosque's collection hall, which houses books and antiques from different Islamic eras. He also viewed a 3D hologram show and documentary about the mosque.

== See also ==
- List of mosques in the United Arab Emirates
  - Sheikh Zayed Grand Mosque
- Timeline of Islamic history
- Sharjah Light Festival
- Sultan Qaboos Grand Mosque
