= Sharjah Light Festival =

Annual cultural event in the United Arab Emirates

Sharjah Light Festival مَهْرَجَان أَضْوَاء ٱلشَّارْقَة
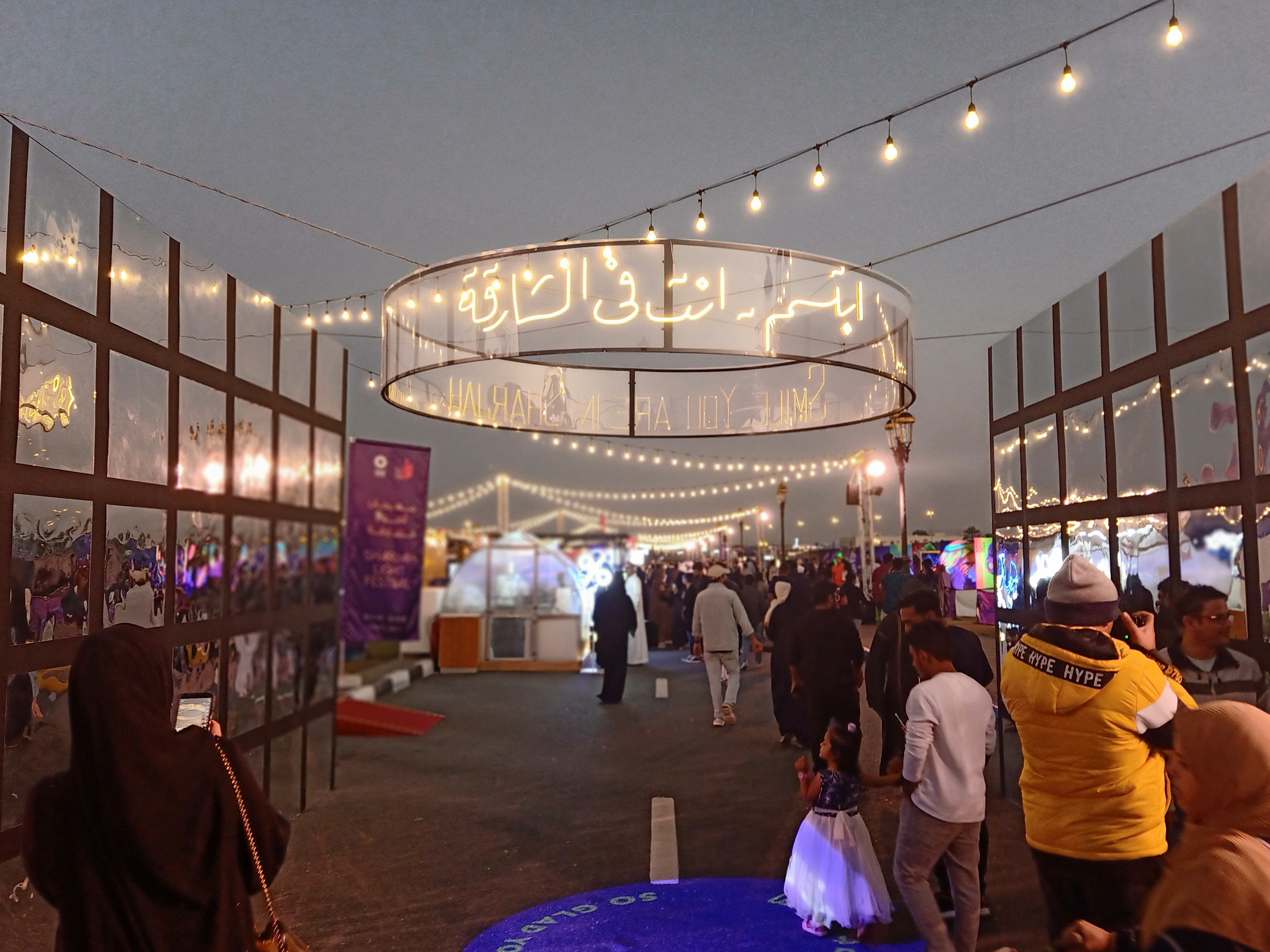
- At the University City Hall in 2023
- Status: Active
- Genre: Light Festival, conferences, exhibitions
- Frequency: Annually
- Venue: Sharjah
- Locations: Sharjah Mosque, the University City Hall, Al Majaz Waterfront, and others
- Years active: 16
- Founded: 2010; 16 years ago
- Founder: His Highness Sheikh Dr. Sultan bin Muhammad Al Qasimi
- Organiser: Tourism in Sharjah
- Sponsor: Sharjah's Government
- Website: www.sharjahlightfestival.ae/en/

The Sharjah Light Festival (Arabic: مَهْرَجَان أَضْوَاء ٱلشَّارْقَة, romanized: Mahrajān Aḍwāʾ Aš-Šārjah) is a light show that takes place annually in the Emirate of Sharjah, the U.A.E. The festival was first established in 2010 under the patronage of His Highness Sheikh Dr. Sultan bin Muhammad Al Qasimi, Member of the Supreme Council and Ruler of Sharjah, and has since become an integral part of the city's cultural landscape.

== Locations ==
The festival features locations across the entire Sharjah Emirate, extending to the east coast towns of Dibba, Khorfakkan and Kalba. Thirteen landmarks and locations in Sharjah will be illuminated as part of the festival:

- University City Hall
- Al-Noor Mosque
- Sharjah Mosque
- Khalid Lagoon Corniche
- Al Majaz Waterfront
- Sharjah Fort
- Al Hamriyah Municipality building
- Al Dhaid Fort
- Al Rafisah Dam in Khor Fakkan
- Kalba Clock Tower
- Sheikh Rashid bin Ahmed Al Qasimi Mosque in Dibba Al-Hisn
- The Headquarters of the Beeah Group
- The Light Village

== Gallery ==
Al-Noor Mosque

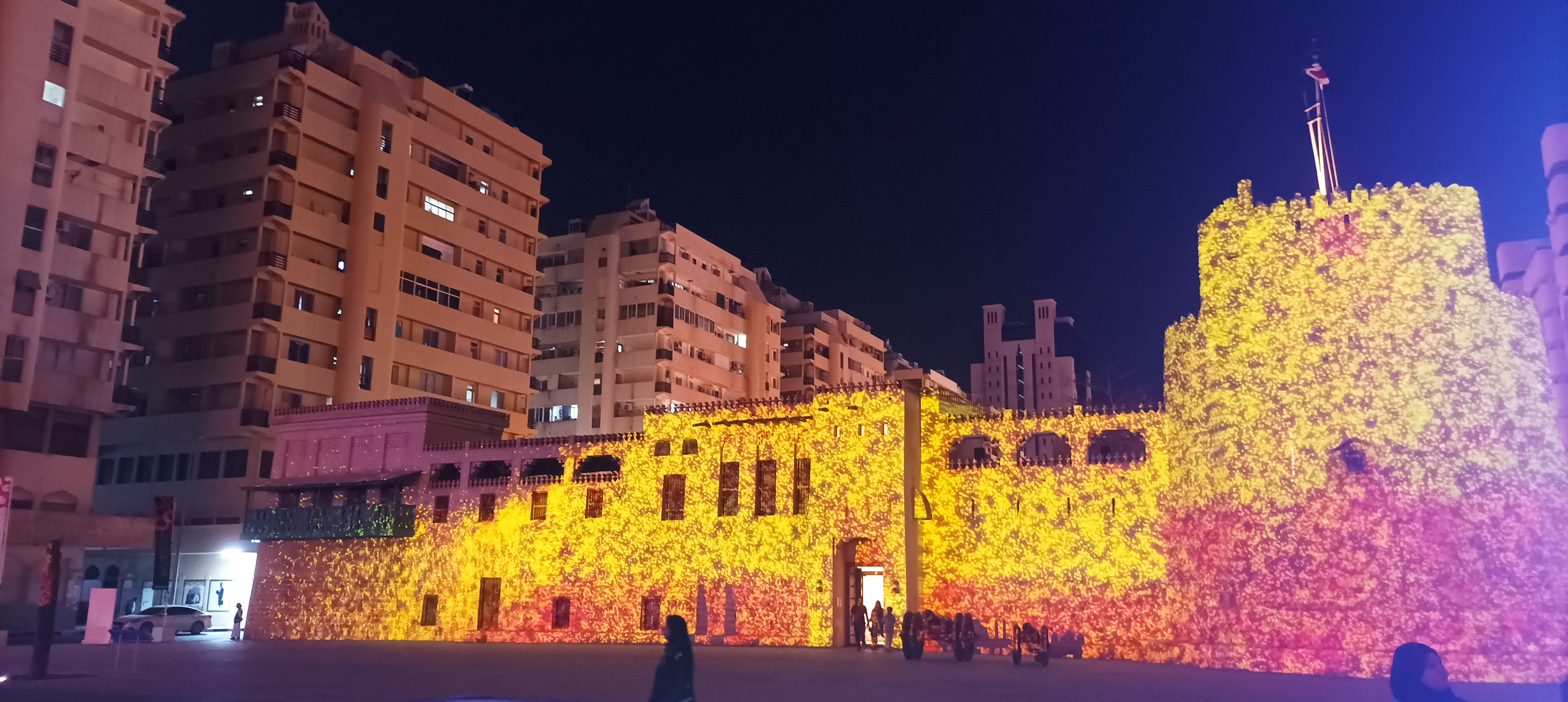
Al-Husn Fort, Rolla, 2023

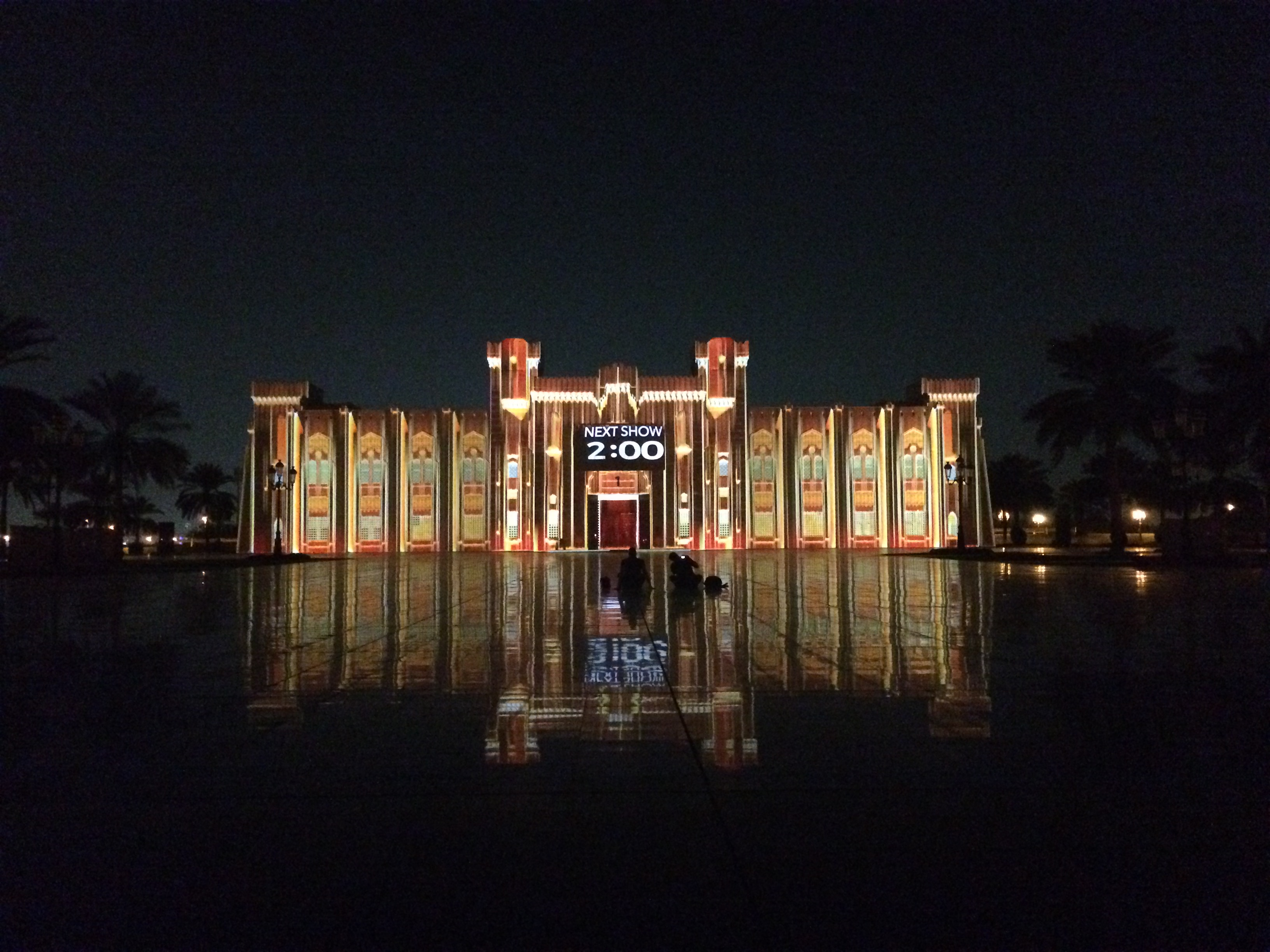
February 2018

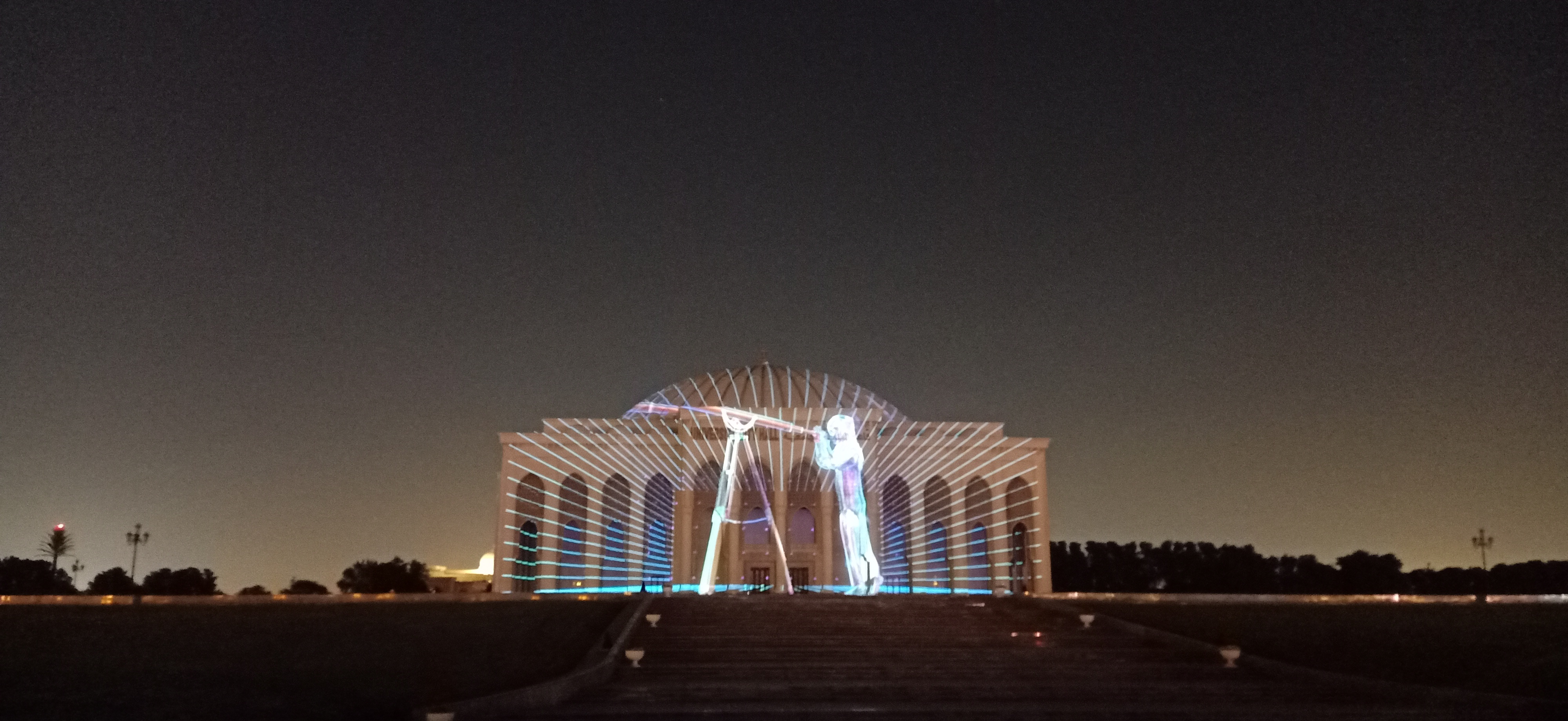
2023

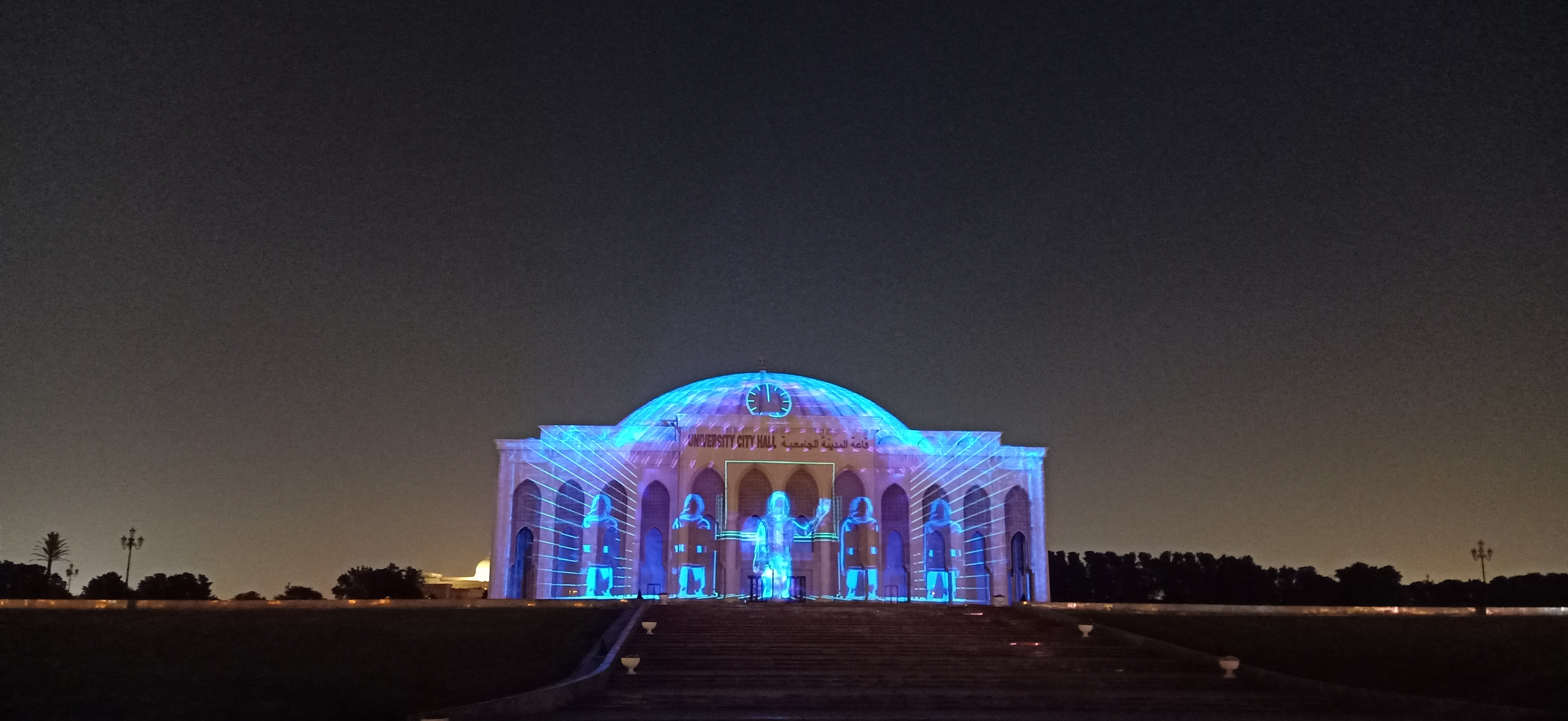
2023

== See also ==
- Culture of the United Arab Emirates
- Middle East
  - Arabian Peninsula
