= Sheikha Salama Mosque =

Mosque in Al Ain, United Arab Emirares

- Masjid Aš-Šaykhah Salāmah (مَسْجِد ٱلشَّيْخَة سَلَامَة)
- The current building in 2020

- Location in the U.A.E. Sheikha Salama Mosque (Persian Gulf) Sheikha Salama Mosque (Middle East) Sheikha Salama Mosque (West and Central Asia)

Religion
- Affiliation: Islam
- Year consecrated: 2011
- Status: Active

Location
- Location: Al Ain
- Municipality: Al Ain City Municipality
- State: Abu Dhabi
- Country: United Arab Emirates
- Territory: Al-Ain
- Coordinates: 24°13′22.54″N 55°45′59.25″E

Architecture
- Architect: Ja'afar Touqan
- Type: Mosque
- Style: Mixed ancient and modern, partly Moroccan

Specifications
- Capacity: About 4,800
- Minaret: 2
- Site area: 35,873 m^{2} (386,130 sq ft)

The Sheikha Salama Mosque (Arabic: مَسْجِد ٱلشَّيْخَة سَلَامَة, romanized: Masjid Aš-Šaykhah Salāmah) is a mosque in the city of Al Ain, Emirate of Abu Dhabi, the United Arab Emirates. Formerly the largest mosque in use in the city, it is named after Sheikhah Salamah, mother of Sheikh Zayed bin Sultan Al Nahyan, the father of Sheikh Khalifa.

== History ==
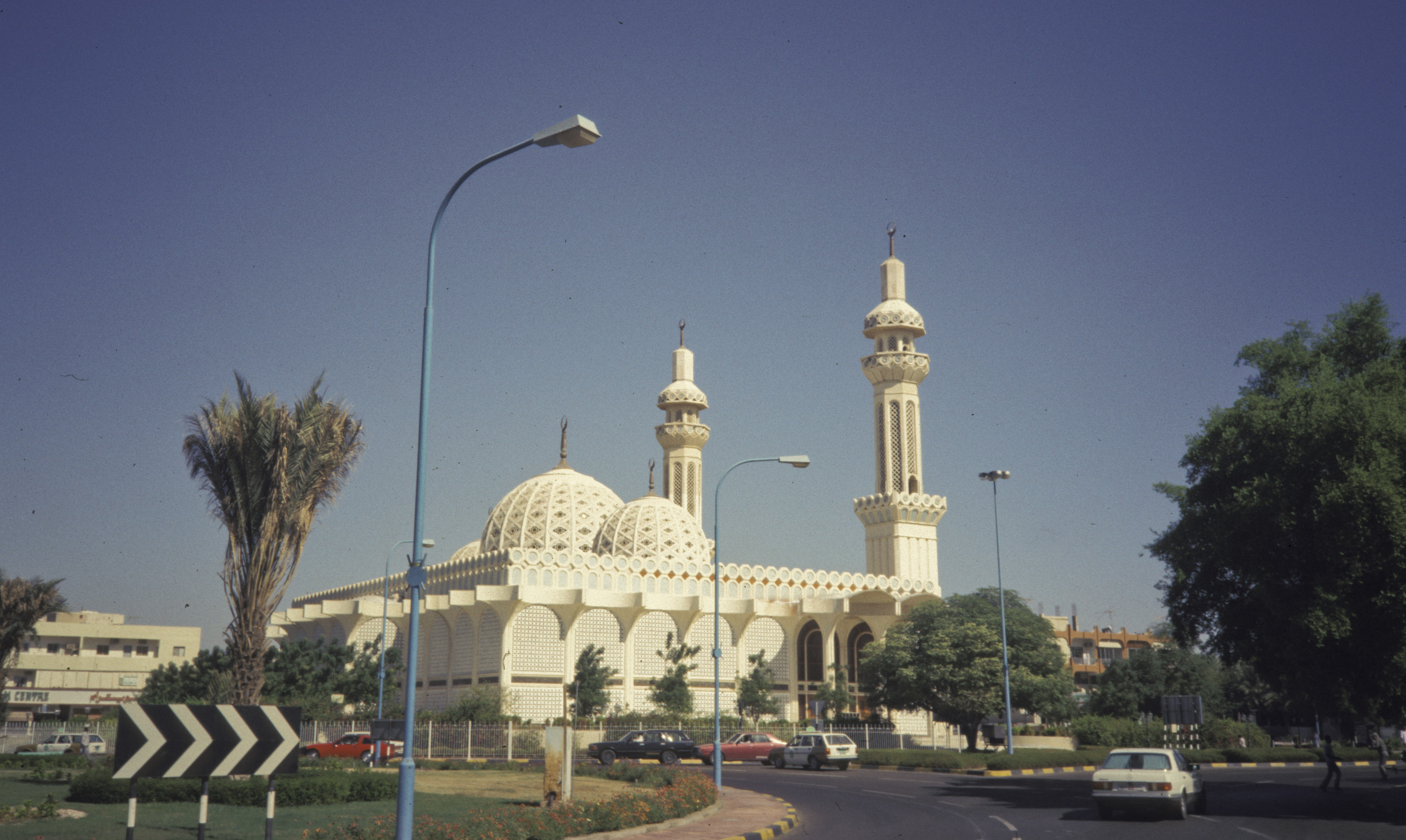
The old building in 1987

The mosque had an old structure which was demolished in 2007. In October of that year, Al Ain City Municipality gave a contract to Aldar Properties to supervise and design the new mosque. The current structure was completed in May 2011.

The mosque won the Saudi Arabian award for architecture in 2017. It used to be the largest mosque in Al Ain, before the Sheikh Khalifa Grand Mosque was completed in 2021.

== Structure ==
The current structure of the mosque, which was designed by architect Ja'afar Touqan from Jordan, is a blend of ancient and modern architecture, with two minarets which are influenced by Moroccan Islamic architecture. It occupies an area of 35,873 square metres (386,130 ft^{2}), and can accommodate more than 3,000 worshipers. The design includes an extra thousand car parking spaces for "future needs."

== See also ==
- Arabian Peninsula
  - Tawam
