= Abu Dhabi City Municipality =

Municipal body concerned with the city of Abu Dhabi, United Arab Emirates

- بلدية مدينة أبوظبي

Agency overview
- Formed: 1962; 64 years ago
- Preceding agency: Department of Abu Dhabi Municipality and Town Planning
- Jurisdiction: Abu Dhabi Central Capital District
- Headquarters: 606 Shk. Zayed Bin Sultan Street, Al Danah, Abu Dhabi
- Agency executive: Ahmed Fadhel Almehairbi, Acting Director-General
- Parent department: Department of Municipalities and Transport
- Website: www.dmt.gov.ae/ADM/

Abu Dhabi City Municipality (ADM) (Arabic: بلدية مدينة أبوظبي, romanized: Baladīyat Madīnat ʾAbū Ẓabī) is the municipal body that has jurisdiction over city services and the upkeep of facilities in Abu Dhabi, United Arab Emirates. Established in 1962 as the Department of Abu Dhabi Municipality and Town Planning, it later became an organ of the newly created Department of Municipalities and Agriculture (now renamed to Department of Municipalities and Transport) in 2005 alongside the Al Ain City Municipality and the Western Region Municipality (now Al Dhafrah Region Municipality).

== History ==
Abu Dhabi City Municipality was established in 1962 during the reign of Sheikh Shakhbut al-Nahyan as the Department of Abu Dhabi Municipality and Town Planning, nine years prior to the unification of the United Arab Emirates in 1971. Its establishment was followed by the Emirate's first oil exports in 1962. In 1969, a royal decree was issued to appoint the first municipal board for the city of Abu Dhabi, with the task of providing comprehensive services to the public and ensure proper planning of the developing city, with regularized road networks, maintenance services, sewerage and lighting works.

In 2005, it was merged with the Department of Municipalities and Agriculture. In 2007, the-then President of the United Arab Emirates Sheikh Khalifa bin Zayed Al Nahyan issued directives for the establishment of the Department of Municipal Affairs which would be responsible for overseeing the Abu Dhabi City Municipality, Al Ain City Municipality and the Western Region Municipality (now Al Dhafrah Region Municipality).
