= General Authority of Islamic Affairs and Endowments =

United Arab Emirates federal agency

- الهيئة العامة للشؤون الاسلامية والاوقاف
- Abbreviation: Awqaf or GAIAE
- Formation: 9 October 2006
- Headquarters: Abu Dhabi, UAE
- Chairman: H.E. Dr. Omar Habtoor Al Darei
- Parent organization: Cabinet of the United Arab Emirates
- Website: www.awqaf.gov.ae/en/

The General Authority of Islamic Affairs and Endowments (GAIAE) or (Awqaf) (Arabic: الهيئة العامة للشؤون الاسلامية والاوقاف) is a federal agency of the government of the United Arab Emirates.

It was founded by a federal decree on 9 October 2006. The Department is also known as Awqaf, and it is responsible for awqaf (in Islamic law, a religious endowment). Islamic affairs are also part of the department's responsibilities in all Emirates of the United Arab Emirates except Dubai, which has its own department; the Islamic Affairs and Charitable Activities Department.

== Establishment ==
The federal General Authority of Islamic Affairs and Endowments (Awqaf) oversee the administration of Sunni mosques, except in Dubai, where they are administered by the Dubai’s Islamic Affairs and Charitable Activities Department (IACAD). The Awqaf distributes weekly guidance and support to Sunni imams regarding the themes and content of khutbah with a published script every week. The khutbahs get posted on its website. The Awqaf applies a three-tier system in which junior imams follows the Awqaf khutbah script closely; midlevel imams prepare sermons according to the topic or subject matter selected by Awqaf authorities; and senior imams have the flexibility to choose their own subject for their khutbah. Some Shia religious leaders in Shia majority mosques choose to follow Awqaf-approved khutbahs, while others write their own khutbah. The government funds and supports Sunni mosques, with the exception of those considered private, and the government employs all Sunni imams as government employees. In comparison, Shia mosques in the UAE are managed by the Jaafari Affairs Council, which oversees mosques and community activities, manages financial affairs, and hires preachers for Shia mosques.

The Awqaf operates official toll-free call centers and text messaging service for fatwas. The fatwas in the United Arab Emirates are available in three languages (Arabic, English, and Urdu). Fatwas are given based on the questions asked and includes areas in worship, business, family, women’s issues, and other Islamic legal issues. Callers explain their question directly to an official mufti, who then issues a fatwa based on Islamic teachings. Both female (muftiya) and male (mufti) religious scholars are available.

== See also ==
- Islamic Affairs and Charitable Activities Department, the Awqaf department in Dubai
- Islam in the United Arab Emirates
