= Abu Dhabi Department of Municipalities and Transport =

Government body of Abu Dhabi, the United Arab Emirates

- دائرة البلديات والنقل

Agency overview
- Formed: 2019
- Preceding agency: Department of Municipalities and Agriculture
- Jurisdiction: Emirate of Abu Dhabi
- Headquarters: 45 Ahl Al 'Azm Street, Al Nahyan, Abu Dhabi
- Agency executives: His Excellency Mohamed Ali Al Shorafa, Chairman; Saif Badr Al Qubaisi, Director General of Abu Dhabi City Municipality; Mohammad Ali Al-Mansouri, Director General of Al Dhafra Region Municipality
- Child agencies: Abu Dhabi City Municipality; Al Ain City Municipality; Al Dhafra Region Municipality; Integrated Transport Centre
- Website: dmt.gov.ae

Abu Dhabi Department of Municipalities and Transport (Arabic: دائرة البلديات والنقل), is a regulatory authority of the Government of Abu Dhabi in the United Arab Emirates that is responsible for overseeing and supervising the regional municipal councils and municipal administrations in the Emirate of Abu Dhabi.

== Responsibilities ==
The Department of Municipalities and Transport (DMT) achieves the general policies of the Abu Dhabi Government by overseeing and regulating the municipal councils and administrations in the emirate. The DMT is responsible for:

- Managing and supervising the operations of municipal services in Abu Dhabi City, Al Ain, and Al Dhafra.
- Overseeing urban planning, transportation, and real estate sectors through affiliate organisations and subsidiaries, including:

- The Integrated Transport Centre (ITC) – which manages transport services under the "Abu Dhabi Mobility" brand.
- The Abu Dhabi Real Estate Centre (ADREC) – focusing on real estate regulation and development.
- The Abu Dhabi Centre for Projects and Infrastructure (ADPIC) – overseeing capital projects worth $16 billion.

- Regulating the engineering and construction sectors in Abu Dhabi through the mandate to supervise the preparation, development, and implementation of the Occupational Safety and Health Management System (OSHMS) in the construction sector. The DMT ensures compliance with the general framework of the Abu Dhabi Occupational Safety and Health System, setting standards for health and safety in the building and construction sectors.

== Key initiatives ==
The DMT is also responsible for liveability and quality-of-life improvements across the emirate, such as:

- The Dream Neighbourhood Survey, which gathers community feedback to shape future urban development.
- The Abu Dhabi Canvas initiative, which promotes public art in urban spaces to showcase UAE heritage and local artists.

== See also ==
- Transportation in the United Arab Emirates
