= Integrated Transport Centre =

Abu Dhabi transport regulatory authority

- مركز النقل المتكامل

Agency overview
- Formed: 15 November 2016; 8 years ago
- Jurisdiction: Emirate of Abu Dhabi
- Headquarters: Abu Dhabi, United Arab Emirates
- Parent department: Department of Municipalities and Transport
- Website: itc.gov.ae

Integrated Transport Centre (ITC; Arabic: مركز النقل المتكامل) is an organ of Department of Municipalities and Transport in the Emirate of Abu Dhabi, United Arab Emirates. It is tasked with overseeing public transport operations and management of parking spaces besides handling a range of other relevant duties like supervising traffic monitoring centers and logistical facilities of freight surface transport. It was established in November 2016 by the then-ruler of Abu Dhabi Sheikh Khalifa.
