= Sheikh Zayed Grand Mosque =

Mosque in Abu Dhabi, UAE

- جَامِع ٱلشَّيْخ زَايِد ٱلْكَبِيْر
- View of the Sheikh Zayed Grand Mosque from the courtyard, 2018

- Location within the UAE Location within the Middle East

Religion
- Affiliation: Islam

Location
- Location: Abu Dhabi
- Country: United Arab Emirates
- Coordinates: 24°24′43.2″N 54°28′26.4″E

Architecture
- Architect: Yusef Abdelki
- Style: Islamic
- Groundbreaking: 1996
- Completed: 2007
- Construction cost: Dhs2 billion (US$545 million)

Specifications
- Capacity: 41,000+
- Length: 420 m (1,380 ft)
- Width: 290 m (950 ft)
- Dome: 82 domes of 7 different sizes
- Dome height (outer): 85 m (279 ft)
- Dome dia. (outer): 32.2 m (106 ft)
- Minaret: 4
- Minaret height: 104 m (341 ft)

Website
- مركز جامع الشيخ زايد الكبير

The Sheikh Zayed Grand Mosque (Arabic: جَامِع ٱلشَّيْخ زَايِد ٱلْكَبِيْر Jāmiʿ Aš-Šaykh Zāyid Al-Kabīr) is a mosque located in Abu Dhabi, the capital city of the United Arab Emirates. It is the country's largest mosque, and is the key place of worship for daily Islamic prayers. There is a smaller replica of this mosque in Surakarta, a city in Indonesia.

The Grand Mosque was constructed between 1994 and 2007 and was inaugurated in December 2007. The building complex measures approximately 290 by 420 m (950 by 1,380 ft), covering an area of more than 12 hectares (30 acres), excluding exterior landscaping and vehicle parking. The main axis of the building is rotated about 12° south of true west, aligning it in the direction of the Kaaba in Mecca, Saudi Arabia.

The project was launched by the late president of the U.A.E., Sheikh Zayed bin Sultan Al Nahyan, who wanted to establish a structure that would unite the cultural diversity of the Islamic world with the historical and modern values of architecture and art. In 2004, Sheikh Zayed died and was buried in the courtyard of the mosque.

Sheikh Zayed Grand Mosque Center (SZGMC) offices are located in the west minarets. SZGMC manages the day-to-day operations and serves as a center of learning and discovery through its educational cultural activities and visitor programs. The library, located in the northeast minaret, serves the community with classic books and publications addressing a range of Islamic subjects: sciences, civilization, calligraphy, the arts, and coins, including some rare publications. The collection comprises material in a broad range of languages, including Arabic, English, French, Italian, Spanish, German, and Korean. For two years running, it was voted the world's second favourite landmark by TripAdvisor.

The Grand Mosque has been a significant destination for visiting foreign leaders during official state visits to the UAE. Notable visitors include Elizabeth II, the then US Vice President Joe Biden, Australian Prime Minister Anthony Albanese. and Indian Prime Minister Narendra Modi.

== Design and construction ==
The mosque was built under the guidance and supervision of Sheikh Zayed, who was buried here after his death in 2004. It features 82 domes, more than 1,000 columns, 24-carat-gold gilded chandeliers and the world's largest hand-knotted carpet. The main prayer hall is dominated by one of the largest chandeliers. The mosque was designed under the management of the Syrian architect Youssef Abdelke, and three other architectural designers from Syria who completed the design and worked on developing it, Basem Barghouti, Moataz Al-Halabi, and Imad Malas.

The mosque's architect Yusef Abdelki took inspiration from a number of sources: the Abu al-Abbas al-Mursi Mosque in Alexandria, designed by Mario Rossi in the 1920s; the Badshahi Mosque in Lahore, Pakistan; and other references of Persian, Mughal, and Indo-Islamic architecture. The dome layout and floorplan of the mosque was inspired by the Badshahi Mosque. Its archways are quintessentially Moorish, and its minarets classically Arab.

In a joint-venture between Italian contractors Impregilo and Rizzani de Eccher, more than 3,000 workers and 38 sub-contracting companies were conscripted in its construction. The mosque was completed under a second contract by a Joint Venture between ACC and Six Construct (part of Belgian company BESIX Group) between 2004 and 2007. Natural materials were chosen for much of its design and construction due to their long-lasting qualities, including marble stone, gold, semi-precious stones, crystals and ceramics. Artisans and materials came from many countries including Syria, especially from Damascus and Aleppo, and some other countries such as India, Italy, Germany, Turkey, Pakistan, Malaysia, Iran, China, United Kingdom, New Zealand, North Macedonia and the U.A.E. The intricate flower mosaics decorating the courtyard was designed by the British artist Kevin Dean, who embraced Sheikh Zayed's passionate vision to create a mosque that unites the world, as he chose flowers from the Middle East, such as Tulips, Lilys, and Irises. As inlays of colored marble form exuberant floral patterns that curl and twist gracefully from the edges towards the center adorn the courtyard. While the rest of the Sahan was inlaid with thousands of small pieces of white marble.

== Dimensions and statistics ==
The mosque is large enough to accommodate over 40,100 worshippers, while the main prayer hall can hold over 7,000. There are two smaller prayer halls, with a capacity of 1,500 each, one of which is the women's prayer hall.

There are four minarets on the four corners of the courtyard which rise about 107 m (351 ft) in height. The courtyard, with its floral design, measures about 17,000 m^{2} (180,000 sq ft), and is considered to be the largest example of marble mosaic in the world. The exterior and interior are adorned with white marble, giving the mosque a serene and majestic appearance. The marble is inlaid with precious stones like lapis lazuli, carnelian, amethyst, abalone shell, and mother of pearl.

Marble used in the construction included:

- Sivec from Prilep, North Macedonia was used on the external cladding (115,119 m^{2} (1,239,130 sq ft) of cladding has been used on the mosque, including the minarets)
- Lasa from Laas, South Tyrol, Italy was used in the internal elevations
- Makrana from Makrana, India was used in the annexes and offices
- Acquabianca and Bianco P from Italy
- East White and Ming Green from China

To compare, the King Faisal Mosque of Sharjah, formerly the largest mosque in Sharjah and country, measures 10,000–12,000 m^{2} (110,000–130,000 sq ft).

== Architectural features ==
The carpet in the hall is considered by many to be the world's largest carpet made by Iran's Carpet Company and designed by Iranian artist Ali Khaliqi. It measures 5,627 m^{2} (60,570 sq ft), and was made by around 1,200-1,300 carpet knotters. The weight of this carpet is 35 ton and is predominantly made from wool (originating from New Zealand and Iran). There are 2,268,000,000 knots within the carpet and it took approximately two years to complete. The Grand Mosque has seven imported chandeliers from the company Faustig in Munich, Germany that incorporate millions of Swarovski crystals. The largest chandelier is the second largest known chandelier inside a mosque, the third largest in the world, and has a 10 m (33 ft) diameter and a 15 m (49 ft) height.

The pools along the arcades reflect the mosque's columns, which become illuminated at night. The unique lighting system was designed by lighting architects Speirs and Major Associates to reflect the phases of the moon. Beautiful bluish gray clouds are projected in lights onto the external walls and get brighter and darker according to the phase of the moon.

The 96 columns in the main prayer hall are clad with marble and inlaid with mother of pearl, one of the few places where one can see this craftsmanship.

The 99 names (qualities or attributes) of God (Allah) are featured on the Qibla wall in traditional Kufic calligraphy, designed by the prominent UAE calligrapher — Mohammed Mandi Al Tamimi. The Qibla wall also features subtle fibre-optic lighting, which is integrated as part of the organic design.

In total, three calligraphy styles — Naskhi, Thuluth and Kufic — are used throughout the mosque and were drafted by Mohammed Mandi Al Tamimi of the UAE, Farouk Haddad of Syria and Mohammed Allam of Jordan.

View from Wahat Al Karama

Exterior

Water mirror and columns

Inner courtyard with minaret

Interior of the main prayer hall

The mosque in 2022

The mosque at night

Outside of the Sheikh Zayed Grand Mosque (left)

Mosque walkway

Sheikh Zayed Grand Mosque At Night

== See also ==
- List of mosques in the United Arab Emirates
- List of cultural property of national significance in the United Arab Emirates
  - Qasr Al Watan
  - The Founder's Memorial
- Sultan Qaboos Grand Mosque
- Sheikh Zayed Mosque, Fujairah
- Zayed bin Sultan Al Nahyan's Mosque in Stockholm, Sweden
- Emir Abdelkader Mosque
