= Al Ain City Municipality =

Municipal body concerned with the city of Al Ain, United Arab Emirates

- بلدية مدينة العين

Agency overview
- Formed: 1967; 59 years ago
- Preceding agency: Al Ain Municipality Town Planning Department
- Jurisdiction: Al Ain Region, Emirate of Abu Dhabi
- Headquarters: 455 Al Baladiyyah Street, Al Jimi, Al Ain, Emirate of Abu Dhabi
- Agency executive: Ali Khalifa Al Qamzy, General Manager
- Parent department: Department of Municipalities and Transport
- Website: dmt.gov.ae/aam

Al Ain City Municipality (AAM) (Arabic: بلدية مدينة العين), is the municipal body that has jurisdiction over city services and the upkeep of facilities in Al Ain, United Arab Emirates. Established in 1967 as the Al Ain Municipality Town Planning Department (TPD), it later became an organ of the newly created Department of Municipalities and Agriculture (now renamed to Department of Municipalities and Transport) alongside the Abu Dhabi City Municipality and the Western Region Municipality in 2005.

== History ==
Al Ain City Municipality was established in 1967 as Al Ain Municipality Town Planning Department, almost four years before the unification of the United Arab Emirates. In 2005, it was merged with the Department of Municipalities and Agriculture. In 2007, the-then President of the United Arab Emirates Sheikh Khalifa bin Zayed Al Nahyan issued directives for establishment of the Department of Municipal Affairs which would be responsible for overseeing the Abu Dhabi City Municipality, Al Ain City Municipality and the Western Region Municipality.
