= Islam in the United Arab Emirates =

Sheikh Zayed Grand Mosque in Abu Dhabi.

Islam is the official religion of the United Arab Emirates. Of the total population, 76.9% are Muslims as of a 2010 estimate by the Pew Research Center. Most of them belong to the Sunni branch of Islam adhering to the Maliki school of jurisprudence. Media estimates suggest less than 20 percent of the noncitizen Muslim population are Shia.

== History ==
The arrival of envoys from the Islamic prophet Muhammad in 632 heralded the conversion of the region to Islam. After prophet Muhammad's death, one of the major battles of the Ridda Wars was fought at Dibba, to the east coast of the present-day Emirates. The defeat of the non-Muslims, including Laqit bin Malik Al-Azdi, in this battle resulted in the triumph of Islam in the Arabian Peninsula.

The Bani Yas, which today form the Emirate of Abu Dhabi and Emirate of Dubai, traditionally adhere to the Sunni Maliki school of Islamic jurisprudence from the Uyunid dynasty, who spread the Maliki school by the command of Sheikh Abdullah bin Ali Al Uyuni. As such, the Maliki school remains the UAE's dominant school of thought and is sometimes used in legal sharia rulings.

== Structure ==
The federal General Authority of Islamic Affairs and Endowments (Awqaf) oversee the administration of Sunni mosques, except in Dubai, where they are administered by the Dubai's Islamic Affairs and Charitable Activities Department (IACAD). The Awqaf distributes weekly guidance to Sunni imams regarding the themes and content of khutbah with a published script every week. The khutbas get posted on the Awqaf website. The Awqaf applies a three-tier system in which junior imams follows the Awqaf khutbah script closely; midlevel imams prepare khutbas according to the topic or subject matter selected by Awqaf authorities; and senior imams have the flexibility to choose their own subject for their khutbas. Some Shia religious leaders in Shia majority mosques choose to follow Awqaf-approved weekly addresses, while others write their own khutbah. The government funds and supports Sunni mosques, with the exception of those considered private, and employs all Sunni imams as employees.

Islamic studies are mandatory for all students in public schools and for Muslim students in private schools. The government-funded public schools do not provide instruction in any religion other than Islam. In private schools, non-Muslim students are not required to attend Islamic study classes. As an alternative, private schools are available for non-Muslims. Christian-affiliated schools are authorized to provide instruction tailored to the religious background of the student such as Christian instruction for Christian students, and ethics or other religions.

The Awqaf operates official toll-free call centers and text messaging service for fatwas. The fatwas in the United Arab Emirates are available in three languages (Arabic, English, and Urdu). Fatwas are given based on the questions asked and includes fatwas in areas of belief and worship, business, family, women's issues, and other issues. Callers explain their question directly to an official mufti, who then issue a fatwa based on the caller's question. Both female (muftiya) and male (mufti) religious scholars are available.

For Muslims, the Sharia is the principal source of legislation. However, the judicial system allows for different types of law, depending on the case. Sharia forms the basis for judicial decisions in most family law matters for Muslims, such as marriage and divorce, and inheritance for Muslims. However, in the case of non-Muslims and noncitizens, the laws of their home country apply, rather than Sharia. The law does not directly prohibit Muslims from converting to other religions; however, the penal code defers to Sharia on matters defined as crimes in Islamic doctrine, which in many interpretations prohibits apostasy.

== Shia ==
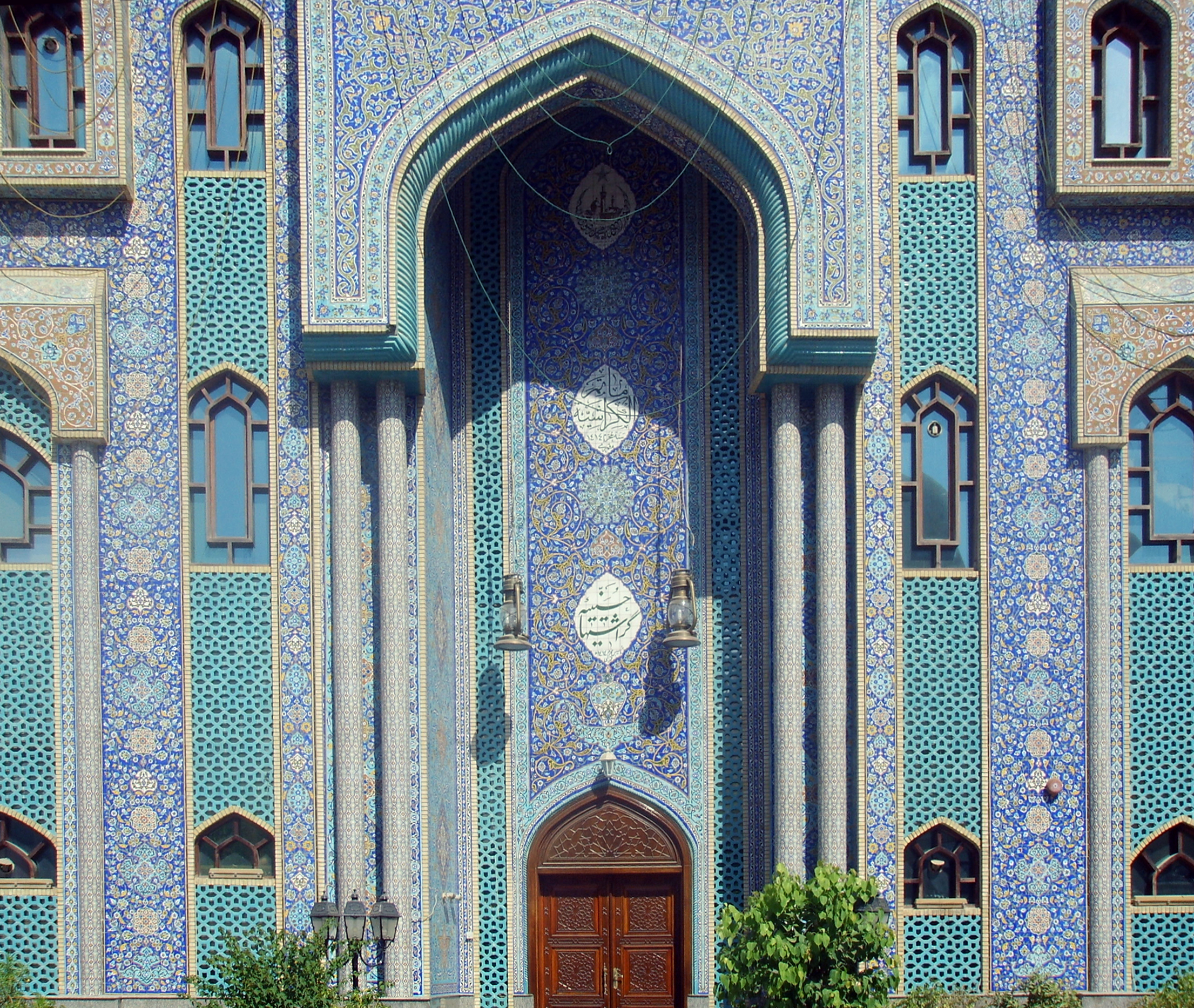
The Iranian Shia Mosque in Dubai.

The Jaafari Affairs Council manages the Shia affairs for all of the country, including overseeing mosques and endowments. The council also issues additional instructions on khutbas to Shia mosques. The government does not appoint religious leaders for Shia mosques. Shia adherents worship and maintain their own mosques and the government considers Shia mosques to be private. However, Shia mosques are eligible to receive funding from the government upon request. The government allows Shia mosques to broadcast the Shia adhan from their minarets. Shia Muslims have their own council, the Jaafari Affairs Council, to manage Shia affairs, including overseeing mosques and community activities, managing financial affairs, and hiring preachers. The government permits Shia Muslims to observe Ashura in private gatherings, but not in public rallies.

Shia Islam is practiced by approximately 5-10% of Emiratis. It is also practiced among expatriate Muslim communities living in the country, most notably Iranians, as well as some Arabs, Pakistanis, Indians, and other nationalities. Non-Twelver Shia branches such as Ismailis and the Dawoodi Bohras are also present.

== Month of Ramadan ==
During the month of Ramadan, it is illegal to publicly eat, drink, chew or smoke between dawn and sunset. Exceptions are made for pregnant women, children, and diabetics or anyone else who cannot fast. The law applies to both Muslims and non-Muslims, and failure to respect the Islamic tradition results in fines. Designated cafes and restaurants operate in the morning but with decreased operation hours and cater to non-Muslims or people who are not fasting.

== See also ==
- Religion in the United Arab Emirates
- Islam by country
