= List of World Heritage Sites in the United Arab Emirates =

Location of World Heritage Sites in United Arab Emirates

The United Nations Educational, Scientific and Cultural Organization (UNESCO) designates World Heritage Sites of outstanding universal value to cultural or natural heritage which have been nominated by countries which are signatories to the UNESCO World Heritage Convention, established in 1972. Cultural heritage consists of monuments (such as architectural works, monumental sculptures, or inscriptions), groups of buildings, and sites (including archaeological sites). Natural features (consisting of physical and biological formations), geological and physiographical formations (including habitats of threatened species of animals and plants), and natural sites which are important from the point of view of science, conservation or natural beauty, are defined as natural heritage. United Arab Emirates accepted the convention on 11 May 2001, making its historical sites eligible for inclusion on the list.

As of 2026, The United Arab Emirates has three World Heritage Sites. The Cultural Sites of Al Ain (Hafit, Hili, Bidaa Bint Saud and Oases Areas) was the first site inscribed in the United Arab Emirates. It is a cultural site. In 2026, the United Arab Emirates most recent site, the Wadi Wurayah, was inscribed for its natural value. The United Arab Emirates has served on the World Heritage Committee once, from 2009 to 2013.

== World Heritage Sites ==
UNESCO lists sites under ten criteria; each entry must meet at least one of the criteria. Criteria i through vi are cultural, and vii through x are natural.

World Heritage Sites
Site	Image	Location (emirate)	Year listed	UNESCO data	Description
Cultural Sites of Al Ain (Hafit, Hili, Bidaa Bint Saud and Oases Areas)		Emirate of Abu Dhabi	2011	1343; iii, iv, v (cultural)	Situated in a desert region, Al Ain has been occupied since the Neolithic period, hosting stone tombs from the 3rd millennium BCE, wells, adobe constructions and one of the oldest examples of the aflaj irrigation system at Bidaa Bint Saud.
Faya Palaeolandscape		Emirate of Sharjah	2025	1735; iii, iv (cultural)	
Wadi Wurayah	A mountainous desert landscape	Emirate of Fujairah	2026	1724; ix (natural)	

== Tentative list ==
In addition to sites inscribed on the World Heritage List, member states can maintain a list of tentative sites that they may consider for nomination. Nominations for the World Heritage List are only accepted if the site was previously listed on the tentative list. As of 2026, the United Arab Emirates has listed fifteen properties on its tentative list.

Tentative sites
Site	Image	Location (emirate)	Year listed	UNESCO criteria	Description
Settlement and Cemetery of Umm an-Nar Island		Emirate of Abu Dhabi	2012	(cultural)	
Sir Bu Nair Island		Emirate of Sharjah	2012	(natural)	
Khor Dubai		Emirate of Dubai	2012	ii, iii, v (cultural)	
Ed-Dur Site		Emirate of Umm Al Quwain	2012	(cultural)	
Al Bidya Mosque		Emirate of Fujairah	2012	(cultural)	
Sharjah: the Gate to Trucial States		Emirate of Sharjah	2014	v (cultural)	
Abu Dhabi Sabkha		Emirate of Abu Dhabi	2018	viii (natural)	
The Cultural Landscape of Dhayah		Emirate of Ras Al Khaimah	2020	v (cultural)	
The pearl trading town of Jazirat Al-Hamra		Emirate of Ras Al Khaimah	2020	iii, v (cultural)	
Trading town of Julfar		Emirate of Ras Al Khaimah	2020	iii, iv, v (cultural)	
Shimal		Emirate of Ras Al Khaimah	2020	i, ii, iii, iv, v (cultural)	
Wadi Al Helo: Testimony of Bronze Age Copper Production		Emirate of Sharjah	2023	iii, iv, v (cultural)	
The Rock Art of the Emirate of Sharjah		Emirate of Sharjah	2023	ii, iii (cultural)	
Mleiha, Late Pre-Islamic Center of a South-East Arabian Kingdom		Emirate of Sharjah	2023	ii, iii, iv (cultural)	
Hatta Archaeological Landscape (Emirate of Dubai)		Emirate of Dubai	2023	iii, v (cultural)	
