= Wadi Zikt =

Wadi in the UAE

Wadi Zikt Wādī Zikt
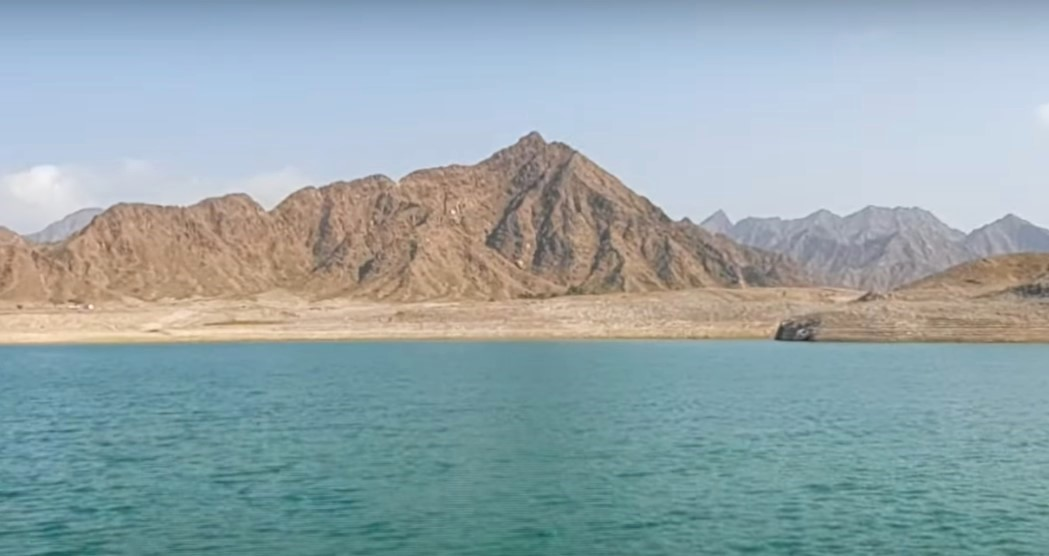
- Wadi Zikt Dam Reservoir

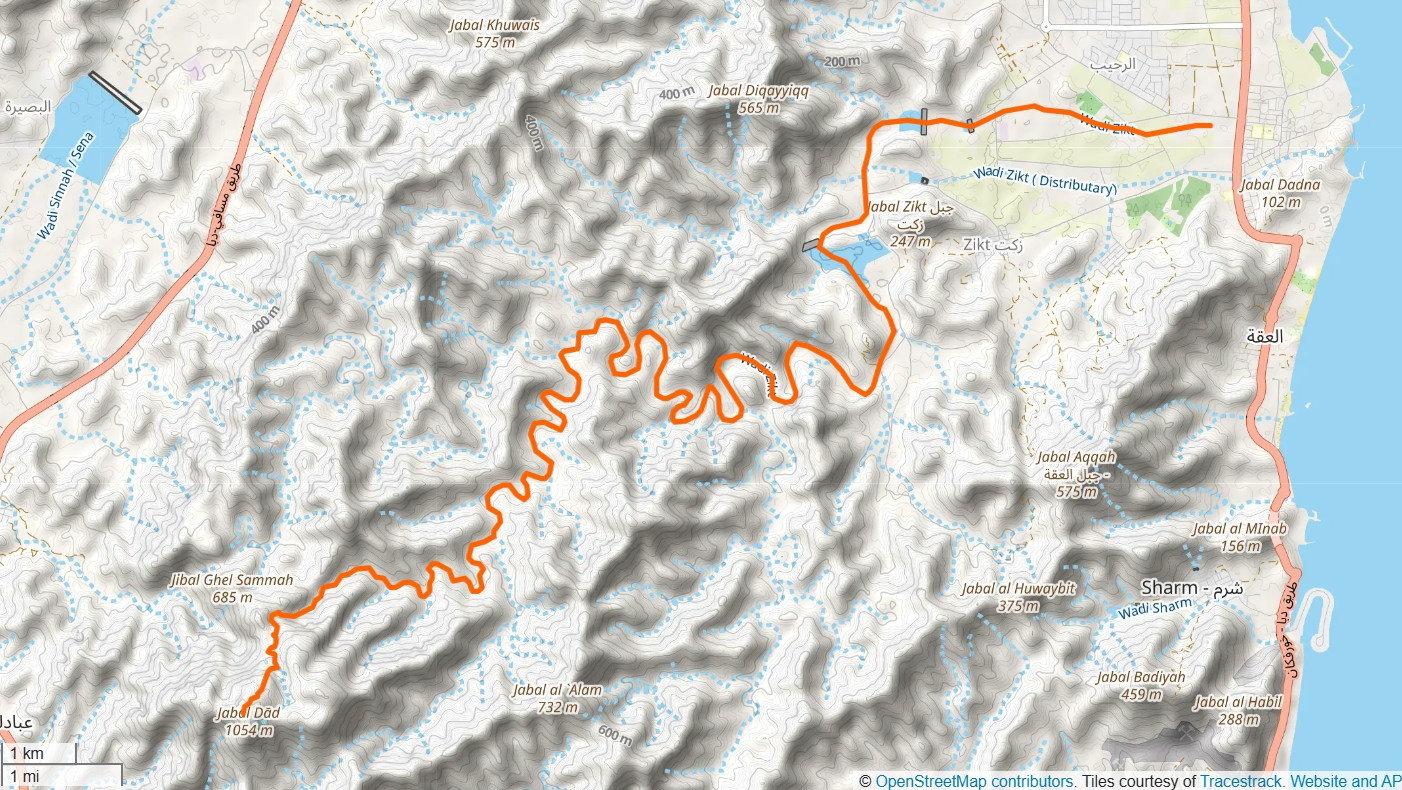
- Location and course of Wadi Zikt

- Location within United Arab Emirates Location within Persian Gulf Location within West and Central Asia
- Native name: وادي زكت (Arabic)

Location
- Country: United Arab Emirates
- Emirate: Fujairah

Physical characteristics
- Source: Northern slope of Jabal Dad (1,054 m (3,458 ft))
  - elevation: 1,020 m (3,350 ft) (approximately)
- Mouth: City of Dadna / Ḑadnā, in the Gulf of Oman.
  - coordinates: 25°31′30.8″N 56°21′03.9″E
  - elevation: 0 m (0 ft)
- Length: 31 km (19 mi)
- Basin size: 92 km^{2} (36 mi^{2})

Basin features
- Progression: Wadi. Intermittent flow
- River system: Wadi Zikt

Wadi Zikt (Arabic: وادي زكت, romanized: Wādī Zikt) is a dry river valley or river with ephemeral or intermittent flow, which flows almost exclusively during the rainy season, located in the northeast of the United Arab Emirates, in the Emirate of Fujairah.

It forms its own drainage basin, covering an approximate area of 92 km^{2} (36 mi^{2}) which limits to the north and west with that of Wadi Basseirah / Al Maksar; to the south with that of Wadi Wurayah; and to the east by the smaller basins of Wadi Sharm and Wadi al Huwaybit / Wādī Liḩwе̄biţ.

The main wadi, which gives its name to the entire river basin, is the Wadi Zikt, with numerous tributaries and sub-tributaries that together represent approximately 295 independent streams, most of them without known names, all classified into five grades or levels according to the Horton-Strahler numbering, forming an important drainage system, which has a length total of 434 km (270 mi).

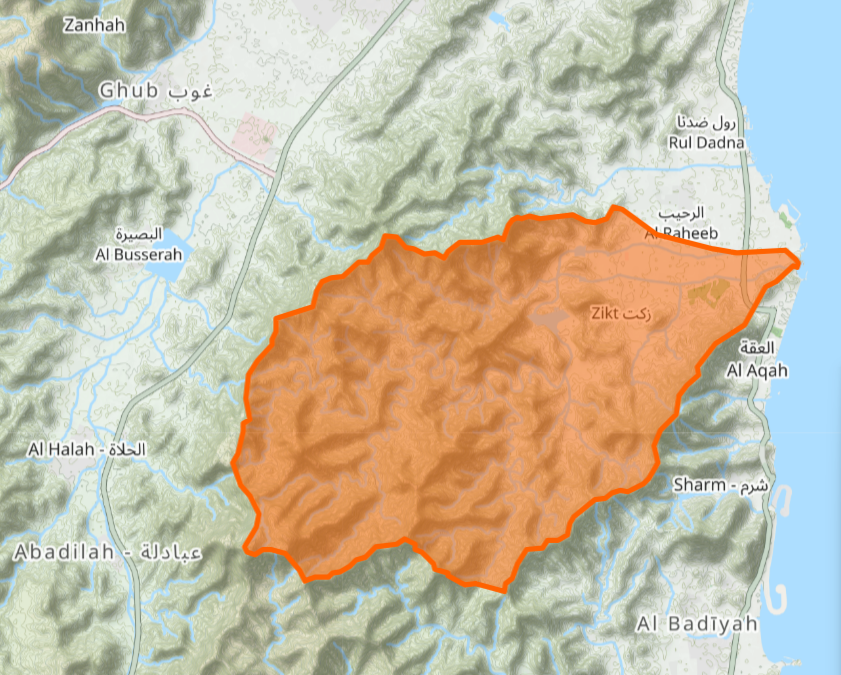
The drainage basin of Wadi Zikt. It includes all its tributaries and the watershed area downstream of the dam, up to its mouth in the Gulf of Oman

Considering the fifth-degree segment of the Wadi Zikt, its principal fourth-degree tributary on the left, a segment of a third-degree sub-tributary, and at the upper course a second and a first degree sub-tributaries, according to the Horton-Strahler number, the length of the resulting wadi is 31 km (19 mi), and places its highest river source at an altitude of 1,020 m (3,350 ft), on the northern slope and a very short distance from the summit of Jabal Dad (1,054 m (3,458 ft)), also known as Jabal Adhan.

Along its course, the wadi forms deeply excavated channels and thick gravel terraces, and zigzags between the steep hills of the Shimayyliyah massif, of low elevation, composed almost entirely of harzburgite, with a very steep and rugged relief, which generally culminates in narrow, rocky peaks. Harzburgite is easily weathered at the ground surface, and the sparsely vegetated slopes are often littered with small, eroded chips, making for treacherous climbs.

Unlike its similarly sized southern neighbour, the Wadi Wurayah, known for its permanent waterfall and wet gorges upstream, no permanent surface water has yet been discovered in Wadi Zikt.

== Dams and reservoirs ==
As in other regions of the UAE, the coastal area of Fujairah has occasionally been affected by unusually heavy rainfall and flooding.

To prevent the danger of flash floods and increase the potential for groundwater recharge, a dam was built in 1992 on the Wadi Zikt riverbed, 18 m (59 ft) high, with a reservoir of 1.6 km^{2} (0.62 mi^{2}) and a capacity of 3.5 million cubic metres, officially named Zikt / Al Rahib Dam (coordinates: 25°30′40″N, 56°17′57″E), although some media refer to it as Al Owais Dam. Five hundred metres east of the dam, on the right side of the reservoir, a channel about 150 m (490 ft) wide was cut through the rock, as a means of ensuring that water levels do not overflow and destroy the structure of the dam, through which the waters of the reservoir are released, resuming their course downstream of the dam.

Also in 1992, three gabion barriers were built to capture overflow from the main dam: Wadi Zikt -1 (Breaker), 330 m (1,080 ft) long and 5.3 m (17 ft) high (coordinates: 25°31′32″N, 56°18′50″E); the Wadi Zikt -2 (Breaker), 162 m (531 ft) long and 2.6 m (8.5 ft) high (coordinates: 25°31′31″N, 56°19′12″E); and a third 50 m (160 ft) long and 1.9 m (6.2 ft) high.

In 2002, part of the course of the Wadi Zikt was diverted to the right of the channel, 1.3 km (0.81 mi) downstream of the main dam, to form a distributary, spreading water to an additional reservoir, and another dam was built on the outflow channel, 8 m (26 ft) high, with a reservoir of 0.03 km^{2} (0.012 mi^{2}) and a capacity of 0.052 million cubic meters, called Dadnah Dam (coordinates: 25°31′7″N, 56°18′50″E).

== Archaeological sites ==
In the lower course of the wadi, already in the Sayh Dadna alluvial plain, 1.5 km (0.93 mi) east of the dam and only 350 m (1,150 ft) south of the summit of Jabal Zikt (247 m (810 ft)), are the ruins of the ancient village of Zikt, which have been fenced and closed to the public as an archaeological site.

Kufic calligraphy and footprints have been found here, and it is a potential source of new archaeological finds.

The new settlement of Zikt is nearby.

== The protected mountain area, the National Park, the Ramsar site and the Biosphere Reserve ==
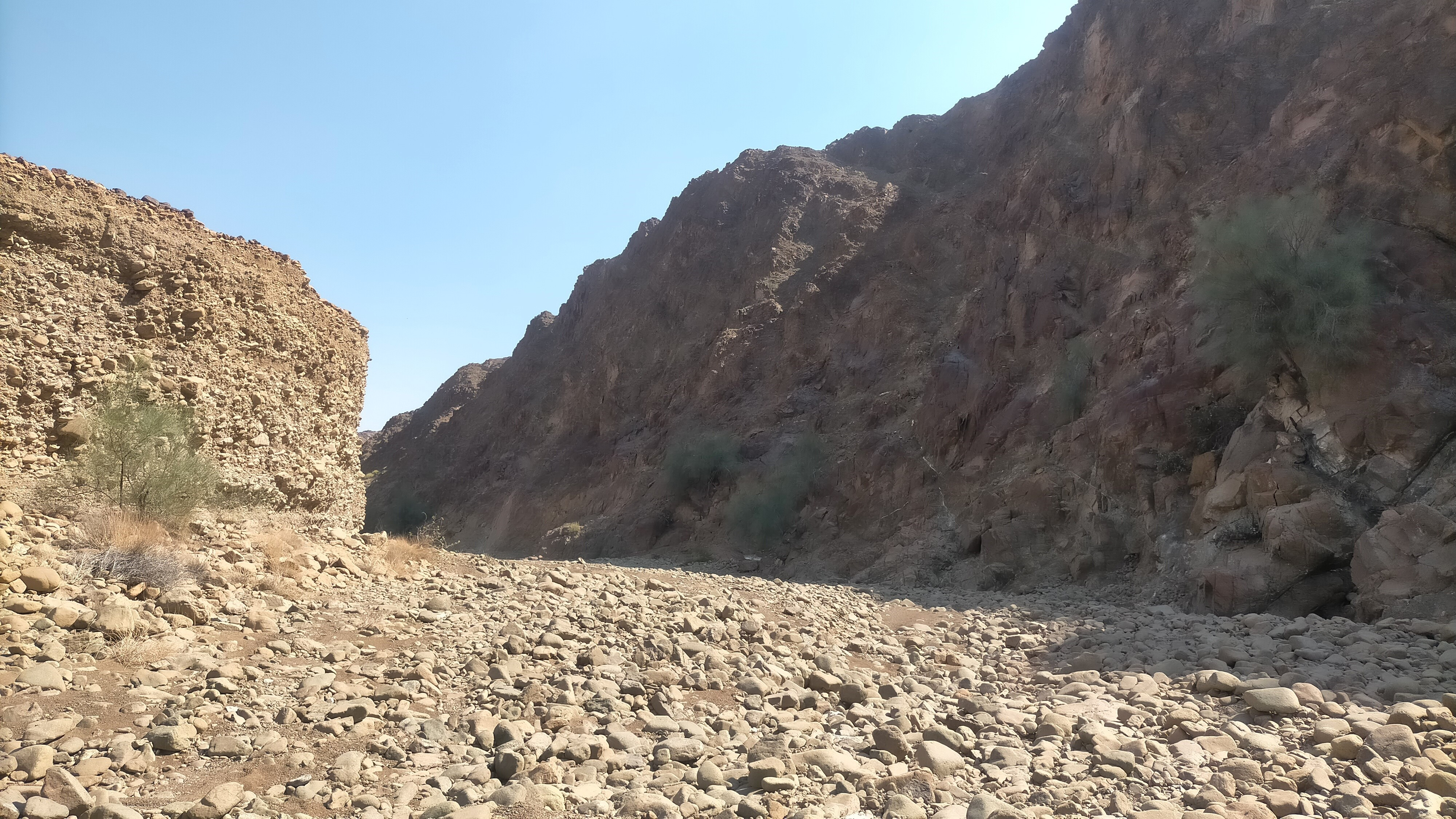
Wadi Zikt - Emirate of Fujairah (UAE) - Lower course of the Wadi Zikt. Wadi Zikt is part of the Wadi Wurayah National Park

Although, with the exception of the surrounding area around the dam, the Wadi Zikt drainage basin has not been affected by the massive influx of tourists and visitors, the authorities of the Emirate of Fujairah decided in 2009 to incorporate most of this basin, especially the southern area, to a protected mountain area to protect the ecological integrity of this freshwater ecosystem, exclude exploitation or occupation that is not compatible with the purposes of conservation of the natural area, and provide a basis for scientific research, educational and recreational activities compatible with the conservation of the natural environment, adopting the following measures:

- In 2009, a Decree issued by the Government of Fujairah declared a large area of 219 km^{2} (85 mi^{2}) a protected mountain area, belonging to the Emirate of Fujairah, which comprises most of the Wadi Wurayah and Wadi Zikt drainage basins; as well as the upper reaches of the basin and neighbouring sub-basins of Wadi Siji, Wadi Abadilah (part of the Wadi Basseirah / Al Maksar basin) and others, as a buffer zone.

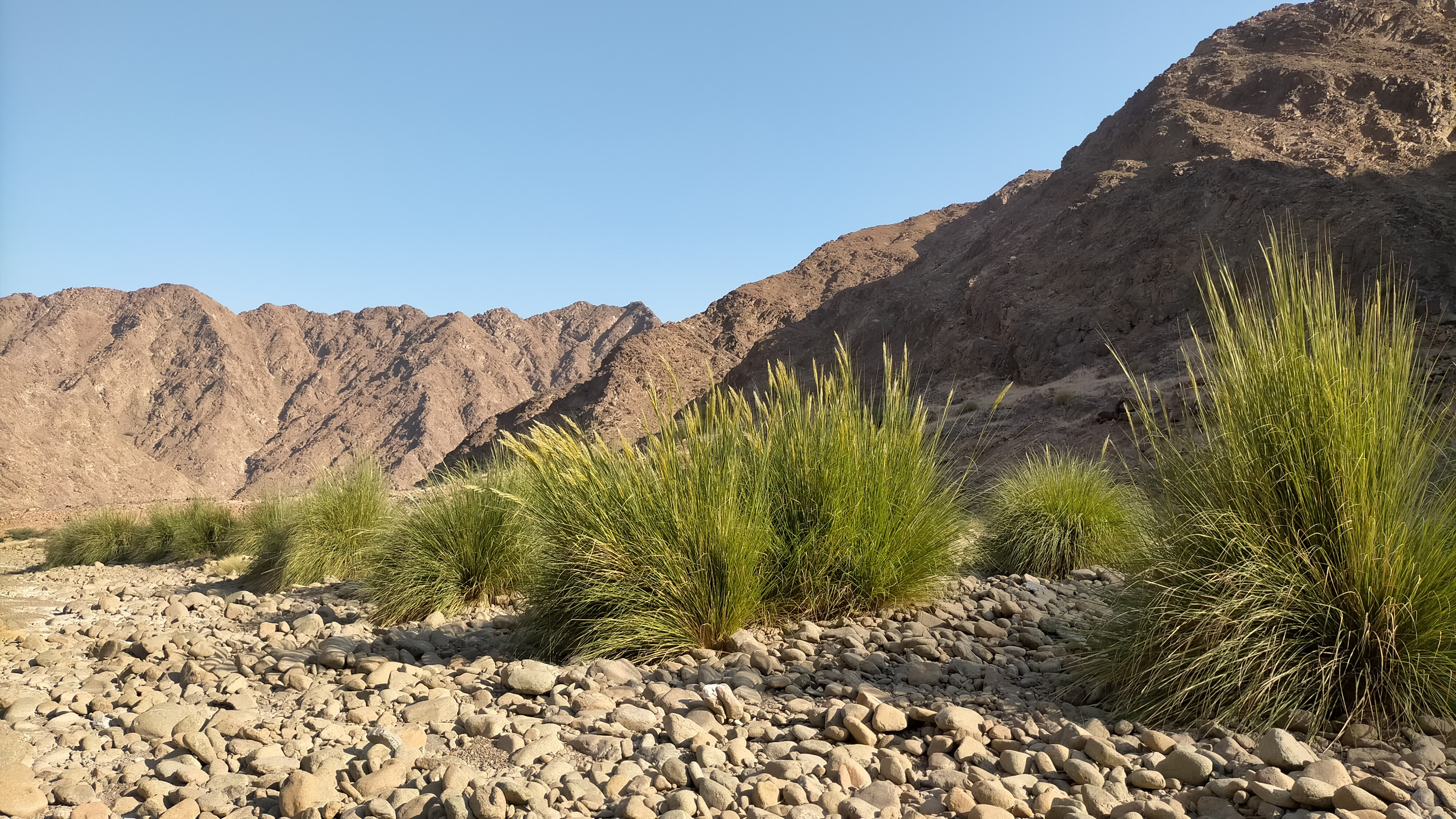
Wadi Zikt - Emirate of Fujairah (UAE) - Lower course. Wadi Zikt is part of the Wadi Wurayah National Park

- In November 2010, the same area was declared a Ramsar site of the United Arab Emirates. Although the inclusion in the Ramsar Convention on wetlands does not in itself guarantee protection. With this declaration the area was incorporated into the list of sites in the world recognized as being of “international importance” (Secretariat of the Ramsar Convention, 2006).
- In January 2013, the municipality of Fujairah established the Wadi Wurayah National Park with the same previous boundaries (omitting in its title the name of Wadi Zikt which nevertheless provides a considerable part of the park's surface). In December 2013 the park was closed to the public to allow for the rehabilitation, development and restoration of its flora and fauna. Since then, the area remains closed to the public, for leisure or recreational activities.
- In July 2018, the United Nations Educational, Scientific and Cultural Organization (UNESCO) designated the area as a Biosphere Reserve.
- In 2022, Fujairah's Wadi Wurayah National Park (once again omitting the name Wadi Zikt) was added to the UAE's provisional list of nominations for UNESCO World Heritage status.

== Toponymy ==
The name of Wadi Zikt (spelled Wādī Zikt), its tributaries, mountains and nearby towns was recorded in the documentation and maps produced between 1950 and 1960 by the British Arabist, cartographer, military officer and diplomat Julian F. Walker, during the work carried out to establish borders between the then called Trucial States, later completed by the Ministry of Defence of the United Kingdom, on 1:100,000 scale maps published in 1971.

It also appears, with the spelling Wadi Zikt, on the map published in 1957 by the US Army Corps of Engineers.

In the National Atlas of the United Arab Emirates it appears with the spelling Wādī Al Ghе̄l.

== Population ==
The area of Wadi Zikt was populated mainly by the Sharqiyin tribe, corresponding to the tribal section of Hamudiyin.

In the work of the diplomat and British historian John Gordon Lorimer, published in 1908 Gazetteer of the Persian Gulf, Oman and Central Arabia, refers to Dadna / Dhadnah, at the mouth of Wadi Zikt, describing it as a village situated on the coast, 15 miles north of Khor Fakkan, with 50 Sharqiyin houses; having 3 fishing boats, a few camels and donkeys, 100 cows, 100 sheep and goats, and about 500 date palms.

== See also ==
- List of wadis of the United Arab Emirates
- List of mountains in the United Arab Emirates
- List of wadis of Oman
- List of mountains in Oman
