= Rugaylat =

- Location within United Arab Emirates
- Coordinates: 25°7′0″N 56°21′0″E
- Country: United Arab Emirates
- Emirate: (Emirate of Fujairah) Fujairah
- Elevation: 20 m (66 ft)

Rugaylat is a suburb of the city of Fujairah in the United Arab Emirates. The site of a small port, the area has seen a number of drownings of unwary swimmers.
