= Wadi Sharm =

Wadi in the UAE

Wadi Sharm Wādī Sharm
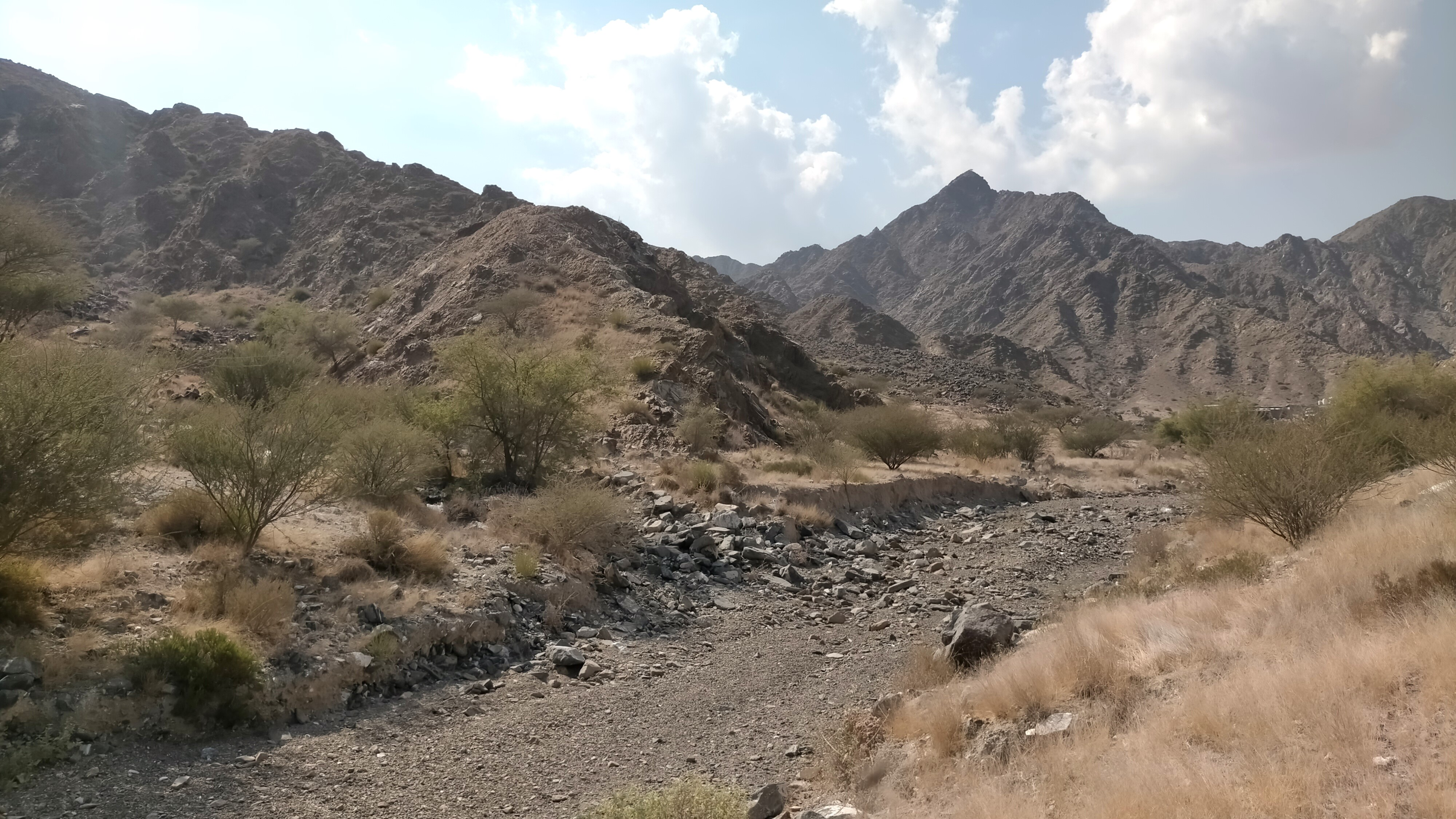

- Location within United Arab Emirates Location within Persian Gulf Location within West and Central Asia
- Native name: وادي شرم (Arabic)

Location
- Country: United Arab Emirates
- Emirate: Fujairah

Physical characteristics
- Source: Northwestern slope of Jabal Badiyah (459 m (1,506 ft))
  - elevation: 370 m (1,210 ft) (approximately)
- Mouth: Coastal and port area of the city of Sharm, in the Gulf of Oman.
  - coordinates: 25°27′57.4″N 56°21′41.8″E
  - elevation: 0 m (0 ft)
- Length: 4 km (2.5 mi)
- Basin size: 6 km^{2} (2.3 mi^{2})

Basin features
- River system: Wadi Sharm

Wadi Sharm (Arabic: وادي شرم, romanized: Wādī Sharm) is a valley or dry river with flow ephemeral or intermittent, flowing almost exclusively during the rainy season, located in the northeast of the United Arab Emirates, in the Emirate of Fujairah.

It forms its own drainage basin, covering an area of approximately 6 km^{2} (2.3 mi^{2}), bordered to the north by the Wadi al Huwaybit / Wādī Liḩwе̄biţ; to the west by the Wadi Zikt and Wadi Wurayah, and to the south by Al Bidiyah.

The wadi originates on the northwestern slope of Jabal Badiyah (459 m (1,506 ft)), and runs towards the coast, from southwest to east, zigzagging between steep, low hills, composed almost entirely of harzburgite, with a very steep and rugged relief.

On its course, the Wadi Sharm passes through the small town of Sharm (Sha'biyyah Sharm).

== Floods, dams and reservoirs ==
As in other regions of the UAE, the coastal area of Sharm has occasionally been affected by unusually heavy rainfall and flooding.

Flooding was particularly severe on March 23, 2009, following heavy rains and the collapse of the old earthen dam at the Wadi Sharm.

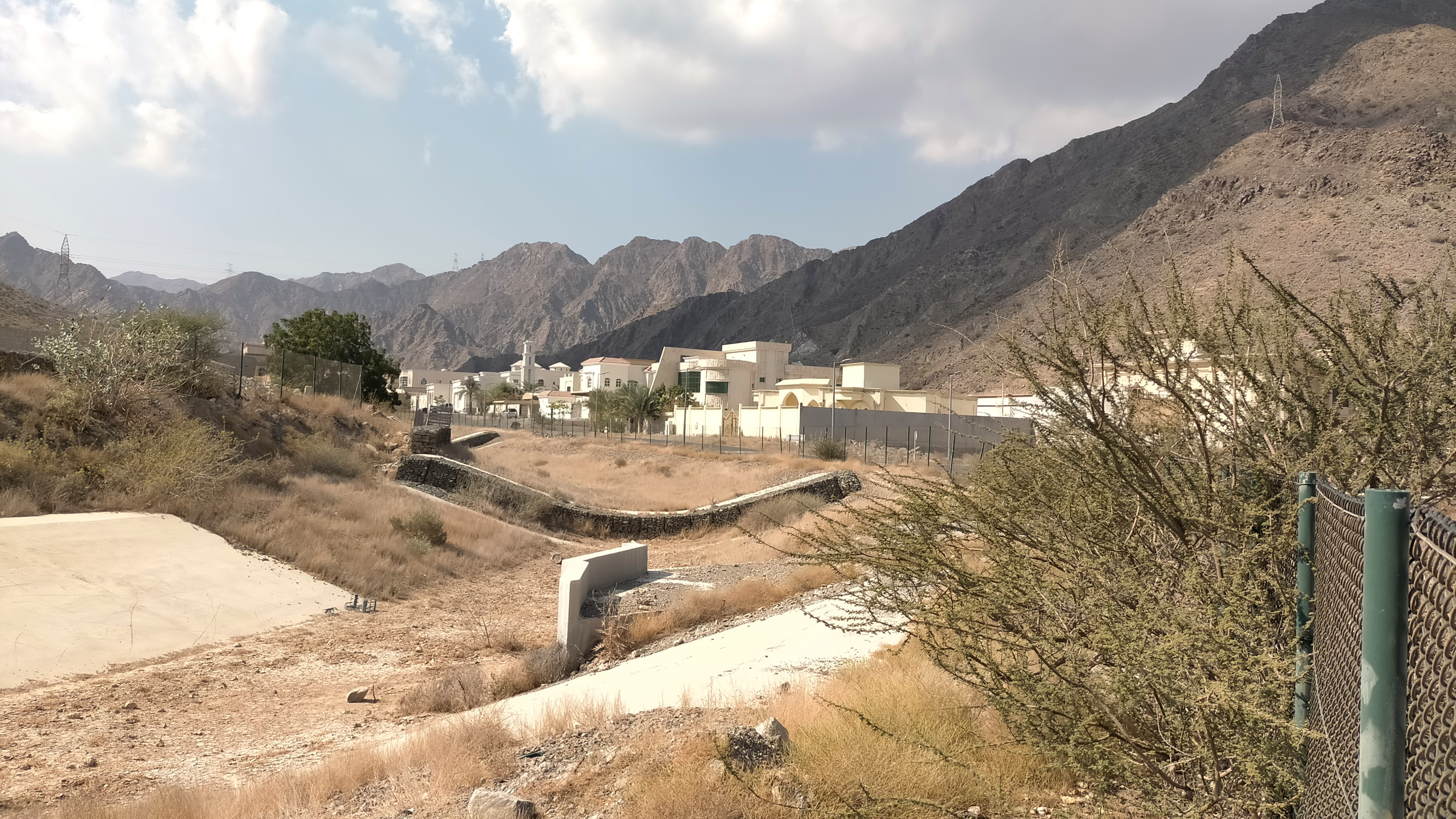
Wadi Sharm, currently channeled through the town of Sharm

When the old dam collapsed, the water contained in the reservoir flooded the city of Sharm, with 2,500 inhabitants, affecting entire neighborhoods, covering farms and roads with debris, disrupting the lives of hundreds of people. As a result, the damage caused by the flood amounted to millions of dollars.

In the wake of this disaster, and to prevent the danger of flash floods and increase the potential for groundwater recharge, A new dam was built on the Wadi Sharm riverbed (coordinates: 25°28′6″N, 56°20′31″E).

== Toponymy ==
Alternative names: Wādī Sharm, Wadi Sharam, Ghalīlat Da'ān

The name and cartographic references of Wadi Sharm (with the spelling Wadi Sharam) were recorded in the documentation and maps produced between 1950 and 1960 by the British Arabist, cartographer, military officer and diplomat Julian F. Walker, during the work carried out to establish borders between the then called Trucial States, later completed by the Ministry of Defence of the United Kingdom, on scale maps 1:100,000 published in 1971.

In the National Atlas of the United Arab Emirates it appears with the spelling Wādī Sharm.

== Population ==
The Wadi Sharm area was mainly populated by the sharquiyín or sharqiyin tribe, corresponding to the tribal section of Hamudiyin / Hamūdiyīn.

In the work of the British diplomat and historian John Gordon Lorimer, published in 1908 Gazetteer of the Persian Gulf, Oman and Central Arabia, reference is made to the village of Sharm/Sharam, describing it as a village of 40 houses of Sharqiyin, situated on the coast, the next village south of Dhadnah, which has 2,000 date palms, 4 camels, 10 donkeys, 50 cattle and 200 sheep and goats.

== See also ==
- List of wadis of the United Arab Emirates
- List of mountains in the United Arab Emirates
- List of wadis of Oman
- List of mountains in Oman
