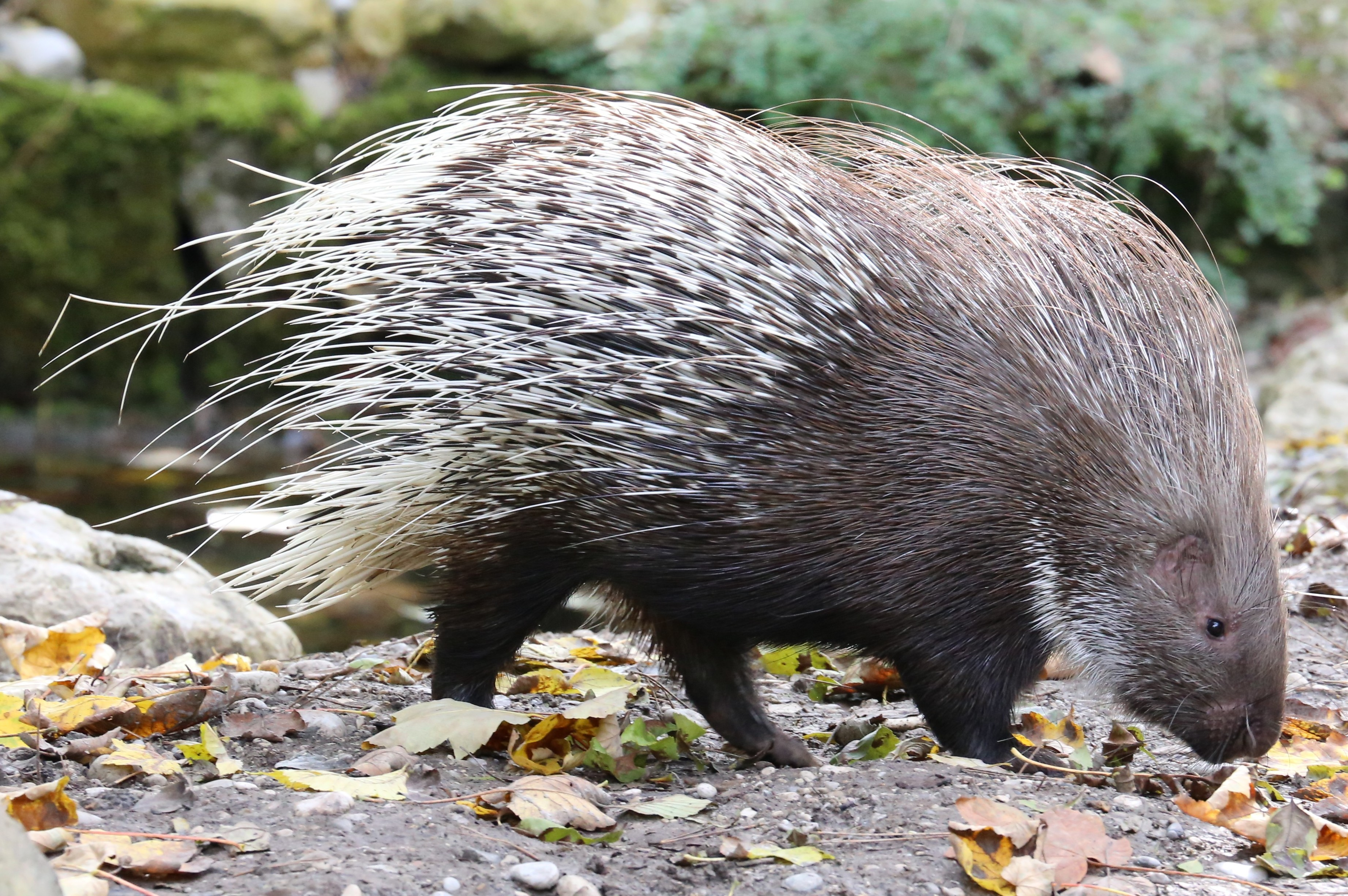

Conservation status
- Least Concern (IUCN 3.1)

Scientific classification
- Kingdom: Animalia
- Phylum: Chordata
- Class: Mammalia
- Order: Rodentia
- Family: Hystricidae
- Genus: Hystrix
- Species: H. indica

Binomial name
- Hystrix indica Kerr, 1792
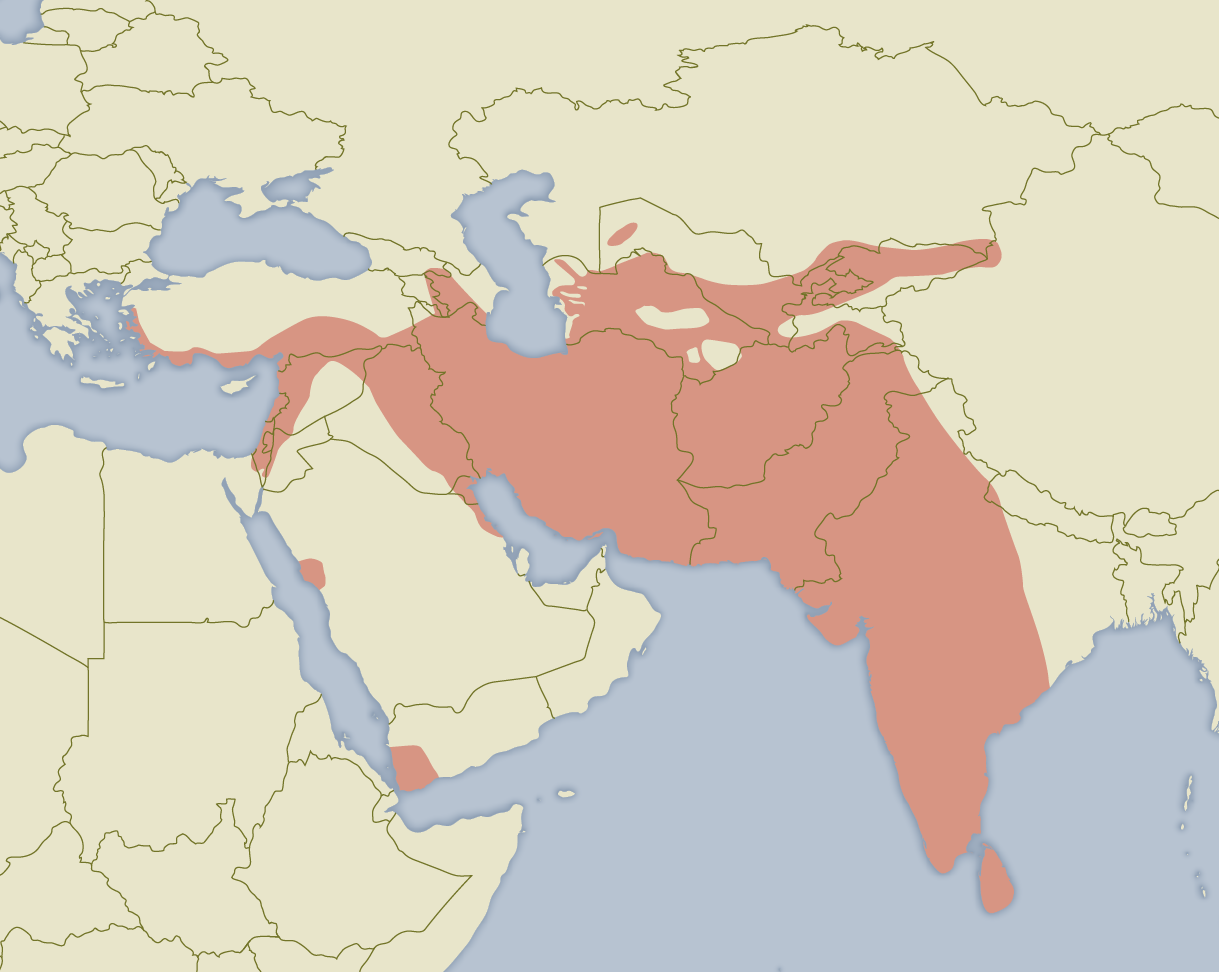

= Indian crested porcupine =

Species of rodent

The Indian crested porcupine (Hystrix indica) is a hystricomorph rodent species in the Old World porcupine family, Hystricidae. It is native to West Asia and South Asia and listed as Least Concern on the IUCN Red List.

== Description ==
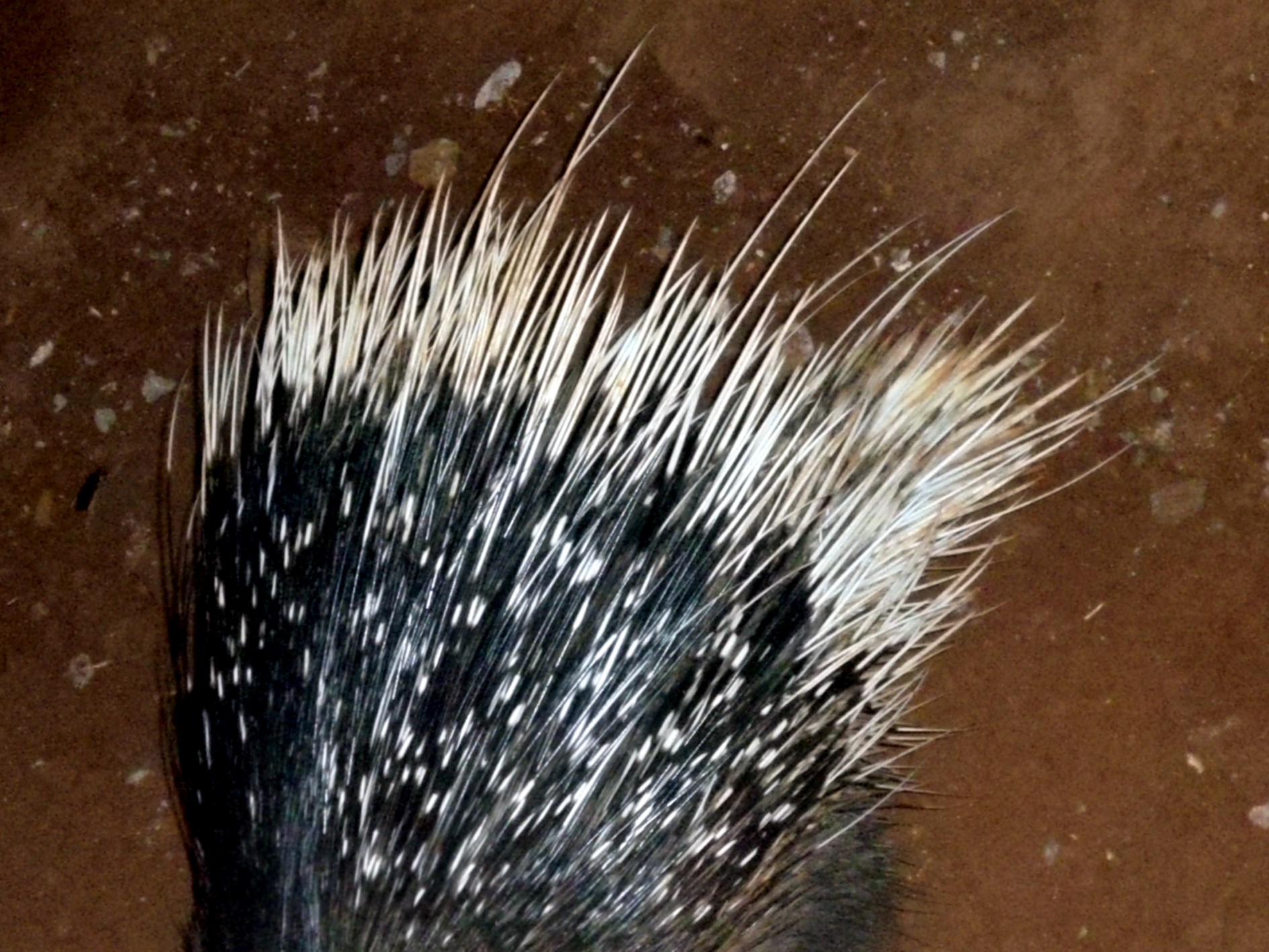
Spines of an indian crested porcupine

The Indian crested porcupine is a large rodent, weighing 11–18 kg (24–40 lb). The body from nose to base of the tail measures between 70 and 90 cm (28 and 35 in), with the tail adding an additional 8–10 cm (3.1–3.9 in). It is covered in multiple layers of modified hair called quills, with longer, thinner quills covering a layer of shorter, thicker ones. The quills are brown or black with alternating white and black bands. They are made of keratin and are relatively flexible. Each quill is connected to a muscle at its base, allowing the porcupine to raise its quills when it feels threatened. The longest quills are located on the neck and shoulder, where the quills form a "skirt" around the animal. These quills can grow up to 51 cm (20 in) long, with most measuring between 15 and 30 cm (5.9 and 11.8 in). Smaller and more rigid quills with a length of about 20 cm (7.9 in) are packed densely on the back and rump, which are used to stab at potential threats. The base of the tail contains shorter quills that appear white in color, with longer, hollow quills that the porcupine can rattle to produce a warning sound when threatened.

The Indian crested porcupine has a stocky build with a low surface area to volume ratio, which aids in heat conservation. It has broad feet with long claws used for burrowing. Like all porcupines, the Indian crested porcupine has a good sense of smell and sharp, chisel-like incisors.

== Distribution and habitat ==
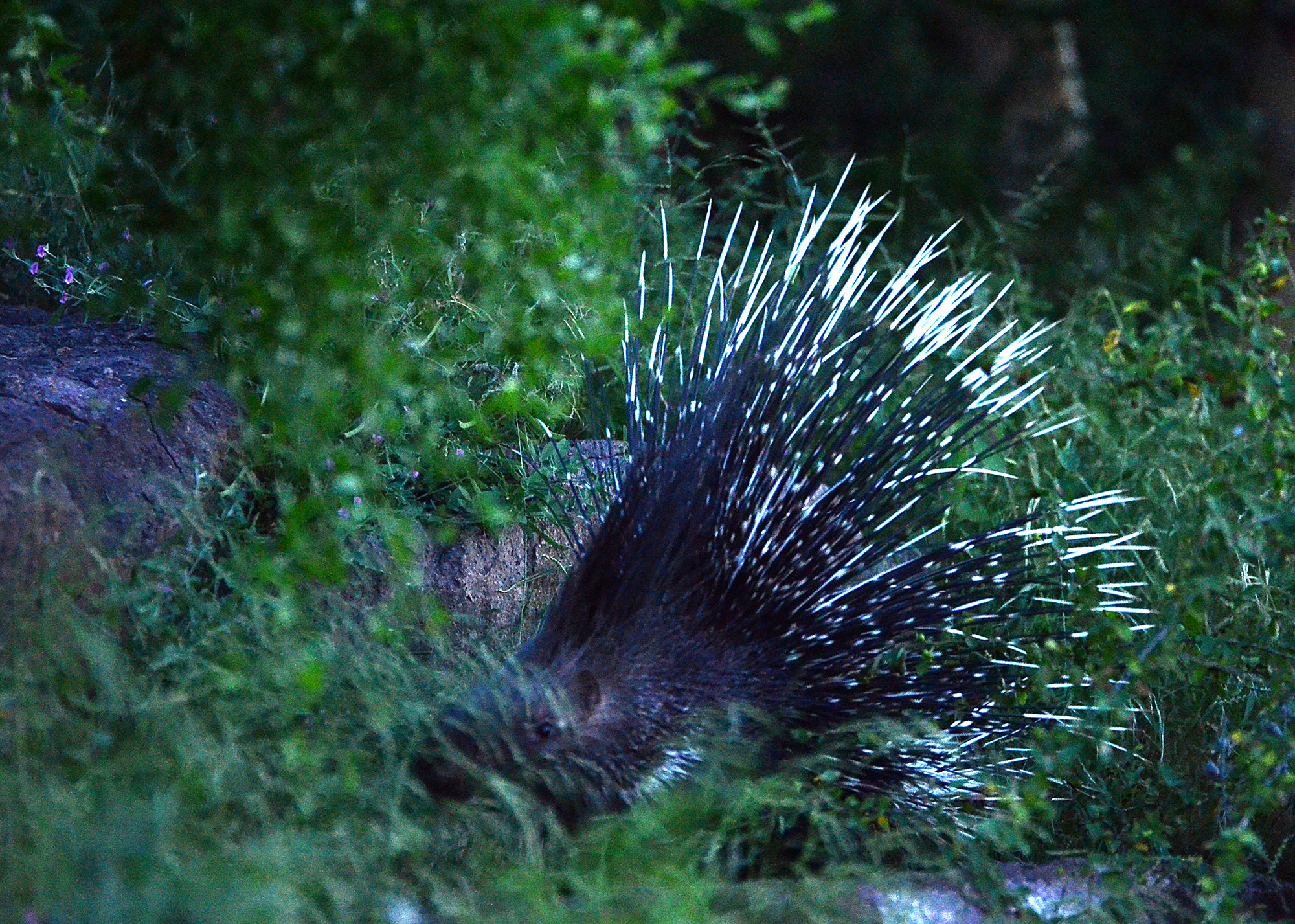
Indian crested porcupine at Jodhpur, Rajasthan

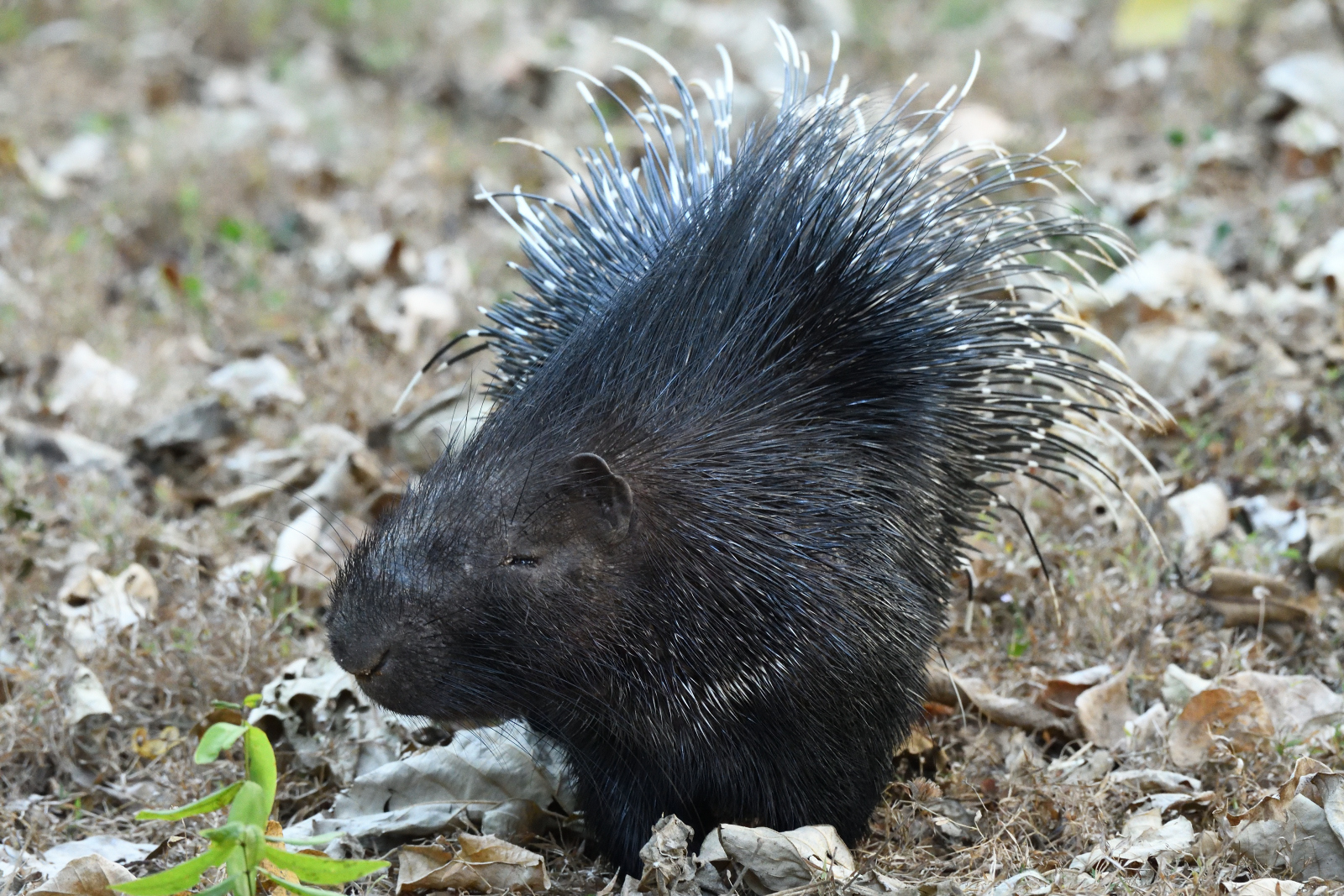
In India

The Indian crested porcupine occurs throughout southwest and central Asia, including Afghanistan, Armenia, Azerbaijan, China, Georgia, Kuwait, India, Iran, Iraq, Israel, Jordan, Kazakhstan, Nepal, Pakistan, Saudi Arabia, Sri Lanka, and Syria. It lives in a broad range of habitats, prefers rocky hillsides, but is also common in tropical and temperate shrublands, grasslands, forests, plantations, and gardens. Its range seems to be limited by seasonal densities of forage and the availability of suitable substrates for digging burrows. More specifically, the northern range of the Indian crested porcupine is limited by minimum summer night duration, and it does not occur above latitudes where minimum night duration is less than 7 hours, presumably because of the amount of foraging time required to meet its dietary needs.

In 2018, the first documented sighting of an Indian crested porcupine took place at Wadi Wurayah in the United Arab Emirates. In 2019, another individual was spotted in the Russian republic of Dagestan.

== Behaviour and ecology ==
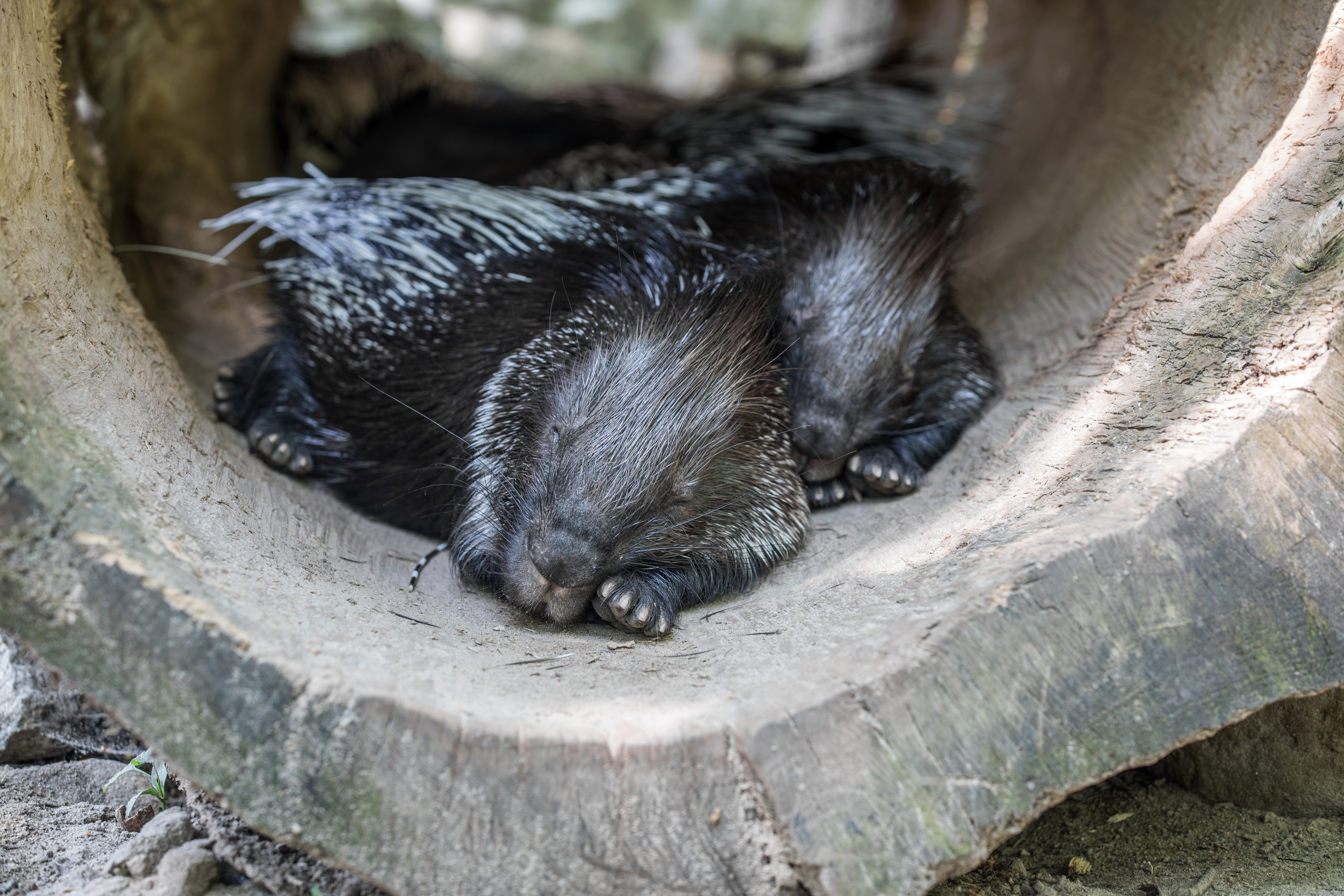
Indian crested porcupines in their den at Zoo Stralsund

The Indian crested porcupine is semifossorial and nocturnal; it is a good swimmer. It lives in natural caves or in excavated burrows and spends most of its life on or under the ground. During the day, it remains in the den, but throughout the winter, it occasionally emerges from its den during daylight hours to bask in the sun.

Both adults and weaned juveniles spend an average of 7 hours foraging every night. It tends to avoid moonlight in the winter months, which could be a strategy to evade predation. However, during summer months it does not avoid moonlight, but tends to stay closer to its den.

Predators of the Indian crested porcupine include large cats, caracals, wolves, striped hyenas, Asian wild dogs, saltwater crocodiles and humans. When excited or scared, a porcupine stands its quills up to appear larger. It can also rattle the hollow quills at the base of its tail, stomp its feet, growl, grunt, or charge backward into the threat.

=== Diet ===
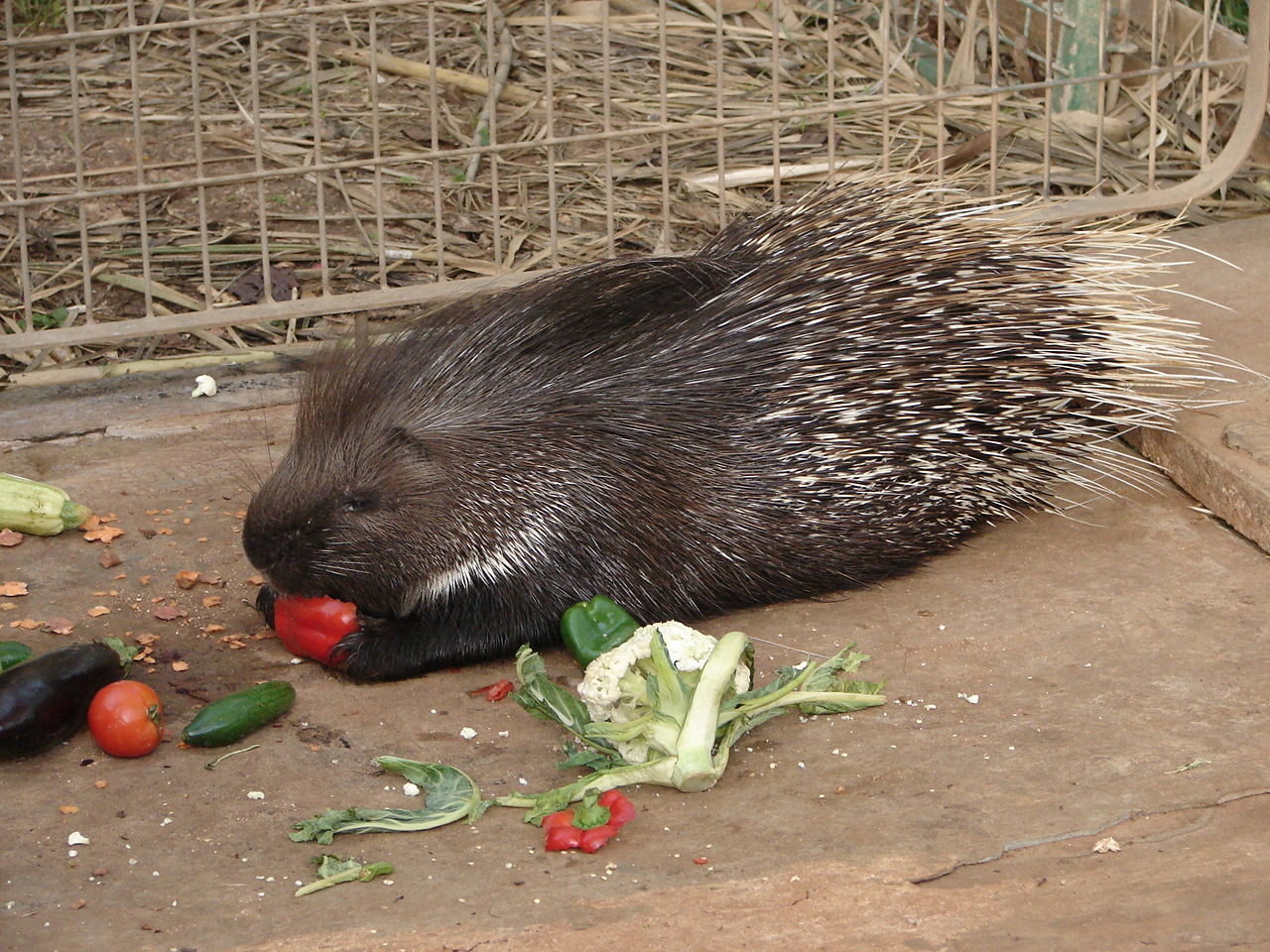
A captive Indian crested porcupine

The Indian crested porcupines has a broad and mostly herbivorous diet. It consumes a variety of natural and agricultural plant material, including roots, bulbs, fruits, grains, drupe and tubers, along with insects and small vertebrates. Because it is a cecal digester, it is able to exploit low quality forage. It also chews on bones to acquire minerals, such as calcium, that aid in quill growth. Its capability to form substantial fat reserves is a useful adaptation for living in seasonally fluctuating habitats.

The Indian crested porcupine can act as substantial habitat modifiers when excavating tubers. It is also considered a serious agricultural pest in many parts of its range as it forages on crops. For these reasons, it is often regarded as a nuisance.

=== Reproduction ===
Indian crested porcupines mate in February and March. Gestation lasts an average of 240 days. A female gives birth to one brood of two to four offspring per year. Young are born with open eyes and are covered in short, soft quills that harden within a few hours after birth. Young are fully weaned 13–19 weeks after birth, but remain in the den with parents and siblings until sexual maturity around 2 years of age. It has been reported that the Indian crested porcupine is usually monogamous and mates every night throughout its life, not only for reproduction, but also to maintain and strengthen the pair bond, the relationship between the male and female partners.

The lifespan of Indian crested porcupines in the wild is unknown, however, the oldest known Indian crested porcupine in captivity was a female that lived up to be 27.1 years old.

== Conservation ==
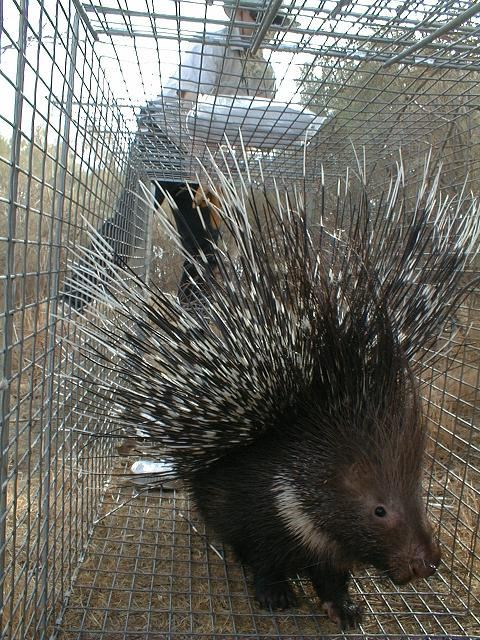
Indian crested porcupine in an animal trap

Due to its adaptability to a wide range of habitats and food types, the Indian crested porcupine is listed as Least Concern on the IUCN Red List as of 2008. Populations are stable and not severely fragmented, and while population status varies across its range, in many places it is common enough to be considered a pest. However, as a result of urbanization, infrastructure development, and pesticide use, suitable porcupine habitat is currently declining.

The Indian crested porcupine is protected under the India Schedule IV of the Indian Wildlife Protection Act of 1972, amended up to 2002. Nonetheless, because it is destructive to gardens and agricultural crops, it is widely hunted. It is traded for consumption and medicinal use.
