= Indian School Fujairah =

Coordinates: 25.14916°N 56.34975°E

Indian School Fujairah.
- Founded: 1980
- Headquarters: Fujairah, UAE

Indian School Fujairah is an educational institute based in Fujairah, UAE. It was established in 1980.

It follows Kerala syllabus.
