= Al Bidya =

Al Bidya ٱلْبَدِيَة Al-Bidyah ٱلْبِدْيَة
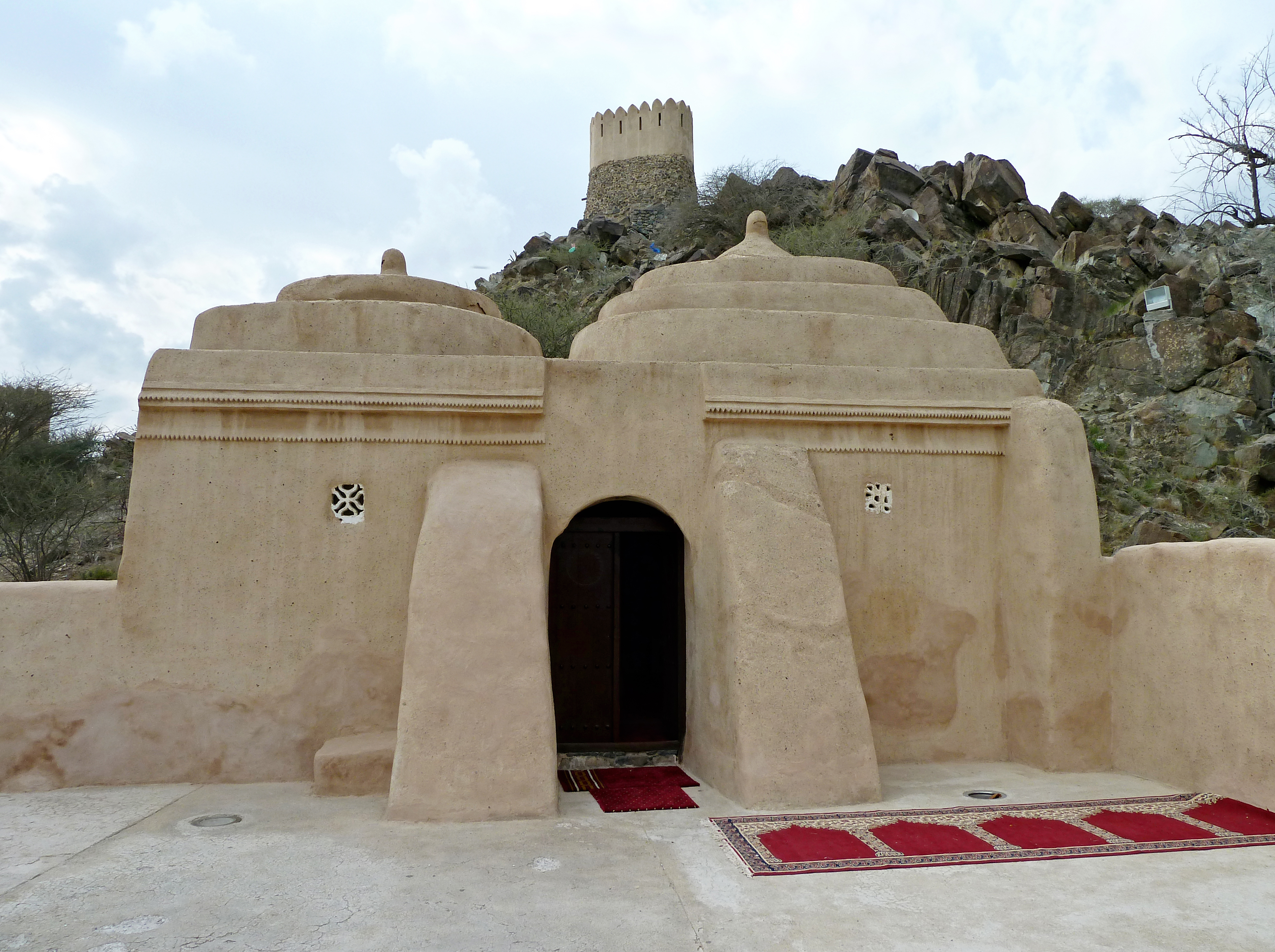
- Al-Bidya mosque

- Location within United Arab Emirates
- Coordinates: 25°25′53″N 56°20′54″E
- Country: United Arab Emirates
- Emirate: Fujairah

Government
  - Type: Monarchy
  - Emir: Sheikh Hamad bin Mohammed Al Sharqi (Al Sharqi)
  - Crown Prince: Mohammad bin Hamad Al Sharqi
- Elevation: 33 m (108 ft)

Population (2015)
  - Total: 7,153
- Time zone: UTC+4

Al Bidya (Arabic: ٱلْبَدِيَة) also Al-Badiyah or Al-Bidyah (ٱلْبِدْيَة) is a settlement in the Emirate of Fujairah, the United Arab Emirates. It is the site of a historical mosque of the same name, which is the oldest functional mosque in the country, dating back to the 15th century.

== Portuguese fort ==
Remains of a Portuguese era fort have been discovered in the village by a team of Australian archaeologists. The fort, originally called 'Libidia', was identified from a 16th-century map. Its walls were constructed using rock recovered from a nearby tower dated back to the third millennium BCE. These walls, some 60 metres (200 feet) in length, are joined in a square with towers on each corner and stand today at a height of up to a meter. Finds at the site of the fort include locally made pottery dating back to the 17th and 18th centuries, and charcoal samples unearthed were carbon dated to 1450–1600, within the context of the Portuguese presence in the Gulf.

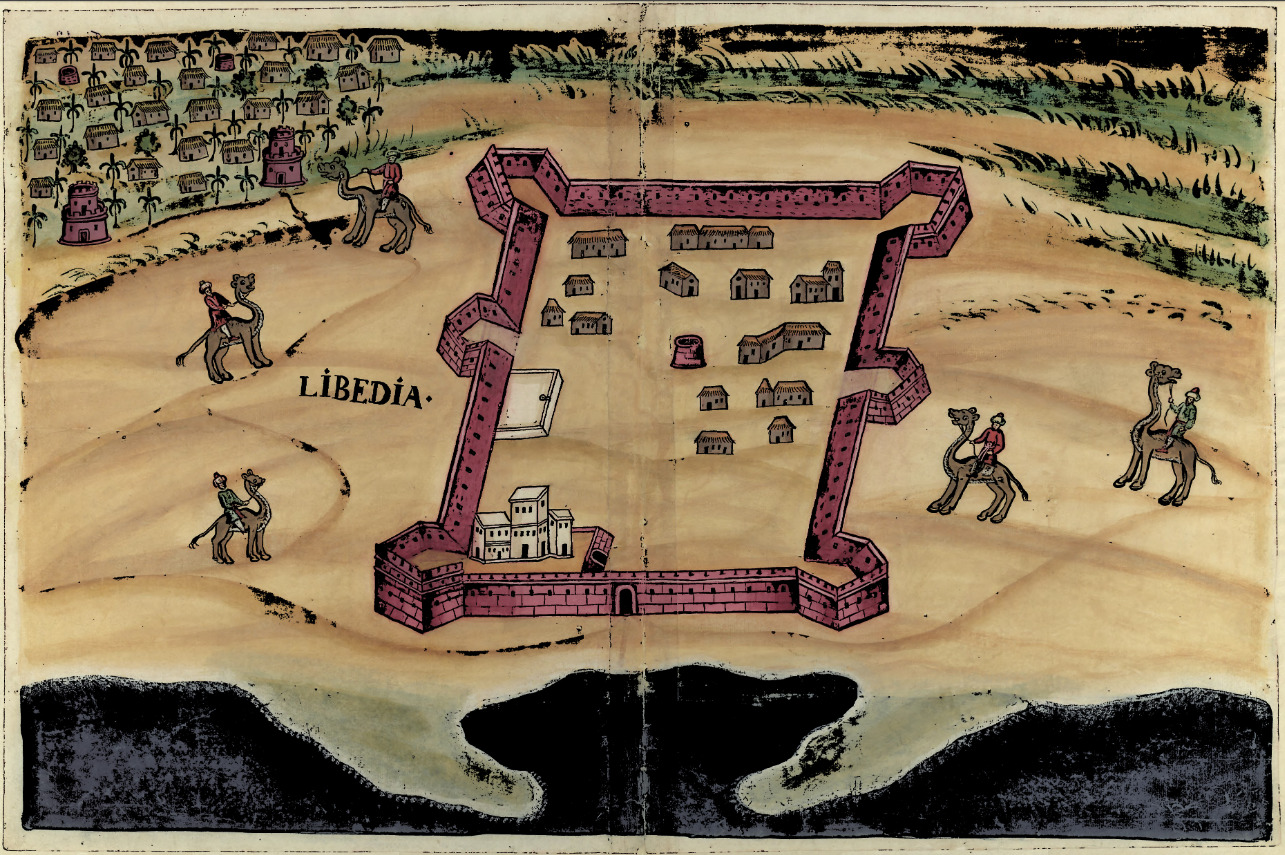
Portuguese Fortress Al Bidya (Libedia). Livro das plantas de todas as fortalezas, cidades e povoaçoens do Estado da India Oriental / António Bocarro [1635].
