= Wadi Wurayah =

Nature preserve in the UAE

Wadi Wurayah National Park وَادِي ٱلْوُرَيْعَة
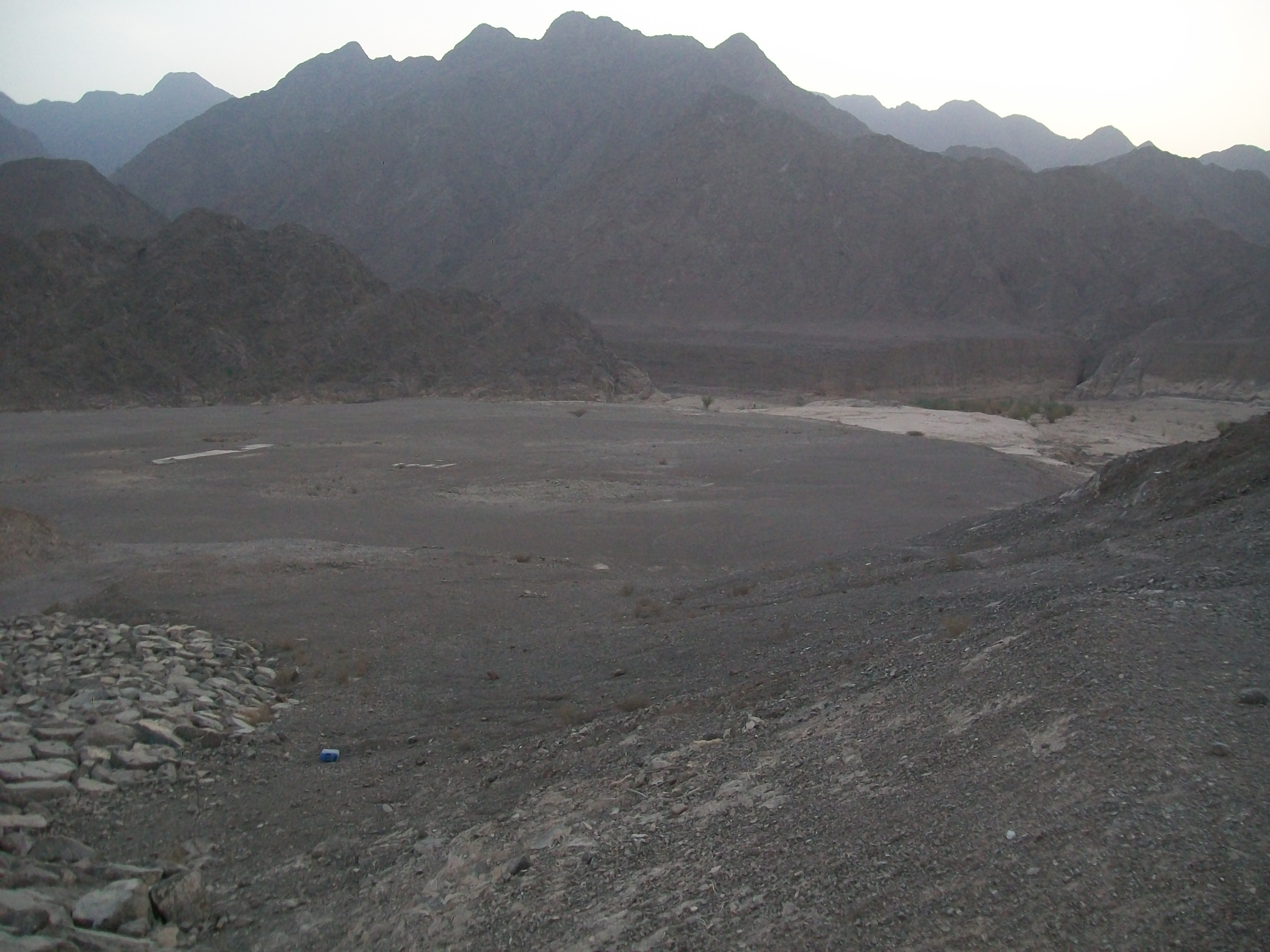
- Overview of Wadi Wuray'ah

- Location within United Arab Emirates Location within Persian Gulf Location within Middle East Location within Asia
- Location: Fujairah, United Arab Emirates
- Nearest city: Masafi
- Coordinates: 25°24′N 56°15′E
- Area: 12,700 hectares (31,000 acres)
- Established: 2009

Ramsar Wetland
- Official name: Wadi Wurayah National Park
- Designated: 10 July 2010
- Reference no.: 1932

UNESCO World Heritage Site
- Criteria: Natural: ix
- Reference: 1724
- Inscription: 2026 (48th Session)
- Area: 22,000 ha
- Buffer zone: 4,500 ha

Wadi Wurayah (Arabic: وَادِي ٱلْوُرَيْعَة, romanized: Wādī Al-Wurayʿah) is a 12,700-hectare (31,000-acre) wadi between the towns of Masafi, Khor Fakkan, and Bidiyah in the United Arab Emirates. It has been designated as Ramsar Wetland of International Importance. The lush canyon in the area was named after the tall marsh plant known as ‘warrah’, that flourishes in its wetlands, while the word ‘wadi’ is the Arabic term for valley.

== Protected area ==
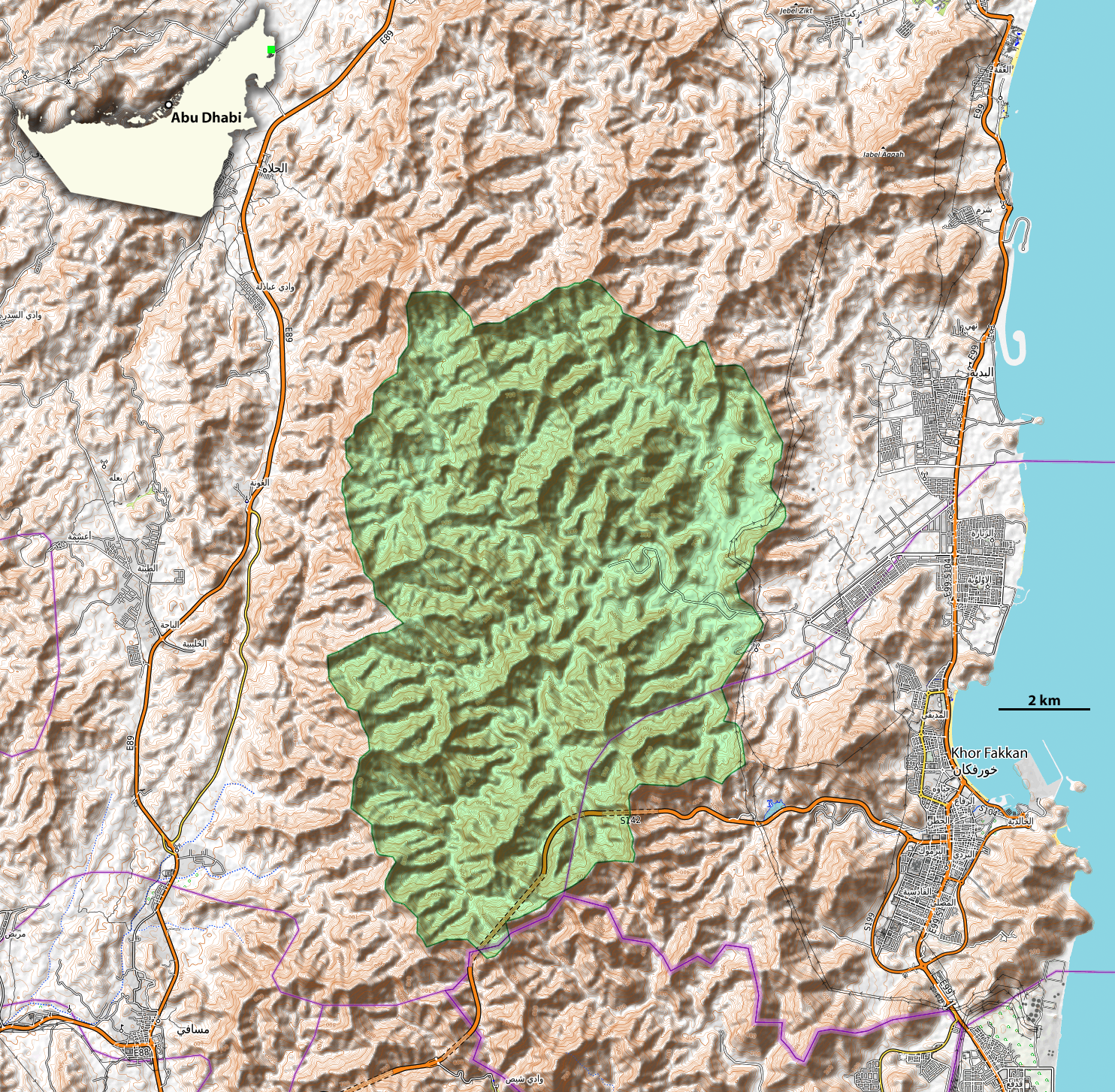
Map of the protected area

On 16 March 2009, the Wadi Wurayah became the first protected mountain area in the United Arab Emirates, after a three-year campaign by the Emirates Wildlife Society in Association with World Wide Fund for Nature, with the support of HSBC Bank Middle East Limited. In addition to the conservation of the area's delicate ecosystem, EWS-WWF have also set up camera traps to photograph the more elusive wildlife, and arranged field trips for students to help raise awareness of the area.

In 2026, UNESCO designated Wadi Wurayah as a World Heritage Site.

=== Flora and fauna ===
Wadi Wurayah is home to more than 100 species of mammals, birds, reptiles and amphibians, as well as more than 300 species of plants. It is famous for its scenic waterfall set amid the Hajar Mountains. It has streams and pools dotted around the rocky outcrops. It is one of few remaining places in the world where the endangered Arabian tahr still roams free. Conservationists believe it to be among the last places in the UAE where the Arabian leopard, which has not been seen in the UAE since 1995, still survives. A footprint of a leopard was found here. The wadi is also home to the Garra barreimiae, a type of freshwater fish that lives only in the Hajar Mountains. Among the 208 species of plants is a species of wild orchid unique to the area, the Epipactis veratrifolia. In 2018, an Indian crested porcupine was spotted here.

In January 2020, a few Indian fritillaries (Argynnis hyperbius) were found in the park by Binish Roobas, an Indian naturalist based in the UAE, who photographed a male and female. He was visiting the area to survey the diversity of flora and insects, after heavy rainfall in the country from October 2019 to January 2020, along with park ranger Sami Ullah Majeed, biologist Nuri Asmita, and the Chairman of the Dubai Natural History Group, Gary Feulner. It was thought that the fritillaries, which were found flying with members of a physically similar species, the plain tiger (Danaus chrysippus), came here as opportunistic migrants because of the rainfall and would not stay during the summer.

In October 2025, an Arabian caracal (Caracal caracal schmitzi) was spotted here.

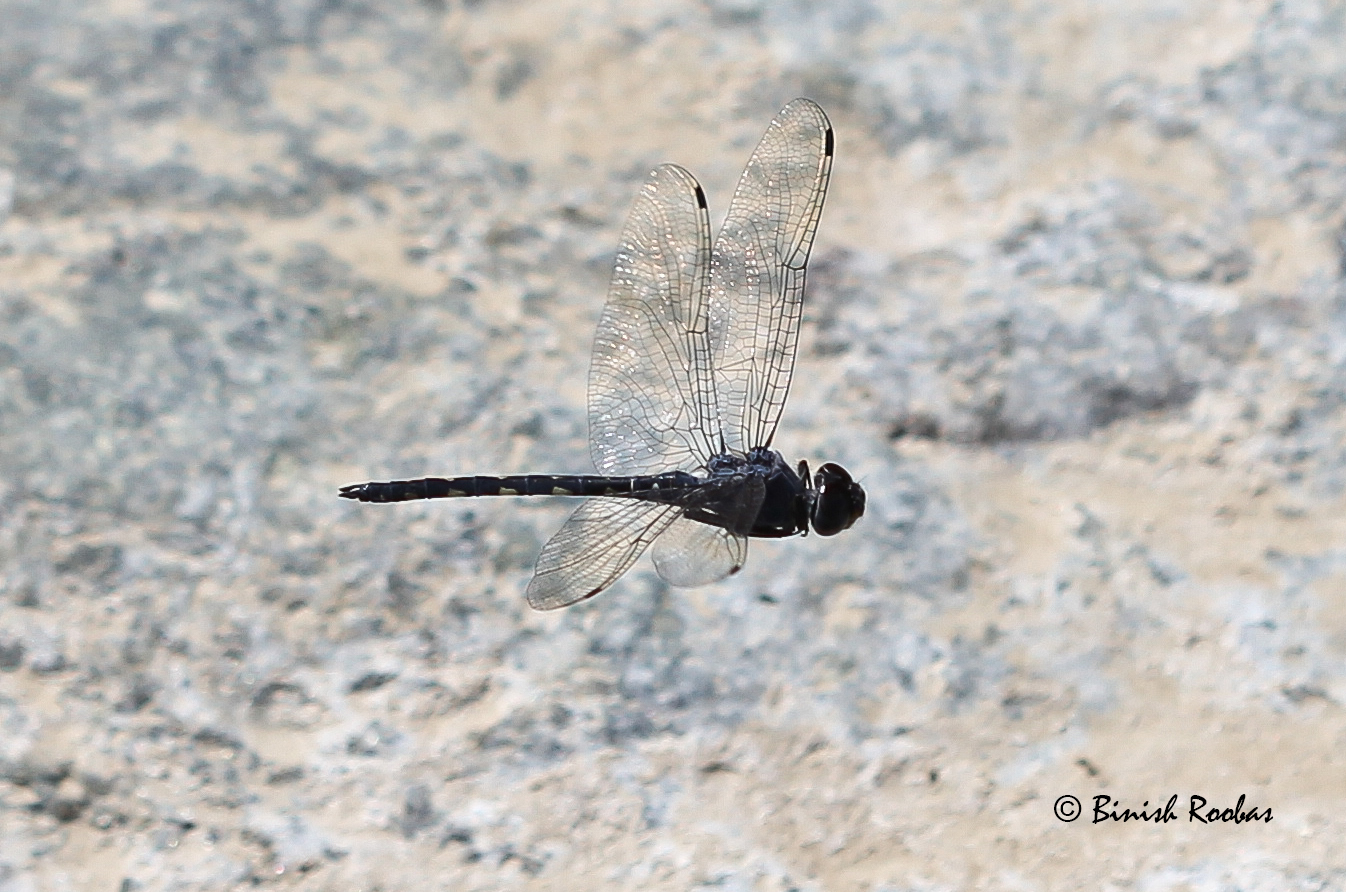
Zygonyx torridus photographed in the wadi

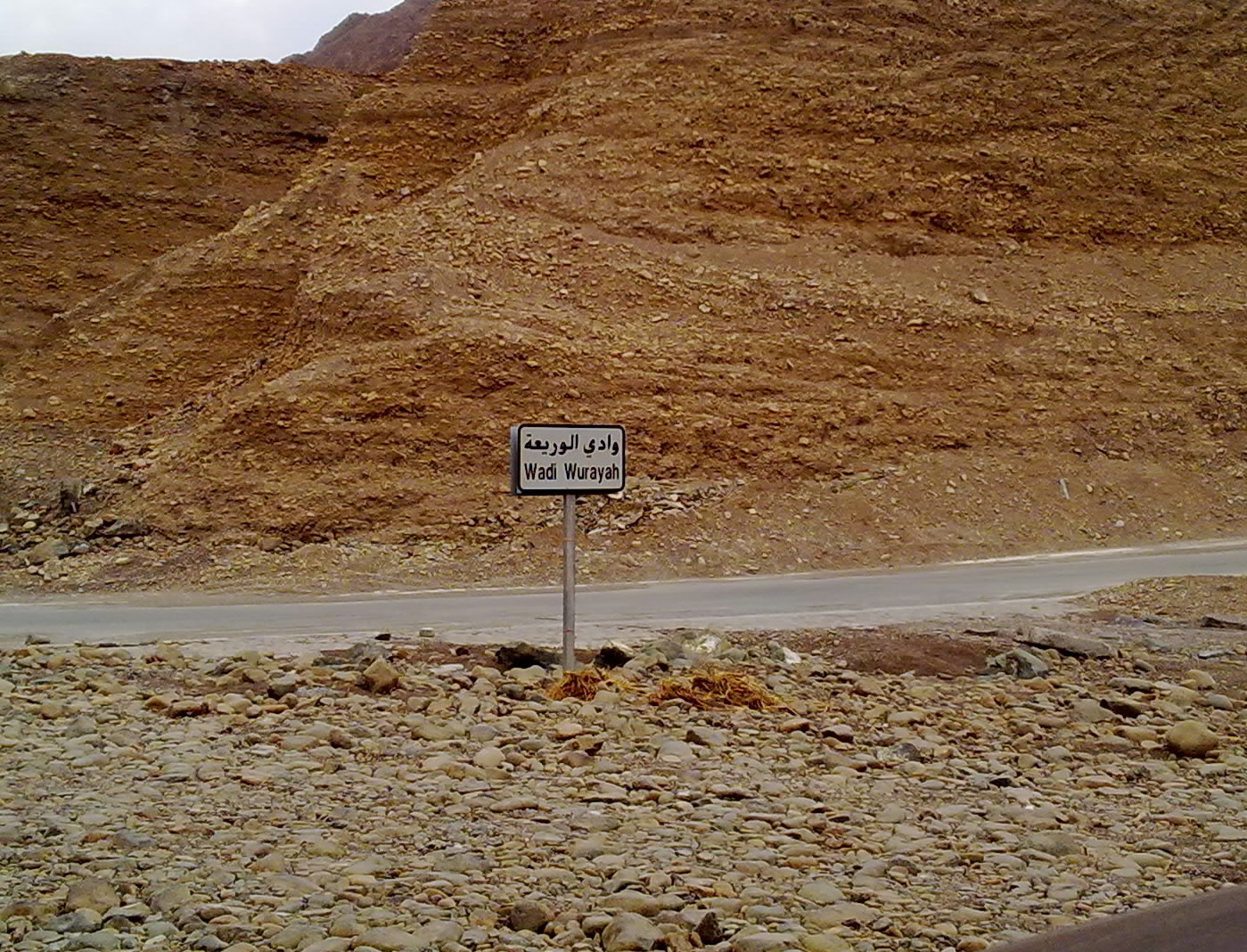
Sign of Wadi Wuray'ah

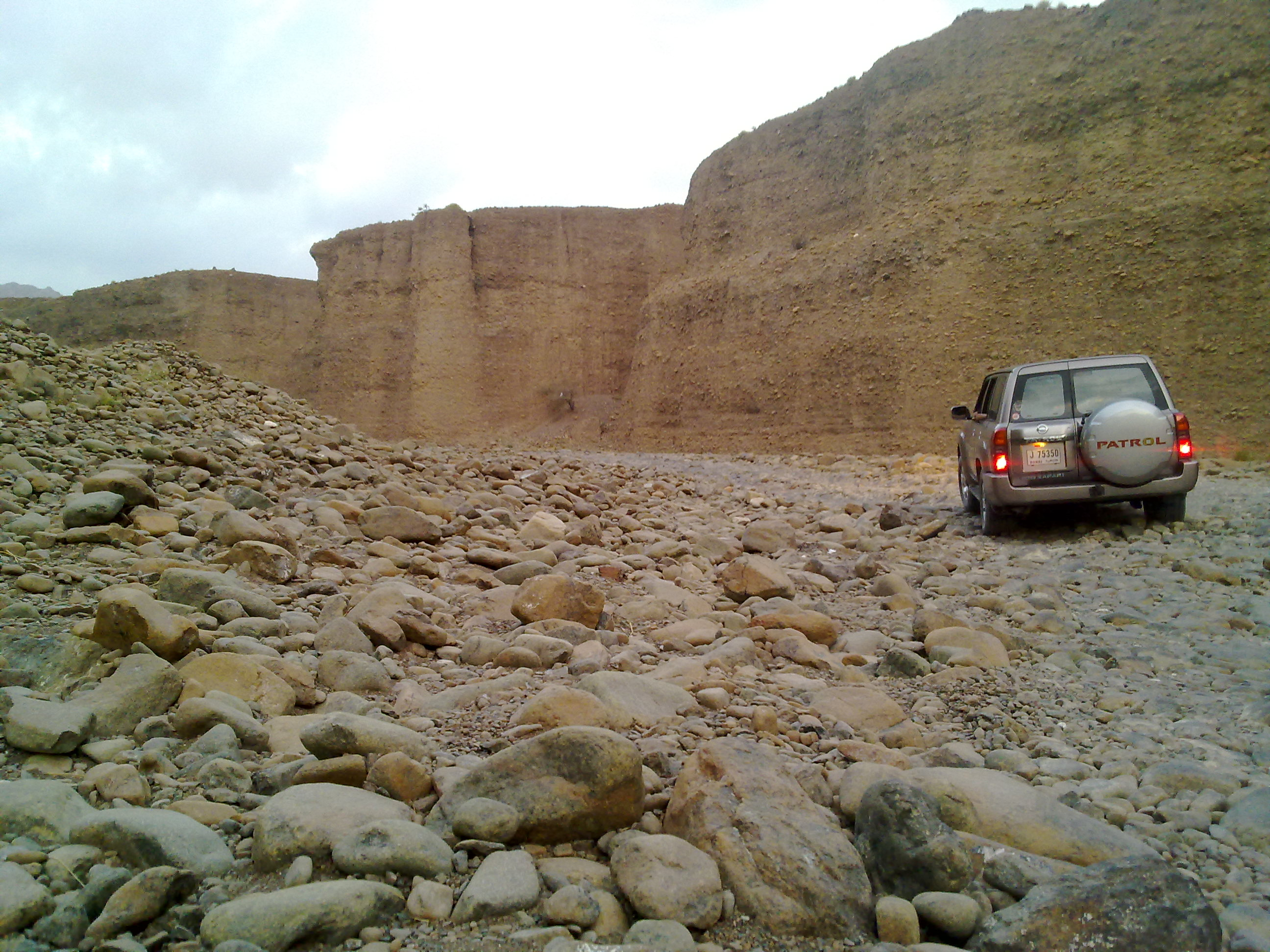
Crossing the wadi

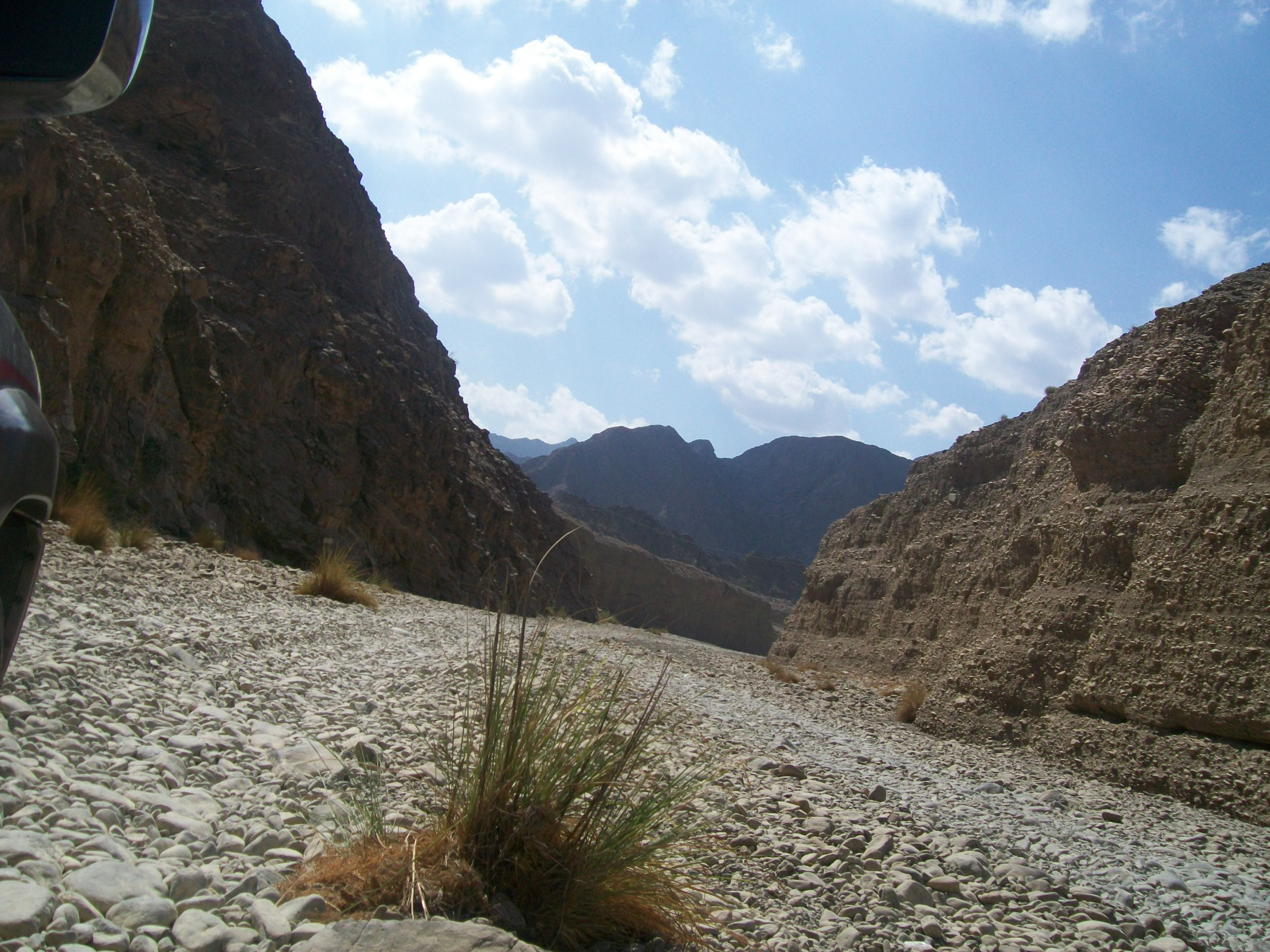
Close up of the wadi's terrain

== See also ==
- Eastern Arabia
  - List of wadis of the United Arab Emirates
- List of Ramsar wetlands of international importance
