= Al Bidya Mosque =

Mosque in Fujairah, United Arab Emirates

Al-Bidya Mosque The Ottoman Mosque
- Masjid Al-Bidyah (مَسْجِد ٱلْبِدْيَة)
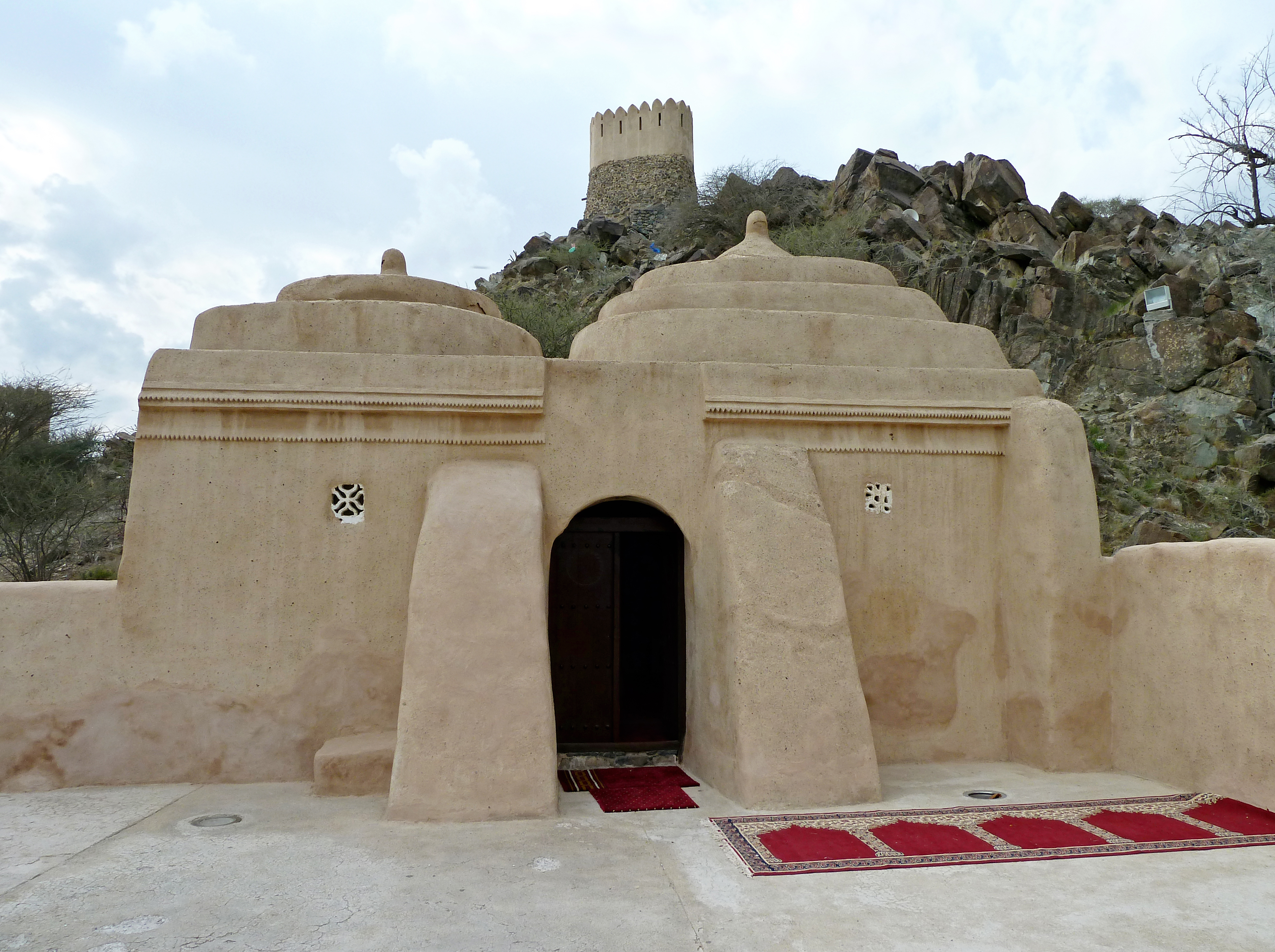

- Location in the U.A.E. Al Bidya Mosque (Persian Gulf) Al Bidya Mosque (Middle East) Al Bidya Mosque (West and Central Asia)

Religion
- Affiliation: Islam
- Branch/tradition: Sunni

Location
- Location: Al-Bidiyah, Fujairah, United Arab Emirates
- Coordinates: 25°26′20.65″N 56°21′14.08″E

Architecture
- Type: Mosque
- Established: 15th century C.E.

Specifications
- Dome: 4
- Minaret: 0

Al Bidya Mosque (Gulf Arabic: مَسْجِد ٱلْبِدْيَة, romanized: Masjid Al-Bidyah, sometimes transliterated as Al-Bidiyah (ٱلْبِدِيَة) or Al-Badiyah (ٱلْبَدِيَة)) is a historical mosque in the village of Al Bidya Emirate of Fujairah, the U.A.E. At some 500 years old, it is the oldest mosque in the country, although ruins of a 1,000 year-old mosque have been found in Al Ain, in Abu Dhabi. It is located in the small village of Al-Badiyah or Al-Bidiyah, about 40 km (25 miles) north of the Emirate's capital city, and is also known as the "Ottoman Mosque".

== History ==
The mosque's date of construction is uncertain and because the mud and stone built structure uses no wood, radiocarbon dating is not possible. It is estimated to date to the 15th century C.E., however some much earlier estimates have been proposed. The site was investigated by the archaeological center of Fujairah in co-operation with the University of Sydney from 1997 to 1998. and Fujairah Archaeology and Heritage Department concluded that the mosque was believed to be built in 1446 AD, along with the two watch towers overlooking the mosque and the village.

== Structure ==
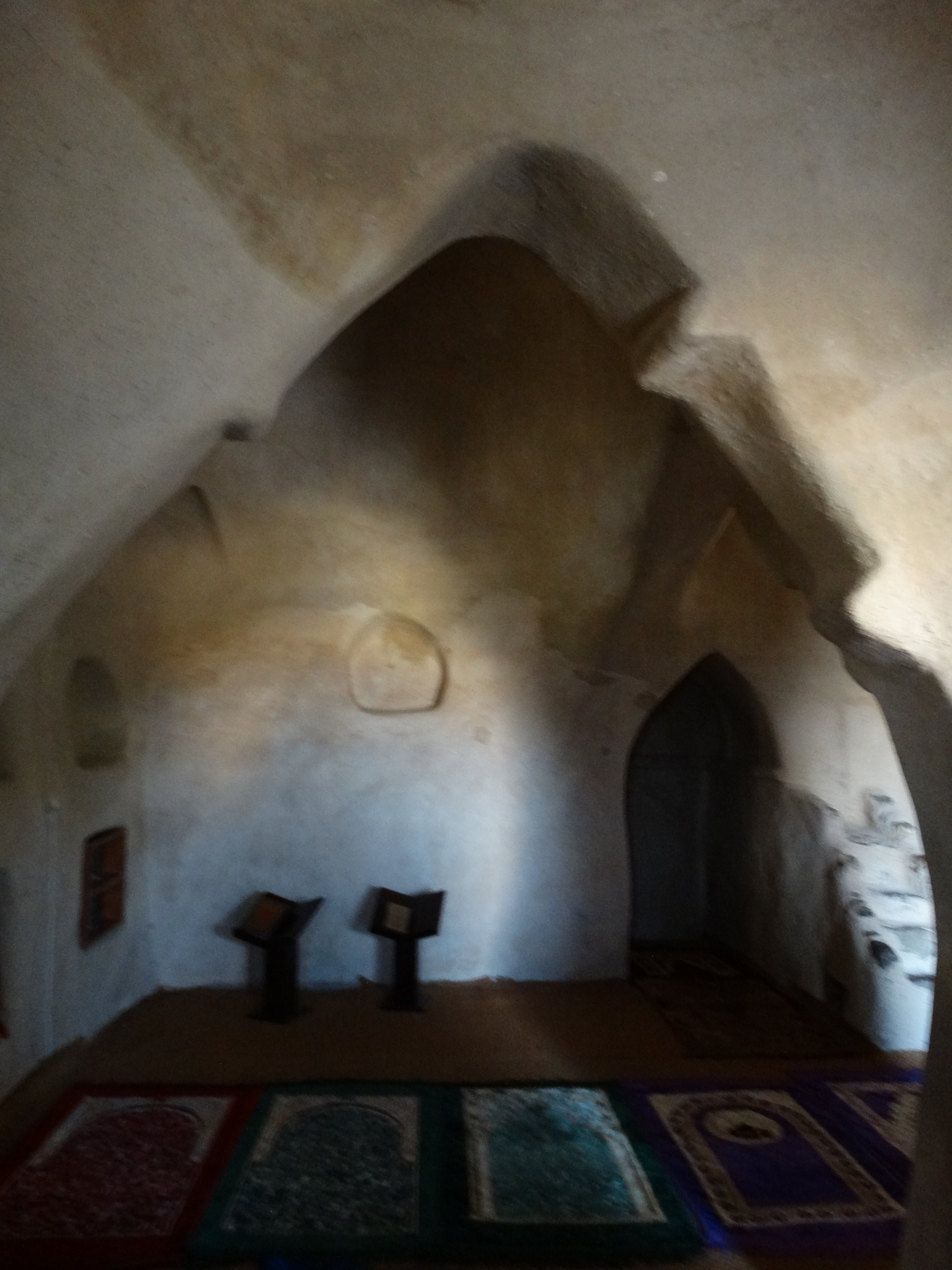
Inner view

The small, square structure has an area of 53 square metres (570 sq ft) and was built from materials available in the area, primarily stones of various sizes and mud bricks coated in many layers of whitewashed plaster. The roof has four squats, helical domes that are supported by only one centrally placed pillar that also forms the ceiling. Entrance to the mosque is through double-winged wooden doors.

The prayer hall has a small mihrab (the niche in the wall that indicates the direction of Mecca), a simple pulpit, arches, and openings. A central pillar divides the internal space into four squares of similar dimensions. The pillar supports all four domes that can be seen from the exterior.

Inside the prayer hall, a number of small decorative windows allow light and air to enter the mosque. There are also cube-shaped spaces carved into the thick walls where copies of the Quran and other books are stored.

The mosque continues to host daily prayers, and is a tourist attraction.

== See also ==
- Islam in the United Arab Emirates
