= St. Mary's Catholic High School, Fujairah =

Coordinates: 25°9′18.3″N 56°20′26.7″E

St. Mary's Catholic High School Fujairah
- Fujairah City; United Arab Emirates

Information
- Motto: "Finis Coronat Opus" (The End Crowns the Work)
- Religious affiliation: Roman Catholic
- Established: 2003
- School board: CBSE (Central Board of Secondary Education); GCSE Edexcel Board and GCE A-Levels
- Grades: Kindergarten to Grade 12 'GCSE', Kindergarten to Grade 12 'CBSE'
- Website: www.smchfujuae.com

St. Mary's Catholic High School, Fujairah is a Catholic school located in the Sakamkam area in Fujairah, United Arab Emirates.

== History ==
The school was founded in 2002. The school was initially managed by Italian Nuns, which was then handed over to Salesians of Don Bosco priests from the Chennai Province of India.

== Curriculum ==
The school follows and is affiliated to the CBSE curriculum, iGCSE Edexcel Board and GCE A'Levels.
