= Emirate of Fujairah =

Emirate and one of the constituents of the United Arab Emirates

Emirate of Fujairah إِمَـارَة ٱلْفُجَيْرَة
- Emirate
- Flag Coat of arms

- Location of Fujairah in the UAE
- Interactive map of Emirate of Fujairah
- Coordinates: 25°16′N 56°20′E
- Country: United Arab Emirates
- Seat: Fujairah
- Boroughs: 2 municipalities: Fujairah Municipality; Dibba Al-Fujairah Municipality

Government
  - Type: Islamic absolute monarchy within a federation
  - Ruler: Sheikh Hamad bin Mohammed Al Sharqi
  - Crown Prince: Sheikh Mohammed bin Hamad bin Mohammed Al Sharqi

Area
  - Emirate: 1,166 km^{2} (450 sq mi)
  - Rank: 5th

Population (2009 estimate)
  - Rank: 6th
  - Metro: 317,000

GDP
  - Total: US$ 6.8 billion (2023)
  - Per capita: US$ 23,500 (2023)
- Time zone: UTC+4 (UAE standard time)
- Website: www.fujairah.ae/en/pages/default.aspx

The Emirate of Fujairah (Arabic: إِمَـارَة ٱلْفُجَيْرَة, romanized: Al-Fuǧaira; MSA: /al fud͡ʒajra/ Emirati Arabic : [ɪl fʊd͡ʒe̞ːrä]) is one of the seven emirates that make up the United Arab Emirates, the only one of the seven with a coastline solely on the Gulf of Oman and none on the Persian Gulf. Its capital is Fujairah.

== History ==
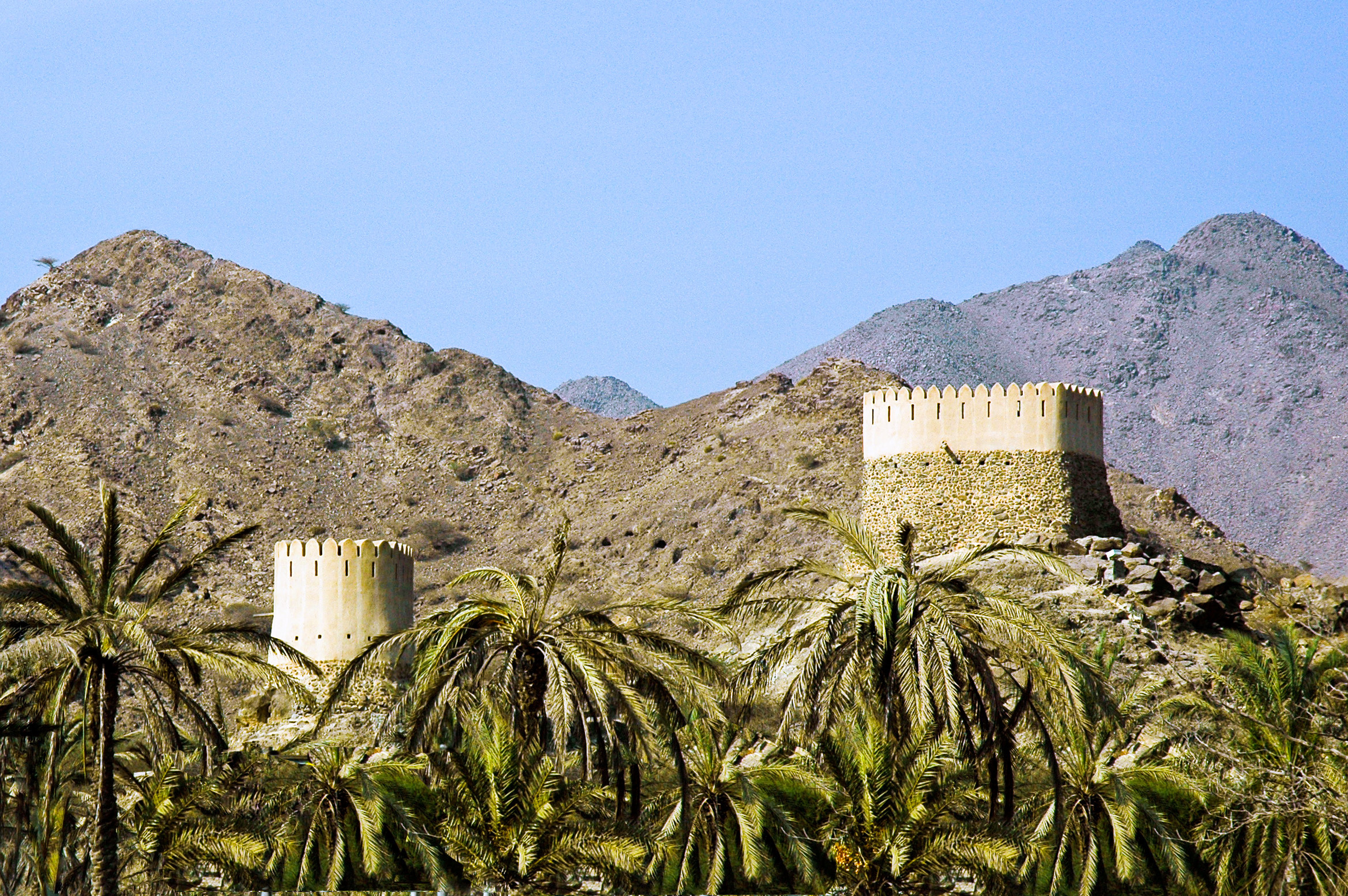
Lookout towers of Al Badiyah Mosque, the oldest surviving mosque in the United Arab Emirates

The Emirate of Fujairah, dominated by the Sharqiyin tribe, sits at the mouth of the important trade route, the Wadi Ham (which is guarded by the Sharqiyin Al Bithnah Fort), through the mountains to the interior and the Persian Gulf Coast. Known as the Shamaliyah, the east coast of what is now the UAE was subject to Muscat until 1850, when it was annexed by Al Qasimi of Sharjah, in an agreement made between Sheikh Sultan bin Saqr Al Qasimi and the Sultan of Muscat. The Shamaliyah was governed by Al-Qasimi Wali at Kalba although frequently seceded and in 1901 Sheikh Hamad bin Abdullah Al Sharqi, chief of the Sharqiyin, declared independence from Sharjah. This was recognized by a number of the Trucial Sheikhs and also by Muscat, but not the British, who were frequently provoked by the independently minded Ruler. At this time, The Emirate of Fujairah consisted of some 150 houses and 3,000 date palms and its people lived mainly through pearling and date cultivation. Since the absorption of Kalba by Sharjah in 1952, the Shamaliyah is shared by the emirates of Fujairah and Sharjah.

In 1952, the Emirate of Fujairah entered into treaty relations with Britain, becoming the last of the emirates to join the Trucial States. Having withheld this recognition for over fifty years, the British government only granted it because the oil exploration company Petroleum Concessions Limited (PCL) needed to sign a concession with a recognized ruler. On 2 December 1971, The Emirate of Fujairah joined the United Arab Emirates.

Archaeological finds in the Emirate of Fujairah point to a history of human occupation and trading links stretching back at least 4,000 years, with Wadi Suq (2,000 to 1,300 BC) burials located at Bithnah and the Qidfa' Oasis. A third millennium BCE tower was used to construct the Portuguese fort at Bidiyah, identified with the Portuguese 'Libedia', a fortress recorded in de Resende's 1646 map - the fortress itself has been carbon dated to 1450–1670.

The Emirate of Fujairah is also rich in late Islamic fortresses, as well as being home to the oldest mosque in use in the United Arab Emirates, Al Badiyah Mosque, which was built in 1446 of mud and bricks. (Note: The remains of a mosque, excavated in 2018 in Al Ain in the Emirate of Abu Dhabi, near the Sheikh Khalifa Mosque are the oldest known in the country, dating back to the Islamic Golden Age.) It is similar to other mosques found in Yemen, eastern Oman, and Qatar. Al Badiyah Mosque has four domes (unlike the other similar mosques which have between seven and twelve) and lacks a minaret.

== Geography ==
The Emirate of Fujairah covers approximately 1,166 km^{2} (450 sq mi), or about 1.5% of the area of the UAE, and is the fifth-largest emirate in the UAE.

The weather is seasonal, although it is warm most of the year. The months of December to March are generally the coolest, with daytime temperatures averaging around 25 °C (77 °F) and rarely venturing above 30 °C (86 °F)—with temperatures climbing to over 40 °C (104 °F) degrees in the summer. The winter period also coincides with the rainy season and although by no means guaranteed, this is when the Emirate of Fujairah experiences the bulk of its precipitation. Rainfall is higher than the rest of the UAE, partly because of the effect of the mountains that encircle the Emirate, and partly because the prevailing winds are easterly bringing with them water-laden clouds off the warm Indian Ocean. The variability of the east coast climate is partly due to the presence of the Hajar mountain range. As with other mountainous areas, precipitation is higher, and this allows for a more varied micro-environment in the area. Tourist visitor numbers peak just before the school summer months.

Climate data for Fujairah International Airport (1990-2016)
Month	Jan	Feb	Mar	Apr	May	Jun	Jul	Aug	Sep	Oct	Nov	Dec	Year
Record high °C (°F)	31.0 (87.8)	35.6 (96.1)	38.6 (101.5)	44.1 (111.4)	50.2 (122.4)	49.5 (121.1)	49.0 (120.2)	48.3 (118.9)	45.2 (113.4)	41.5 (106.7)	38.7 (101.7)	32.8 (91.0)	50.2 (122.4)
Mean daily maximum °C (°F)	24.6 (76.3)	25.8 (78.4)	28.6 (83.5)	33.7 (92.7)	38.4 (101.1)	39.2 (102.6)	37.5 (99.5)	36.2 (97.2)	35.7 (96.3)	34.2 (93.6)	30.3 (86.5)	26.7 (80.1)	32.6 (90.6)
Daily mean °C (°F)	20.7 (69.3)	21.7 (71.1)	24.2 (75.6)	28.9 (84.0)	33.5 (92.3)	34.8 (94.6)	34.0 (93.2)	32.9 (91.2)	32.0 (89.6)	30.2 (86.4)	26.2 (79.2)	22.6 (72.7)	28.5 (83.3)
Mean daily minimum °C (°F)	17.0 (62.6)	18.0 (64.4)	20.3 (68.5)	24.7 (76.5)	29.2 (84.6)	31.2 (88.2)	31.5 (88.7)	30.5 (86.9)	29.1 (84.4)	26.4 (79.5)	22.5 (72.5)	18.9 (66.0)	24.9 (76.9)
Record low °C (°F)	10.8 (51.4)	11.0 (51.8)	14.8 (58.6)	17.0 (62.6)	20.5 (68.9)	24.6 (76.3)	26.7 (80.1)	26.0 (78.8)	24.4 (75.9)	18.5 (65.3)	16.8 (62.2)	12.1 (53.8)	10.8 (51.4)
Average precipitation mm (inches)	20.4 (0.80)	10.2 (0.40)	23.9 (0.94)	6.3 (0.25)	0.8 (0.03)	0.5 (0.02)	1.7 (0.07)	0.1 (0.00)	0.1 (0.00)	3.8 (0.15)	7.3 (0.29)	22.6 (0.89)	97.7 (3.84)
Average relative humidity (%)	62	63	60	51	47	56	68	72	69	59	60	62	61
Source: National Center of Meteorology&Seismology

== Demographics ==
Historical population
Year	Pop.	±% p.a.
1980	32,189	—
1985	43,753	+6.33%
1995	76,180	+5.70%
2005	125,698	+5.14%
2010	163,751	+5.43%
2017	236,811	+5.41%
2019	256,256	+4.02%
Source: Citypopulation

The Emirate of Fujairah had a population of 125,698 at the last census, held in 2005. Its population is around 225,360 inhabitants (in 2016); only the Emirate of Umm al-Quwain has fewer occupants. The 2019 population estimates is 256,256 inhabitants.

== Government ==
The Emirate of Fujairah is an absolute monarchy ruled by its Hakim, Sheikh Hamad bin Mohammed Al Sharqi.

The Sheikh heads the cabinet of the Emirate of Fujairah, and a few members of respected local families in the emirate make up the advisory committees. The Sheikh must ratify any decisions by the cabinet. After the ratification, such decisions may be enacted into law.

=== Rulers ===
- 1879–1936: Hamad bin Abdullah Al Sharqi
- 1936–1938: Saif bin Hamad Al Sharqi
- 1938–1974: Mohammed bin Hamad Al Sharqi
- 1974–present: Hamad bin Mohammed Al Sharqi

== Economy ==
The Emirate of Fujairah's economy is based on subsidies and federal government grants distributed by the government of Abu Dhabi (the seat of power in the UAE). Local industries consist of cement, stone crushing, and mining. A resurgence in the construction activity helped the local industry. There is a flourishing free trade zone, mimicking the success of the Dubai Free Zone Authority which was established around Jebel Ali Port.

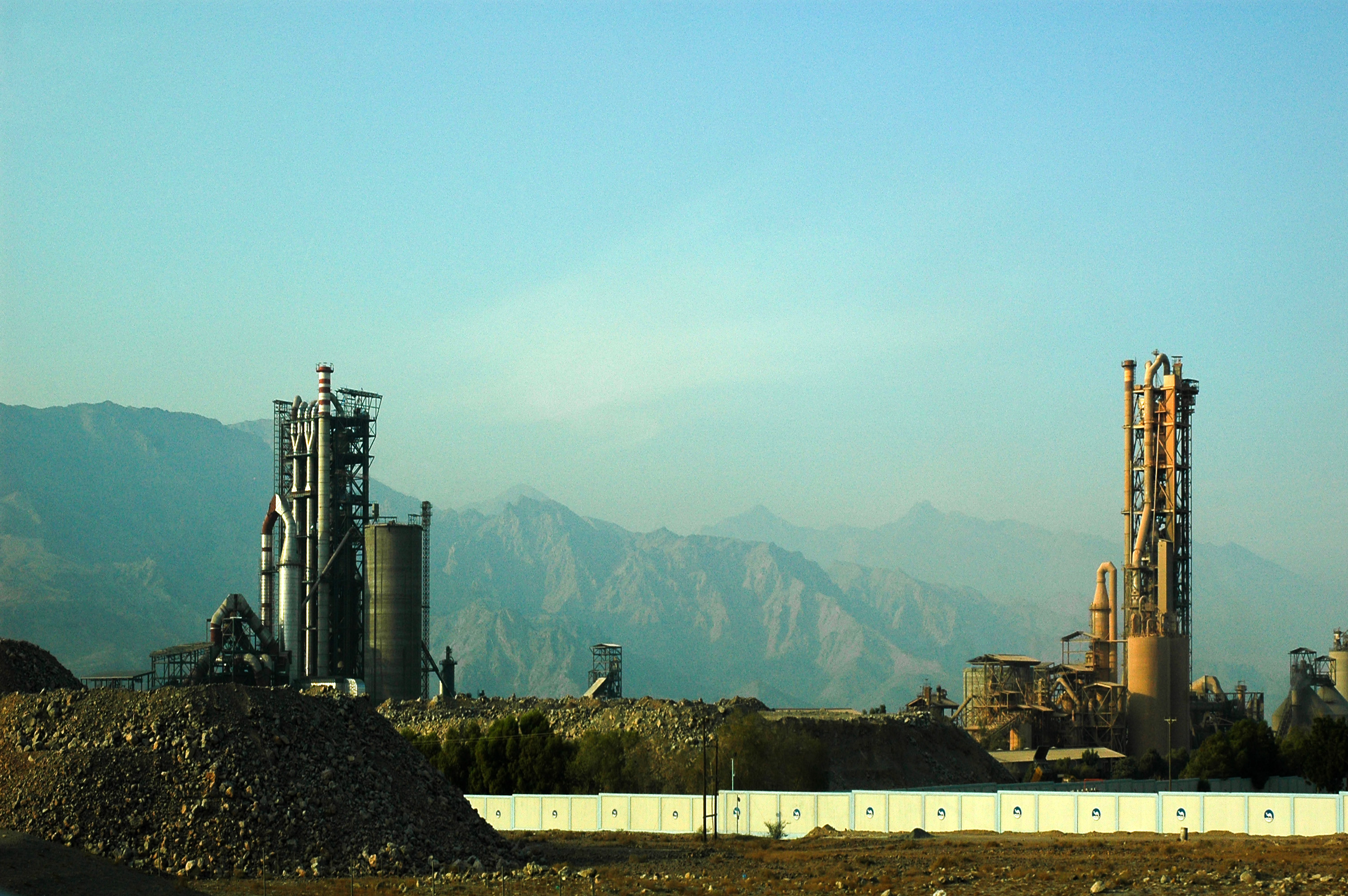
Cement Factory in Dibba

National Bank of Fujairah

The federal government employs the majority of the native, local workforce, with few opening businesses of their own. Many of the locals work in the service sector. The government of the Emirate of Fujairah prohibits foreigners from owning more than 49% of any business. The free zones have flourished, partly due to the relaxation of such prohibition within the zones, as full foreign ownership is allowed there. Shaikh Saleh Al Sharqi, younger brother to the ruler, is widely recognized as the driving force behind the commercialization of the economy.

The Emirate of Fujairah is a minor bunkering port.

The government of The Emirate of Fujairah is a major shareholder in the National Bank of Fujairah, a UAE local bank. Incorporated in 1982, the National Bank of Fujairah (NBF) is active in the areas of corporate and commercial banking, trade finance and treasury. NBF has also expanded portfolio to include personal banking options and Shariah-compliant services. NBF supports industries ranging from oil and shipping to services, manufacturing, construction, education, and healthcare.

=== Land ===
Foreigners or visitors are not allowed to buy land. Emirati nationals can purchase land from the government, after proving their nationality. If there is no suitable land available via the official government offices, private purchases can also be made, with the eventual price being determined by the market and the individuals themselves.

== Developments ==
The ruler is planning to make changes that will affect the Emirate of Fujairah. Among tourism projects is an $817m resort, Al-Fujairah Paradise, near Dibba Al-Fujairah, on the northern Omani border, next to Le Meridien Al Aqah Beach Resort. The planned development would have around 1,000 five-star villas as well as hotels, but has since been cancelled.

The Sheikh is trying to improve opportunities for the local workforce, by trying to entice businesses to locate in the Emirate of Fujairah and diverting Federal funds to local companies in the form of development projects.

The Habshan–Fujairah oil pipeline was opened in 2012.

== Health care ==
Health care is delivered in a mixed public and private system. Locals are treated for free at the federal government hospitals, while foreigners have to pay for medical care. The national government funds the federal hospitals and subsidize health care with petrodollar revenues. There are criticisms that the government is not providing health care sufficiently for those with low income, who have to pay for critical treatment themselves.

The government of the Emirate of Fujairah has built clinics, known locally as "medical houses". These clinics complement and help lighten the load on the main Fujairah Hospital by allowing walk-in appointments and providing ancillary medical services. These clinics have turned out to be a success, visited by the local populace.

== Education ==
There are many government schools in the Emirate of Fujairah, which are mainly for Emirati people, besides some numbers of Arab residents. Aside from government schools, there are also private schools, and due to the majority of the population of the Emirate hailing from the Indian subcontinent, most of the private schools follow the Indian Central Board of Secondary Education (CBSE) syllabus, accredited by the Central Education Board of India.

- Our Own English High School, Fujairah (which also provides International General Certificate of Secondary Education (IGCSE)), in the Al Faseel area.
- St. Mary's Catholic High School, Fujairah (which also provides General Certificate of Education (GCE) A levels), in the Sakamkam area.
- Diyar International Private School, Fujairah and Dibba branch. It is located in Sakamkam, Fujairah and Dibba area.
- Indian School Fujairah, in the Al Faseel area.
- Fujairah Private Academy, also provides International General Certificate of Secondary Education (IGCSE), A level, AS Level.
- Pakistan Islamia School, Fujairah, also in the Al Faseel area.
- Applied Technology High School, Fujairah
- GEMS Winchester, Fujairah (which also provides International General Certificate of Secondary Education (IGCSE)), in the Al Faseel area.

Fujairah Montessori Nursery is the oldest pre-school in the Emirate of Fujairah. It admits children from the age of two years. It is located in the Al Faseel area. There are several nursery and kindergarten schools in the Emirate of Fujairah. 'Superbaby' in Al Faseel 'Smart kids', 'Mom and Kids' and 'Little Stars' are used by expat families.

== Travel ==
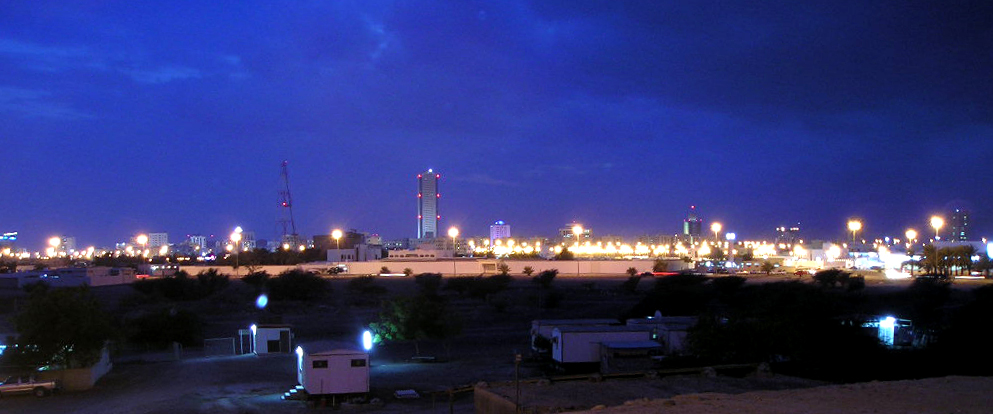
A view of Fujairah at night

Travel in and around the Emirate of Fujairah and the surrounding towns of Khor Fakkan, Kalba and Masafi has been made easy by the development of modern highways since independence in 1971. Highways are funded by the federal government directly, and contracts are tendered centrally. This is meant to safeguard the quality and delivery of the contracts and prevent corruption from damaging the construction.

As of 2014, the Emirate of Fujairah had very limited public transport, with a single bus service operating within the emirate and two bus services, with one operating to Sharjah via Al Dhaid (116 and 611 route) from the SRTA and another service (E700 from RTA) operating to Dubai. Aside from private transport, there are several taxis operated by the government-owned Emirate of Fujairah Transport Corporation (FTC).

The Sheikh Khalifa Highway linking Dubai and Fujairah was officially inaugurated on Saturday, 4 December 2011, following delays to the originally scheduled opening date of July 2011. It is a road that shortens the distance by 20 to 30 km (12 to 19 miles). The Fujairah International Airport is near the city, with a large falcon statue at the airport roundabout. However, as of 2015, it only offers commercial service to Abu Dhabi, a domestic destination within the UAE.

== Shopping ==
LuLu Mall Fujairah opened in 2014. City Centre Fujairah opened in April 2012 with 105 units along with Century Mall near the Fujairah Ports. The construction of the Fujairah Mall was completed in 2016. Fathima Shopping Center in Fujairah is another shopping destination.

== Transport ==
The Emirate of Fujairah is connected to other emirates by a 45-kilometre-long (28 mi) highway called Sheikh Khalifa bin Zayed Highway and links Dubai and Sharjah to Fujairah within a 30 minutes drive. The road begins from the entrance of Fujairah, crossing Al Gazirmi locality, Wadi Sahm, Asfeeni, Mamdooh, Kadra and Shawka Valleys in Ras Al Khaimah, and ends at Maliha Road in Sharjah, at Hamda area.

== Culture ==
The UAE culture mainly revolves around the religion of Islam and traditional Arab culture. The influence of Islamic and Arab culture on its architecture, music, attire, cuisine, and lifestyle are very prominent as well. Five times every day, Muslims are called to prayer from the minarets of mosques which are scattered around the country. Since 2006, the weekend has been Friday-Saturday, as a compromise between Friday's holiness to Muslims and the Western weekend of Saturday-Sunday. However as of January 2021 it has been changed to Saturday-Sunday to align with the rest of the world and make trading with other countries easy and efficient.

Drinking alcohol is allowed at designated hotels, and as of 2000, at a few bars. Until 1998, gambling in the form of slot machines was allowed in certain hotels, but personal petitions by locals to the Sheikh outlawed the activity.

Groups of Emirati youths tend to socialize together on the streets and cafés or outside games arcades, cinemas, and mini-malls. It is unusual to see mixed-sex groups due to gender segregation in Emirati society.

On vacations, many Fujairah residents travel to western emirates such as Dubai and Abu Dhabi, for entertainment and shopping purposes. They also visit the Wadis surrounding the emirate on camping and hiking trips. At the same time, other emirates' residents visit the Emirate of Fujairah for relaxation purposes and to get away from the stifling heat of the desert. Watersports such as jet skis, windsurfing, waterskiing and diving are becoming more and more popular amongst both locals and tourists. Professional driving instructors can be found in Le Méridien or in Royal Beach Hotel, where one can obtain an International Driving License, for a fee.

== Gallery ==
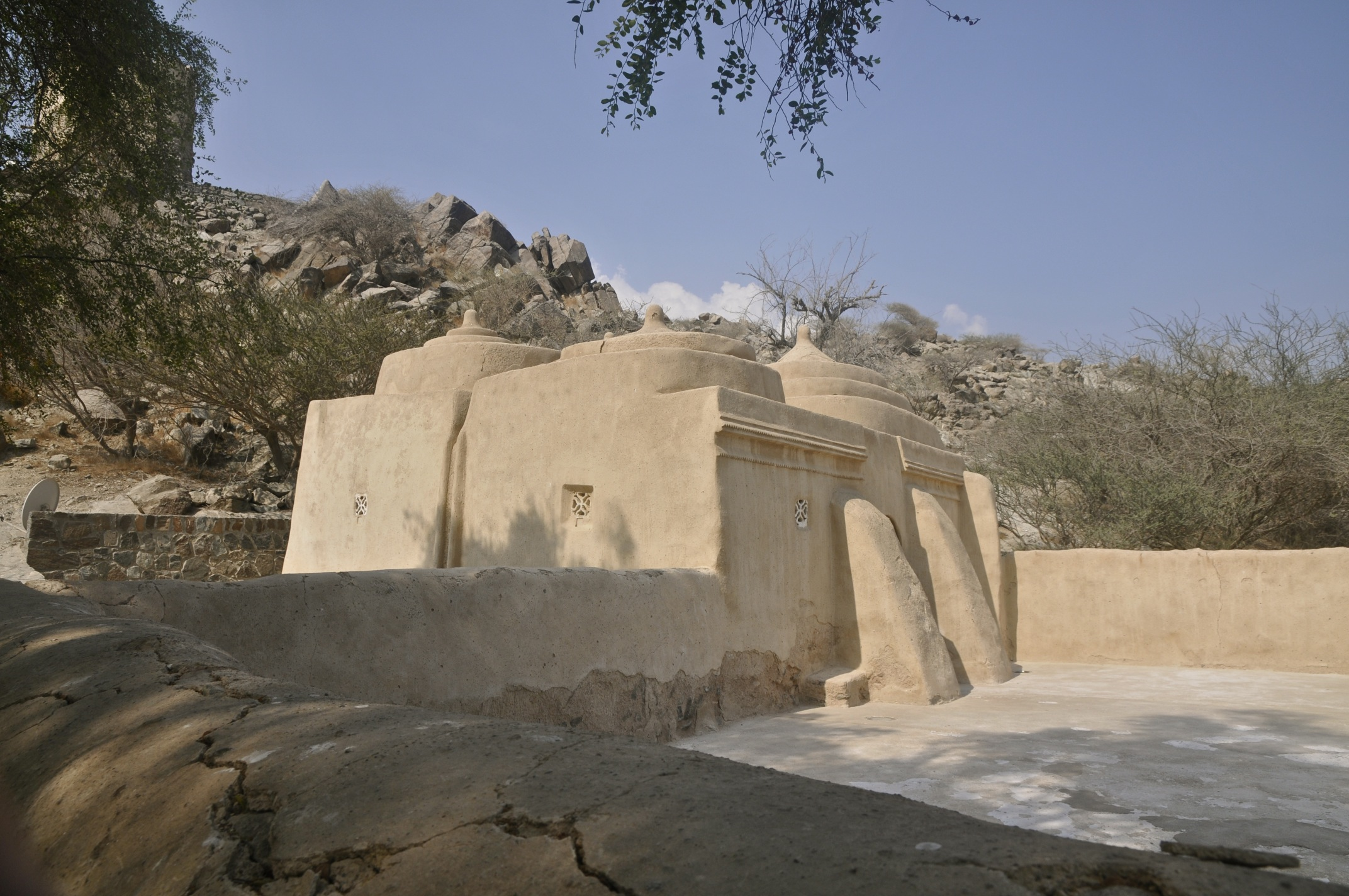
Al-Badiyah Mosque

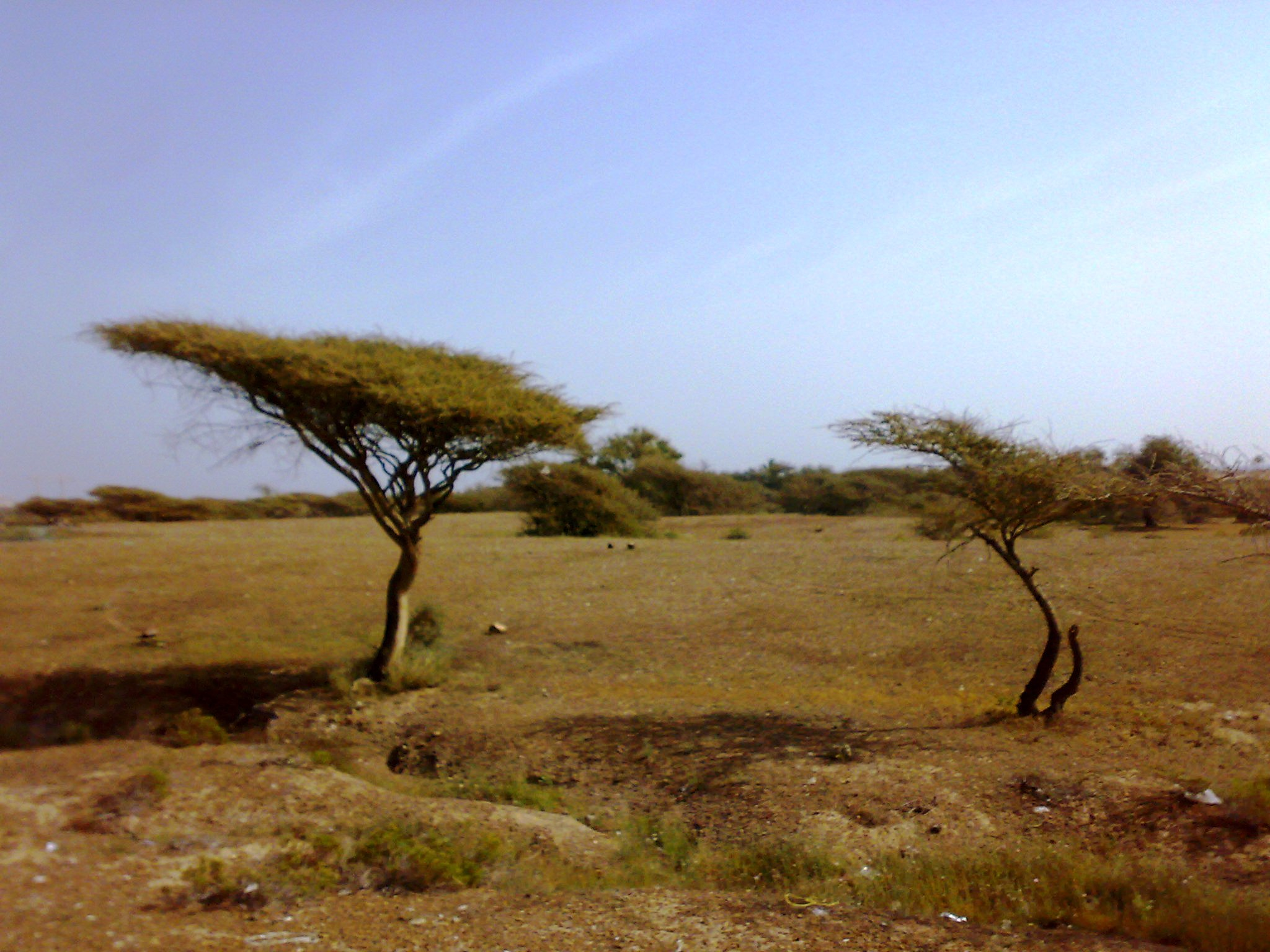
The countryside of Fujairah

Buildings on the north side of Hamad Bin Abdulla Road in Fujairah City

== See also ==
- Archaeology of the United Arab Emirates
- Creative City
- Ra's Diba
- Wadi Wurayah
