= Fujairah (disambiguation) =

Fujairah (Arabic: الفجيرة) is the capital of the emirate of Fujairah in the United Arab Emirates.

Fujairah may also refer to:

- Fujairah Beach
- Fujairah Corniche
- Fujairah FC
- Fujairah Fort
- Fujairah Free Zone
- Fujairah International Airport
- Fujairah Museum
- Fujairah Port
- Fujairah University
