= Tariq Rahim Soomro =

Pakistani Computer Scientist, Educator, Poet and Writer

- طارق رحیم سومرو طارق رحیم سومرو
- Prof. Dr. Tariq Rahim Soomro at Seminar in Karachi
- Born: 12 September 1970 (age 56); Village Dehat, Naushahro Feroze District, Sindh, Pakistan
- Education: Sindh University; Zhejiang University
- Website: www.drsoomro.com

Tariq Rahim Soomro (Sindhi: طارق رحیم سومرو; September 12, 1970) is a Pakistani Computer Scientist, Pakistani Educators, Columnist, Poet, and Writer. He is an active researcher and his Research focused on GIS, Big Data, IoT, IDNS, ITIL, Distance education, E-commerce, WAP, P2P, Cloud computing, Green computing, Quality of Software, Higher Education and Cybersecurity. He is currently working as Professor of Computer Science and Rector at Institute of Business Management, Karachi, Sindh, Pakistan.

== Education ==
Tariq Rahim Soomro received his B.Sc. (Hons) and M.Sc. degree in computer science from University of Sindh. Following this, he earned his Ph.D. Degree in 1999 from Zhejiang University, Hangzhou, China, under the supervision of Prof. Pan Yunhe and became the first Pakistani, who received all three degrees in the field of computer science. Dr. Soomro, also became the first and only Pakistani to be selected by the IEEE Computer Society to the ‘Inaugural Class of IEEE Computer Society Distinguished Contributors’ 2021 and first Pakistani to be selected by the IEEE Computer Society Distinguished Visitor 2021–2023.

== Career ==
Soomro served as computer programmer at Automation Center of National Assembly Secretariat, Parliament House, Islamabad, Pakistan from 1995 to 2003. From 2003 to 2017 Dr. Soomro served in United Arab Emirates (UAE); from 2003 to 2006 he served at Ajman University of Science & Technology, Al Ain, UAE, as an active faculty member of Computer Science. From 2006 to 2009 he served as coordinator IT department and coordinator academic affairs at University of Fujairah (formally Fujairah College), Fujairah, UAE. From 2009 to 2014 he served at Al Ain University of Science & Technology, Al Ain, UAE, as coordinator, Head of Science & Engineering Department. During 2014 he also served at Sindh Madressatul Islam University, Karachi, Pakistan as first Dean of Information Technology and Head of Academic Affairs. Later from 2014 to 2017 he served at SZABIST University Dubai Campus, Dubai, UAE as Program Manager BS and MS programs. Currently he is serving as Professor of Computer Science and Rector at the Institute of Business Management.

Soomro served as Chief Editor of Pakistan Journal of Engineering Technology & Science; and currently serving as Member Editorial Board, Journal of Geosciences and Geomatics; Member International Advisory Board of Applied and Social Sciences International Research Journal; Member Editorial Board International Information and Engineering Technology Association (IIETA). He is also Associate Editor of Asian Journal of Information Management and Journal of Software Engineering.

== Fellowships & Awards ==
- CSR Award 2025, by Multi Marketing Service, presented on January 26, 2026.
- Recipient of “10+ Years Achievement Award”, by Project Management Institute (PMI), Karachi Chapter, Pakistan, August 15, 2023.
- IEEE Distinguished Contributor, selected as first cohort of IEEE Computer Society Distinguished Contributors 2021
- IEEE Computer Society Distinguished Visitor (2021–2023)
- Recipient of Outstanding Scientist Award, an International Scientist Award on Engineering, Science and Medicine, held on 28 & 29-August 2021, Trivandrum, India, Organized by VDGOOD Professional Association.
- Recipient of Global CSR Achievers Certificate, February 25, 2021.
- Recipient of Global CSR Leadership Award November 1, 2020.
- Distinguished Researcher 2012 (Cash award received by AAU)
