= Cambridge Academy for Higher Education =

- اكاديمية كامبردج للدراسات العليا
- President: Prof. Saad M. Othman AlJaibeji
- Chairman: Dr. Saif AlJaibeji
- Location: Fujairah, United Arab Emirates
- Website: http://www.cahe.co.uk

Cambridge Academy for Higher Education (Arabic: اكاديمية كامبردج للدراسات العليا) is a Middle Eastern university for executive education and leadership programs with a campus in Fujairah at Fujairah Free Zone, United Arab Emirates. It offers degree programs including Master of Business Administration (MBA), Master of Management, Doctor of Business Administration (DBA), PhD programs, Master of Public Health (MPH), Master of Health Administration, Master of Health Economics, and Doctor in Public Health (DrPH). The School of Management program is a double master's degree in Business Administration and Health Administration MBA/MHA.

== Academic programs ==
At Cambridge Academy for Higher Education, every student's program is personalized. Teaching methods include case studies, lectures, peer-to-peer learning, group work, simulations and role-plays.

== Executive education ==
Executive education offered at Cambridge Academy for Higher Education includes courses in the fields of leadership, management, and business administration. Professional education covers programs specific to an industry or skill set, such as Human Resources.

=== Executive Education Committee ===
The Committee was formed in 2012 to develop and evaluate programs offered to the market. The Committee works with experts and business schools in the United States, the United Kingdom, and Europe to provide education programs and non-degree training programs.

== Institute of Healthcare Research ==
The Institute of Healthcare Research at Cambridge conducts studies carried out by researchers under the supervision of professors.

The Institute of Healthcare Research is the exclusive sponsor of Iraq Health, a non-profit, non-governmental think tank focusing on promoting the role of the private sector in the health system in Iraq. Iraq Health organizes the annual Iraq Health Conference & Exhibition and Iraq HealthCare Conference, among other activities in the country.

== Education management ==
The university has launched a business venture with an investment group in Abu Dhabi to modernize education in primary and secondary education. The plan is to expand within the United Arab Emirates.
