= FFZ =

FFZ or ffz may refer to:

- Falcon Field (Arizona), an airfield in Maricopa County
- Find first zero, a computer operation
- Fujairah Free Zone, a free port in the United Arab Emirates
