= Al-Islah School Museum =

Museum in Sharjah, UAE

Coordinates: 25.35825°N 55.38388°E

- General Information
- Established: 2003
- Location: Sharjah United Arab Emirates

Al-Islah School Museum, is one of the tourist attractions in the city of Sharjah, and a tourist attraction for the first regular school in Sharjah. It explains the history of education in the Emirate of Sharjah and its stages of development. It is considered one of the most important places that tourists and families can visit to learn about the educational civilization in the country, as it is suitable for all ages from different generations. It can be visited during weekdays after paying a small fee, with the exemption of entry fees for private and government school trips and children.

== School history ==
It was initially established under the name of Al-Taymiyyah Al-Mahmoudia School, as the first official educational school in the Emirate of Sharjah in 1935 in a village in the Al-Hirah region by Sheikh Muhammad bin Ali Al-Mahmoud, a religious and intellectual pioneer who managed it until 1948. As it was the usual method of teaching at that time, small groups of children received traditional Islamic lessons in the home of a religious scholar. The school was not only accessible to students from Sharjah, but also welcomed students from all over the Persian Gulf. Students from outside the region would spend their nights during term time in the lodgings on the upper floor of the school, or as it was called, the dormitory.

The work of the school was later moved to the house that forms the museum today. It was known as the Al-Islah School. Teachers were recruited from other Arab countries and the curriculum expanded beyond religion to include mathematics, history, geography, astronomy, literature, and even some English language lessons. It was one of the first schools in the region to educate girls. Later on, the school was renamed Al-Islah Al-Qasimia in the 1940s, in appreciation of Sheikh Sultan bin Saqr Al-Qasimi, the ruler of Sharjah at that time, who was one of its most prominent students.

== The conversion into a museum ==
The school was abandoned in the fifties after the opening of larger educational institutes in other regions. And it was restored and turned into a museum in the 1990s, therefore, the Al-Islah School Museum was opened in April 2003. Today, the museum still maintains the wooden benches of which the pioneers of science studied to receive the correct Islamic religious and educational teachings, and the umbrellas that were placed to protect the students from the sun rays. In addition to black boards, chalk, introductory and educational panels, pictures of the students, and pictures of the most important scholars who contributed to building this school and teaching in it. The museum also includes the school principal's room, which contains many of the Holy Qur'an levers that were made in the past using palm fronds.

== See also ==
- Sharjah Maritime Museum
- Fujairah Museum
- Etihad Museum
