= Sakamkam Fort =

Coordinates: 25.173101°N 56.334909°E

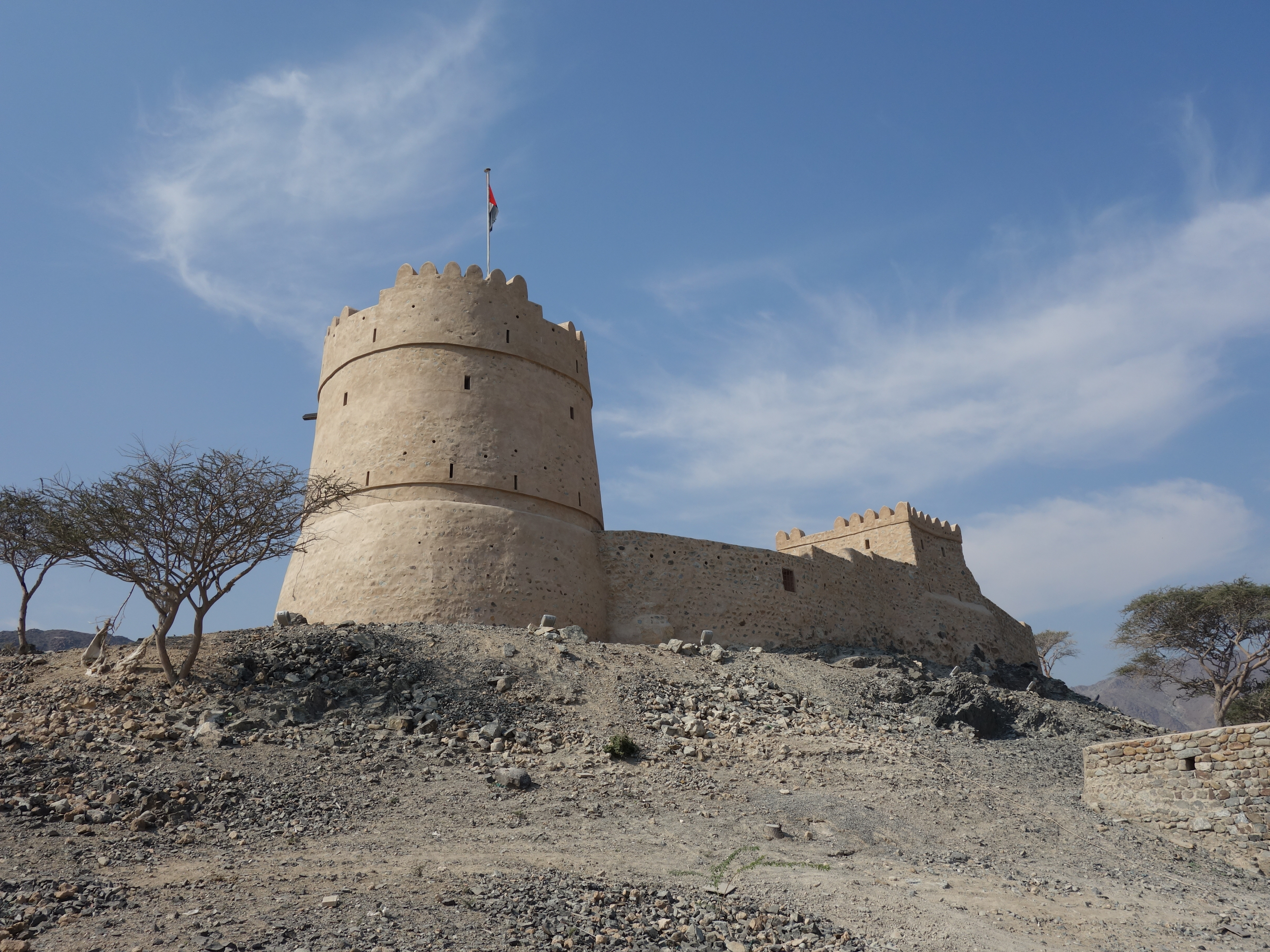
The Sakamkam Fort

Sakamkam Fort is a historic fort in Sakamkam, just north of Fujairah City, Emirate of Fujairah, United Arab Emirates.

The fort, on a hilly position, became ruined, but has now been restored. It has a round watchtower, with views of the modern Fujairah City, where Fujairah Fort is located.

Sakamkam Fort is close to the Fujairah Free Zone, to the east.

== History ==
Sakamkam Fort was built in 1879 by Hamad bin Abdullah Al Sharqi, the local headman, on a hill overlooking the Sakamkam area. During the 19th century it served principally as a defensive outpost of the nearby Fujairah Fort, monitoring and protecting the surrounding district against raids and tribal conflict. The fort was also a focus of village life, where residents gathered to discuss local affairs and where festivals and celebrations were held in the square before it.

== Architecture ==
The fort was constructed from local materials – black stone, mud and palm fronds – on an elevated, rocky position. It is dominated by a round watchtower commanding a panoramic view over Fujairah City, with two walled enclosures separated by two buildings on its western side.

== See also ==
Other local forts:

- Al Bithnah Fort
- Fujairah Fort
