= FIMC =

FIMC may stand for:

- Fellowship of Independent Methodist Churches, a Methodist connexion in the conservative holiness movement
- Fujairah International Marine Club, a recreational boating club
