= Madhab Palace =

Palace in UAE

Coordinates: 25.136943°N 56.321546°E

Madhab Palace is a palace located in the Madhab district on the northwest edge of Fujairah City, Emirate of Fujairah, United Arab Emirates (UAE). It is close to Fujairah Heritage Village and Madhab Spring Park.

The palace is the official residence of the ruler of Fujairah, His Highness Sheikh Hamad bin Mohammed Al Sharqi, and is used to receive official guests. The square in front of the palace is used for the celebration of Eid with a music festival, along with Madhab Park and the Fujairah Corniche.
