= WAPS =

WAPS may refer to:

- WAPS (FM), a radio station (91.3 FM) licensed to Akron, Ohio, United States
- Weighted Airman Promotion System
- Western Australia Police Service
- Wind Assisted Propulsion System (WAPS)
- Winona Area Public Schools, a school district in Minnesota also known as Independent School District 861

== See also ==
- Wasp
- WAP (disambiguation)
