= Hamad Bin Abdulla Road =

Road in Fujairah City, United Arab Emirates

Coordinates: 25.122325°N 56.33416625°E

High-rise buildings on the north side of Hamad Bin Abdullah Road

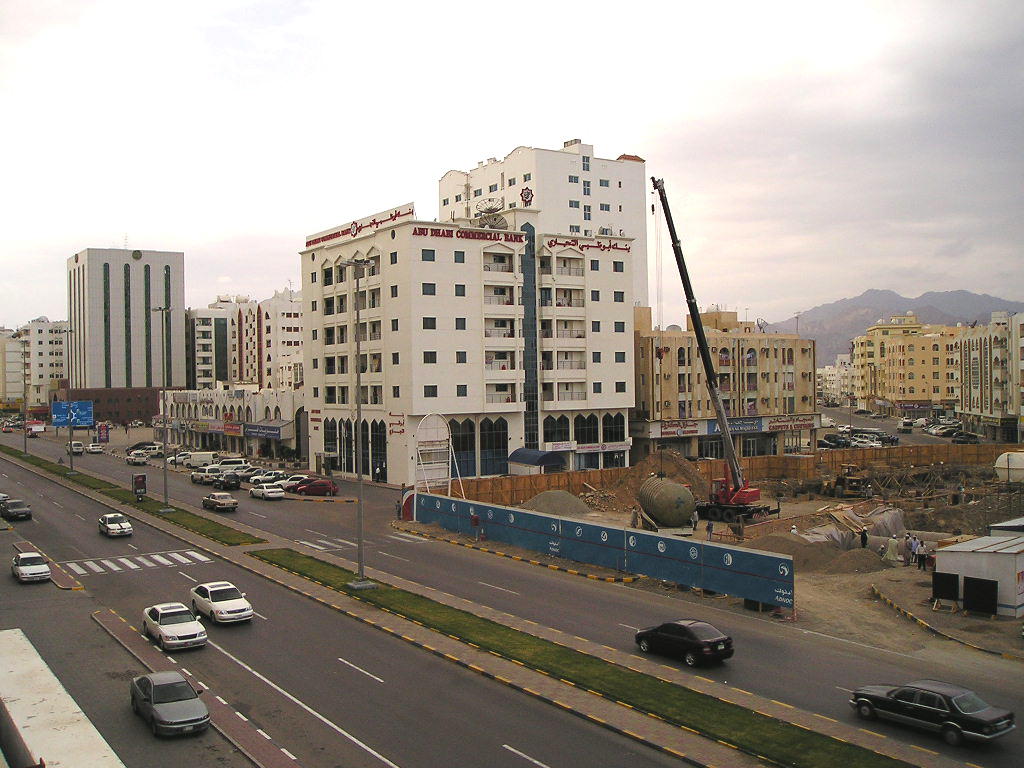
Buildings under construction on Hamad Bin Abdulla Road

Hamad Bin Abdulla Road is the main road running east–west through Fujairah City, Emirate of Fujairah, United Arab Emirates.

Hamad Bin Abdulla Road is a hub for the business and commercial centre of Fujairah City. It is lined with tall office buildings (e.g., Fujairah Tower) and hotels. The main mosque, the large white Sheikh Zayed Mosque, the second largest in the UAE, is to the north of the road. The LuLu Mall Fujairah is to the south. The University of Fujairah is located on the road.

At the western end, the road continues as the Sheikh Khalifa Bin Zayed Expressway (a.k.a. Sheikh Khalifa Highway), a dual carriageway road, linking Fujairah City with Dubai and other parts of the UAE. At the eastern end, the road reaches the Fujairah Corniche and the Al Corniche Road, going north and south close to the seafront. Near this point are the Central Market and Fabric Souk, and the Fish & Vegetable Market.
