= Madhab Spring Park =

Coordinates: 25.140970°N 56.316884°E

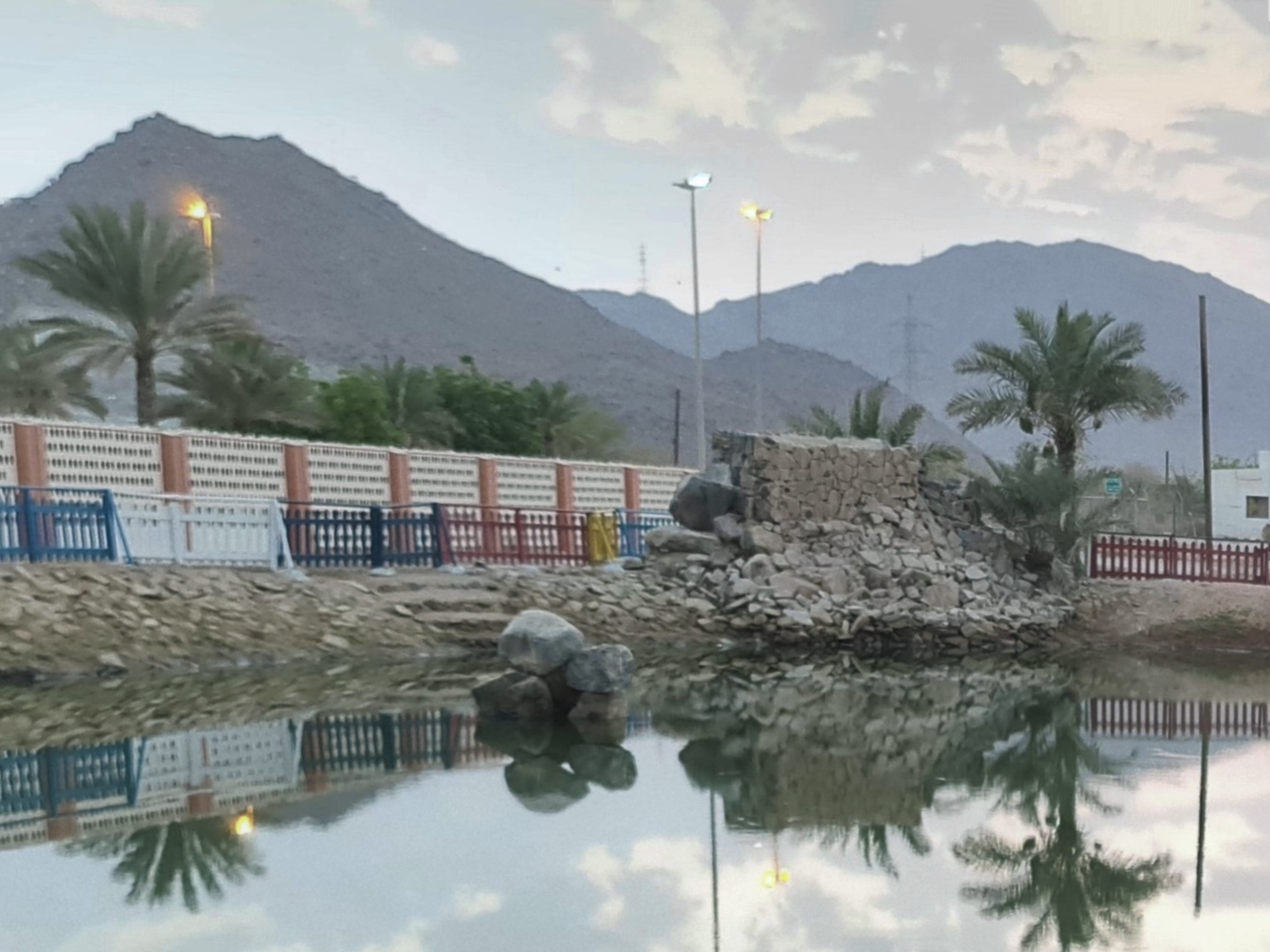
This pond is at the far end of the park.

Madhab Spring Park (aka Madhab Sulpheric Spring Park) is a park, mineral spring, and tourist attraction located close to Fujairah Heritage Village, northwest of Fujairah City, Emirate of Fujairah, United Arab Emirates (UAE).

The park is located under the foothills of the Hajar Mountains, inland of Fujairah City. It has grass and trees, under which it is possible to picnic. The source of the mineral spring is on the edge of the park, feeding two swimming pools. The park is open daily. The park covers 39,000 square metres and was upgraded in 2016.

== See also ==
- Madhab Palace
