= Creative City =

Emirati free economic zone

- Company type: Free economic zone
- Founded: 2005; 21 years ago
- Headquarters: Fujairah City, United Arab Emirates
- Key people: Amgad Badar Shurrab (Managing Director)
- Owner: Fujairah Government
- Website: www.creativecity.ae

Creative City (aka Fujairah Creative City – FCC) is a media free zone government-owned company in Fujairah, United Arab Emirates.

== Overview ==
FCC was launched by Fujairah Media as an alternative to Dubai Media City, aims to attract regional and international broadcast TV and radio providers to Fujairah in the United Arab Emirates, while also providing creative media-related services.

The first phase of the development secured USD50 million. The free zone will be a 200,000 m^{2} (2,200,000 sq ft) complex and will be located alongside the Sheikh Khalifa Highway, in turn connecting it to the Emirates Road leading to Dubai. The first phase was completed in 2007.

The following types of licenses will be available in Fujairah Creative City:

1. Publishing
2. Management of broadcasting
3. Marketing and Media Services
4. Music and Entertainment
5. Consultancy
6. Broadcasting
7. Production/Post production/Filming
8. Information Technology Services

== See also ==
- Fujairah Free Zone
- Censorship in the United Arab Emirates
- Egyptian Media Production City
