= Fujairah Heritage Village =

Tourist attraction in Fujairah City, United Arab Emirates

Coordinates: 25.140693°N 56.312902°E

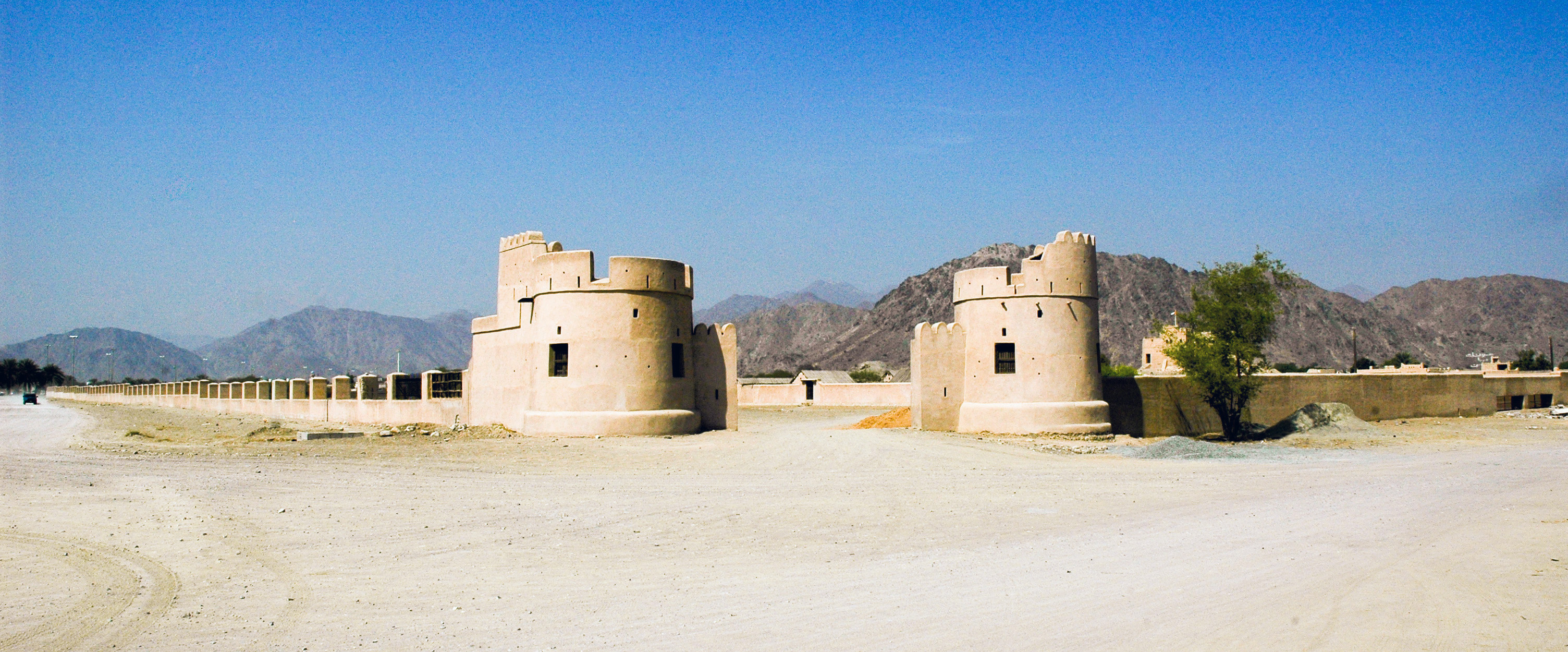
Entrance to Fujairah Heritage Village, on the edge of Fujairah City

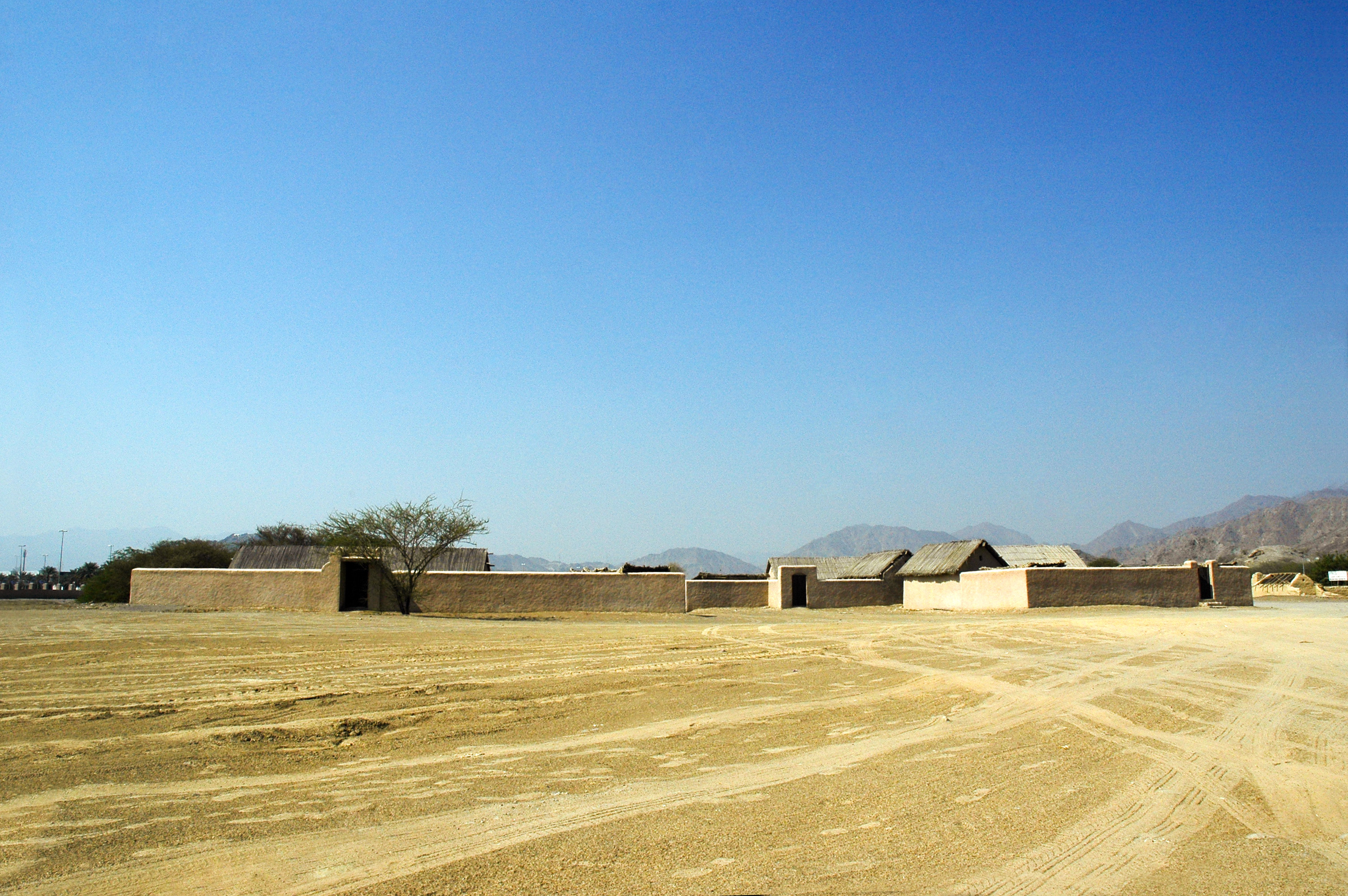
View of the wall around Fujairah Heritage Village

Fujairah Heritage Village is a heritage-based tourist attraction located close to Madhab Spring Park and Madhab Palace, northwest of Fujairah City, Emirate of Fujairah, United Arab Emirates (UAE).

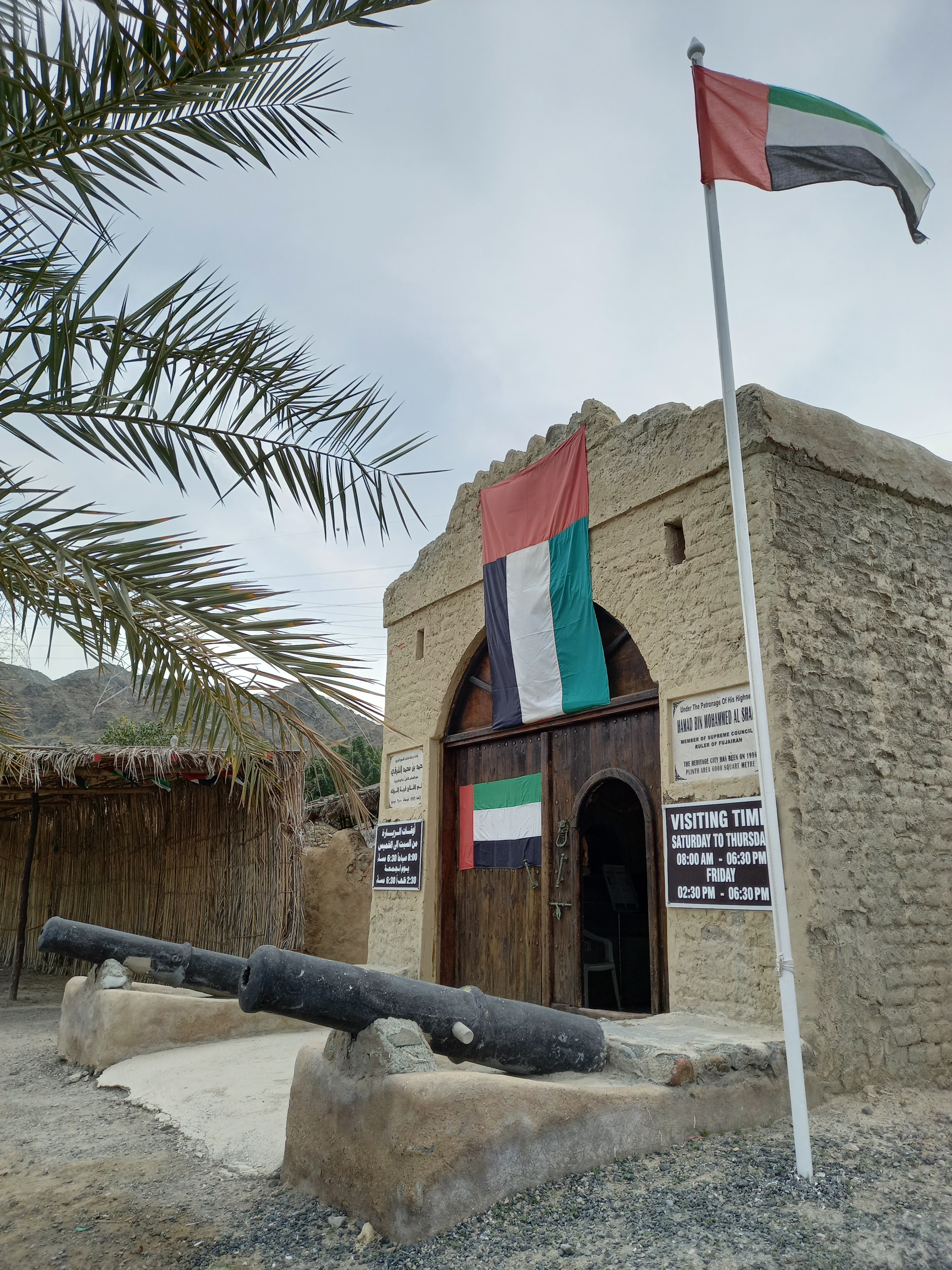
Fujairah Heritage Village

The site is used to present customs and traditions of the UAE. It includes traditional hand-held implements, household items, models of traditional homes, and tools as used by historical people in Fujairah. The Heritage Village is surrounded by a high wall with round watchtowers. There are tours to the Heritage Village.
