= Sakamkam =

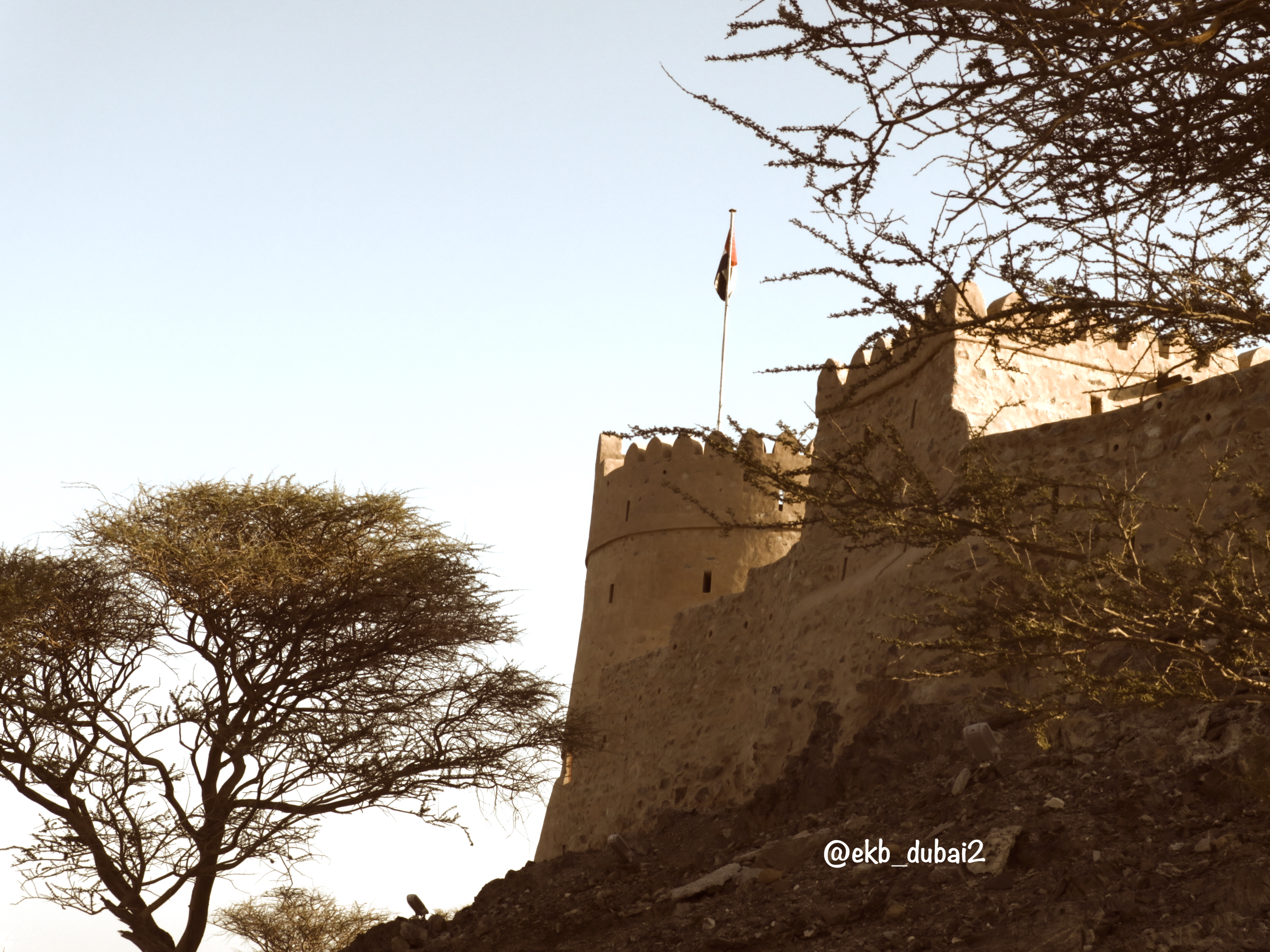
- Sakamkam Fort

- Location within United Arab Emirates
- Coordinates: 25°10′25″N 56°20′1″E
- Country: United Arab Emirates
- Emirate: Fujairah
- Elevation: 131 m (430 ft)

Sakamkam is a wadi and settlement in Fujairah, United Arab Emirates (UAE). Sakamkam Fort is located here.

The area is located some 7 km north of the city of Fujairah. Archaeological finds here have been particularly rich, with some 126 burials located, including oval, circular and the characteristic Wadi Suq period figure-of-eight burial. A number of Late Islamic period ceramics have also been found in the wadi, dating from the 15th-18th centuries.

Surveys of the burials and settlement remains in the wadi started in the 1980s, by a Swiss team. Further surveys were requested in 2001 and 2002 by utility companies installing infrastructure and were carried out by the Abu Dhabi Islands Archaeological Survey, ADIAS.
