= Port of Fujairah =

- Interactive map of Port of Fujairah
- Location in United Arab Emirates

Location
- Country: United Arab Emirates
- Location: Fujairah
- Coordinates: 25°11′17″N 56°21′35″E
- UN/LOCODE: AEFJR

Details
- Opened: 1983
- Operated by: Port of Fujairah Authority
- Type of harbour: coastal breakwater
- No. of berths: 33
- Draft depth: 16.5 m.
- Harbour Master: Captain Mayed Alameiry

Statistics
- Website www.fujairahport.ae

The Port of Fujairah (Arabic: ميناء الفجيرة), also called Fujairah Port, is a deep port located in Fujairah, United Arab Emirates, on the Gulf of Oman. It is the largest port on the eastern seaboard of the United Arab Emirates and the world second largest bunkering hub.

== History ==
Construction of the port started on 1978 as part of the economic development of Fujairah and container operations commenced in 1982. The port assumed full operation on 1983. Two oil terminals were also constructed on the port. The first oil terminal commenced operation in January 2006, while the second oil terminal commenced operation in June 2010.

=== May 2019 Gulf of Oman incident ===
On the morning of 12 May 2019, a pro-Hezbollah news channel Al Mayadeen falsely reported that seven oil tankers were involved in an explosion in the Port of Fujairah. The news report was quickly picked up by Press TV and other news outlets. The United Arab Emirates denied any explosions on the port and stated that the port continues to operate normally. The UAE Ministry of Foreign Affairs and International Cooperation later released a statement that four ships off the port of Fujairah in UAE territorial waters were targeted in a "sabotage attack". One ship was flying the UAE flag and another was flying the Norwegian flag while two Saudi oil tankers were also among the targeted ships. No casualties were reported and no oil or chemical spills occurred. The UAE requested assistance from the US in launching an investigation probe to determine the cause of the damage. The assessment determined that 5-to-10-foot (1.5 to 3.0 m) holes near or below all the ships water line were likely caused by explosive charges. The US military team that assessed the blasts initial investigation blamed Iran or Iranian-backed proxies of causing the attack. The US issued new warnings to commercial ship of acts of sabotage targeting ships in the Middle East.

== Port facilities ==
The port has two bulk loaders for exports, the first loader is capable of loading 2,000 tons per hour while the second loader is capable of loading 4,000 tons per hour.

The port consists of two breakwater berths; a southern and a northern breakwater berth. The southern breakwater berth has 840 meters (2,760 ft) of general cargo berth and a draft of 15 m (49 ft). The southern breakwater berth is the common site for repairing vessels and has a travel lift facility for vessel maintenance and repair. The northern breakwater berth hosts two oil terminals.

The port is expanding its operational capacity to enable the handling of larger vessels and provide more services. The port is expected to install advanced cargo lifting equipment by 2021. The port is connected to the Etihad Rail linking the industrial city of Ruwais in the western region of the UAE to the town of Ghuwaifat close to the Saudi border and then to Fujairah in the east. The rail in Fujairah is used to carry bulk containers and oil.

UAE-based Brooge Petroleum and Gas Investment Company announced plans to set up an oil refinery to produce bunker fuel with a capacity of 250,000 barrel per day (bpd) in the port. The facility will be the first in the Middle East and North Africa to comply with the new IMO 2020 regulations of the International Maritime Organization by capping sulfur content in shipping fuels. The first phase of the project is expected to be finished in the first quarter of 2020.

== Strategic location ==
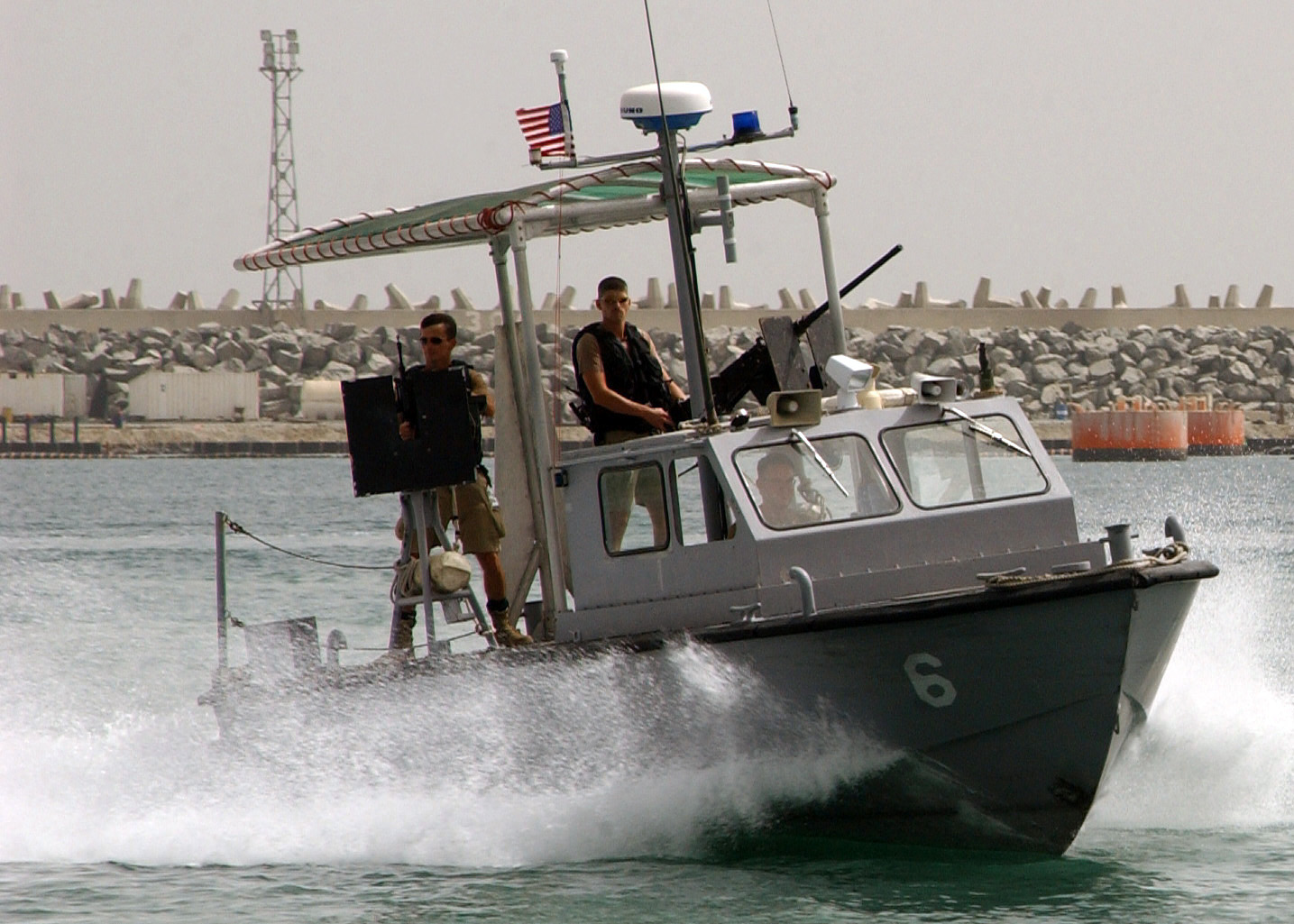
US Navy boat patrolling waters around Port of Fujairah.

The Port of Fujairah has a strategic location being connected to all the emirates within 300 km (190 mi) and located on the only eastern seaboard of the United Arab Emirates.

Fujairah location as a bunkering hub occurred as a result of the Iran–Iraq War in the 1980s, when the Strait of Hormuz was mined by the Iranian military and tankers were targeted by Iran. As the United States launched Operation Earnest Will to protect oil tankers from being targeted, vessels lined up to enter the Persian Gulf in convoys and Fujairah was established as an anchorage for tankers and a bunkering hub.

Due to the increasing Iranian threats of closing the Strait of Hormuz to international shipping, in July 2012 the UAE began using the new Habshan–Fujairah oil pipeline from the Habshan fields in Abu Dhabi to the Fujairah oil terminal on the Gulf of Oman, effectively bypassing the Strait of Hormuz. It has a maximum capacity of around 2 million barrels per day, over three-fourths of the UAE's 2012 production rate, effectively allowing the UAE to export oil without concerns of the increasing threats from Iran to close the strait. The UAE is also increasing Fujairah's storage and off-loading capacities. The UAE is building the world's largest crude oil storage facility in Fujairah with a capacity of holding 14 million barrels to enhance Fujairah's growth as a global oil and trading hub. The Habshan – Fujairah route secures the UAE's energy security and has the advantage of being a ground oil pipeline transportation which is considered the cheapest form of oil transportation and also reduces war-risk ship insurance costs as oil tankers would no longer enter the Persian Gulf. The port is also a logistical land link to the Port of Jebel Ali, the biggest and busiest port in the Middle East.

During the 2026 Iran war and the 2026 Iranian strikes on the United Arab Emirates, Fujairah was also targeted. On 3 and 4 March, debris from drone interceptions fell down, causing damage to two oil storage tanks, burning and releasing dark plumes of smoke into the sky, while another had burned. On 9 March, similar attacks shut down the oil terminal, so only storage was available for bunkering. On 12 March, the terminal was partially operating again to replenish storage and bunkering. On 14 March, Iranian drones reportedly struck the port, causing fires and the suspension of some oil-loading operations. Debris from the attack fell onto parts of it, but no casualties were reported. The oil loading was stopped, but reopened on 15 March. On March 16, another attack closed the oil operations.

== Security ==
The United Arab Emirates Navy has a naval base located on the port. The Fujairah Naval Base offers protection to oil tankers and ensures the safety of the oil export route.

== See also ==
- Fujairah Free Zone
