= Fujairah International Marine Club =

Marine club in UAE

Coordinates: 25.126902°N 56.356937°E

Fujairah International Marine Sports Club
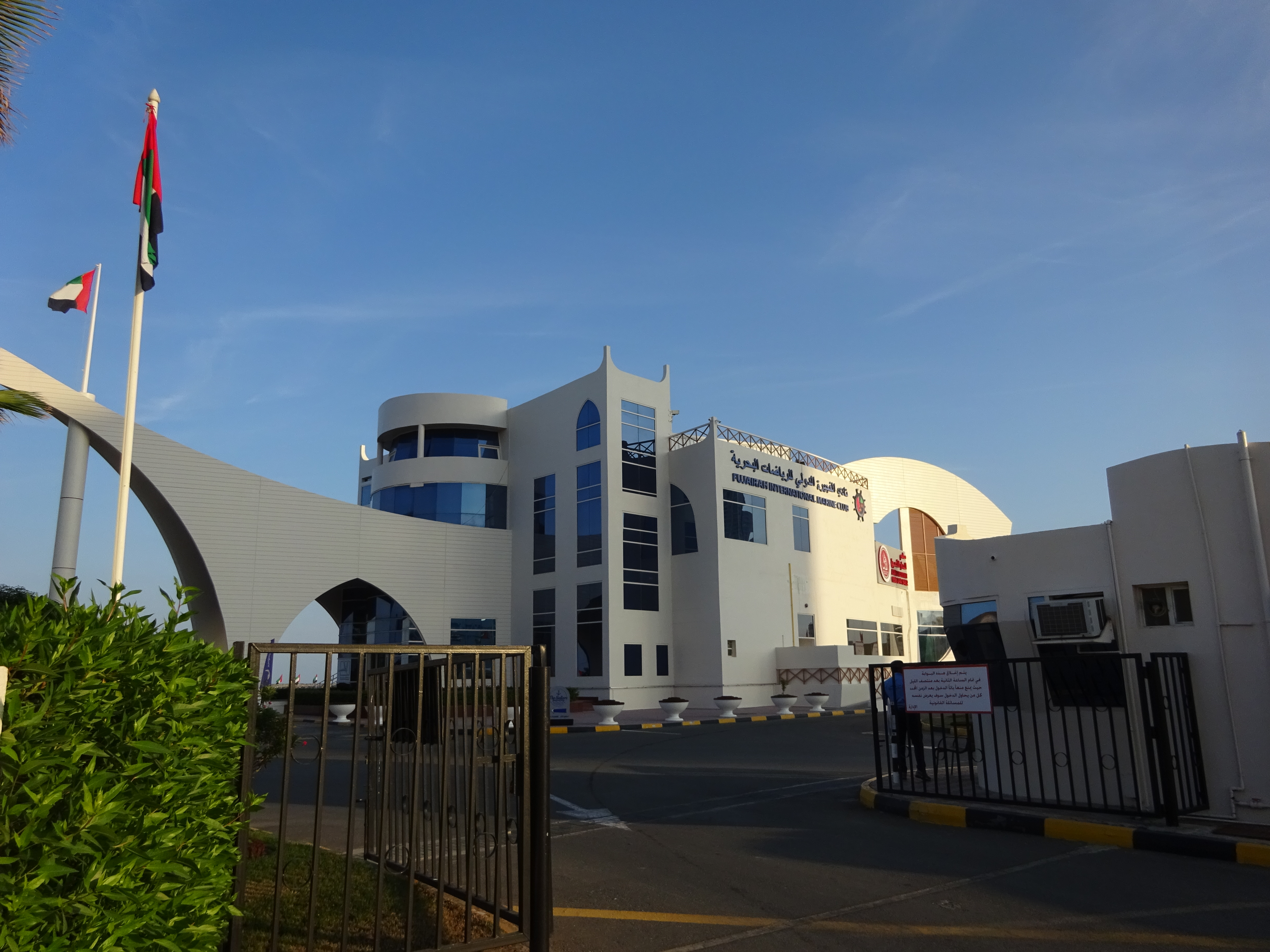
- Entrance to the club
- Abbreviation: FIMSC (formerly FIMC)
- Formation: 1999
- Purpose: Marine sports club
- Headquarters: Fujairah City, Fujairah
- Location: UAE
- Region served: Fujairah
- Website: fimc.ae
- Formerly called: Fujairah International Marine Club

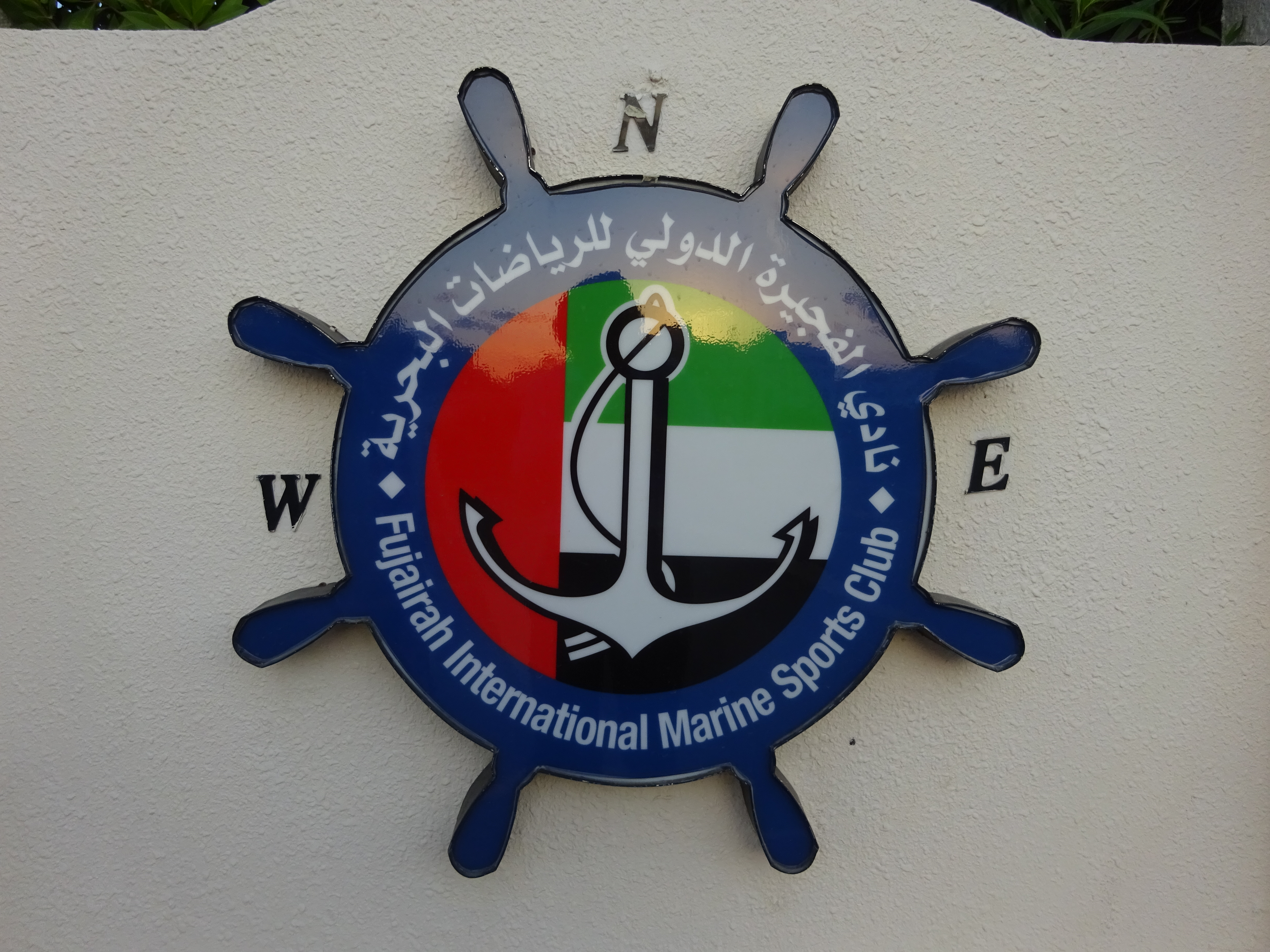
Fujairah International Marine Sports Club logo

The Fujairah International Marine Club (FIMC, now rebranded as the Marine Sports Club) is a club dedicated to recreational boating in Fujairah City, Emirate of Fujairah, United Arab Emirates.

FIMC was founded in 1999, with the patronage of Sheikh Hamad bin Mohammed Al Sharqi, the Ruler of Fujairah. Facilities include fishing trips, jet skiing and speed boats. FIMC organizes deep sea fishing trips. There is a small beach and also a diving club. The club has marina berthing facilities for 120 boats, with a workshop for repairs. The club also organizes championships (e.g., the annual Formula 2000 powerboat championships and jet ski competitions) and other events (e.g., dhow sailing races). There are restaurants and a bar at the club.

The club is located on the Fujairah Corniche, off Al Corniche Road. To the north at the Hilton Fujairah hotel and beyond that Fujairah Beach.

== See also ==
- Dubai International Marine Club
