= Fujairah Fort =

16th century fort in the UAE

Coordinates: 25.138726°N 56.336978°E

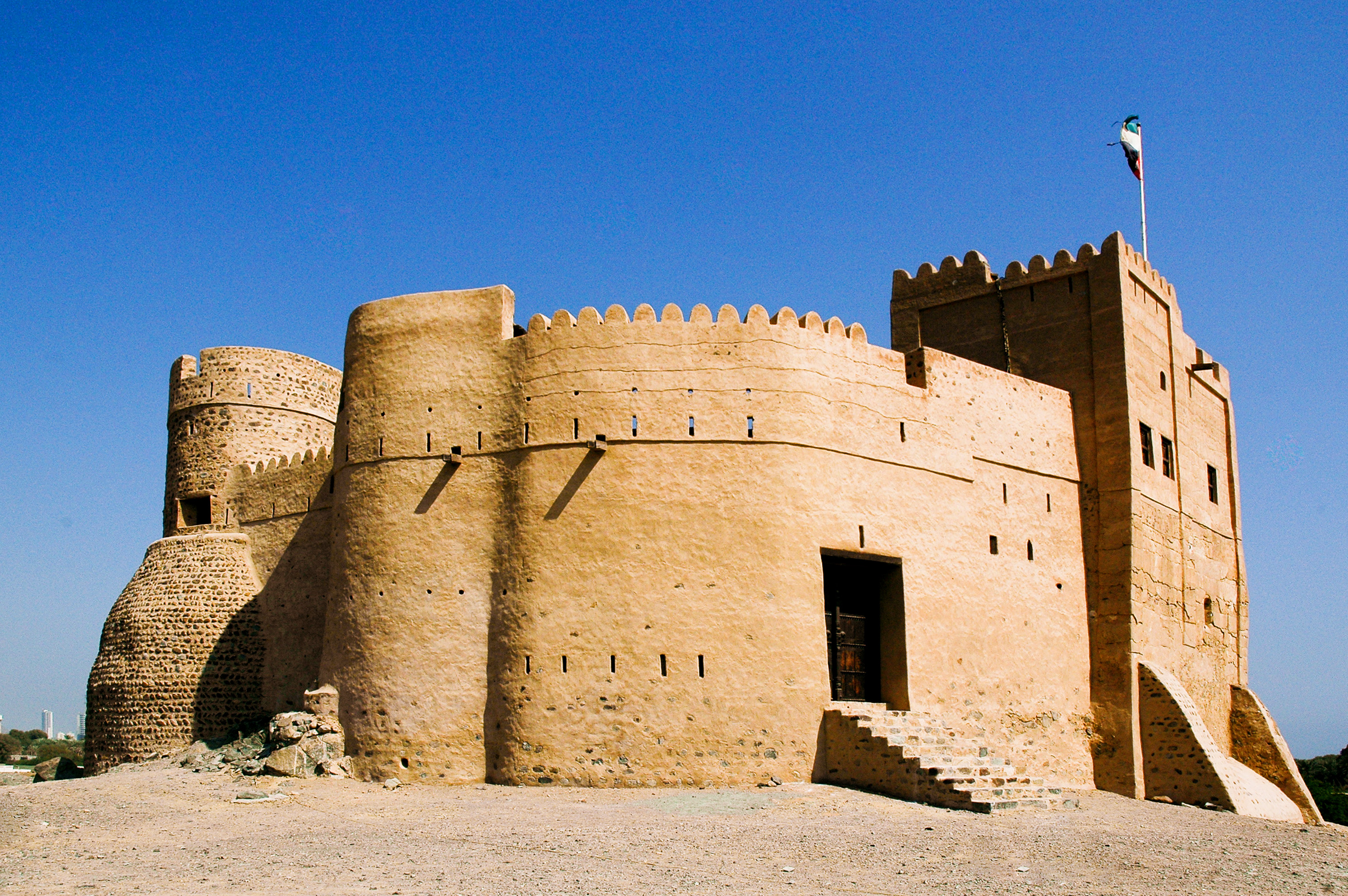
View of the fort

Fujairah Fort (Arabic: قلعة الفجيرة) is a fort in the city of Fujairah, United Arab Emirates (UAE). Dating back to the 16th century, it is among the oldest as well as the largest castles in the country. Today, it is among the main tourist attractions in the city. It is thought to be one of the oldest forts in the UAE.

== Location ==
The fort is located about 2 km from central modern Fujairah in the old Fujairah region, on a small rocky hill which reaches 20 meters high. It is around 1 km away from the coast.

== Architecture ==
The fort is part of a complex with several old houses and a mosque. It is guarded by three round watchtowers and a square watchtower. The watchtowers and main building are connected by the walls, and there is a central hall surrounded by these towers and wall. The irregular shape of the castle is due to the uneven surface of the rock it sits on. The building is built of local materials, mostly rocks, gravels, mud, hay and plasters.

== History ==
Wahhabists occupied multiple forts across the eastern coast of the Arabian Pennusula, including Fujairah Fort, from 1808 to 1810, before being driven out by the locals. The fort was used as a prison up to the 1900s.

The British Navy destroyed three of the towers in 1925 during an action enforcing British anti-slavery policy. The bombardment was by HMIS Lawrence. After this incident the fort was abandoned and neglected until 1997.

== Restoration and Role Today ==
The fort was restored by the Fujairah Administration of Antiquity and Heritage during 1997/2000 using the same materials with which it was built.

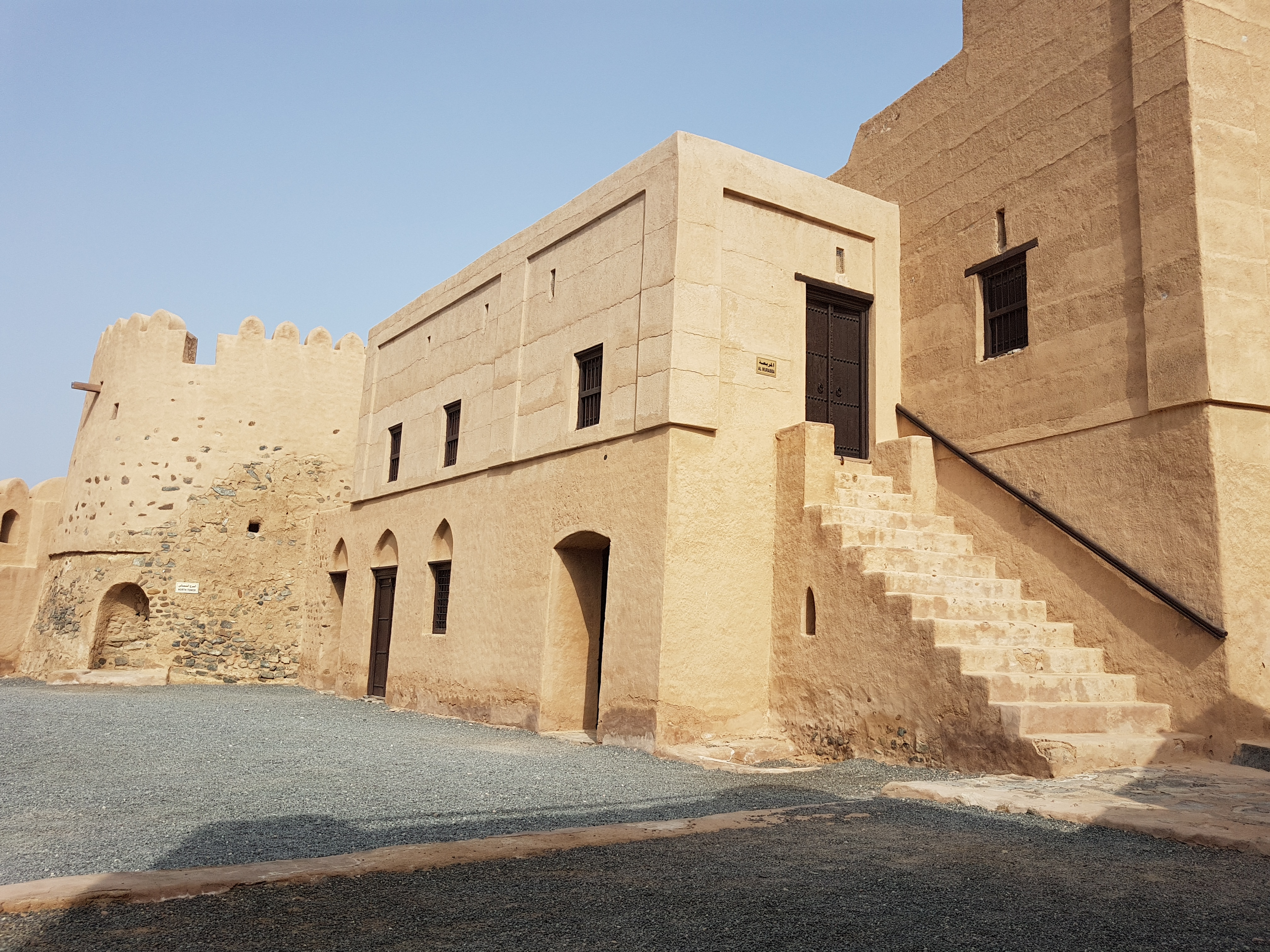
Inside the main courtyard

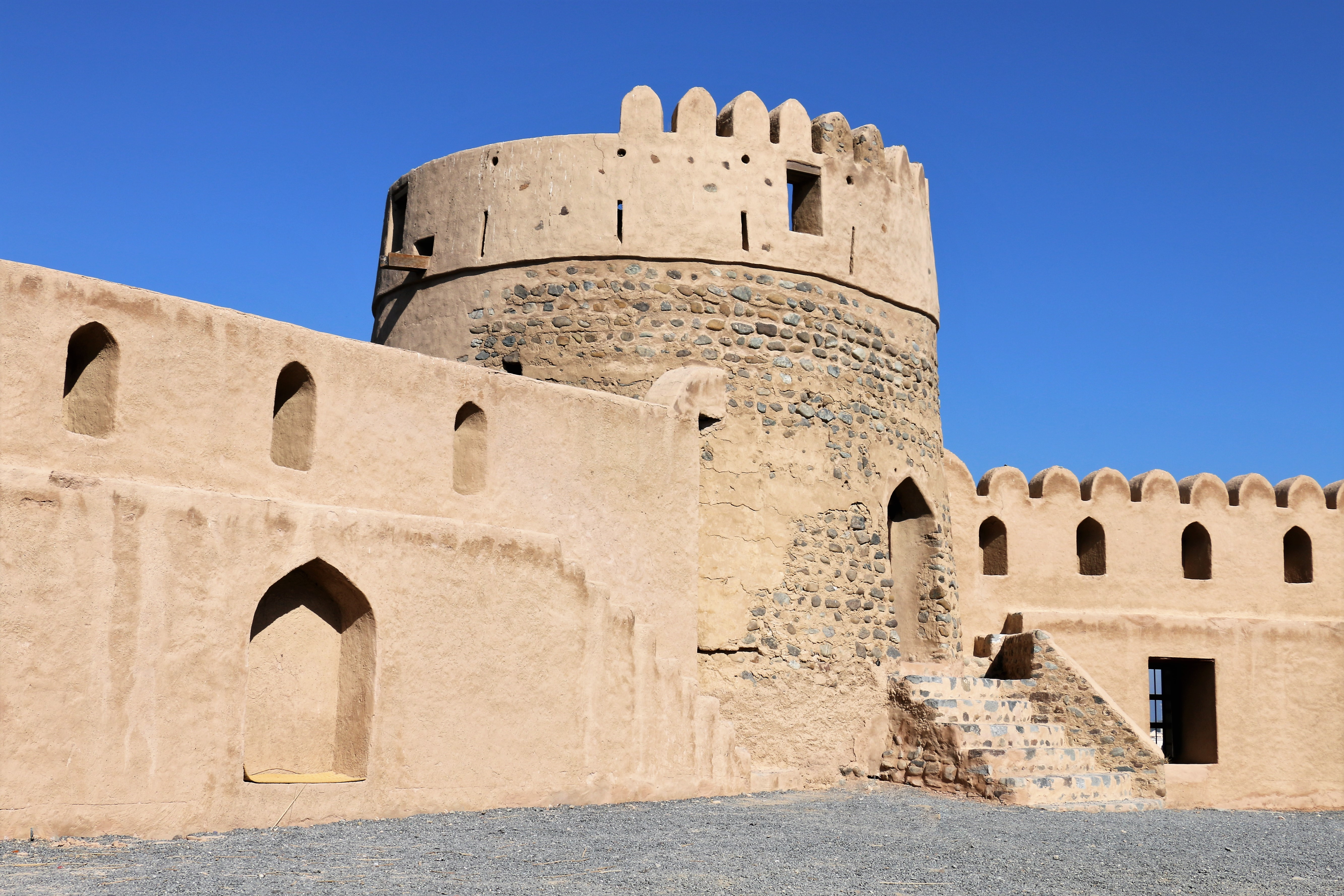
One of the watchtowers from the courtyard

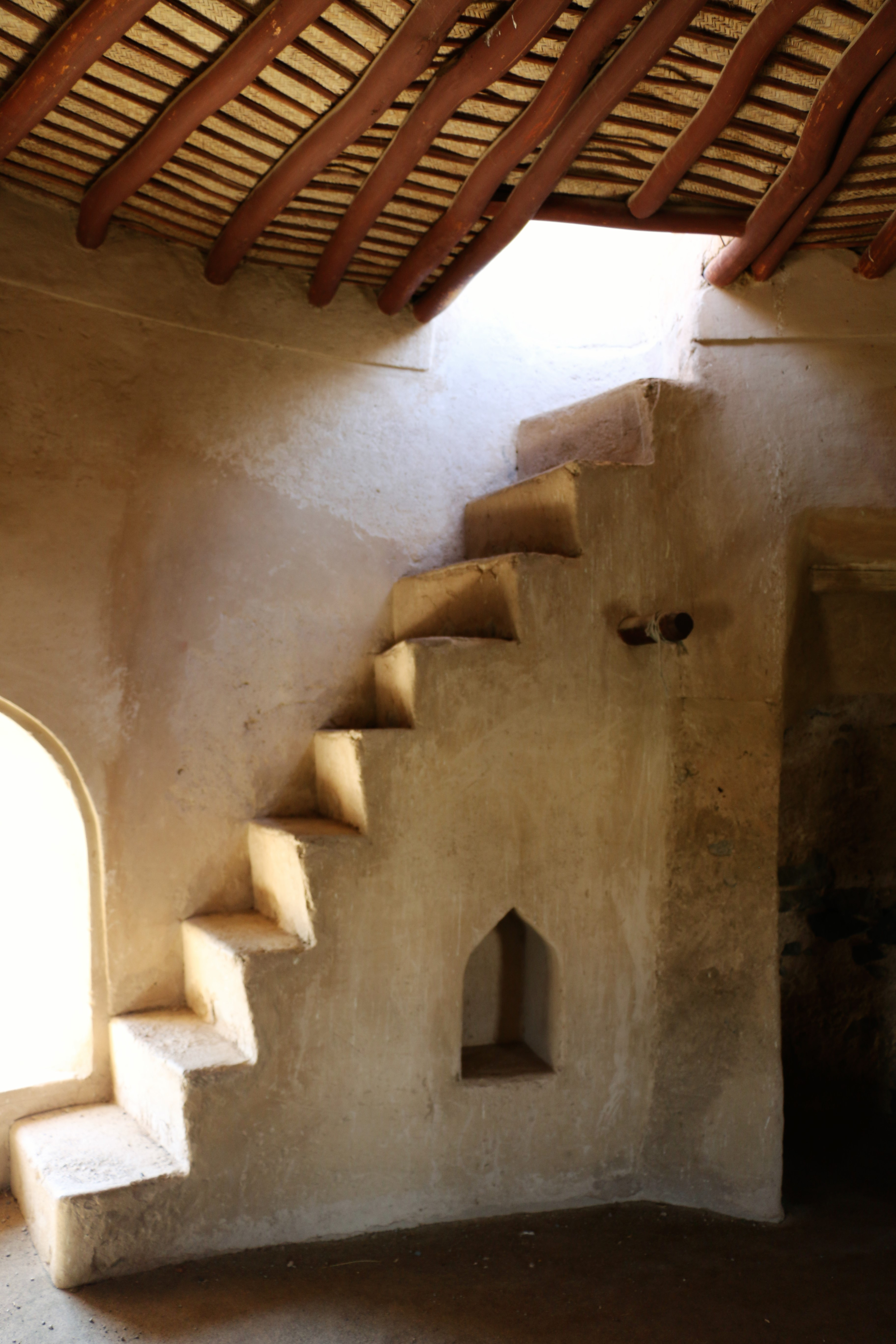
Staircase to the roof in one of the watchtowers

== See also ==
- Fujairah Museum, nearby
- Sakamkam Fort, to the north
