= Fujairah Corniche =

UAE seafront corniche

Coordinates: 25.121281°N 56.358022°E

The Fujairah Corniche is a seafront corniche located at the east end of Hamad Bin Abdulla Road in Fujairah City, Emirate of Fujairah, United Arab Emirates, providing recreational facilities for residents and visitors. It is on the coast of the Gulf of Oman in the Indian Ocean.

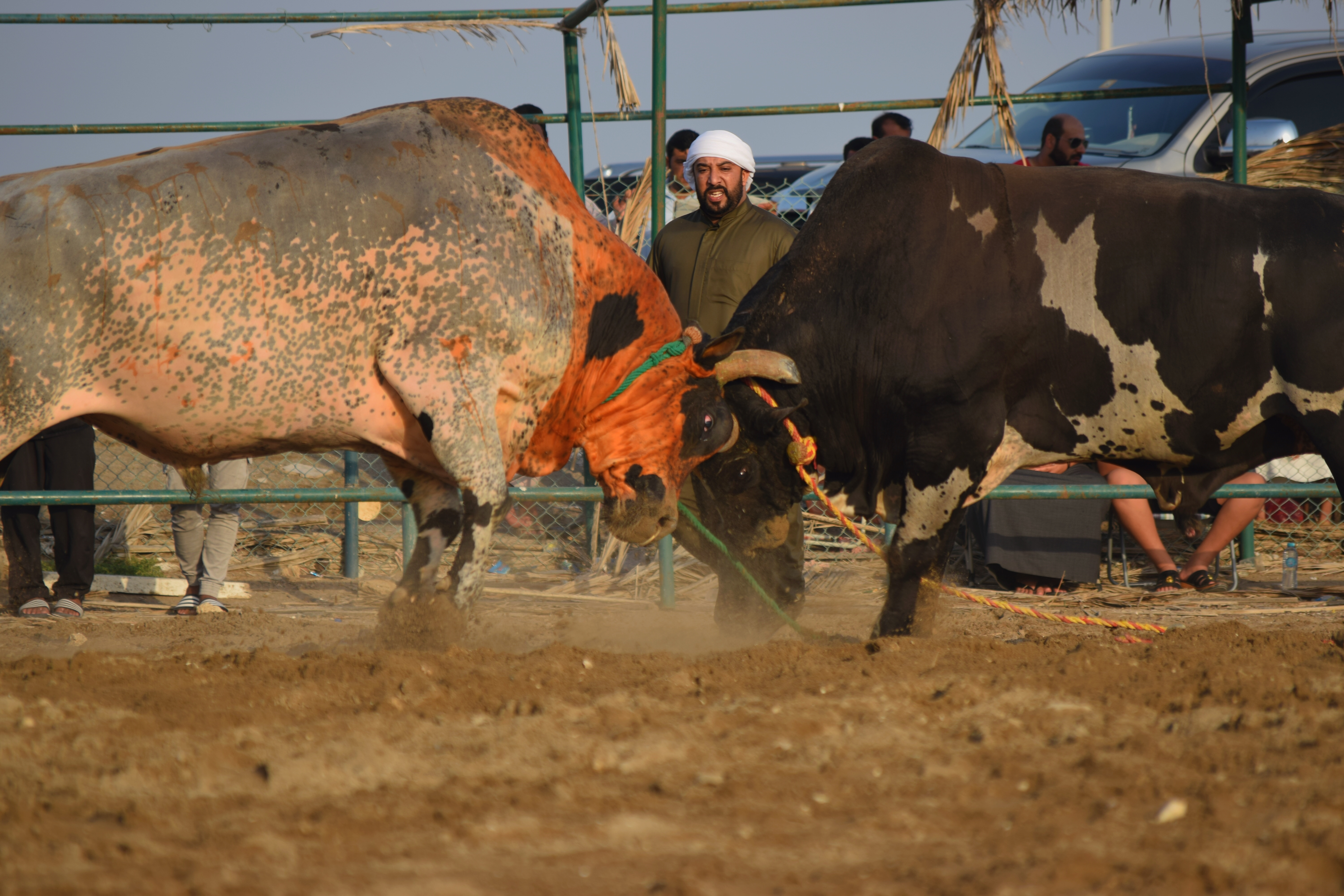
Bull wrestling at Fujairah Corniche

Al Corniche Road runs along the main corniche seafront. Al Faseel Road continues north behind Fujairah Beach. The Fujairah International Marine Club with a marina is located here. To the south there is a bull wrestling site.
