= Fujairah Beach =

Beach in Fujairah City, United Arab Emirates

Coordinates: 25.141930°N 56.356536°E

Fujairah Beach is on the Gulf of Oman, located on the northern part of Fujairah City, Emirate of Fujairah, United Arab Emirates.

At the southern end is the Hilton Fujairah hotel and beyond that the Fujairah International Marine Club with a marina. Just inland running along the length of Fujairah Beach is Al Faseel Road. To the west is the Fujairah City suburb of Al Faseel. Al Sharq Hospital is also close by in Al Faseel, located on the other side of Al Faseel Road.
