= Fujairah Free Zone =

UAE special economic zone

Coordinates: 25.171538°N 56.345682°E

Fujairah Free Zone (FFZ)
- Headquarters: Fujairah City, United Arab Emirates
- Area served: Fujairah
- Products: Free economic zone
- Website: https://freezone.fujairah.ae/

Fujairah Free Zone (FFZ) is a special economic zone in Fujairah, which is one of the seven emirates that comprise the United Arab Emirates. Fujairah Free Zone is located just north of the emirate's capital, Fujairah City. It is run by the Fujairah Free Zone Authority (FFZA).

== Overview ==
The free zone provides a tax-free environment for companies in Fujairah.

Close by are the Fujairah Oil Industry Zone and the Port of Fujairah on the coast providing access to the Gulf of Oman and the Indian Ocean. There are cargo air links via Fujairah International Airport to the south of Fujairah City. The area is also known as Sakamkam and nearby is the historic Sakamkam Fort. Additionally, the area's rich cultural heritage, epitomized by landmarks like Sakamkam Fort, adds a historical dimension to its modern commercial prowess, offering a unique blend of the past and present.

Creative City is another free zone in Fujairah.

== See also ==
- Creative City
- Port of Fujairah
- Fujairah International Airport
