= University of Fujairah =

University in Fujairah City, United Arab Emirates

Coordinates: 25.121875°N 56.335361°E

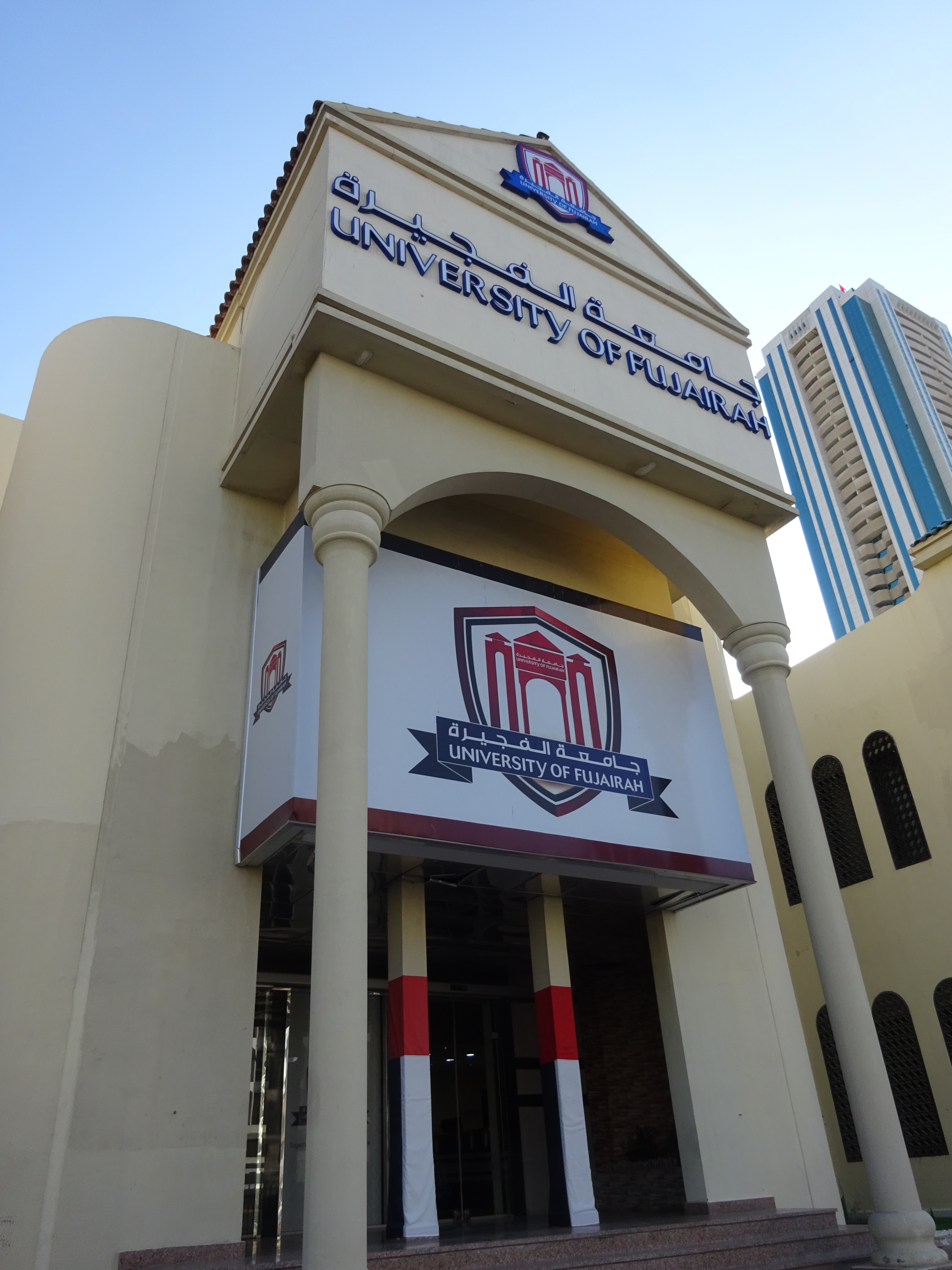
Main entrance of the University of Fujairah

The University of Fujairah (UOF) is a higher education institution in Fujairah City, capital city of Fujairah, United Arab Emirates. It was originally founded as Fujairah College in 2006.

The foundation of the college was initiated by the members of the Fujairah Welfare Association (FWA).

UOF is located on Hamad Bin Abdulla Road in central Fujairah City.
