= Fujairah Museum =

Archaeological and historical museum in Fujairah City, United Arab Emirates

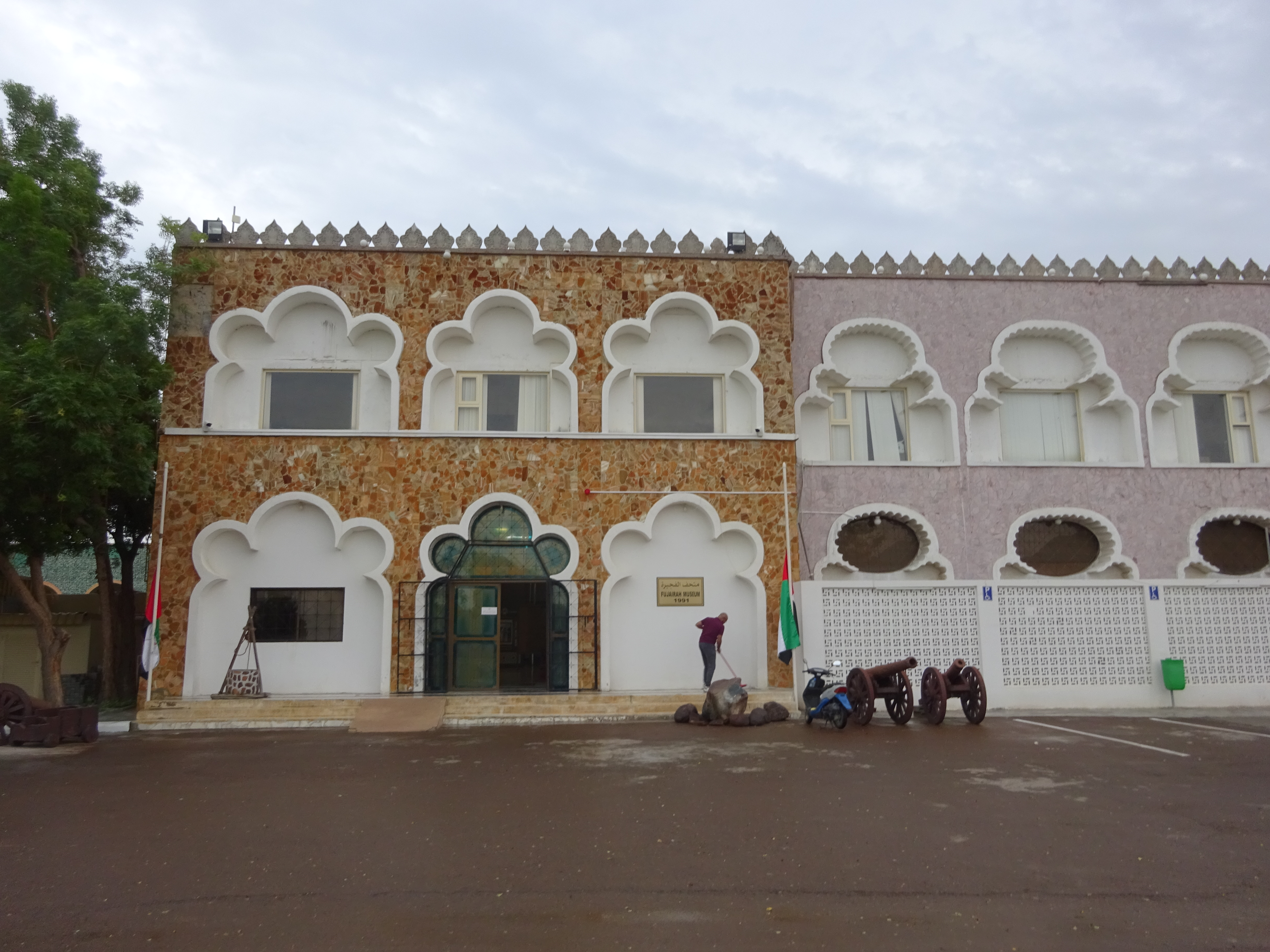
- Entrance to the museum
- Established: 30 November 1991
- Location: Fujairah City, Emirate of Fujairah, United Arab Emirates
- Coordinates: 25.133923°N 56.339709°E
- Type: Archaeology, local history

Fujairah Museum is an archaeology and local history museum located in Fujairah City, Emirate of Fujairah, United Arab Emirates.

== History ==
In 1969, a small single-room museum was established with exhibits including coins, farming tools, pottery, and weapons. On 27 May 1991, Sheikh Hamad bin Mohammed Al Sharqi issued a decree to establish a Department of Antiquities and Heritage for the Emirate of Fujairah, including maintenance of the museum and its collection. On 30 November 1991, the ruler of Fujairah officially opened the museum. In 1998, the Department completed museum expansion plans with two large halls covering antiquities and three halls for heritage.

== Overview ==
The museum has permanent exhibits of local archaeological finds and on the traditional way of life historically in Fujairah in particular and the UAE in general. Within the museum, the first exhibit hall displays heritage objects related to traditional local occupations such as agriculture, fishing, pottery, trade, and weaving. A second hall on heritage displays ancient weapons, various costumes, and utensils. A further hall has displays including a spice shop and souq. The displays include archaeological finds from tombs at Al Badiyah, Dibba Al-Fujairah, and Qidfa', with objects such as arrowheads, carnelian beads, and vessels. The museum has 2,100 artifacts and rare antiquities.

The museum is close to Fujairah Fort, which is within walking distance.

== Gallery ==
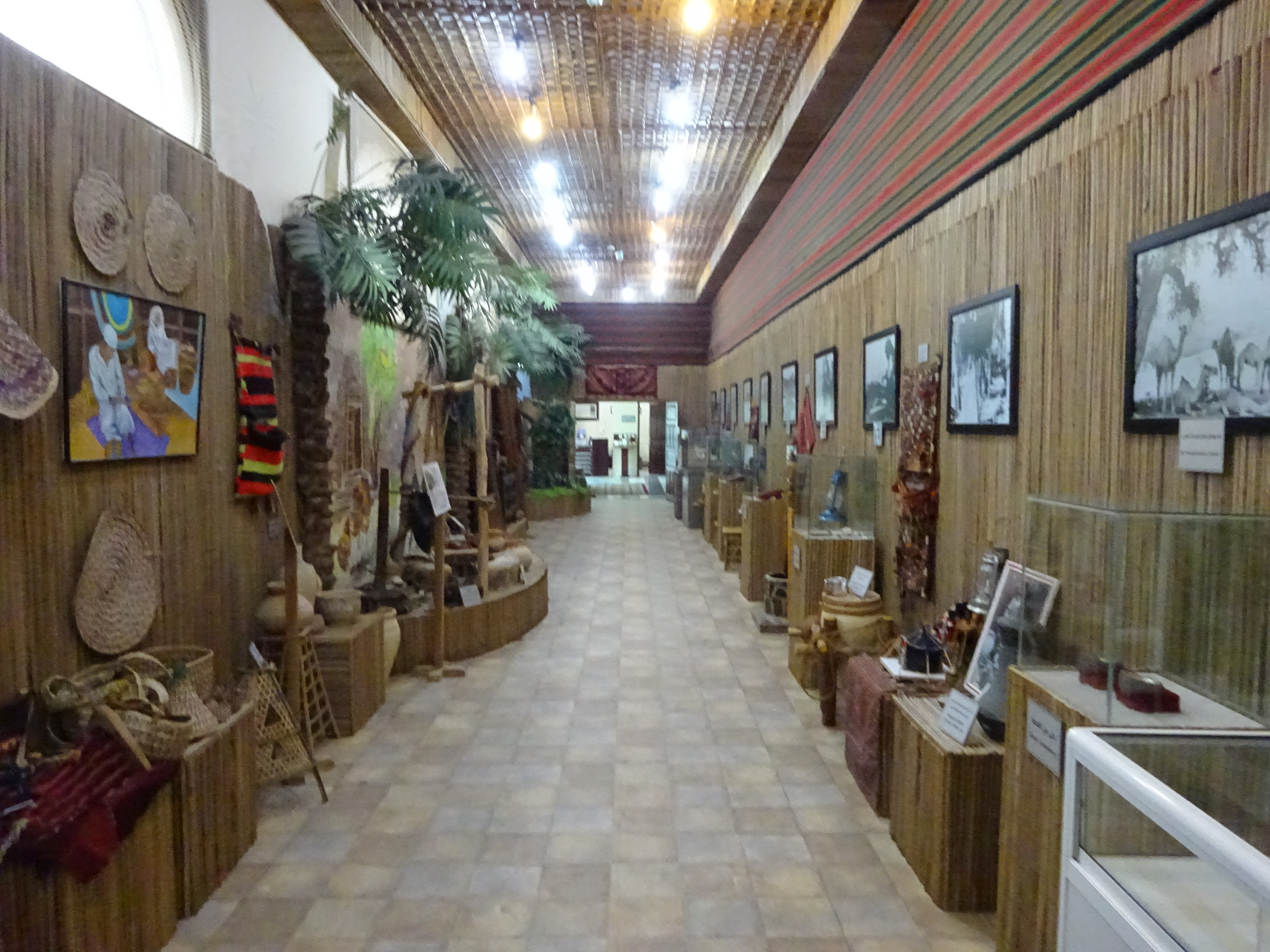

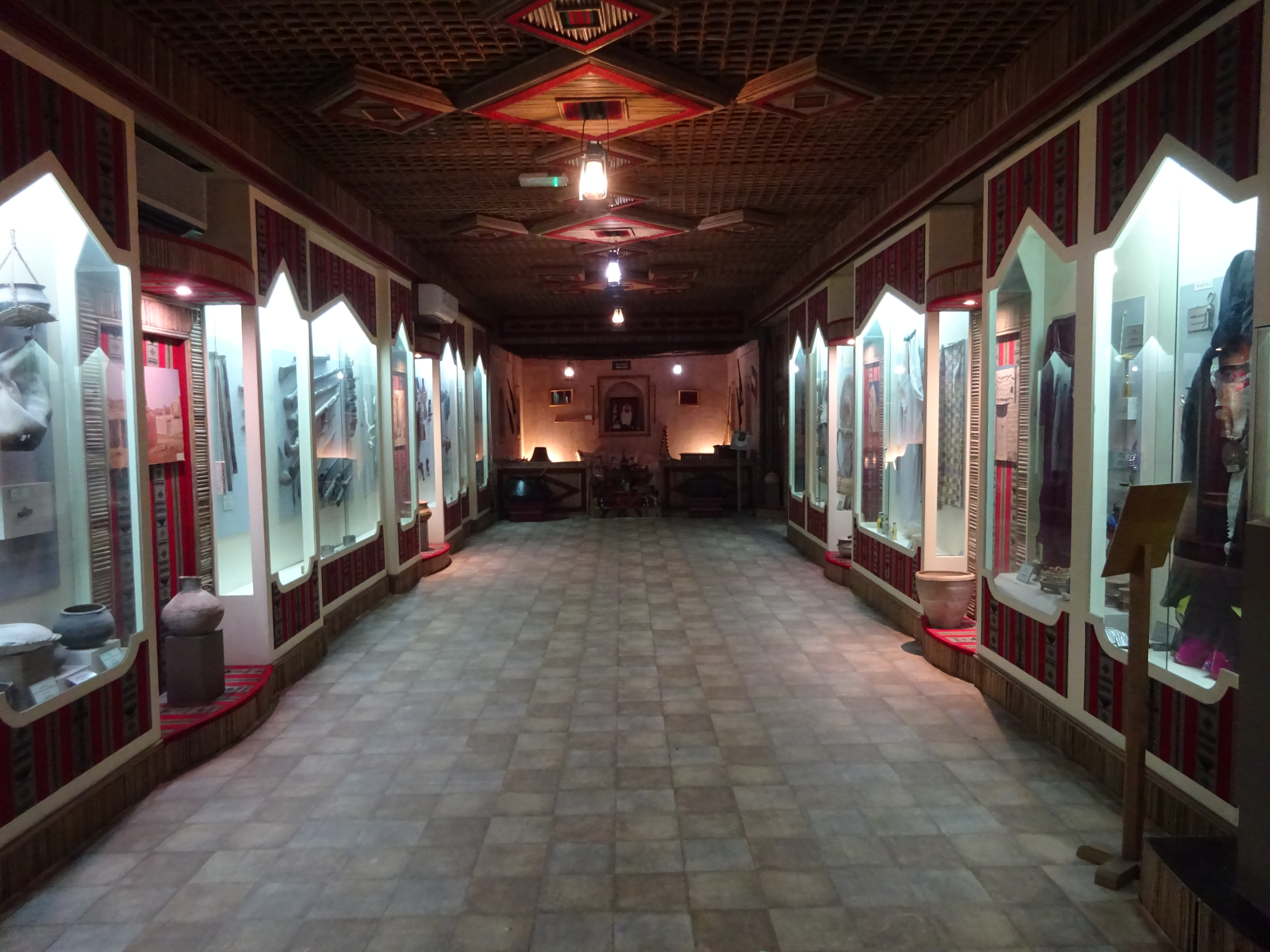

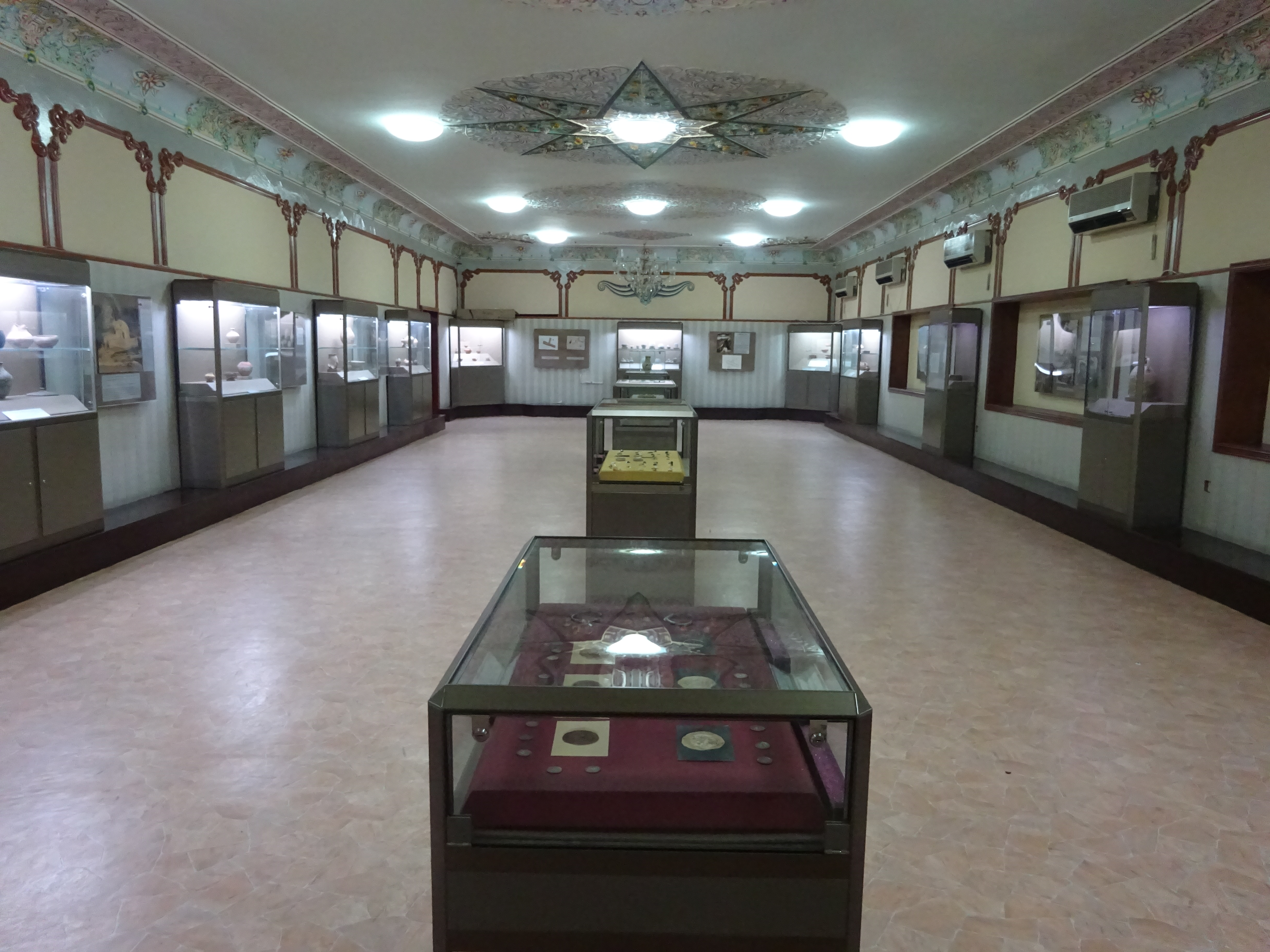

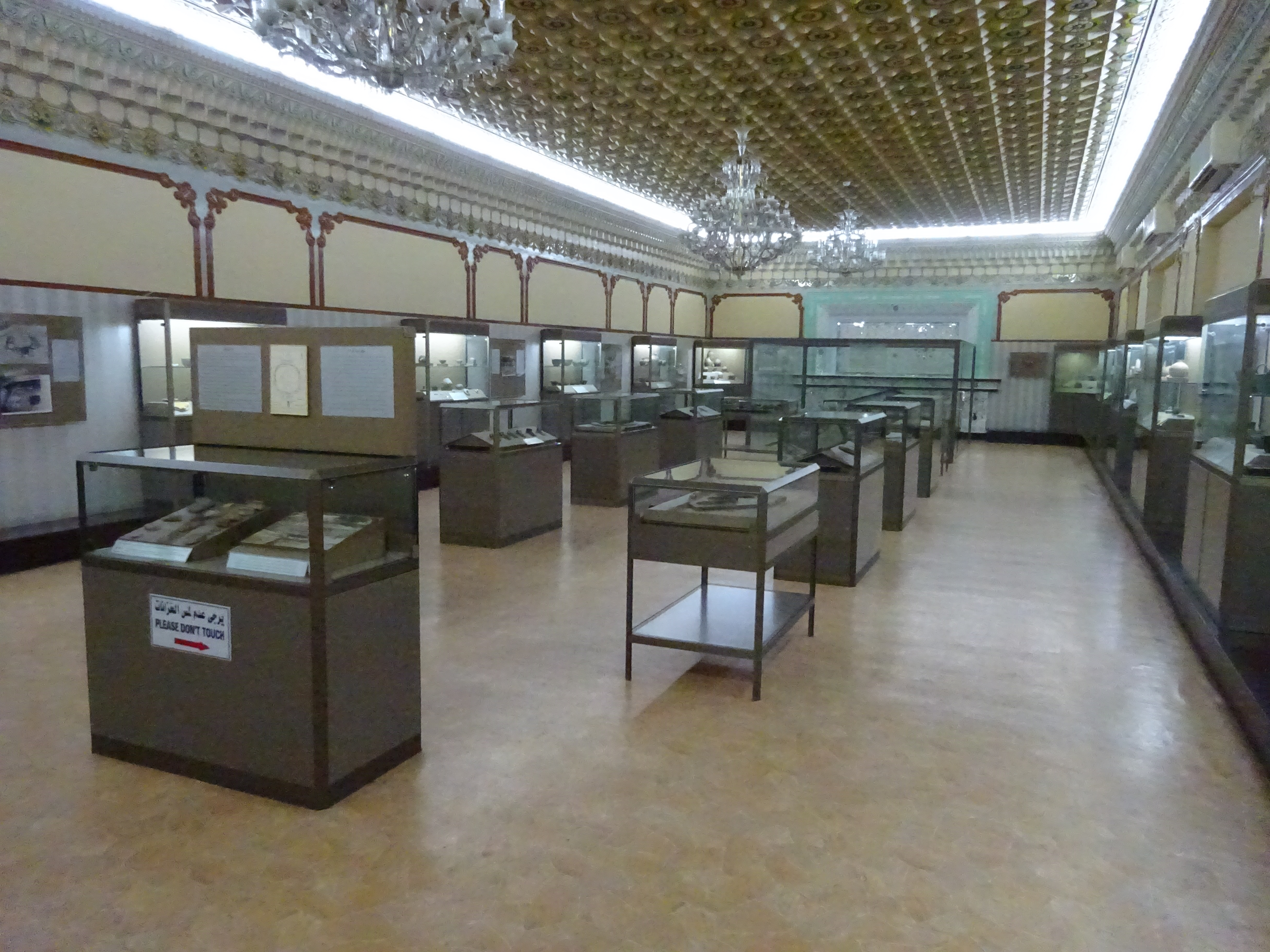

== See also ==
- Fujairah Fort
