= WAP =

WAP or Wap may refer to:

== Music ==
- "WAP" (song), a 2020 song by Cardi B featuring Megan Thee Stallion

== Organizations ==
- Weatherization Assistance Program, for US energy costs
- Western Australia Party, a political party founded in 2016
- Western Australian Party, a short-lived political party in 1906
- Women Against Pornography, an American radical feminist activist group
- World Animal Protection, an international charity
- Wale Adenuga Production, media company in Nigeria
- WapTV, now Miniweb, interactive television technology platform company

== Science and technology ==
- Weak anthropic principle, in astrophysics and cosmology
- Wireless access point, a device that allows wireless devices to connect to a wired network and to each other
- Wireless Application Protocol, a technical standard for accessing information over a mobile wireless network
- Wide AC electric passenger, a classification of Indian locomotives

== Other uses ==
- W-Arly-Pendjari Complex (WAP Complex), a transboundary Natural UNESCO World Heritage Site in Benin, Burkina Faso and Niger
- Western Antarctic Peninsula, a region of the Antarctic Peninsula
- Windsor Assembly Plant, a car factory in Canada
- Onomatopoetic sound effect sometimes used for striking, or else in reference to intercourse, often in repetition
