= Fujairah =

Capital of the Emirate of Fujairah, United Arab Emirates

Fujairah الفجيرة
- City
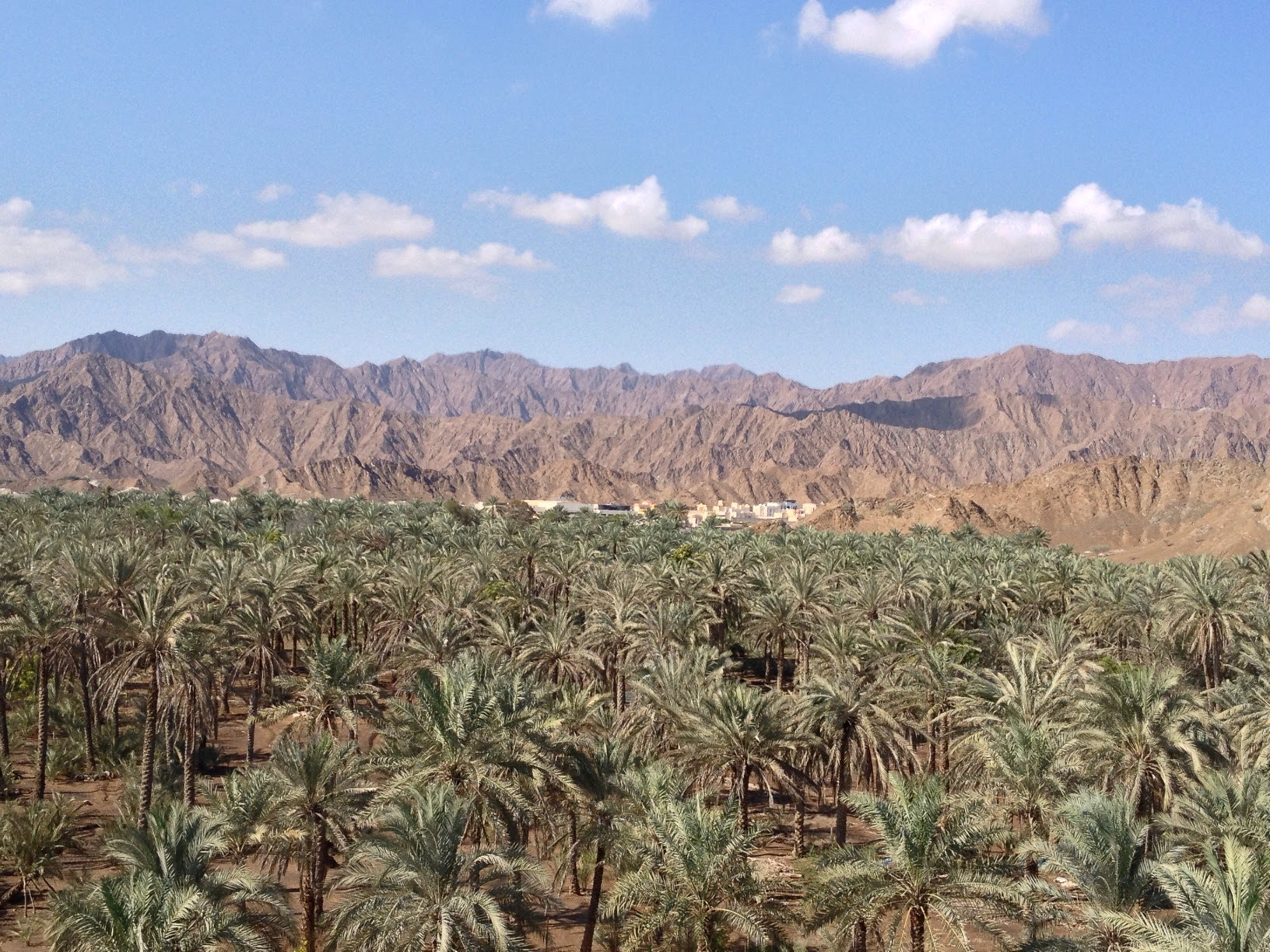
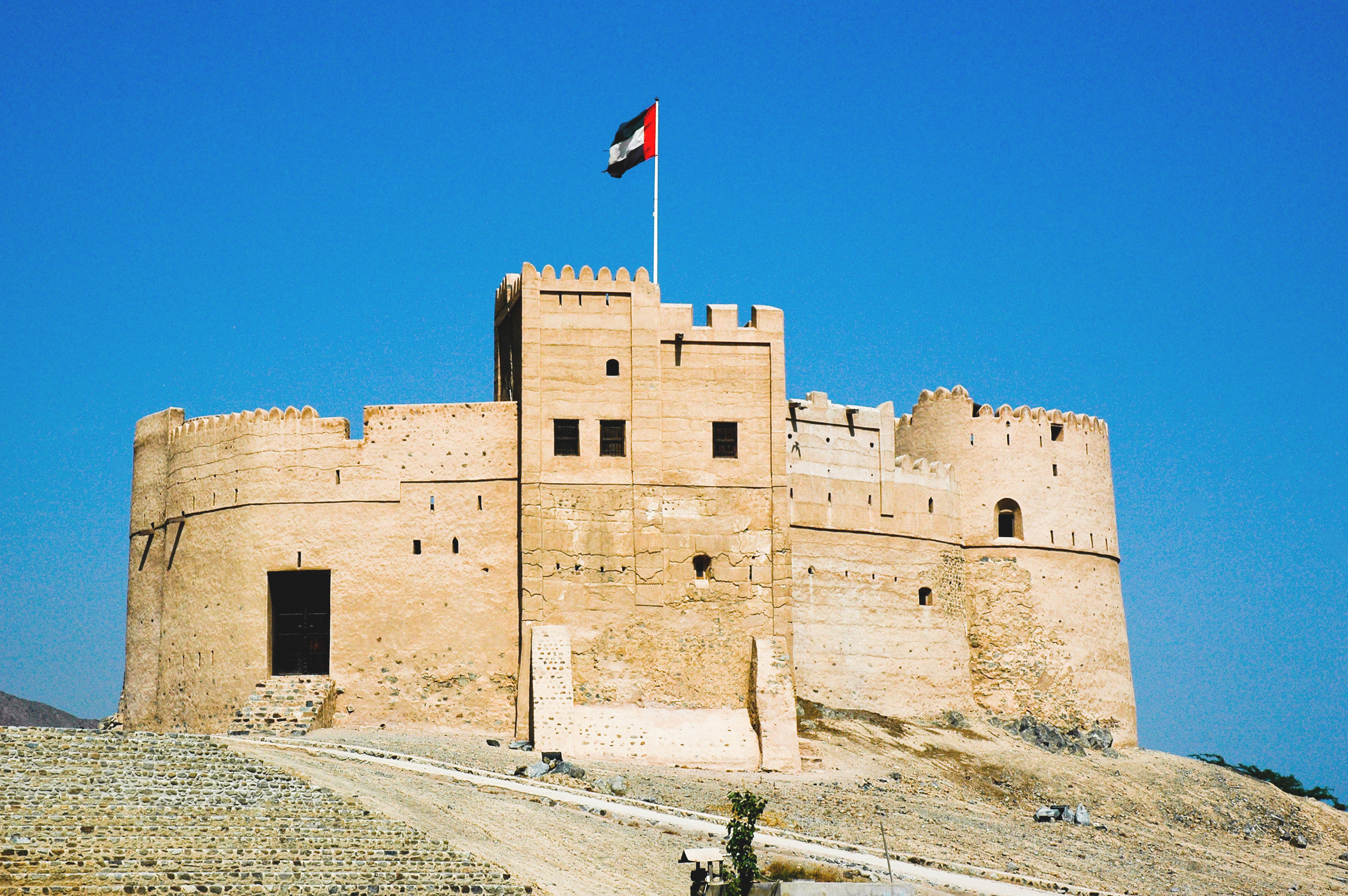
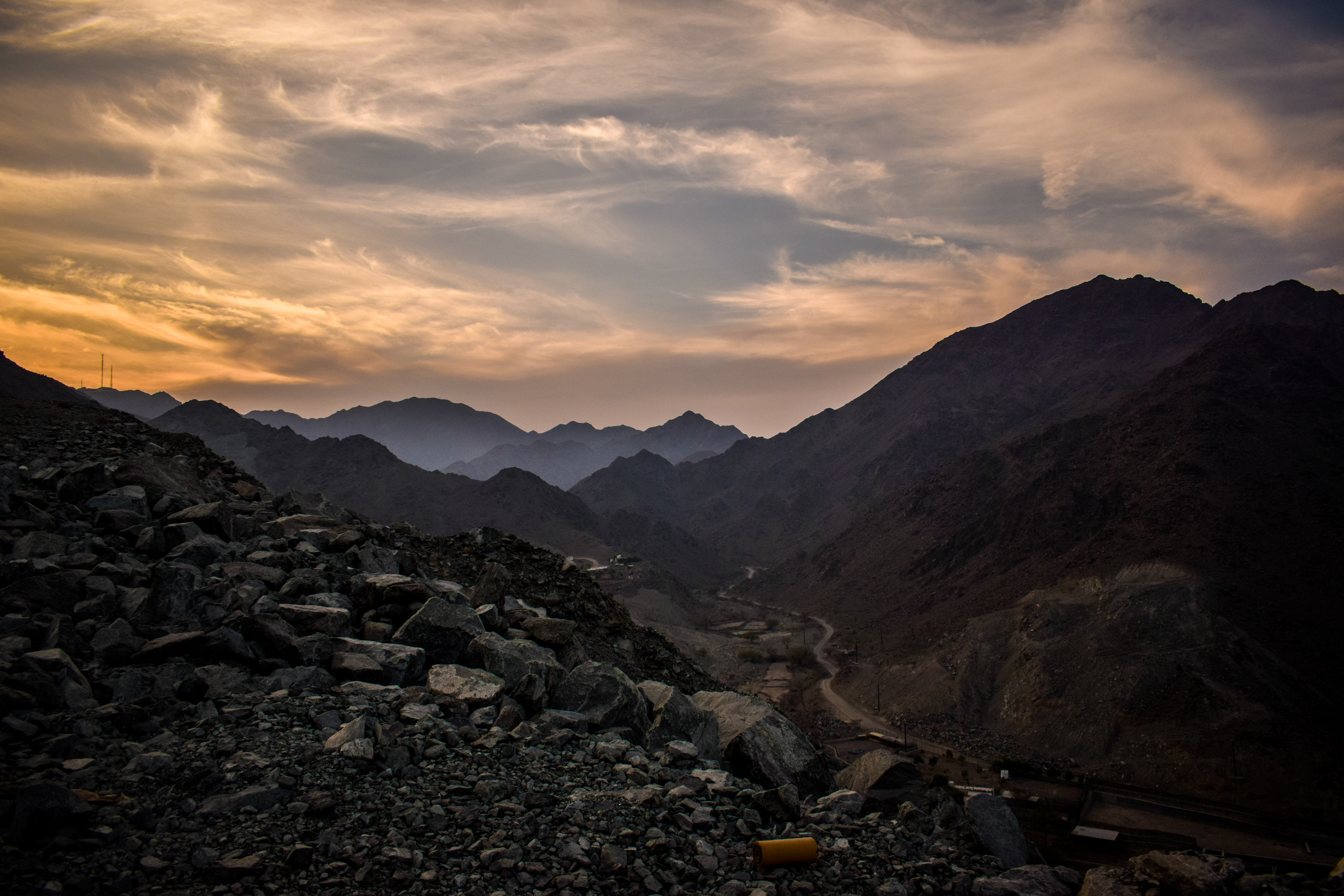
- Clockwise from top: Skyline of Fujairah, Date palms in Fujairah, Al Hajar Mountains, Sheikh Zayed Mosque - Fujairah, Fujairah Fort

- Seal

- Location of Fujairah City in the UAE Fujairah (Persian Gulf)
- Coordinates: 25°07′20″N 56°20′04″E
- Country: United Arab Emirates
- Emirate: Fujairah

Government
  - Type: Monarchy
  - Emir: (Sheikh Hamad bin Mohammed Al Sharqi)

Area
  - Total: 46 km^{2} (18 sq mi)

Population
  - Total: 118,933
  - Density: 2,600/km^{2} (6,700/sq mi)

GDP
  - Metro: US$ 6.8 billion (2023)
  - Per capita: US$ 23,500 (2023)
- Website: www.fujairahtourism.ae

Fujairah City (Arabic: الفجيرة) is the capital of the Emirate of Fujairah in the United Arab Emirates. It is the seventh-largest city in UAE, located on the Gulf of Oman (part of the Indian Ocean). It is the only Emirati capital city on the UAE's east coast. The city of Fujairah is an industrial and commercial hub located on the west coast of the Indian Ocean that sits at the foothills of the Hajar Mountains.

== Demographics ==
In 2016, the city had a population of 97,226, a significant share (43%) of the emirate's total population of 225,360. In 2023, the population grew to 118,933. Fujairah's population has grown steadily over the past few decades, driven by economic development, urbanization, and an increasing number of expatriates settling in the emirate. In 2023 the native Emirati population in Fujairah has been 34,2% of the total population.

== Climate ==
The climate of Fujairah is characterized by a hot desert climate (Köppen climate classification BWh), with very warm winters and extremely hot summers. In the summer months, daytime temperatures typically reach highs of around 41 °C (106 °F), while winter temperatures are milder, averaging around 25 °C (77 °F) . Humidity can be quite high, especially during the summer, making the heat feel even more intense. The region experiences minimal rainfall, with most precipitation occurring between December and March. Fujairah receives an average annual rainfall of about 120 mm (4.7 inches).

=== 2022 Floods in Fujairah ===
In 2022, Fujairah experienced significant flooding due to heavy rains that occurred in July. This led to widespread damage in the emirate, affecting businesses and residents alike. The floods were part of a larger weather event that brought the highest recorded rainfall in nearly three decades. The damage was substantial, with traders in Fujairah reporting major losses. The floods resulted in rescue operations for hundreds of people and the establishment of temporary shelters for those displaced by the flooding.

Climate data for Fujairah International Airport (1991–2020)
| Month | Jan | Feb | Mar | Apr | May | Jun | Jul | Aug | Sep | Oct | Nov | Dec | Year |
|---|---|---|---|---|---|---|---|---|---|---|---|---|---|
| Record high °C (°F) | 35.3 (95.5) | 35.6 (96.1) | 41.7 (107.1) | 44.1 (111.4) | 50.2 (122.4) | 49.5 (121.1) | 49.0 (120.2) | 48.3 (118.9) | 45.0 (113.0) | 41.5 (106.7) | 38.7 (101.7) | 32.8 (91.0) | 50.2 (122.4) |
| Mean daily maximum °C (°F) | 24.8 (76.6) | 25.9 (78.6) | 28.6 (83.5) | 33.9 (93.0) | 38.6 (101.5) | 39.3 (102.7) | 37.6 (99.7) | 36.5 (97.7) | 35.9 (96.6) | 34.2 (93.6) | 30.2 (86.4) | 26.7 (80.1) | 32.7 (90.9) |
| Daily mean °C (°F) | 20.8 (69.4) | 21.9 (71.4) | 24.3 (75.7) | 29.1 (84.4) | 33.6 (92.5) | 34.9 (94.8) | 34.1 (93.4) | 33.0 (91.4) | 32.1 (89.8) | 30.2 (86.4) | 26.2 (79.2) | 22.7 (72.9) | 28.6 (83.5) |
| Mean daily minimum °C (°F) | 17.1 (62.8) | 18.1 (64.6) | 20.5 (68.9) | 24.8 (76.6) | 29.3 (84.7) | 31.4 (88.5) | 31.6 (88.9) | 30.7 (87.3) | 29.2 (84.6) | 26.5 (79.7) | 22.5 (72.5) | 18.9 (66.0) | 25.0 (77.0) |
| Record low °C (°F) | 10.8 (51.4) | 11.0 (51.8) | 14.8 (58.6) | 17.2 (63.0) | 20.5 (68.9) | 26.4 (79.5) | 26.7 (80.1) | 26.0 (78.8) | 24.4 (75.9) | 18.5 (65.3) | 16.8 (62.2) | 10.5 (50.9) | 10.5 (50.9) |
| Average precipitation mm (inches) | 20.5 (0.81) | 10.3 (0.41) | 24.8 (0.98) | 7.6 (0.30) | 1.9 (0.07) | 0.0 (0.0) | 1.5 (0.06) | 0.2 (0.01) | 0.1 (0.00) | 5.8 (0.23) | 9.4 (0.37) | 25.0 (0.98) | 107.2 (4.22) |
| Average precipitation days (≥ 1 mm) | 2.6 | 2.4 | 2.9 | 1.7 | 1.6 | 0.0 | 1.5 | 1.0 | 1.0 | 1.7 | 1.8 | 2.5 | 21.0 |
| Average relative humidity (%) | 63 | 64 | 61 | 51 | 47 | 57 | 67 | 73 | 69 | 59 | 60 | 63 | 61.1 |
Source: NOAA (humidity 1981-2010)

== Commercial ==
Fujairah City is the main business and commercial centre for the emirate, with tall office buildings lining Hamad Bin Abdulla Road, the main route into the city. The road runs through the city and connects Fujairah City to Dubai through the Emirate of Sharjah. The city's location provides direct access to the Indian Ocean for the United Arab Emirates, avoiding use of the Persian Gulf, which requires access via the Strait of Hormuz. The northern part of the waterfront has many cylindrical tanks for oil storage.

The Fujairah Free Zone is a special economic zone located to the north of the city and subject to different economic regulations. Creative City is a media free zone on the Sheikh Khalifa Highway to the west. It was established in 2007 as a media hub that offers benefits to media companies and entrepreneurial projects in the media, music, entertainment, events, communication, and marketing sectors.

The Port of Fujairah is located on the city's eastern coast, just outside the Strait of Hormuz, and was built in 1978. It began operations in 1983 and today has a quay that stretches over 6.7 km.

It is located on a major global shipping route and is one of the world's largest bunkering hubs alongside Singapore and Rotterdam. The port is an oil hub and has launched plans to expand its oil storage capacity by 75% by 2022.

The Fujairah Oil Industry Zone (FOIZ) is located north of the Port of Fujairah and has a storage capacity of 10 million cubic meters for refined oil products. It was established to develop and regulate the hydrocarbon industry in the emirate of Fujairah and to support growth and investment in the sector. Eighteen companies operate in the FOIZ, and the Aramco Trading Company opened its second overseas office in the Fujairah Oil Industry Zone in 2019, the first one being in Singapore.

There are a number of shopping malls, including the large City Centre Fujairah mall, opened in 2012. Other malls include Fujairah Mall (opened in 2016), LuLu Mall (opened in 2014), and Century Mall. Markets include Central Market, Fabric Souk, and Fish & Vegetable Market.

== Education ==
The University of Fujairah is located in Fujairah City. The city of Fujairah is also home to several other universities.

Some schools in the city are Diyar Private Academy, Our Own English High School,Eminence private school,Indian School Fujairah, and St Mary's Catholic High School.

== Tourism ==
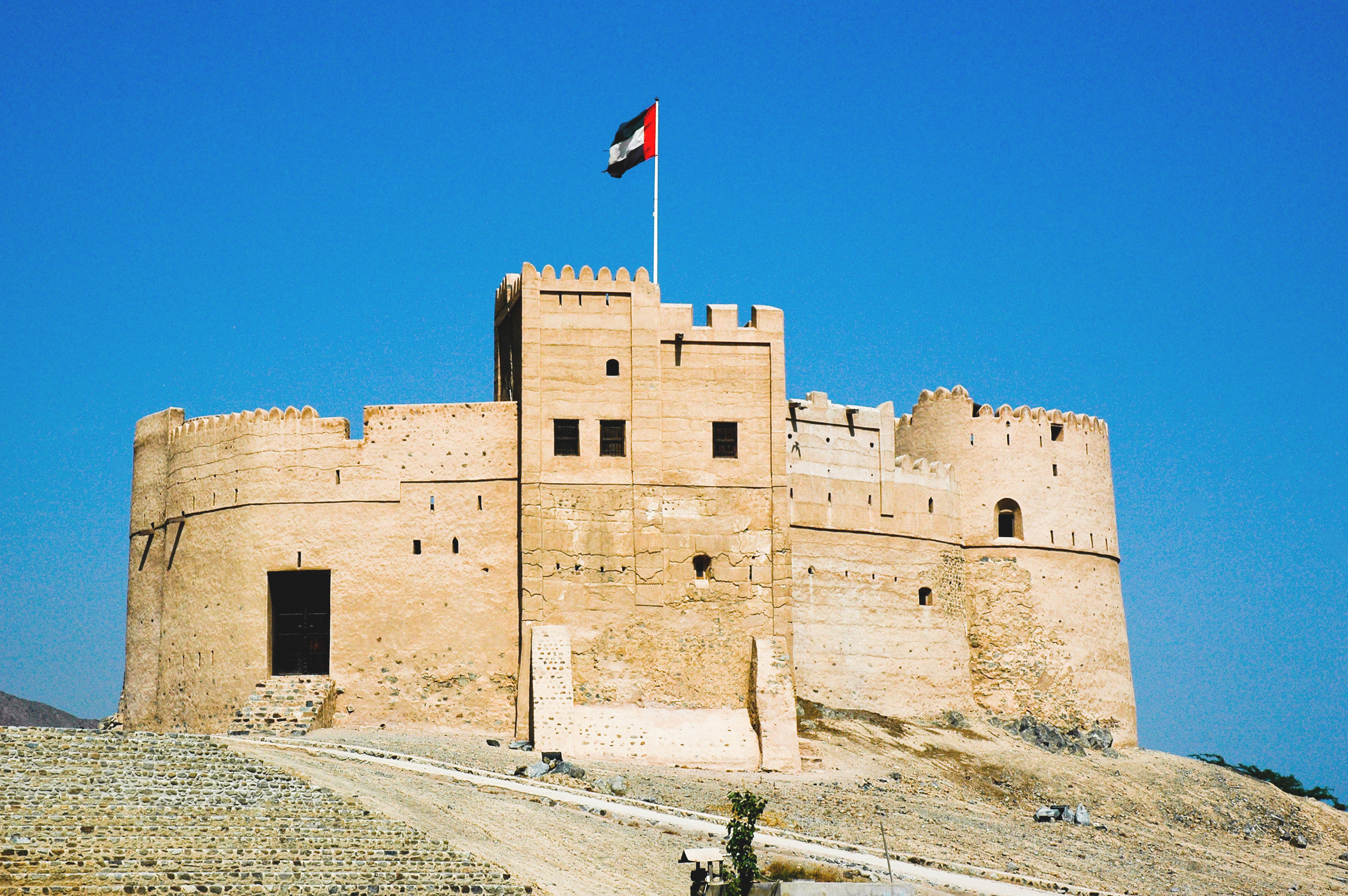
Fujairah Fort

The restored Fujairah Fort and the nearby Fujairah Museum are located in Fujairah City. Fujairah Heritage Village, near Madhab Spring Park, preserves some of the emirate's past. The main mosque is the large white Sheikh Zayed Mosque, the second largest in the UAE and a landmark that is visible from many locations in the centre of the city. It can hold around 28,000 worshippers.

The Fujairah Museum opened its doors in 1991 and is home to archeological exhibits discovered in various parts of the emirate. Some of the exhibits date back to the sixth millennium BC, while others are from the city's more modern Islamic rule. They include pottery, jewellery, and spearheads. The most famous item at the museum is an ostrich egg that dates back to 2,500 BC.

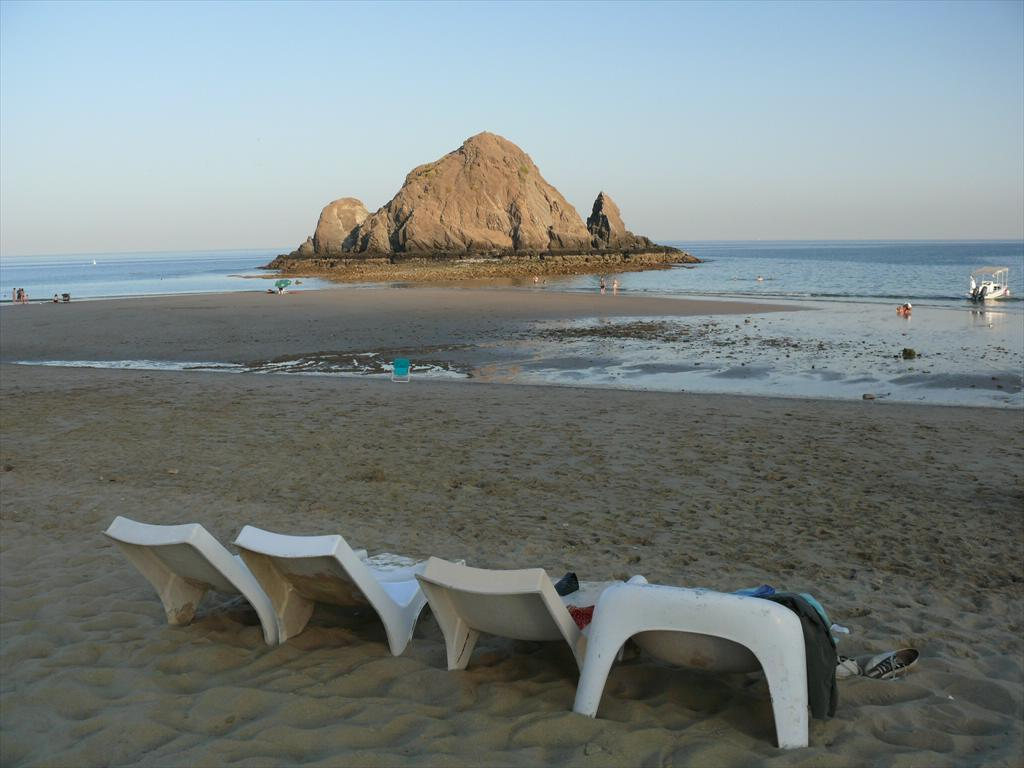
View on Fujairah Beach looking out to sea

On the seafront are Fujairah Corniche and Fujairah International Marine Club on Al Corniche Road. There is also bullfighting on Friday afternoons. To the north is Fujairah Beach on Al Faseel Road.

The bullfighting held in Fujairah City is a significant public event. It does not include matadors like the Spanish form of bullfighting and does not kill the animals. It consists of two bulls locking horns, which can result in injuries. Families and betting to attend the events are not allowed.

Most major hotels are on or close to Hamad Bin Abdulla Road and Al Corniche Road.

== Transportation ==
The Sheikh Khalifa Bin Zayed Expressway (aka Sheikh Khalifa Highway), a dual carriageway road, links Fujairah City with Dubai and other parts of the UAE, passing through the mountains just inland from the city. This leads into Hamad Bin Abdulla Road, which continues through the city to the coast.

The main airport in the emirate, Fujairah International Airport, is located to the south of Fujairah City. It currently mostly handles cargo traffic. Pakistan International Airlines became one of the first passenger flights to fly into Fujairah Airport on 25 November 2021. PIA now operates two weekly flights originating from Peshawar and Islamabad in Pakistan.

Additionally, Egyptair operates flights to Cairo, and SalamAir offers regular flights to Muscat and onwards to destinations in India and South East Asia, with seasonal flights to Salalah.

The UAE's national railway, Etihad Rail, began passenger services connecting Fujairah with other emirates on 30 June 2026. The inaugural service departed from Fujairah Station for Mohammed Bin Zayed City in Abu Dhabi, a journey of approximately 1 hour 45 minutes. Passenger rail services are being expanded in phases, with the network planned to connect Fujairah with other emirates and major population centres across the UAE.

== Twin towns and sister cities ==
- Fujairah is twinned with:
- Ljubljana, Slovenia

== See also ==
- Fujairah F2 IWPP
- Madhab Palace
